= Mike Hawkins (musician) =

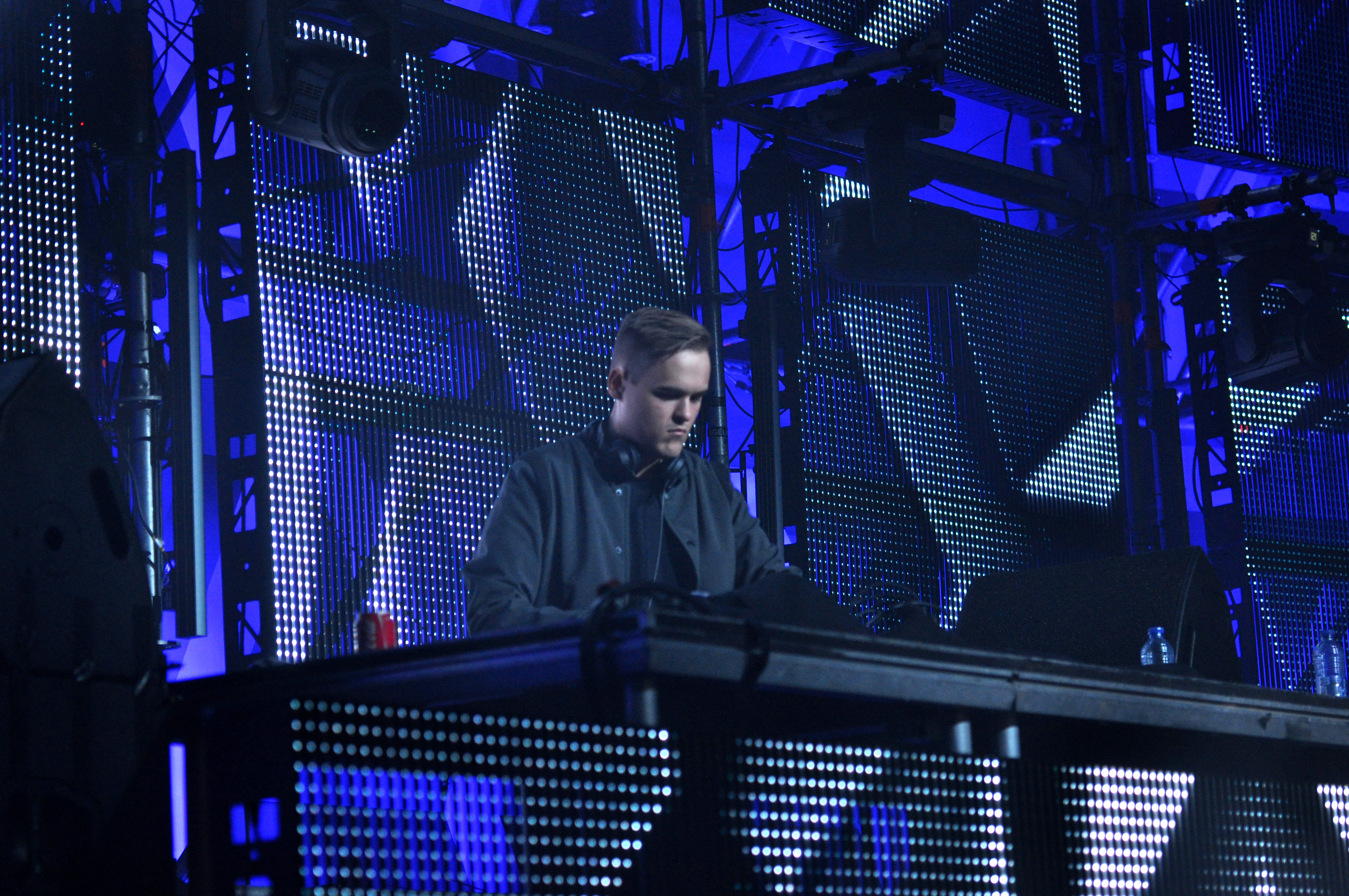
- Hawkins at Paaspop 2014

Background information
- Also known as: Eurohawk
- Born: Mikkel Kauczki Cox; May 22, 1991 (age 35); Aarhus, Central Jutland Region, Denmark
- Genres: Electro house; progressive house; big room house; dubstep
- Occupations: Musician; DJ; record producer
- Instruments: Logic Pro; piano; guitar; synthesizer
- Years active: 2006–present
- Labels: Vaypor; Megaton; Spinnin'; Ultra; Fly Eye; Armada; Sony Music; EMI; Positiva; Virgin
- Website: mikehawkins.nu

Mikkel Kauczki Cox (born May 22, 1991), known professionally as Mike Hawkins, is a Danish musician, DJ and record producer.

Hawkins has played with a number of other well-known DJs, including Trentemøller, Sébastien Léger, Ferry Corsten, Marcus Schössow, among others. He has gained support in his releases from Sander van Doorn (whose label, Doorn Records, he has also released on), Ferry Corsten, Faithless, Erick Morillo, Fedde Le Grand, Abel Ramos and others.

In 2010, Hawkins worked frequently with DJ Mag Top 100 DJs Marcus Schössow and Daniel Kandi. In 2011, he released tracks on the labels Virgin/EMI and Sony Music, among others.

== Early life ==
Mikkel Kauczki Cox was born on May 22, 1991 in Aarhus, Central Jutland Region, where he was raised during his childhood. His mother is a singer and vocal coach, and his father is a drummer. When he was 2, he began playing the drums. By the age of 4, his grandfather taught him how to cook. At the age of 7, he became interested in music when he received a cheap and aft sampler. He was interested in rock music and listened rock artists such as System of a Down, Linkin Park and Rammstein before he was exposed into trance music.

At the age of 13, he downloaded Sound Forge and started doing mashups of Eminem and System of a Down. A friend then gave him Fruity Loops and he started using it. At the age of 14, he thought about forming a rock band with his friends, although the idea faded within a year. After pursuing different studies, he returned to music. He started his career making techno music under the stage name "Eurohawk", but changed it to "Mike Hawkins" in 2008, under which he since then began making mainly house music.

He uses Logic Pro as his digital audio workstation. Previously, he used FL Studio.

== Career ==
=== 2008–11: Career beginnings and remixes ===
Initially starting his career making techno music as "Eurohawk", he changed his stage name to "Mike Hawkins" in 2008 when he began focusing more on house music. In 2009, he released his debut extended play titled "Dark Matter / Into Sound" through Spinnin' Records sub-label Tone Diary. That same year, he met Maarten Hoogstraten and Paul Bäumer of the Bingo Players. In 2010, he released the single "Get You Down" featuring Gregory Boyd through Danish record label Sound of Copenhagen, which appeared on the compilation album Sound of Copenhagen Volume 4. He was also named "Breakthrough Producer of the Year" by Marcus Schössow in the 2010 DJ Mag. On October 15, he had three tracks featured in BBC Radio 1's radio show Essential Mix, including the single "Cherry Coke" with Pablo Oliveros, which was set to be released in March 2011.

On March 7, 2011, Hawkins and Thomas Sagstad released a remix of "Drive", a single by Kenneth Thomas featuring Roberta Harrison and Steve Taetz. On September 13, 2011, the two had released a collaboration with Pablo Oliveros on Agape Music, titled "Just Be You" which featured Gregory Boyd. A remix pack for the song was released in that same month. A month later, he and Oliveros released a two-track extended play titled "Not Another Anthem / Cherrycoke" on Spinnin' Records sub-label Tone Diary. It was released to Beatport on October 17, and to iTunes on October 21. That same month, the two had released a remix of "I Want You (To Want Me Back)" by Morten Hampenberg and Alexander Brown featuring Stine Bramsen. Shortly afterwards, in November, he collaborated with Sagstad for the remix of "On Your Own" by Serge Devant featuring Coyle Girelli. For the final release of the year, he and Oliveros released the collaborative remix of "We Are the Night" by In the Screen featuring Rachael Starr that was a part of the remix album Subliminal Remixed - Vol. 2.

=== 2012–13: Megaton Records and Spinnin' Records ===
The remix of "Focus" by Ryan Mendoza, which was a part of the extended play Tone Academy, was his first release of 2012. It was followed by another collaboration with Pablo Oliveros for the remix of "Raise the Floor" by Hampenberg and Alexander Brown featuring Pitbull, Fatman Scoop and Nabiha. The two then had released singles on Spinnin' Records sub-label Oxygen Recordings, including "Common Ground" featuring Gregory Boyd and "Slump". In June, Hawkins released a remix of "On My Side" by Turboweekend. That same month, he founded his own record label Megaton Records. "Floripa" was released as the label's first track on July 2, 2012. He also released "Shut the Place Down" with Jay Colin, as well as "More Machines" as a free download. On October 18, 2012, he released his second single on the label titled "This Is How We Roll", which was yet another collaboration with Oliveros. "Expand" was the two's final track of the year and was released through Megaton Records.

On January 30, 2013, Hawkins released the single "Trigger Warning" on Megaton Records. It was followed by "SRSLY Cool", a collaborative track with Dem Slackers. He then collaborated with TooManyLeftHands and Alexander Brown for the single "EDM CPH". On July 15, 2013, he released "Jump!", a collaboration with Henry Fong and Pablo Oliveros on Hysteria Records. The song received support from a number of DJs including Bingo Players, Don Diablo, DVBBS, Inpetto and Zeds Dead, among others. Shortly afterwards, in August, he and Oliveros returned to Tone Diary for the single "Bangover", which was well received by DJs such as Afrojack, Arty and Dimitri Vegas & Like Mike. That same month, he released a remix of "Seven Nation Army" by The White Stripes as a free download, as well as a remix of "Touched By You" by Paul Oakenfold featuring JHart. Shortly afterwards, he made his debut on Ultra Music with the collaborative track with Sebjak, titled "Let's Go". On October 28, 2013, he released "Hot Steppa", a collaboration with Henry Fong and Toby Green on Spinnin' Records. Katie Smith of EDMTunes stated that the track "builds with intricate percussion and ska-style brass horns before delivering an absolutely thundering drop, capturing the very essence of what a great electro-house track should be". Shortly afterwards, he and Green released the collaborative single "We Got This" on Megaton Records. His final track of the year, "Ulysses", was a collaboration with Marcus Schössow and Pablo Oliveros and was released through Steve Angello's label Size Records.

=== 2014–15: "Soldiers", "Revolt", touring and collaborations ===
Hawkins started 2014 by releasing a remix of "Arena" by J3n5on featuring Walter & Daniels. Shortly afterwards, in February, he debuted on Sander van Doorn's label Doorn Records with the single "Soldiers". An official music video for the song was also released. Lee Maier of EDMTunes stated that the single "delivers that same signature punch, but the core is a distinctive and exciting melody". Hartel Smith of Dance Rebels said "The song features an interesting kick drum pattern over the drop. It's something we haven't seen yet in big room tracks. The drop also has sort of a Middle Eastern/Indian/Ethnic sound to it, which is also very interesting. The melody is also great. It has a very intense and somewhat dark sound to it". That same month, he released a remix of "House of Gold" by Twenty One Pilots, as well as a remix of "Find You" by Zedd featuring Matthew Koma and Miriam Bryant. A month later, he released a remix of "Wizard" by Martin Garrix and Jay Hardway. On April 18, 2014, he performed at Molenheide in Schijndel, Netherlands during Paaspop 2014.

In May 2014, he announced the Revolt tour, on which he performed in various North American cities such as New York City and Los Angeles from July 10 until August 2, 2014. Afterwards, he released the track "Liberate" featuring Maura Hope as a gift for 100 likes on his Facebook page. On July 7, 2014, he released the single "Revolt" on Doorn Records, which all of the sales from Beatport were subsequently donated to the organization UNICEF. On August 11, 2014, he released "Freedom", a collaboration with Jay Hardway on Spinnin' Records. It was played by Martin Garrix on BBC Radio 1. On September 16, 2014, he released a remix of "Chains" by Nick Jonas. He ended 2014 by releasing remixes of "Breathe" by The Prodigy and "Numb/Encore" by Jay Z and Linkin Park, and the track "Earthquake" as free download.

To start off 2015, he collaborated with Jetfire for the single "Desert Storm", which was released on February 6 on Doorn Records. Elliott Brockelbank of EDMTunes stated that the single "comes in hot with trotting kick drum, subdued vocalizing and a winding synth", that "A small anti-drop follows, and the build up begins again with a notably Arabic themed set of synths", and that "The real drop hits with a fiery melody atop the intro's vocals, and the spirit of the desert comes alive with a whirlwind of energy". That same month, he released "Shots Fired", a collaboration with Mightyfools on Calvin Harris' label Fly Eye Records. T.H.E - Music Essentials stated that the track "quickly moves to heavy electro terrain where loud acid bleeps, vocal snippets and furious drops get things moving". Afterwards, he released two singles that summer, including "Telephone" with DVBBS and "Lovestruck" with Borgeous. He then released two singles on his own label Megaton Records, including "Hit the Streets" and "Burn the Maps" with Spencer Tarring. He ended 2015 with "World On Fire", collaborating with 7 Skies, which was released as a free download on Spinnin' Premium on December 11.

=== 2016: Spinnin' contract termination and Armada Music deal ===
On February 8, 2016, Hawkins announced that he decided to leave Spinnin' Records due to him and the label agreeing to end their deal. "World On Fire" with 7 Skies was his last release on the label. Afterwards, he signed a contract with Armada Music, and released the single "Follow" featuring Disfunk and Oisín. His first release on the label is a mix of progressive house with elements of old-fashioned synthwave. It was followed by his second single "Louder". He then released his third single on the label, titled "I Just Wanna Know". His fourth single on the label, "Hollywood", was released on September. In October, he performed at the Amsterdam Dance Event in Amsterdam during the "Armada Invites: ADE Special".

=== 2017: Vaypor ===
In May 2017, Hawkins founded his second own record label Vaypor in collaboration with Armada Music. His track "Bad Blood" featuring Raphaella was the first release on the label. A remix pack for the song was later released featuring remixes from Hawkins himself, Main Engine and Impera. Less than a month later, the single "Klobber" was released on that same label. His third single on the label, "Undercover", was released on August 4, 2017.

=== 2024: Grammy nomination for Best Dance Pop Recording ===
In 2024, Hawkins was nominated for a Grammy Award for Best Dance Pop Recording for David Guetta, Anne-Marie, Coi Leray's song "Baby Don't Hurt Me" (which he had co-produced with Guetta, Johnny Goldstein and Toby Green), alongside Guetta, Anne-Marie, Leray, Goldstein, Green and Serban Ghenea.

== Discography ==
=== Singles ===
- 2009: "Dark Matter / Into Sound" [Tone Diary]
- 2010: "Get You Down" (featuring Gregory Boyd) [Sound of Copenhagen]
- 2011: "Just Be You" (with Thomas Sagstad featuring Gregory Boyd) [Agape Music]
- 2011: "Cherrycoke / Not Another Anthem" (with Pablo Oliveros) [Tone Diary]
- 2012: "Common Ground" (with Pablo Oliveros featuring Gregory Boyd) [Oxygen]
- 2012: "Slump" (with Pablo Oliveros) [Oxygen]
- 2012: "Floripa" [Megaton Records]
- 2012: "Shut the Place Down" (versus Jay Colin) [Positiva Records]
- 2012: "More Machines" [FREE]
- 2012: "This Is How We Roll" (with Pablo Oliveros) [Megaton Records]
- 2012: "Expand" (with Pablo Oliveros) [Megaton Records]
- 2013: "Trigger Warning" [Megaton Records]
- 2013: "SRSLY Cool" (with Dem Slackers) [Megaton Records]
- 2013: "EDM CPH" (with TooManyLeftHands and Alexander Brown) [disco:wax]
- 2013: "Jump!" (with Pablo Oliveros and Henry Fong) [Hysteria Recs]
- 2013: "Bangover" (with Pablo Oliveros) [Tone Diary]
- 2013: "Let's Go" (with Sebjak) [Ultra]
- 2013: "Hot Steppa" (with Henry Fong and Toby Green) [Spinnin' Records]
- 2013: "We Got This" (with Toby Green) [Megaton Records]
- 2013: "Ulysses" (with Marcus Schössow and Pablo Oliveros) [Size Records]
- 2014: "Soldiers" [Doorn Records]
- 2014: "Liberate" (featuring Maura Hope) [FREE]
- 2014: "Revolt" [Doorn Records]
- 2014: "Freedom" (with Jay Hardway) [Spinnin' Records]
- 2014: "Earthquake" [FREE]
- 2015: "Desert Storm" (with Jetfire) [Doorn Records]
- 2015: "Shots Fired" (with Mightyfools) [Fly Eye Records]
- 2015: "Telephone" (with DVBBS) [FREE]
- 2015: "Lovestruck" (with Borgeous) [Spinnin' Records]
- 2015: "Hit the Streets" [Megaton Records]
- 2015: "Burn the Maps" (with Spencer Tarring) [Megaton Records]
- 2015: "World on Fire" (with 7 Skies) [FREE / Spinnin' Premium]
- 2016: "Follow" (featuring Disfunk and Oisín) [Armada Music]
- 2016: "Louder" [Armada Music]
- 2016: "I Just Wanna Know" [Armada Music]
- 2016: "Hollywood" [Armada Music]
- 2017: "Bad Blood" (featuring Raphaella) [Vaypor/Armada Music]
- 2017: "Klobber" [Vaypor/Armada Music]
- 2017: "Undercover" [Vaypor/Armada Music]
- 2018: "Crocodile" [Vaypor/Armada Music]
- 2018: "Let U Go" [Lowly Palace]
- 2019: "No More Tears" [Lowly Palace]
- 2019: "Mistakes" (with Zookeepers) [Spinnin' Records]
- 2019: "Going Down" [Lowly Palace]
- 2019: "I Want Your Soul" [Lowly Palace]
- 2020: "Blackout" [Lowly.]

=== Remixes ===
- 2010: Trafik - "Paid Up in Full" (Thomas Sagstad & Mike Hawkins Remix) [GU[MUSIC] Digital (Global Underground)]
- 2011: Kenneth Thomas feat. Roberta Harrison & Steven Taetz - "Drive" (Thomas Sagstad & Mike Hawkins Remix) [Perfecto Records]
- 2011: Wally Lopez - "Yeah" (Thomas Sagstad & Mike Hawkins Remix) [Global Underground]
- 2011: Morten Hampenberg & Alexander Brown feat. Stine Bramsen - "I Want You (To Want Me Back)" (Mike Hawkins & Pablo Oliveros Remix) [Ultra]
- 2011: Serge Devant feat. Coyle Girelli - "On Your Own" (Thomas Sagstad & Mike Hawkins Remix) [Ultra]
- 2011: In The Screen feat. Rachael Starr - "We Are the Night" (Thomas Sagstad & Mike Hawkins Remix) [Subliminal Records]
- 2012: Ryan Mendoza - "Focus" (Mike Hawkins Remix) [Tone Diary]
- 2012: Hampenberg & Alexander Brown feat. Pitbull, Fatman Scoop & Nabiha - "Raise the Roof" (Mike Hawkins & Pablo Oliveros Ravemode Remix) [disco:wax]
- 2012: John Dahlbäck feat. Erik Hassle - "One Last Ride" (Mike Hawkins Reboot) [FREE]
- 2012: Turboweekend - "On My Side" (Mike Hawkins Remix) [EMI]
- 2012: Sebjak - "Follow Me" (Mike Hawkins Remix) [Virgin Records]
- 2013: Linkin Park - "Castle of Glass" (Mike Hawkins Bootleg) [FREE]
- 2013: Toby Green - "Quillion" (Mike Hawkins & Pablo Oliveros Edit) [Megaton Records]
- 2013: The White Stripes - "Seven Nation Army" (Mike Hawkins Timewarp Remix) [FREE]
- 2013: Paul Oakenfold feat. JHart - "Touched By You" (Mike Hawkins Radio Edit) [Perfecto Records]
- 2013: The Mountains - "The Mountains" (Mike Hawkins Remix) [Parlophone Music Denmark]
- 2014: Twenty One Pilots - "House of Gold" (Mike Hawkins Remix) [Fueled By Ramen]
- 2014: Zedd feat. Matthew Koma & Miriam Bryant - "Find You" (Mike Hawkins Remix) [Interscope Records]
- 2014: Martin Garrix & Jay Hardway - "Wizard" (Mike Hawkins Remix) [SPRS]
- 2014: Nick Jonas - "Chains" (Mike Hawkins Remix) [Island Records]
- 2014: The Prodigy - "Breathe" (Mike Hawkins Roots Remix) [FREE]
- 2014: Jay Z & Linkin Park - "Numb/Encore" (Mike Hawkins Roots Remix) [FREE]
- 2017: Mike Hawkins feat. Raphaella - "Bad Blood" (Mike Hawkins Afterhours Remix) [VAYPOR]
- 2017: Armin Van Buuren feat. Josh Cumbee - "Sunny Days" (Mike Hawkins Remix)
