= Tremor (song) =

Single by Martin Garrix, Dimitri Vegas & Like Mike

from the EP Gold Skies
- Released: 21 April 2014
- Recorded: 2013
- Genre: Big room house
- Length: 4:54; 3:14 (radio edit)
- Label: Spinnin'
- Songwriters: Dimitri Thivaios; Martijn Garritsen; Michael Thivaios

Martin Garrix singles chronology
"Helicopter" (2014)	"Tremor" (2014)	"Gold Skies" (2014)

Dimitri Vegas & Like Mike singles chronology
"Stampede" (2013)	"Tremor" (2014)	"Eparrei" (2014)

"Tremor" is a song by Dutch DJ and record producer Martin Garrix and Belgian DJ duo Dimitri Vegas & Like Mike. The song was released by Spinnin' Records as the official 2014 anthem for Dutch dance event Sensation. It was released as a digital download on 20 April 2014 on Beatport and on 20 June 2014 on iTunes in the United Kingdom. The song debuted at number 30 on the UK Singles Chart, and also charted in Belgium, France and the Netherlands. It was written by Dimitri Thivaios, Martijn Garritsen and Michael Thivaios.

It is considered one of the most popular big room house songs of all-time, along with "Animals" by Martin Garrix, "Epic" by Sandro Silva and Quintino, "Spaceman" by Hardwell and "Tsunami" by Dvbbs and Borgeous.

== Music video ==
A music video to accompany the release of "Tremor" was first released onto YouTube on 22 April 2014 at a total length of three minutes and nineteen seconds. The video was directed and produced by Dutch production company Studio Rewind, at the request of Spinnin' Records. The video features various clips interspersed with each other, of Garrix and the Thivaios brothers (Dimitri Vegas & Like Mike) performing live and crowds' reactions at various festivals, as well as clip of a model in a catsuit in a warehouse and a brief clip of a dancer.

== Chart performance ==
=== Weekly charts ===
Chart (2014)	Peak position
Austria (Ö3 Austria Top 40)	55
Belgium (Ultratop 50 Flanders)	3
Belgium (Ultratop 50 Wallonia)	26
France (SNEP)	116
Hungary (Dance Top 40)	33
Ireland (IRMA)	70
Netherlands (Dutch Top 40)	32
Netherlands (Single Top 100)	44
Scottish Singles Sales (Official Charts)	14
UK Dance (Official Charts)	10
UK Singles (Official Charts)	30
US Hot Dance/Electronic Songs (Billboard)	39

=== Year-end charts ===
Chart (2014)	Position
Belgium (Ultratop Flanders)	56
US Hot Dance/Electronic Songs (Billboard)	82

== Certifications ==
Region	Certification	Certified units/sales
Brazil (Pro-Música Brasil)	Gold	30,000^{‡}
^{‡} Sales+streaming figures based on certification alone.

== Release history ==
Region	Date	Format	Label
United Kingdom	20 June 2014	Digital download	Spinnin'
