= List of awards and nominations received by Martin Garrix =

Martin Garrix awards and nominations
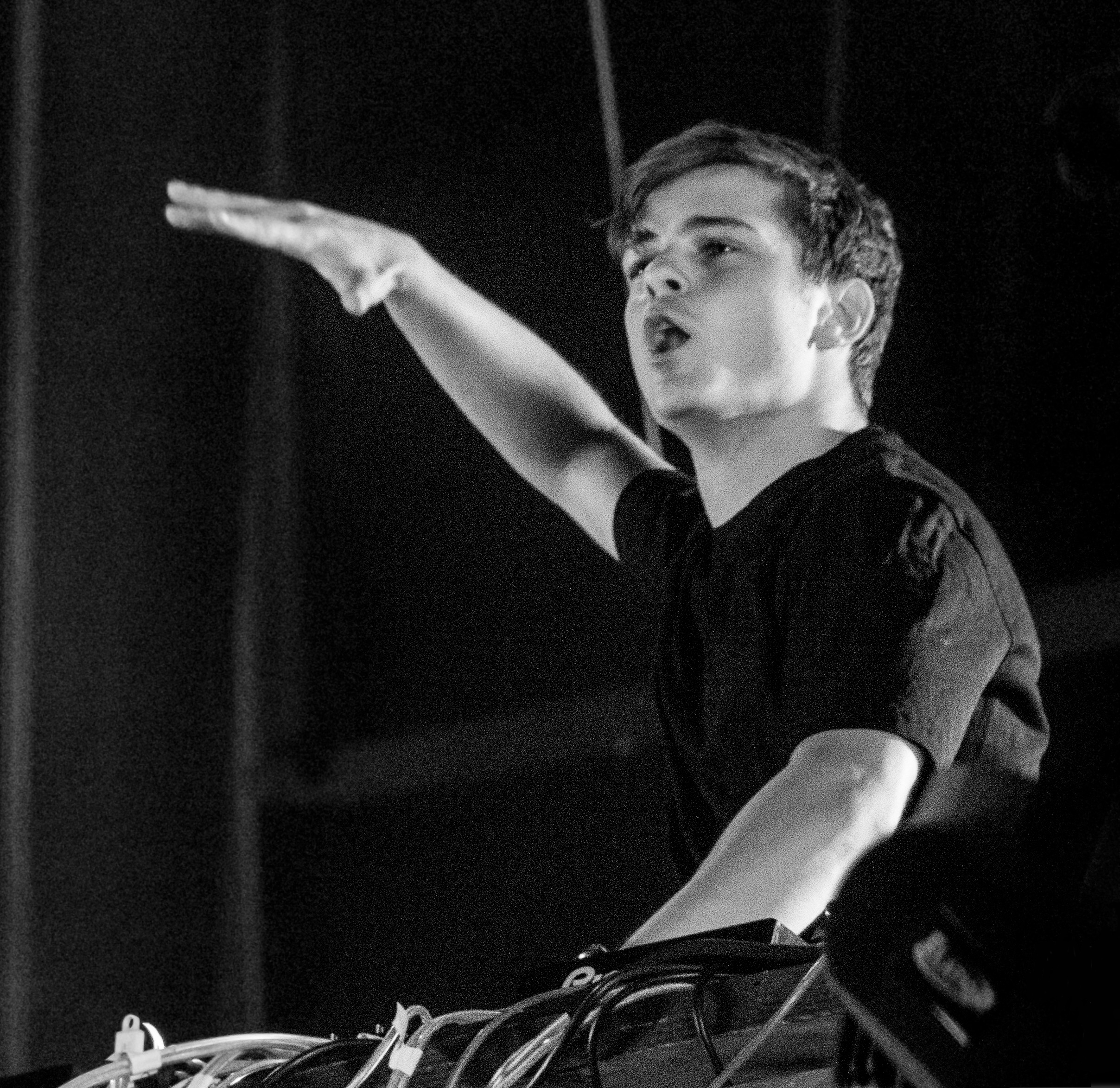
- Garrix at VELD 2016
Awards and nominations
| Award | Wins | Nominations |
| Echo | 0 | 1 |
| MTV Europe | 3 | 5 |
| MTV VMA | 0 | 1 |
| Teen Choice | 0 | 2 |
| World Music | 0 | 5 |
| Dance Music Awards | 3 | 3 |
| Young Hollywood Awards | 0 | 1 |
| NRJ DJ Awards | 2 | 2 |
| DJ Awards | 0 | 4 |
| International Dance Music Awards | 0 | 4 |
| WDM Radio Awards | 4 | 8 |

Totals (Note: Certain award groups do not simply award one winner. They acknowledge several different recipients, have runners-up, and have third place. Since this is a specific recognition and is different from losing an award, runner-up mentions are considered wins in this award tally. For simplification and to avoid errors, each award in this list has been presumed to have had a prior nomination.)
- Wins: 19
- Nominations: 27

== DJ Awards ==
| Year | Category | Recipient | Outcome | Ref(s) |
|---|---|---|---|---|
| 2015 | Best Electro/Progressive House | Martin Garrix | Nominated | |
| 2015 | Best International DJ | Martin Garrix | Nominated | |
| 2017 | Best International DJ | Martin Garrix | Nominated | |
| 2017 | Best Big Room House | Martin Garrix | Nominated | |

== DJ Magazine top 100 DJs ==
| Year | Position | Notes | Ref. |
|---|---|---|---|
| 2013 | 40 | New Entry | |
| 2014 | 4 | Up 36 | |
| 2015 | 3 | Up 1 | |
| 2016 | 1 | Up 2 (Note: Upon being named world's number one DJ in 2016, Martin Garrix became, and still is, the youngest ever number one DJ at 20 years old. This honour was previously held by fellow Dutch DJ Hardwell who won the award in 2013 aged 25.) | |
| 2017 | 1 | No Change | |
| 2018 | 1 | No Change | |
| 2019 | 2 | Down 1 | |
| 2020 | 3 | Down 1 | |
| 2021 | 2 | Up 1 | |
| 2022 | 1 | Up 1 | |
| 2023 | 3 | Down 2 | |
| 2024 | 1 | Up 2 | |
| 2025 | 2 | Down 1 | |
| 2026 | 2 | No Change | |

== Berlin Music Video Awards ==
| Year | Category | Recipient | Outcome |
|---|---|---|---|
| 2022 | Best Cinematography | PRESSURE | Nominated |

== Echo Award ==
| Year | Category | Recipient | Outcome | Ref(s) |
|---|---|---|---|---|
| 2014 | Best Club / Dance Artist | Nominated | Martin Garrix | |

== Electronic Music Awards ==
| Year | Category | Recipient | Outcome | Ref(s) |
|---|---|---|---|---|
| 2017 | Single of the Year | "Scared to Be Lonely" | Nominated | |

== iHeartRadio Music Awards ==
| Year | Category | Recipient | Outcome | Ref(s) |
|---|---|---|---|---|
| 2015 | Dance Song of the Year | "Animals" | Nominated | |

== International Dance Music Awards ==
| Year | Category | Recipient | Outcome | Ref(s) |
|---|---|---|---|---|
| 2014 | Best Electro / Progressive Track | "Animals" | Won | |
| 2014 | Best Breakthrough DJ | Martin Garrix | Won | |
| 2014 | Best Breakthrough Artist (Solo) | Martin Garrix | Won | |
| 2015 | Best Electro / Progressive Track | "Gold Skies" | Nominated | |
| 2015 | Best Global DJ | Martin Garrix | Nominated | |
| 2015 | Best Artist (Solo) | Martin Garrix | Nominated | |
| 2016 | Best Electro / Progressive House Track | "The Only Way Is Up" | Nominated | |
| 2016 | Best Global DJ | Martin Garrix | Nominated | |
| 2018 | Best Male Artist (Mainstream) | Martin Garrix | Nominated | |
| 2018 | Best Song | "Scared to Be Lonely" | Nominated | |
| 2019 | Best Male Artist (Pop/Electronic) | Martin Garrix | Won | |
| 2020 | Best Male Artist (Dance/Electronic) | Martin Garrix | Nominated | |

== Kids' Choice Awards ==
| Year | Category | Recipient | Outcome | Ref(s) |
|---|---|---|---|---|
| 2017 | Favorite DJ/EDM Artist | Martin Garrix | Nominated | |

== MTV Europe Music Awards ==
| Year | Category | Recipient | Outcome | Ref(s) |
|---|---|---|---|---|
| 2014 | Best Dutch Act | Martin Garrix | Nominated | |
| 2015 | Best Electronic | Martin Garrix | Won | |
| 2015 | Best Dutch Act | Martin Garrix | Nominated | |
| 2016 | Best Electronic | Martin Garrix | Won | |
| 2016 | Best World Stage Performance | Martin Garrix | Won | |
| 2018 | Best Electronic | Martin Garrix | Nominated | |

== MTV Millennial Awards ==
| Year | Category | Recipient | Outcome | Ref(s) |
|---|---|---|---|---|
| 2016 | Beat Guru | Martin Garrix | Won | |
| 2017 | Best DJ | Martin Garrix | Won | |
| 2017 | Worldwide Instagrammer of the Year | Martin Garrix | Nominated | |

== MTV Video Music Awards ==
| Year | Category | Recipient | Outcome | Ref(s) |
|---|---|---|---|---|
| 2014 | MTV Clubland Award | "Animals" | Nominated | |

== NRJ DJ Awards ==
| Year | Category | Recipient | Outcome | Ref(s) |
|---|---|---|---|---|
| 2014 | Best Music | "Animals" | Won | |
| 2014 | Best Live Performance | Martin Garrix | Won | |
| 2016 | Best International DJ | Martin Garrix | Won | |
| 2016 | Best Live Performance | Martin Garrix | Won | |

== Teen Choice Awards ==
| Year | Category | Recipient | Outcome | Ref(s) |
|---|---|---|---|---|
| 2014 | Choice Music: Electronic Dance Music Artist | Martin Garrix | Nominated | |
| 2014 | Choice Music: Electronic Music Dance Song | "Animals" | Nominated | |

== The Buma Awards ==
| Year | Category | Recipient | Outcome | Ref(s) |
|---|---|---|---|---|
| 2014 | Best International Song | "Animals" | Won | |

== WDM Radio Awards ==
| Year | Category | Recipient | Outcome | Ref(s) |
|---|---|---|---|---|
| 2017 | Best DJ | Martin Garrix | Won | |
| 2017 | Best Party DJ | Martin Garrix | Nominated | |
| 2017 | King of Social Media | Martin Garrix | Won | |
| 2017 | Best Global Track | "In the Name of Love" | Nominated | |
| 2018 | Best DJ | Martin Garrix | Won | |
| 2018 | Best Party DJ | Martin Garrix | Nominated | |
| 2018 | King of Social Media | Martin Garrix | Nominated | |
| 2018 | Best Bass Track | "Scared to Be Lonely" | Won | |

== World Music Awards ==
| Year | Category | Recipient | Outcome | Ref(s) |
|---|---|---|---|---|
| 2014 | World's Best Song | "Animals" | Nominated | |
| 2014 | World's Best Video | "Animals" | Nominated | |
| 2014 | Best Male Artist | Martin Garrix | Nominated | |
| 2014 | World's Best Entertainer of the Year | Martin Garrix | Nominated | |
| 2014 | Best Electronic Dance Music Artist | Martin Garrix | Nominated | |

== Young Hollywood Awards ==
| Year | Category | Recipient | Outcome | Ref(s) |
|---|---|---|---|---|
| 2014 | Breakout Music Artist | Martin Garrix | Nominated | |

== YouTube Creator Awards ==
- Martin Garrix
  (15 million subscribers - April 2022)
- STMPD RCRDS
  (700 thousand subscribers - April 2022)

== YouTube Music Awards ==
| Year | Category | Recipient | Outcome | Ref(s) |
|---|---|---|---|---|
| 2015 | 50 artists to watch | Martin Garrix | Won | |
