= Spaceman (Hardwell song) =

2012 single by Hardwell

Single by Hardwell

from the album Hardwell Presents Revealed Volume 3
- Released: 23 January 2012
- Genre: Big room house
- Length: 6:19 (original mix)
- Label: Revealed; Cloud 9 Dance
- Songwriter: Robbert van de Corput
- Producer: Hardwell

Hardwell singles chronology
"Cobra" (2011)	"Spaceman" (2012)	"Call Me a Spaceman" (2012)

"Call Me a Spaceman"

Single by Hardwell featuring Mitch Crown

from the album Hardwell Presents Revealed Volume 3
- Released: 18 May 2012
- Genre: Big room house
- Length: 3:09 (radio edit)
- Label: Revealed; Cloud 9 Dance
- Songwriters: Robbert van de Corput; Ronald Mitchel Kroon
- Producer: Hardwell

Hardwell singles chronology
"Spaceman" (2012)	"Call Me a Spaceman" (2012)	"How We Do" (2012)

Mitch Crown singles chronology
"Blizzard (Stars of Energy)" (2012)	"Call Me a Spaceman" (2012)	"Here I Come" (2012)

"Spaceman" is a single by Dutch DJ and record producer Hardwell. It was released for digital download on 23 January 2012. A second version called "Call Me a Spaceman" featuring vocals by Dutch singer Mitch Crown was released on 18 May 2012. Another vocal version was created in collaboration with Bright Lights. Despite Hardwell claiming that the latter was his favorite, his management decided to rather release "Call Me a Spaceman". Titled as "Mr. Spaceman" Bright Lights offered the track as a free download in late 2015. For "Spaceman"'s five-years anniversary he released the remastered Bright Lights version as "Mr. Spaceman (2017 edit)".

It is considered one of the most popular big room house songs of all-time along with "Animals" by Martin Garrix, "Epic" by Sandro Silva and Quintino, "Tsunami" by Dvbbs and Borgeous and "Tremor" by Martin Garrix and Dimitri Vegas & Like Mike.

A 2022 rework of the song, which had previously been uploaded exclusively on SoundCloud, was released on the deluxe edition of his album Rebels Never Die.

== Music video ==
On 18 May 2012, Hardwell uploaded the music video for "Call Me A Spaceman" on his YouTube account.

== Track listing ==
- Digital download
1. "Spaceman" – 6:19
- Digital download
1. "Call Me a Spaceman" (radio edit) (featuring Mitch Crown) – 3:09
2. "Call Me a Spaceman" (extended mix) (featuring Mitch Crown) – 6:19
- Digital download (Carnage Festival Trap remix)
1. "Spaceman" (Carnage Festival Trap remix) – 3:54
- Digital download – EP
1. "Spaceman" (original mix) – 6:19
2. "Spaceman" (Headhunterz remix) – 5:42
3. "Spaceman" (Drown the Fish remix) – 4:24
4. "Spaceman" (Naffz remix) – 4:35
5. "Call Me a Spaceman" (radio edit) (featuring Mitch Crown) – 3:09
6. "Call Me a Spaceman" (extended mix) (featuring Mitch Crown) – 6:19
- Digital download (Outer Space remixes) – EP
1. "Spaceman" (Headhunterz remix) – 5:42
2. "Spaceman" (Drown the Fish remix) – 4:24
3. "Spaceman" (Naffz remix) – 4:35
- Dr Phunk Remix
1. "Spaceman" (Dr Phunk Remix) – 3:42

== Charts ==
=== Weekly charts ===
Weekly chart performance for "Spaceman"
Chart (2012–13)	Peak position
Belgium (Ultratip Bubbling Under Flanders)	5
Belgium (Ultratip Bubbling Under Wallonia)	14
France (SNEP)	79
Netherlands (Dutch Top 40)	34
US Hot Dance/Electronic Songs (Billboard)	19

=== Year-end charts ===
Year-end chart performance for "Spaceman"
Chart (2012)	Position
France (SNEP)	190
Chart (2013)	Position
US Hot Dance/Electronic Songs (Billboard)	52

== Certifications ==
Certifications for "Spaceman"
Region	Certification	Certified units/sales
United States (RIAA)	Gold	500,000^{‡}
^{‡} Sales+streaming figures based on certification alone.
