= Proxy (song) =

Single by Martin Garrix

from the EP Gold Skies
- Released: 2 July 2014
- Genre: Big room house; electro house
- Length: 4:38
- Label: Spinnin'
- Songwriters: Martin Garrix; Jay Hardway
- Producers: Martin Garrix; Jay Hardway (co.)

Martin Garrix singles chronology
"Gold Skies" (2014)	"Proxy" (2014)	"Turn Up the Speakers" (2014)

"Proxy" is a song by Dutch DJ and record producer Martin Garrix. It was released as a free download on 6 March 2014 and on 2 July 2014 on iTunes. The song has charted in the Netherlands.

== Charts ==
Chart (2014)	Peak position
Netherlands (Single Top 100)	89

== Release history ==
Region	Date	Format	Label
Netherlands	2 July 2014	Digital download	Spinnin'
