= Gold Skies (EP) =

EP by Martin Garrix
- Released: 8 July 2014
- Genre: Big room house; progressive house
- Length: 24:43
- Label: Casablanca; Spinnin'; School Boy
- Producer: Martin Garrix; Sander van Doorn; DVBBS; Dimitri Vegas & Like Mike; Jay Hardway

Martin Garrix chronology
Gold Skies (2014)	Break Through the Silence (2015)

Singles from Gold Skies
- 1. "Animals" Released: 17 June 2013; 2. "Wizard" Released: 2 December 2013; 3. "Tremor" Released: 21 April 2014; 4. "Gold Skies" Released: 2 June 2014; 5. "Proxy" Released: 2 July 2014

Gold Skies is the debut EP by Dutch DJ and record producer Martin Garrix. It was released as a digital download on 8 July 2014 on iTunes in North American countries. The EP includes the singles "Animals", "Wizard", "Tremor", "Gold Skies" and "Proxy".

== Singles ==
- "Animals" was released as the lead single from the EP on 17 June 2013.
- "Wizard" was released as the second single from the EP on 2 December 2013.
- "Tremor" was released as the third single from the EP on 21 April 2014.
- "Gold Skies" was released as the fourth single from the EP on 2 June 2014.
- "Proxy" was released as the fifth and final single from the EP on 2 July 2014.

== Track listing ==
All songs written and composed by Martijn Garritsen (Martin Garrix).

Digital EP track listing
No.	Title	Writer(s)	Producer(s)	Length
1.	"Gold Skies" (with Sander van Doorn and DVBBS featuring Aleesia)	Sander Ketelaars; Martijn Garritsen; Christopher Van Den Hoef; Alexander Van Den Hoef; Alicia Stamkos	Sander van Doorn; Martin Garrix; DVBBS	5:28
2.	"Animals"	Martijn Garritsen	Martin Garrix	5:03
3.	"Proxy"	Martijn Garritsen; Jobke Heiblom	Martin Garrix; Jay Hardway (co.)	4:37
4.	"Tremor" (with Dimitri Vegas & Like Mike)	Dimitri Thivaios; Martijn Garritsen; Michael Thivaios	Dimitri Vegas & Like Mike; Martin Garrix	4:54
5.	"Wizard" (with Jay Hardway)	Martijn Garritsen; Jobke Heiblom	Martin Garrix; Jay Hardway	4:41
Total length:				24:33

CD track listing
No.	Title	Writer(s)	Producer(s)	Length
1.	"Gold Skies" (with Sander van Doorn and DVBBS featuring Aleesia)	Sander Ketelaars; Martijn Garritsen; Christopher Van Den Hoef; Alexander Van Den Hoef; Alicia Stamkos	Sander van Doorn; Martin Garrix; DVBBS	5:28
2.	"Animals"	Martijn Garritsen	Martin Garrix	5:04
3.	"Proxy"	Martijn Garritsen; Jobke Heiblom	Martin Garrix; Jay Hardway	4:38
4.	"Wizard" (with Jay Hardway)	Martijn Garritsen; Jobke Heiblom	Martin Garrix; Jay Hardway	4:42
5.	"Tremor" (with Dimitri Vegas and Like Mike)	Dimitri Thivaios; Martijn Garritsen; Michael Thivaios	Dimitri Vegas; Martin Garrix; Like Mike	4:55
6.	"Animals" (Oliver Heldens Remix)	Martijn Garritsen	Martin Garrix; Oliver Heldens^{[a]}	4:24
7.	"Wizard" (Yellow Claw Remix) (with Jay Hardway)	Martijn Garritsen; Jobke Heiblom	Martin Garrix; Jay Hardway; Yellow Claw^{[a]}	3:39
8.	"Animals" (Victor Niglio and Martin Garrix Festival Trap Mix)	Martijn Garritsen	Martin Garrix^{[a]}; Victor Niglio^{[a]}	3:19
Total length:				36:09

Notes

- ^{^[a]} signifies a remixer

== Charts ==
Chart performance for Gold Skies
Chart (2014)	Peak position
US Billboard 200	171
US Top Dance/Electronic Albums (Billboard)	6
US Heatseekers Albums (Billboard)	6

== Release history ==
Release history and formats for Gold Skies
Region	Date	Format	Label
North America	8 July 2014	Digital download	Casablanca; Spinnin'; School Boy
North America	12 August 2014	CD	Spinnin'; Silent; Republic
