= Firebeatz =

Dutch DJ and music production duo

- Origin: Tilburg, Netherlands
- Genres: Tech house; electro house; big room house; Dutch house; progressive house; future house
- Occupations: DJs, producers
- Instruments: Keyboards, turntables, Logic Pro, FL Studio, Apple Mac
- Years active: 2008–present
- Labels: Spinnin' Records; Doorn Records; Revealed; Musical Freedom; Armada Music; Ignite Recordings
- Members: Tim Benjamin Smulders; Jurre van Doeselaar
- Website: firebeatz.com

Firebeatz is a Dutch DJ and music production duo consisting of Tim Benjamin Smulders (Dutch pronunciation: [ˈtɪm ˈbɛɲamɪn ˈsmʏldərs]; born 14 August 1985) and Jurre van Doeselaar (pronounced [ˈjʏrə vɑn ˈdusəlaːr]; born 7 July 1987). The duo formed in Tilburg in 2008, and gained fame in the EDM scene through their dance floor hits like "Dear New York", "Here We F*cking Go" and "Helicopter". The duo has since worked with well-known artists such as Calvin Harris, Tiësto and Martin Garrix.

== Music career ==
Tim and Jurre met at the School of Arts in Tilburg, the Netherlands and discovered a similar interest in music. Their chemistry prompted them to form Firebeatz in 2008. Their early releases, "Funky Shit", "Where's Your Head At", "Miniman", "Dear New York" and "Here We F*cking Go" ranked highly on the Beatport dance charts.

Their collaboration with Chocolate Puma, "Just One More Time Baby", aired on BBC Radio 1 DJ Pete Tong's show and received good audience feedback. The track went on to top the Beatport House chart for many weeks. "Dear New York", a collaboration with Schella, also became one of their biggest hits and reached No. 2 on the Beatport Main Top 100.

In 2013, Firebeatz continued the momentum with "Gangster" which reached the Beatport Top 20. Subsequently, they released a collaboration with Bobby Burns in "Ding Dong" on Tiësto's Musical Freedom label. "Yeahhhh" was released on Calvin Harris's Fly Eye Records and the duo was invited to make an exclusive remix of Calvin Harris and Ayah Marar's collaboration, "Thinking About You". Their track "Wonderful" gained support by established DJs such as Afrojack, Chuckie, Sander van Doorn, Dimitri Vegas & Like Mike, Thomas Gold and R3hab.

"Max Ammo", released December 2013, reached the Beatport Top 20. Their collaboration with Martin Garrix, "Helicopter", achieved No. 1 on Beatport, as well as charting in Belgium, France and the Netherlands. "Guitar Track", a collaboration with Sander van Doorn was released in March 2014 after it was initially previewed with their identities hidden. In June 2014, Firebeatz worked alongside Tiësto and Ladyhawke to release "Last Train", which was featured on Tiësto's fifth studio album, A Town Called Paradise. The duo also featured on Calvin Harris's fourth studio album Motion with the collaborative track, "It Was You", in November 2014.

Firebeatz also successfully managed to diversify and cross over to other genres by collaborating with artists such as Pitbull, James Blunt, Ian Carey, Snoop Dogg, Freestylers, Flo Rida, Timbaland, Fatman Scoop, Alex Gaudino, Wynter Gordon, Bingo Players and Sean Paul. The latter two collaborations reached Beatport's Main Top 15.

In 2018, Firebeatz and DubVision formed the supergroup METAFO4R, and performed together for the first time at EDC Las Vegas 2018.

== Discography ==
=== Singles ===
==== Charted singles ====
Title	Year	Peak chart positions			Album
Title	Year	NLD	BEL	FRA	Album
"Helicopter" (with Martin Garrix)	2014	59	33	98	Non-album singles
"I Can't Understand" (with Chocolate Puma)	2014	—	66	—	Non-album singles
"—" denotes a recording that did not chart or was not released.

==== Non-charting singles ====
===== As lead artist =====
- 2011: Firebeatz – Funky Shit [Spinnin']
- 2012: Firebeatz – Where's Your Head At [Spinnin']
- 2012: Firebeatz – Miniman [Spinnin']
- 2012: Firebeatz & JoeySuki – Reckless [Spinnin']
- 2012: Firebeatz & Chocolate Puma – Just One More Time Baby [Spinnin']
- 2012: Firebeatz & Schella – Dear New York [Spinnin']
- 2012: Firebeatz – Here We F*Cking Go [Revealed]
- 2012: Firebeatz – Disque [Spinnin']
- 2013: Firebeatz – Gangster [Spinnin']
- 2013: Firebeatz – Yeahhh [Fly Eye (Spinnin')]
- 2013: Firebeatz & Bobby Burns – Ding Dong [Musical Freedom]
- 2013: Firebeatz – Wonderful [Spinnin']
- 2013: Firebeatz & Chocolate Puma – Sausage Fest [Spinnin']
- 2013: Firebeatz & Schella – Wicked [Spinnin']
- 2013: Firebeatz – Max Ammo [Doorn (Spinnin')]
- 2014: DubVision & Firebeatz – Rockin' [Spinnin']
- 2014: Firebeatz – Bazooka [Spinnin']
- 2014: Firebeatz – Bombaclat [Spinnin' (Free)]
- 2017: Firebeatz – Ignite [Free]
- 2017: Firebeatz and Lucas & Steve – Show Me Your Love [Spinnin' Premium (Spinnin')]
- 2017: Firebeatz – Till The Sun Comes Up [Ignite (Armada)]
- 2017: Firebeatz and Apster – Let's Get Wild [Ignite (Armada)]
- 2017: Lucas & Steve and Firebeatz – Keep Your Head Up [Spinnin']
- 2017: Firebeatz – Burn It Down [Ignite (Armada)]
- 2018: Firebeatz and Peppermint featuring Aiden O'Brien – Everything [Ignite (Armada)]
- 2018: Firebeatz and Madison Mars – Rock Right Now [Ignite (Armada)]
- 2018: Firebeatz – Remember Who You Are [Ignite (Armada)]
- 2018: Chocolate Puma and Firebeatz – Blackout [Musical Freedom]
- 2018: Firebeatz and Yozo – Rock to the Rhythm [Armada]
- 2019: Firebeatz and Schella – Through My Mind [Armada]
- 2019: Firebeatz and Schella & Pexem – Bounce [Heldeep (Spinnin')]
- 2019: Sander van Doorn and Firebeatz – Blowback [Doorn (Spinnin')]
- 2019: Nervo and Firebeatz – Illusion [Spinnin' Records]
- 2019: Oliver Heldens, Firebeatz and Schella featuring Carla Monroe – Lift Me Up [Heldeep (Spinnin')]
- 2019: DubVision and Firebeatz – Lambo [Stmpd]
- 2020: Chocolate Puma and Firebeatz – Soul Fifty [Spinnin' Records]
- 2020: Firebeatz – Bad Habit [Spinnin' Records]
- 2020: Firebeatz and Plastik Funk – High Enough [Spinnin' Records]
- 2020: Firebeatz – Sinfonia Della Notte [Heldeep (Spinnin')]
- 2020: Firebeatz featuring Brooke Tomlinson – Never Enough [Spinnin' Records]
- 2020: Firebeatz – Instant Moments [Spinnin' Records]
- 2020: Firebeatz – Let's Get Down [Spinnin' Records]
- 2021: Firebeatz – Show The Way [Heldeep (Spinnin')]
- 2021: Firebeatz featuring Ally Ahern – I Wanna (Na, na, na) [Spinnin' Records]
- 2021: Firebeatz and Arengers featuring S.e.n – Way Down [Spinnin' Records]
- 2021: Firebeatz – Resurrect [Ignite Records]
- 2022: Firebeatz and Dubdogz – Give It Up [Spinnin' Records]
- 2022: Firebeatz and Stefy De Cicco – Everybody's Got to Learn Sometime (feat. Sushy) [Spinnin' Records]
- 2022: Firebeatz – Don't Stop Moving [Spinnin' Records]
- 2022: Firebeatz and Jay Hardway – No Good [Spinnin' Records]
- 2022: Firebeatz – Where's Your Head At (Kill It with Fire Mix) [Spinnin' Records]
- 2022: Firebeatz and Chocolate Puma – Listen Up [Musical Freedom / Spinnin' Records]
- 2022: Firebeatz and DAMANTE – What Happens Here [Spinnin' Records]
- 2022: Firebeatz – Lose My Sh!t [STMPD RCRDS]
- 2023: Firebeatz – Back in Control [STMPD RCRDS]
- 2023: Firebeatz – California [RAVE CULTURE]
- 2023: Firebeatz – The Party [RAVE CULTURE]
- 2023: Firebeatz – Superfreak [Spinnin' Records]
- 2023: Firebeatz – Shined on Me [Spinnin' Records]
- 2023: Mike Williams and Firebeatz – Womp [Spinnin' Records]

===== As METAFO4R =====
- 2018: Best Part of Me [Spinnin']
- 2019: Rave Machine [Spinnin']
- 2020: Grollow [Spinnin' Records]

=== Remixes ===
- 2012: P!nk – "Blow Me (One Last Kiss)" (Firebeatz Remix) [RCA Records]
- 2012: Justin Timberlake – Suit and Tie (Firebeatz Remix) [RCA Records]
- 2013: Britney Spears, Will.i.am – "It Should Be Easy" (Firebeatz Remix) [Sony Music Entertainment]
- 2013: Rihanna – What Now (Firebeatz Remix) [The Island Def Jam Music Group]
- 2014: Rune RK – Calabria (Firebeatz Remix) [Musical Freedom Records]
- 2016: Dimitri Vegas & Like Mike – Stay A While (Firebeatz Remix) [Smash The House]
- 2019: Funkstar De Luxe – "Sun Is Shining" (Firebeatz Remix) [Armada Music]
- 2019: Marshmello and Kane Brown – "One Thing Right" (Firebeatz Remix) [Joytime Collective]
