= I Will Find You (disambiguation) =

I Will Find You is an American crime drama television miniseries adapted from a 2023 Harlan Coben novel.

I Will Find You may also refer to:

- "I Will Find You", song by S Club 7 from their 2001 album Sunshine
- Te Encontraré (Spanish for I Will Find You), 2006 album by Idaira

== See also ==
- Find You (disambiguation)
- "I'll Find You", 2017 song by Lecrae featuring Tori Kelly
- I'll Find You (film), 2019 American romantic war drama
