= Helicopter (Martin Garrix and Firebeatz song) =

Single by Martin Garrix and Firebeatz
- Released: 17 February 2014
- Genre: Big room house
- Length: 4:37
- Label: Spinnin'
- Songwriters: Martin Garrix; Firebeatz
- Producers: Martin Garrix; Firebeatz

Martin Garrix singles chronology
"Wizard" (2013)	"Helicopter" (2014)	"Tremor" (2014)

Firebeatz singles chronology
"Rockin" (2014)	"Helicopter" (2014)	"Guitar Track" (2014)

"Helicopter" is a track by Dutch DJ and record producer Martin Garrix and Dutch music producing duo Firebeatz. It was released as a digital download on 17 February 2014 on Beatport and on 10 March 2014 on iTunes. The track has charted in Belgium, France and the Netherlands. The track was produced by Martin Garrix and Firebeatz.

== Charts ==
Chart (2014)	Peak position
Belgium (Ultratop 50 Flanders)	33
Belgium (Ultratop 50 Wallonia)	42
France (SNEP)	98
Netherlands (Single Top 100)	59

== Release history ==
Region	Date	Format	Label
Netherlands	10 March 2014	Digital download	Spinnin'
United Kingdom	10 March 2014	Digital download	Spinnin'
