= Rebels Never Die =

Studio album by Hardwell
- Released: 9 September 2022
- Recorded: 2019–2022
- Genre: Future rave; techno
- Length: 54:56
- Label: Revealed
- Producer: Hardwell

Hardwell chronology
United We Are (2015)	Rebels Never Die (2022)

Singles from Rebels Never Die
- 1. "Broken Mirror" Released: 1 April 2022; 2. "Into the Unknown" Released: 1 April 2022; 3. "F*cking Society" Released: 15 April 2022; 4. "Black Magic" Released: 29 April 2022; 5. "Dopamine" Released: 13 May 2022; 6. "Godd" Released: 27 May 2022; 7. "Pacman" Released: 10 June 2022; 8. "Mind Control" Released: 24 June 2022; 9. "Reminisce" Released: 8 July 2022; 10. "Zero Gravity" Released: 15 July 2022; 11. "Laser" Released: 29 July 2022; 12. "I Feel Like Dancing" Released: 12 August 2022; 13. "Self Destruct" Released: 26 August 2022

Rebels Never Die is the second studio album by Dutch DJ and record producer Hardwell. It was released on 9 September 2022 by his own record label, Revealed Recordings.

== History ==
On 7 September 2018, Hardwell had announced his indefinite hiatus from touring, stating that he wanted to focus more on his personal life. On 27 March 2022, he made his return to the dance scene by closing out the Ultra Miami 2022 festival as the rumored special guest. During his set, he played 13 IDs that introduced his new bigroom-techno style and would be released as part of his upcoming album. Additionally, he played a 10-year anniversary remix of his song "Spaceman".

On 1 April, Hardwell released the first two singles from the album, "Broken Mirror" and "Into the Unknown". "Broken Mirror" features a monologue from Hardwell, saying "...your opinion of me does not define who I am. Cause I know what you want me to be. Now, I'm gonna show you who I truly am." "Into the Unknown" was the first of the singles to introduce the bigroom-techno style of his album.

Hardwell released the IDs as singles from the album every two weeks. However, on 15 July, he released "Zero Gravity" a week after the album's previous single to generate excitement for his four-year return to Tomorrowland.

On 9 September, he released the Rebels Never Die album, featuring the last unreleased ID from his set, the titular song. Rebels Never Die appeared on Dancing Astronaut's Top Dance Albums of 2022 list.

On 23 December, the deluxe version of Rebels Never Die was released. It features a new original, "Oh Gosh", three reworks of previous Hardwell songs, and a mashup of "F*cking Society" and Metallica's "Nothing Else Matters".

== Album description ==
Hardwell used his hiatus as an opportunity to explore creative freedom. He was inspired to create Rebels Never Die from a vinyl collection he listened to in his childhood.

The bigroom-techno sound of Rebels Never Die has been described as "future techno" and "future rave". It is a bold switch-up from Hardwell's euphoric big room house style, replacing anthemic vocals with cerebral, spine-chilling samples.

Hardwell described the style of his album with:

"I hate to be caught up in one particular genre. I always try to make music I love to play out. I don't consider myself a mainstream artist, techno, or big room artist, I consider myself Hardwell, and this is what Hardwell is. If it's not a genre, then it's not a genre; it's just me."

== Track listing ==
Rebels Never Die track listing
No.	Title	Writer(s)	Producer(s)	Length
1.	"Broken Mirror"	Robbert van de Corput	Hardwell	2:22
2.	"Into the Unknown"	Corput	Hardwell	3:19
3.	"F*cking Society"	Corput; Oliver Klitzing	Hardwell	4:39
4.	"Black Magic"	Corput; Kelli Ali; Satoshi Tomiie	Hardwell	4:05
5.	"Dopamine"	Corput; Ruben Fernhout	Hardwell	3:45
6.	"Godd"	Corput; Benjamin Kuijten; Marco Verkuijlen	Hardwell	4:31
7.	"Pacman"	Corput	Hardwell	3:52
8.	"Mind Control"	Corput	Hardwell	4:08
9.	"Reminisce" (featuring Lee Grant)	Corput; Ardie van Beek; Lee Grant	Hardwell	4:01
10.	"Zero Gravity"	Corput	Hardwell	4:32
11.	"Laser"	Corput	Hardwell	2:54
12.	"I Feel Like Dancing"	Corput	Hardwell	3:45
13.	"Self Destruct"	Corput	Hardwell	4:02
14.	"Rebels Never Die"	Corput	Hardwell	4:15

Deluxe edition
No.	Title	Length
15.	"Oh Gosh"	4:29
16.	"Spaceman (Rebels Never Die Rework)"	6:20
17.	"Bigroom Never Dies (Rebels Never Die Rework)" (with Blasterjaxx featuring Mitch Crown)	3:39
18.	"Retrograde (Rebels Never Die Rework)"	5:49
19.	"Nothing Else Matters vs F*cking Society (Hardwell Mashup)" (with Metallica)	3:09

== Charts ==
Chart performance for Rebels Never Die
Chart (2022)	Peak position
Belgian Albums (Ultratop Wallonia)	146
Dutch Albums (Album Top 100)	29
