= Wizard (song) =

Single by Martin Garrix and Jay Hardway

from the EP Gold Skies
- Released: 2 December 2013
- Genre: Big room house
- Length: 4:41
- Label: Spinnin'
- Songwriters: Martijn Garritsen; Jobke Heiblom
- Producers: Martin Garrix; Jay Hardway

Martin Garrix singles chronology
"Animals" (2013)	"Wizard" (2013)	"Helicopter" (2014)

Jay Hardway singles chronology
"Error 404" (2013)	"Wizard" (2013)	"Bootcamp" (2014)

"Wizard" is a song by Dutch DJs and record producers Martin Garrix and Jay Hardway. It was released as a digital download on 2 December 2013 on iTunes. The song peaked at number 6 in Belgium, number 7 in the United Kingdom, and number 17 in the Netherlands. The song was written and produced by Garrix and Hardway.

== Composition ==
The song leads with a "spooky melody" and has similar elements to Garrix's previous single "Animals".

== Music video ==
A music video to accompany the release of "Wizard" was first released onto YouTube on 19 November 2013 at a total length of three minutes and thirty-seven seconds (actual length is three minutes and thirty-one seconds due to the record label's introduction). The clip features clips of Garrix and Hardway performing together as well as clips of people dancing to the song. The video has over 200 million views. Garrix's Vevo channel had also uploaded its music video on 13 February 2014 but not available for worldwide.

== Track listing ==
Digital download
No.	Title	Length
1.	"Wizard" (radio edit)	3:22
2.	"Wizard" (original mix)	4:41

Remixes
No.	Title	Length
1.	"Wizard" (Tchami Remix)	5:36
2.	"Wizard" (Mike Hawkins Remix)	3:35
3.	"Wizard" (Yellow Claw Remix)	3:38
4.	"Wizard" (Tom and Jame Remix)	4:45
Total length:		17:34

== Charts ==
=== Weekly charts ===
Weekly chart performance for "Wizard"
Chart (2013–2014)	Peak position
Austria (Ö3 Austria Top 40)	34
Belgium (Ultratop 50 Flanders)	6
Belgium (Ultratop 50 Wallonia)	8
Canada Hot 100 (Billboard)	67
Finland (Suomen virallinen lista)	10
France (SNEP)	31
Germany (GfK)	30
Ireland (IRMA)	26
Netherlands (Dutch Top 40)	13
Netherlands (Single Top 100)	16
Poland Airplay (ZPAV)	18
Poland (Polish Airplay TV)	3
Poland Dance (ZPAV)	10
Russia Airplay (TopHit)	6
Scottish Singles Sales (Official Charts)	4
Sweden (Sverigetopplistan)	21
Switzerland (Schweizer Hitparade)	29
UK Dance (Official Charts)	4
UK Singles (Official Charts)	7
Ukraine Airplay (TopHit)	82
US Dance Club Songs (Billboard)	41
US Hot Dance/Electronic Songs (Billboard)	16

=== Year-end charts ===
2013 year-end chart performance for "Wizard"
Chart (2013)	Position
Netherlands (Dutch Top 40)	118
Netherlands (Dance Top 30)	23

2014 year-end chart performance for "Wizard"
Chart (2014)	Position
Belgium (Ultratop Flanders)	78
Belgium Dance (Ultratop Flanders)	43
Belgium (Ultratop Wallonia)	65
Belgium Dance (Ultratop Wallonia)	17
France (SNEP)	156
Netherlands (Dance Top 30)	38
Netherlands (Dutch Top 40)	89
Russia Airplay (TopHit)	21
US Hot Dance/Electronic Songs (Billboard)	65

=== Certifications ===
Sale certifications for "Wizard"
Region	Certification	Certified units/sales
Sweden (GLF)	Gold	20,000^{‡}
United Kingdom (BPI)	Silver	200,000^{‡}
Streaming
Denmark (IFPI Danmark)	Gold	1,300,000^{†}
^{‡} Sales+streaming figures based on certification alone.^{†} Streaming-only figures based on certification alone.

== Release history ==
Region	Date	Format	Label
Netherlands	2 December 2013	Digital download	Spinnin'
Germany; Austria; Switzerland	14 February 2014	Digital download	Spinnin'
United Kingdom	23 March 2014	Digital download	Spinnin'
