= Jay Hardway =

Dutch DJ and record producer (born 1991)

- Born: Jobke Pieter Hendrik Heiblom; 27 April 1991 (age 35); Drunen, North Brabant, Netherlands
- Genres: Electro house; progressive house; Dutch house; microhouse; big room house
- Occupations: DJ; record producer
- Years active: 2007–present
- Labels: Spinnin'; Armada; Stmpd; Revealed; Musical Freedom
- Website: jayhardway.com

Jobke Pieter Hendrik Heiblom (born 27 April 1991), known professionally as Jay Hardway (stylised as JΔY HΔRDWΔY), is a Dutch DJ and record producer from Drunen, North Brabant. He is signed to Spinnin' Records. He is best known for his collaboration "Wizard" in conjunction with his fellow Dutch artist Martin Garrix. The 2013 single became an international hit charting in Belgium, France and the Netherlands.

== Career ==
=== 2012–present: Breakthrough and singles ===
Hardway's first collaboration with Martin Garrix "Registration Code" was released in 2012 as a free download through SoundCloud. In March 2013, the two released the single "Error 404" through Doorn Records. In December 2013, Hardway and Garrix released the single "Wizard" through Spinnin' Records, which became one of their most successful collaborations to date. The song peaked at number 16 on the Dutch Singles Chart and number 7 on the UK Singles Chart. Hardway released his first solo single "Bootcamp" on 31 May 2014. His song "Freedom" with Mike Hawkins was later released in August of the same year. Later on 13 November 2015, he released "Electric Elephants" on Spinnin' Records. On 17 October 2016, he collaborated with fellow Dutch DJ Martin Garrix on "Spotless".

== Discography ==
=== Singles ===
List of singles as lead artist, with selected chart positions, showing year released and album name
| Title | Year | Peak chart positions | | | | | | | | Certifications | Album |
| Title | Year | NLD | AUT | BEL | FRA | GER | SWE | SWI | UK | Certifications | Album |
|---|---|---|---|---|---|---|---|---|---|---|---|
| "Check Down" | 2011 | — | — | — | — | — | — | — | — | | Non-album singles |
| "Registration Code" (with Martin Garrix) | 2012 | — | — | — | — | — | — | — | — | | Non-album singles |
| "Error 404" (with Martin Garrix) | 2013 | — | — | — | — | — | — | — | — | | Non-album singles |
| "Wizard" (with Martin Garrix) | 2013 | 16 | 34 | 6 | 31 | 30 | 21 | 29 | 7 | GLF: Gold | Gold Skies |
| "Bootcamp" | 2014 | — | — | 75 | — | — | — | — | — | | Non-album singles |
| "Freedom" (with Mike Hawkins) | 2014 | — | — | — | — | — | — | — | — | | Non-album singles |
| "Voodoo" (with DVBBS) | 2015 | — | — | — | — | — | — | — | — | | Non-album singles |
| "Wake Up" | 2015 | — | — | — | — | — | — | — | — | | Non-album singles |
| "Electric Elephants" | 2015 | — | — | 76 | — | — | — | — | — | | Non-album singles |
| "Home" (with Firebeatz) | 2015 | — | — | — | — | — | — | — | — | | Non-album singles |
| "Stardust" | 2016 | — | — | — | — | — | — | — | — | | Non-album singles |
| "El Mariachi" (with Bassjackers) | 2016 | — | — | — | — | — | — | — | — | | Non-album singles |
| "Dinosaur" (with Bassjackers) | 2016 | — | — | — | — | — | — | — | — | | Non-album singles |
| "Somnia" | 2016 | — | — | — | — | — | — | — | — | | Non-album singles |
| "Spotless" (with Martin Garrix) | 2016 | — | — | — | — | — | — | — | — | | Seven |
| "Amsterdam" | 2016 | — | — | — | — | — | — | — | — | | Non-album singles |
| "Scio" | 2017 | — | — | — | — | — | — | — | — | | Non-album singles |
| "Golden Pineapple" | 2017 | — | — | — | — | — | — | — | — | | Non-album singles |
| "Need It" | 2017 | — | — | — | — | — | — | — | — | | Non-album singles |
| "Thanks a Million" | 2017 | — | — | — | — | — | — | — | — | | Non-album singles |
| "Wired" (with MOTi featuring Babet) | 2017 | — | — | — | — | — | — | — | — | | Non-album singles |
| "Coffee Please" | 2018 | — | — | — | — | — | — | — | — | | Non-album singles |
| "Jigsaw" (with The Him) | 2018 | — | — | — | — | — | — | — | — | | Non-album singles |
| "Save Me" (with Mesto) | 2018 | — | — | — | — | — | — | — | — | | Non-album singles |
| "Solid" | 2018 | — | — | — | — | — | — | — | — | | Non-album singles |
| "Let Me Tell You Something" | 2018 | — | — | — | — | — | — | — | — | | Non-album singles |
| "EDM Bubble" (with Mike Cervello) | 2018 | — | — | — | — | — | — | — | — | | Non-album singles |
| "Paradigm" | 2018 | — | — | — | — | — | — | — | — | | Non-album singles |
| "Aliens" | 2019 | — | — | — | — | — | — | — | — | | Non-album singles |
| "Exhale" | 2019 | — | — | — | — | — | — | — | — | | Non-album singles |
| "Lost" | 2019 | — | — | — | — | — | — | — | — | | Non-album singles |
| "Vocal Chops" | 2019 | — | — | — | — | — | — | — | — | | Non-album singles |
| "Counting Sheep" | 2019 | — | — | — | — | — | — | — | — | | Non-album singles |
| "Wild Mind" (featuring Tiffany Blom) | 2019 | — | — | — | — | — | — | — | — | | Non-album singles |
| "Operation Unicorn" | 2020 | — | — | — | — | — | — | — | — | | Non-album singles |
| "Rollercoaster" | 2020 | — | — | — | — | — | — | — | — | | Non-album singles |
| "Vibes" | 2020 | — | — | — | — | — | — | — | — | | Non-album singles |
| "Run Baby Run" (with Tom & Jame and Jguar) | 2020 | — | — | — | — | — | — | — | — | | Non-album singles |
| "Put Em High" (with Robert Falcon featuring Therese) | 2020 | — | — | — | — | — | — | — | — | | Non-album singles |
| "It's Over" (featuring Juliette Claire and Aiden O'Brien) | 2020 | — | — | — | — | — | — | — | — | | Non-album singles |
| "Kingdoms" (with Tungevaag) | 2020 | — | — | — | — | — | — | — | — | | Non-album singles |
| "Running To You" (with Robert Falcon) | 2021 | — | — | — | — | — | — | — | — | | Non-album singles |
| "Bird Song" | 2021 | — | — | — | — | — | — | — | — | | Non-album singles |
| "In My Head" | 2021 | — | — | — | — | — | — | — | — | | Non-album singles |
| "Outer Space" | 2021 | — | — | — | — | — | — | — | — | | Non-album singles |
| "Million Reasons" (featuring Zophia) | 2021 | — | — | — | — | — | — | — | — | | Non-album singles |
| "Like No Other" (featuring Jaimes) | 2021 | — | — | — | — | — | — | — | — | | Non-album singles |
| "Till The Sun Comes Up" (featuring PolyAnna) | 2021 | — | — | — | — | — | — | — | — | | Non-album singles |
| "I Wanna" (with Retrovision) | 2022 | — | — | — | — | — | — | — | — | | Non-album singles |
| "My Sweet Heaven" (featuring Stealth) | 2022 | — | — | — | — | — | — | — | — | | Non-album singles |
| "No Good" (with Firebeatz) | 2022 | — | — | — | — | — | — | — | — | | Non-album singles |
| "Out Of My Mind" | 2022 | — | — | — | — | — | — | — | — | | Non-album singles |
| "Pieces" | 2022 | — | — | — | — | — | — | — | — | | Non-album singles |
"—" denotes a recording that did not chart.

=== Remixes ===
| Title | Year | Original Artist(s) | Label |
|---|---|---|---|
| "Hey DJ" | 2012 | The Opposites | TopNotch |
| "Wild Ones" | 2012 | Flo Rida (featuring Sia) | Jay Hardway |
| "I Feed You My Love" | 2012 | Margaret Berger | Polydor |
| "D.I.Z.Z.Y" | 2013 | Dr. Papasov | Twisted Plastic |
| "The Drop" | 2014 | Lethal Bizzle | Polydor |
| "Mode" | 2016 | Bingo Players | Hysteria / Spinnin' Records |
| "Runaways" | 2016 | Sam Feldt and Deepend (featuring Teemu) | Spinnin' Records |
| "Over The Edge" | 2017 | Borgeous and tyDi (featuring Dia) | Geousus Records / Armada Music |
| "Sunny Days" | 2017 | Armin van Buuren (featuring Josh Cumbee) | Armada Music |
| "These Heights" | 2017 | Bassjackers and Lucas & Steve (featuring Caroline Pennel) | Spinnin Records |
| "How You Love Me" | 2019 | Hardwell (featuring Conor Maynard and Snoop Dogg) | Revealed Music / Spinnin Records |
| "Bad At Being Alone" | 2020 | Codeko | Musical Freedom / Spinnin Records |

== Awards and nominations ==
=== DJ Magazine top 100 DJs ===
| Year | Position | Notes | Ref. |
|---|---|---|---|
| 2016 | 89 | New Entry | |
| 2017 | 68 | —N/a | |
| 2018 | 64 | —N/a | |
| 2022 | 98 | Re-entry | |
| 2023 | 100 | —N/a | |
