= TooManyLeftHands =

Danish DJ and producer duo

- Origin: Denmark
- Genre: House / Tech / Progressive / Deep
- Years active: 2009–present
- Members: Anders K Martin Nick

TooManyLeftHands (TMLH) is a Copenhagen-based Danish DJ and producer duo consisting of Anders K and Martin Nick. Their work is mainly in the House, Tech, Progressive, and Deep genres.

Anders K is a successful Danish DJ who teamed up with club-owner, events organizer and producer Martin Nick for a duo releasing their own materials. The DJ duo named TooManyLeftHands debuted during the 2009 Copenhagen Fashion Week, gaining residency at the Nasa club, and in October 2010 won the producer contest for Ibiza Style Magazine, and later started hosting in cooperation with Ibiza Global Radio and Pioneer.

In addition to collaborations with a number of artists like Nadia Gattas, Mike Hawkins and Alexander Brown, in 2014, they released "Dancing in the Fire" and "Trouble" both charting in Denmark. They have also remixed materials from Danish artists Darwich, Svenstrup & Vendelboe, Morten Breum, Sisse Marie and Rune RK.

The single "Paralyzed", which was released in cooperation with Sisse Marie, was used in 2012 in the computer game The Sims 3.

== Discography ==
=== Singles ===
Year	Single	Peak positions
Year	Single	DEN
2014	"Dancing in the Fire"	31
2014	"Trouble"	25
2015	"Too Young to Die"	39

Other singles and collaborations

- 2010: "Make Me Dance" (2010)
- 2010: "Flowing Over" (feat. Clara Sofie)
- 2012: "Paralyzed" (feat. Sisse Marie)
- 2013: "Survivor" (feat. Nadia Gattas)
- 2013: "EDM CPH" (feat. Mike Hawkins & Alexander Brown)
- 2013: "Sommer"

Featured in

- 2012: "Good Morning Copenhagen" (Simon Gain feat. Jay Adams & TooManyLeftHands)
