= Gold Skies =

Single by Sander van Doorn, Martin Garrix and DVBBS featuring Aleesia

from the EP Gold Skies
- Released: 2 June 2014
- Recorded: 2014
- Length: 5:29 (original mix); 4:02 (radio edit)
- Label: Spinnin'
- Songwriters: Sander van Doorn; Martin Garrix; DVBBS; Aleesia
- Producers: van Doorn; Garrix; DVBBS; Aleesia

Sander van Doorn singles chronology
"Gold Skies" (2014)	"Oh Amazing Bass" (2015)

Martin Garrix singles chronology
"Tremor" (2014)	"Gold Skies" (2014)	"Proxy" (2014)

DVBBS singles chronology
"Immortal" (2014)	"Gold Skies" (2014)	"Pyramids" (2014)

"Gold Skies" is a song by Dutch DJ and record producer Sander van Doorn, Dutch DJ and record producer Martin Garrix and Canadian electronic music duo DVBBS, featuring vocals from Canadian singer Aleesia. It was released as a digital download on 2 June 2014 on Beatport and on 16 June 2014 on iTunes. The song has charted in Belgium. The song was produced by Sander Van Doorn, Martin Garrix, DVBBS and Aleesia.

== Music video ==
The music video to accompany the song "Gold Skies", was uploaded officially on YouTube on 17 May 2014.

The music video features a couple on a camping trip. The first scene features them fighting after the man dislikes the burgers that are cooked on a barbecue. Later, the man is filling their van with petrol but gets angry and runs away. The girl then finds the van and sets off to find the man, who is seen at a burger place in a town. When the girl finds the man, she tells him to get into the van again. It is unknown where their final destination is. The music video was filmed in Iceland, located in western Europe. Russian car UAZ-452 is seen on a music video

== Chart performance ==
=== Weekly charts ===
Chart (2014)	Peak position
Belgium (Ultratip Bubbling Under Flanders)	60
Belgium (Ultratip Bubbling Under Wallonia)	68
Canada Hot 100 (Billboard)	57
France (SNEP)	183
Netherlands (Dutch Top 40)	33
Netherlands (Single Top 100)	94
Poland Dance (ZPAV)	37
Scotland Singles (Official Charts)	19
UK Singles (Official Charts)	49
UK Dance (Official Charts)	12
US Hot Dance/Electronic Songs (Billboard)	19

=== Year-end charts ===
Chart (2014)	Position
US Hot Dance/Electronic Songs (Billboard)	69

== Release history ==
Region	Date	Format	Label	Ref.
Netherlands	16 June 2014	Digital download	Spinnin'	
