= Find You =

Find You may refer to:

- "Find You" (Zedd song), 2014
- "Find You" (Nick Jonas song), 2017
