= Hardwell =

Dutch DJ and record producer (born 1988)

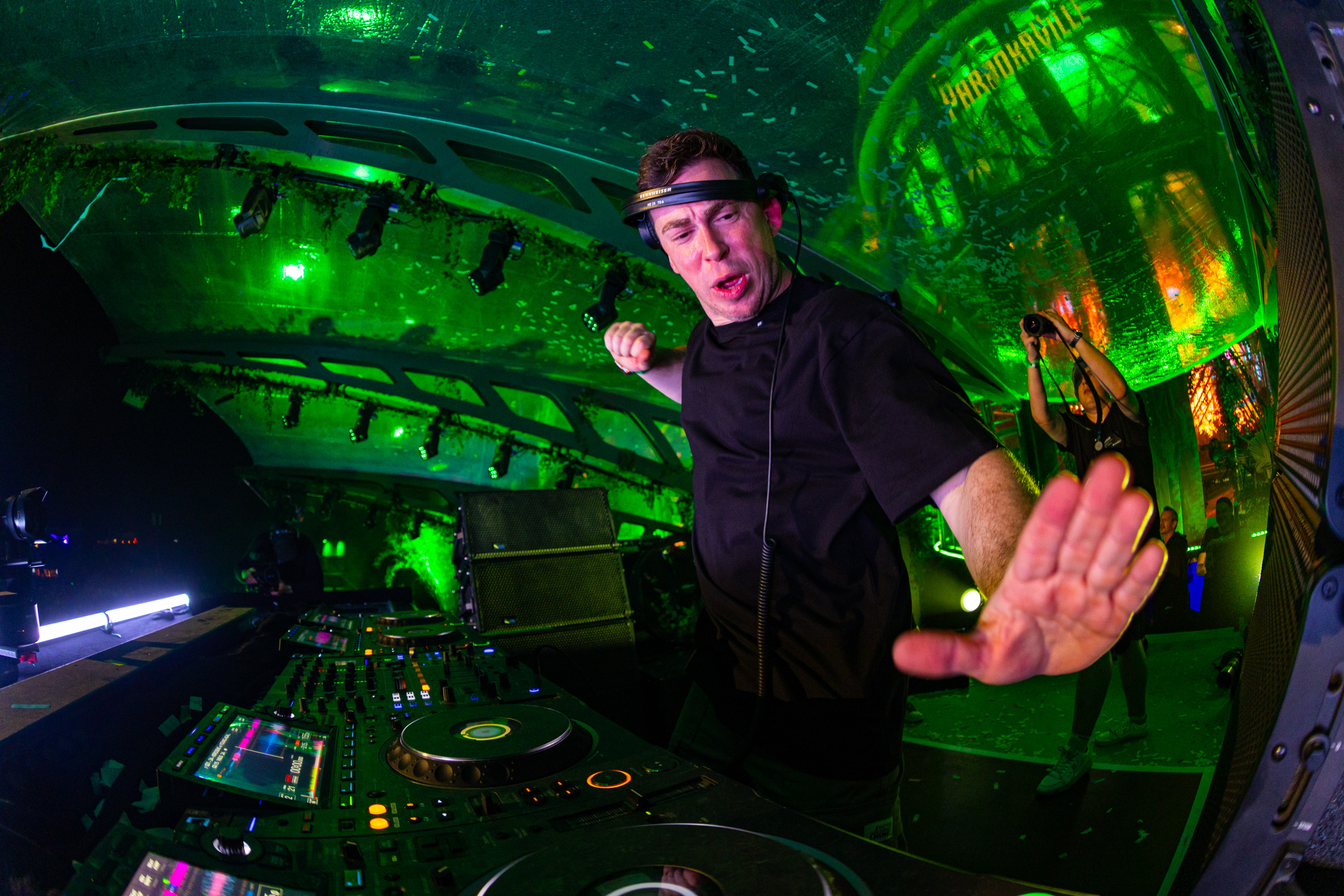
- DJ Hardwell performing at Parookaville 2024

Background information
- Born: Robbert van de Corput; 7 January 1988 (age 38); Breda, North Brabant, Netherlands
- Genres: EDM; big room house; techno; progressive house; Dutch house; electro house; hardstyle
- Occupations: DJ; record producer; remixer
- Years active: 2002–present
- Labels: Revealed; Musical Freedom; Ultra; Mainstage; Epic Amsterdam; Sony; Universal; Armada; Spinnin'
- Website: djhardwell.com

Robbert van de Corput (Dutch pronunciation: [ˈrɔbərt fɑn də ˈkɔrpʏt]; (Note: In isolation, van is pronounced [vɑn].) born 7 January 1988), known professionally as Hardwell, is a Dutch DJ and record producer. He was voted the world's number one DJ by DJ Mag in 2013 and again in 2014. In 2022, he was ranked at number 43 in the top 100 DJs poll by DJ Mag. He is best known for his sets at music festivals, including Ultra Music Festival, Sunburn and Tomorrowland.

He first gained recognition in 2009 for his bootleg of "Show Me Love vs. Be". He founded the record label Revealed Recordings in 2010 and a radio show and podcast Hardwell On Air in 2011. He has released 10 compilation albums through his label, as well as two documentary films. His debut studio album, United We Are, was released on 23 January 2015.

On 7 September 2018, he had announced his indefinite hiatus from touring, stating that he wanted to focus more on his personal life. On 27 March 2022, he returned to touring by closing out Ultra Miami's mainstage with his second album Rebels Never Die.

== Biography ==
=== Pseudonym ===
The pseudonym comes from an idea of his father, who translated his surname from Latin and Dutch into English, "cor" meaning "heart" in Latin and "put" meaning "well" in Dutch. However, he changed the "heart" to "hard", to make it sound more appealing.

=== Early life and musical beginnings ===
Robbert van de Corput was born in Breda, to Anneke and Cor van de Corput. At the age of six, he began taking piano lessons and attended a music school. At the age of twelve, he produced his first songs in the field of electro, while performing as a hip-hop DJ.

Through his participation in various competitions, he became known in Breda's DJ scene. He was influenced by the DJ and producer Tiësto, who is also from Breda.

As hip-hop became an underground scene, Hardwell changed his genre to commercial electronic dance music. He started producing remixes and uploaded them on several platforms on the Internet. At the age of 14 in 2002, he was offered a record deal with the Digidance record label by Dutch producer duo Klubbheads. Three weeks later he made a first official release with the two-disc-record "Bubbling Beats 1", whereupon he toured through the Netherlands and appeared in a number of dance clubs. His first official single, "Play It Around", was released in 2006, and was played in German clubs. The single featured a combination of popular musical genres, as well as his own style.

=== 2007–2010: Musical breakthrough and launch of Revealed Recordings ===
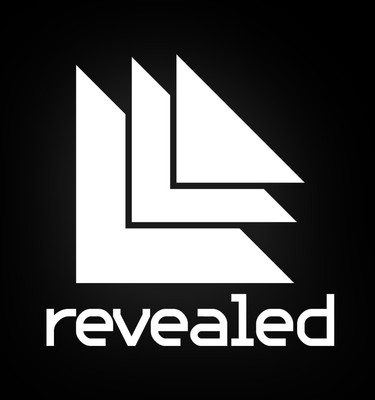
The logo for Hardwell's record label, Revealed Recordings

At the end of 2007 Hardwell released the song "Never Knew Love", which was produced as a collaboration with Greatski; the song placed on the official German single-charts. Remixes for Gregor Salto's and Chuckie's "Toys Are" together with Dutch DJ and producer R3hab as well as a mix of "You Do Not Love Me" by Sidney Samson and Skitzofrenix in 2008 remained at the top of the dance charts for weeks. Also in 2008, he produced a mash-up of the tracks "Be" by Steve Angello and Laidback Luke, and "Show Me Love" by Robin S.

Hardwell's bootleg with the title "Show Me Love" was played by many DJs and was praised by Laidback Luke and Steve Angello. In December 2008 the two producers released the track as an official cover version of "Show Me Love". A new remix by Hardwell was contained on the single.

In 2010 Hardwell founded his own record label, Revealed Recordings, or just Revealed, for the purpose of releasing electronic dance music by young talents. He contracted with EDM artists, including the duo W&W as well as his personal friends Dannic and Dyro. Each year, Revealed releases a compilation called "Hardwell Presents Revealed", containing tracks released by the label together with Hardwell's own new songs. On the fifth anniversary, a sampler was released containing the 100 most popular tracks, chosen by a vote through Revealed's website. The top three were "Spaceman" by Hardwell, "Burn" by KSHMR and DallasK, and "Left Behind" by Paris Blohm and Taylr Renee.

=== 2011–2012: Hardwell On Air and Spaceman ===
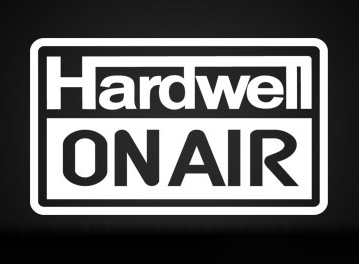
The logo for Hardwell On Air, a podcast he runs weekly

In 2011, he signed a record deal with the German record label Kontor Records, giving his releases wider distribution. In March 2011, Hardwell launched his own podcast, Hardwell On Air, a one-hour selection of songs by various artists. The podcast is broadcast by a number of radio stations, including Slam! in the Netherlands as well as SiriusXM in the United States.

That same year, Hardwell collaborated with Tiësto to produce the track "Zero 76", named for the telephone prefix "076" of their hometown Breda. Hardwell's successor single "Cobra" appeared on the Dutch single charts. The track was used as a theme song for the Energy festival and reached position 1 of the Beatport charts. "Encoded" followed with a similar success and was used as the intro song for his podcast.

In 2011, Hardwell was ranked in the Top 100 DJs category by DJ Mag for the first time and jumped on number 24 as the second-highest new entry behind Skrillex. At the International Dance Music Awards 2012, he won the Best Break-Through DJ award.

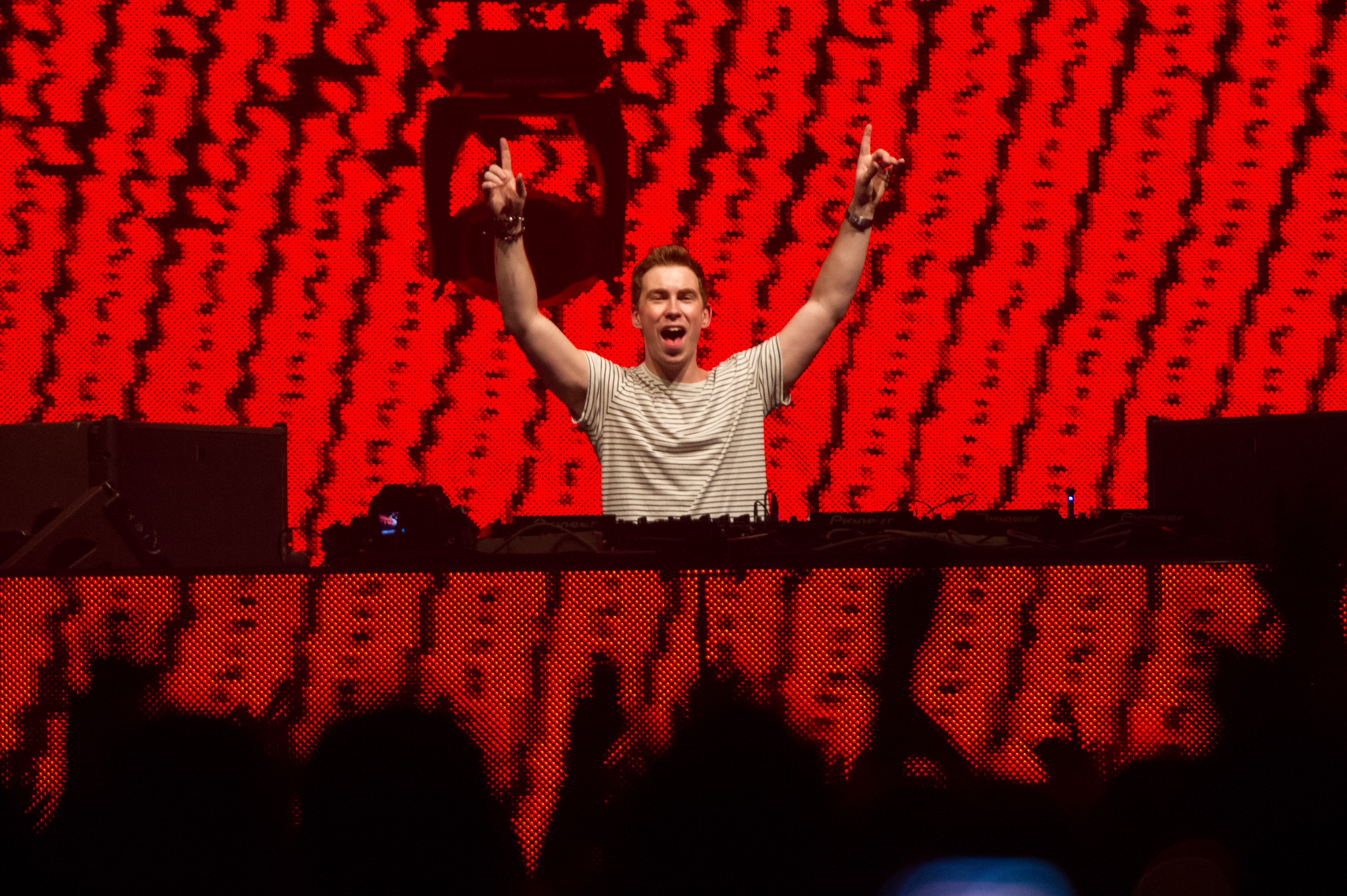
Hardwell at Summer Sound Festival 2012

On 31 July 2012, the track "Spaceman" was released. It sold over half a million times in the US and was played extensively in clubs and festivals in 2012. It is said to be a song that further popularized the big room house genre. A vocal version with Mitch Crown would chart in the Dutch Single Top 100 and US Billboard Hot Dance/Electronic Songs. In the following years, several remixes of the song were published, as well as a mash-up with a hardstyle remix of Blasterjaxx and W&W's "Rocket" by Hardwell, which he often used for sets as an outro song.

Hardwell appeared as a headliner at several festivals, including Creamfields, Electric Zoo Festival, Electric Daisy Carnival, Ultra Music Festival, and Nature One. He also performed at Tomorrowland 2012, and released a related video which received tens of millions of views. In the fall of 2012 Hardwell reached the sixth place in the ranking list DJ Mag Top 100.

=== 2013: Opening of the I Am Hardwell Tour ===
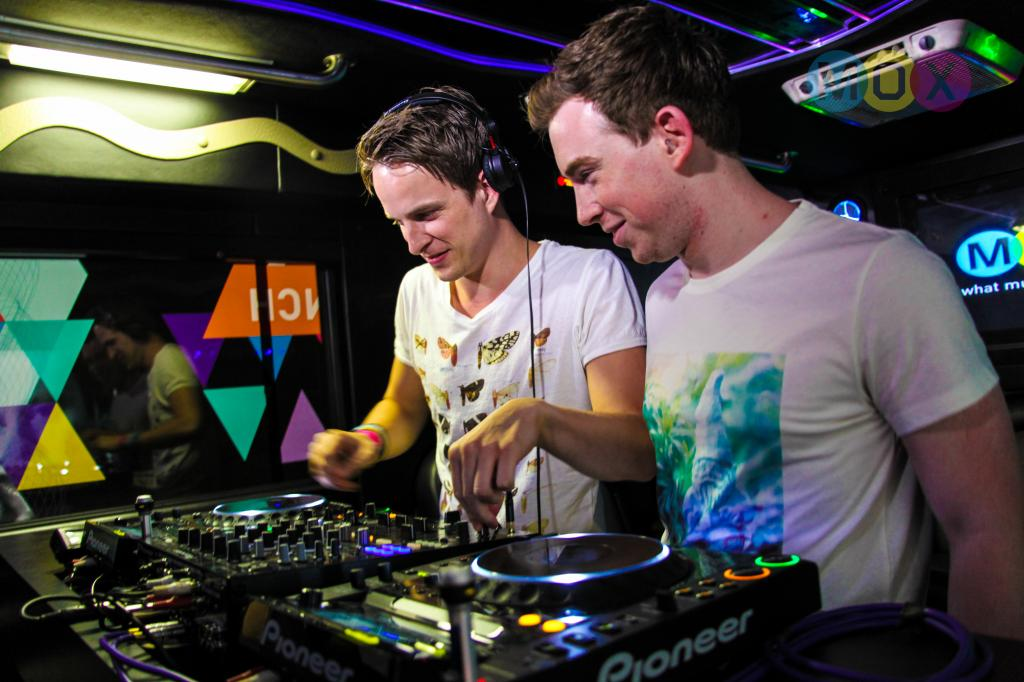
Hardwell and Dannic during the MOX Revealed Bus Party 2013

On 29 January 2013, Hardwell started a bus tour through Canada, together with his colleagues Dannic and Dyro. This was done in connection with Revealed Recordings and gave the trio the name "Dutch House Mafia". Dyro and Dannic also accompanied Hardwell on his North America tour in summer 2013.

The single "Apollo", released on 1 February 2013, reached the charts of many European countries, including Austria, Belgium, France and the Netherlands. The singer of the song is Amba Shepherd. Shortly after, the song "Never Say Goodbye", displaying a similar style, was released. Hardwell recorded the song with his friend Dyro and the American singer Heather Bright a.k.a. Bright Lights. In April 2013, he launched his first worldwide tour entitled "I Am Hardwell." That year he performed on the main stage at the Ultra Music Festival, toppling his Tomorrowland Liveset from the previous year from the first place of the most viewed live-DJ-sets with over 80,000 viewers.

In the summer of 2013 he also appeared as headliner at Tomorrowland. Later in the summer, the single "Jumper" appeared in collaboration with the DJ duo W&W. It represents the biggest club-hit of the whole year together with Martin Garrix' "Animals" and DVBBS' "Tsunami". Hardwell also adapted his style of the growing big-room house fan base with "Countdown", which was a collaboration with American DJ MAKJ. With "Countdown", he reached the German single-charts once again. With the American singer Matthew Koma, he released the track "Dare You" at the end of 2013, which followed the success of "Apollo".

=== 2014: I Am Hardwell documentary ===
In January 2014, the documentary I Am Hardwell which tells the story of his career and documents his most successful moments. For the documentary, he was accompanied by the director, Robin Piree for two and a half years. His life's motto is "If you can dream it, you can do it" referring to when he was 16 years old and dreamed of being the number 1 DJ in the world. A soundtrack of the film was released separately.

As the first result of his work, the track "Eclipse", which opened most of his live sets since November 2013, came up. Among fans, the ID track received the unofficial title "Titan", with the demands for its publication a running gag among his fans. In an interview with DJ Mag, Hardwell promised to release his album in 2014. Many tracks from the new album were introduced by Hardwell at Ultra Music Festival 2014 as well as Tomorrowland.

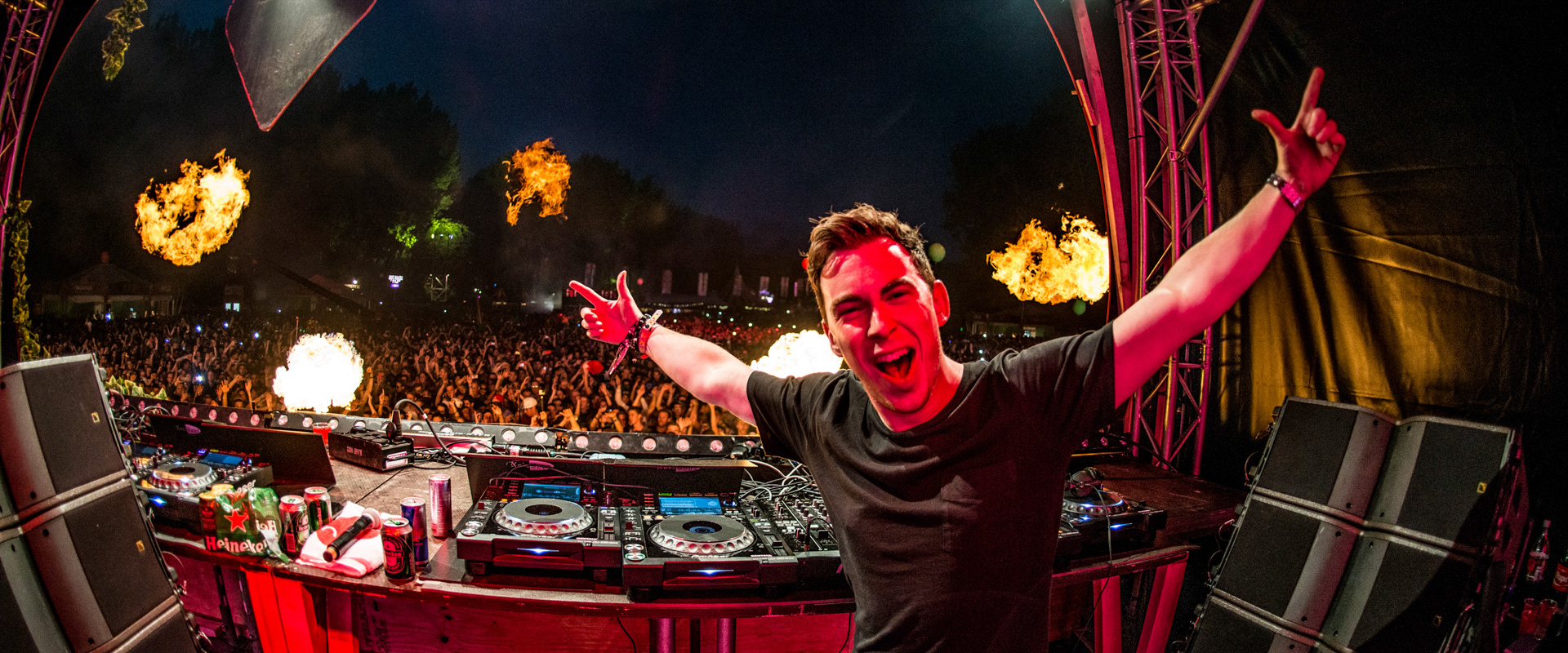
Hardwell live at Mysteryland, 2014

Hardwell and Tiësto performed a back to-back set at Tomorrowland 2014, which had more than 6 million views on YouTube as of January 2021, and announced their latest collaboration. One track featured Matthew Koma's vocals. Hardwell then devoted himself to completing his album.

In September 2014 the release of his studio album was postponed to the beginning of 2015. At the same time, the third official single release came out of the album, "Young Again", which contains vocals from British singer Chris Jones. The song was produced similar to "Dare You", not basing on big room style, but basing on a melodious progressive house drop. As with "Dare You", the single missed the entry to the German single-charts, despite high downloads chart placements.

In November 2014, Hardwell presented the single "Don't Stop the Madness" with W&W and American rapper Fatman Scoop as the third single release of his album.

In December 2014 Hardwell announced the official track list and cover of the then-upcoming album, which featured collaborations with producers like Tiësto and Headhunterz as well as singers like Andreas Moe and Mr. Probz. The announcement also included previews of some of the songs, including the track "Follow Me", which was recorded in collaboration with R&B singer Jason Derulo. At the same time, he announced his second world tour called "I Am Hardwell – United We Are". At the end of the year 2014, a minimix of the album unintentionally succeeded in the Internet and was virally distributed within minutes. In January 2015 the instrumental song "Eclipse" was released as a download single.

=== 2015: United We Are ===
Already prior to the release of the album, his podcast Hardwell On Air celebrated its 200th episode which made new animations being introduced in the video releases. Number 201 of the podcast had the subtitle "United We Are" on it and was a pure presentation of all the tracks of his album.

On 23 January 2015 "United We Are" was released worldwide. The single "Sally" was released one week before on 16 January 2015, said to be a combination of rock and big-room. The track was recorded with the British singer-songwriter Harrison Shaw and is Hardwell's first song to enter the German single charts. As a thanks for the support of his album and the celebration of two million followers on Twitter, Hardwell uploaded a video of the first two hours of the kickoff event to his new tour at the Ziggo Dome in Amsterdam on 24 January 2015, with the final hour being released on 26 August 2019. At the end of April in 2015, the single "Echo", sung by singer-songwriter Jonathan Mendelsohn, followed. Both the trance song and the music video received positive criticism.

On the "Ultra Music Festival" 2015 Hardwell presented numerous other unpublished songs like "Mad World" with the Overijssel-based singer Jake Reese, "Survivors" with Dannic and Haris Alagic, and "Off the Hook" with Armin Van Buuren, as well as numerous tracks from artists who were signed to his label. In addition, there were performances at Tomorrowland Brazil and Tomorrowland. Together with DJs like Dannic, Dyro, W&W, Kill the Buzz, Headhunterz, and Julian Calor, he hosted his own "Revealed" stage, named after his record label. In September 2015, there was also a performance at the TomorrowWorld festival in the USA.

In July 2015, the sixth episode of his Revealed-Presents compilation was released in parallel with "Survivors", which, similar to its predecessors, gained great success. In addition, the W&W remix of his song "Birds Fly" and his upcoming single "Chameleon" was presented for the first time. "Chameleon", a Jungle Terror collaboration with Dutch producer Wiwek followed one week later as a single. Two months later, the release of his Armin van Buuren collaboration "Off the Hook" followed. The old-school touch was praised and the song was also described as very special. Just some weeks later "Mad World", which was expected since May 2015, was released and features vocals by Jake Reese. However, the melody of Leadsound contains a melody-sample of the song "Smile with Your Eyes" by the musician Yeck Mar.

In October 2015 he lost his top position of the DJ Mag Top 100 to the Belgian brothers Dimitri Vegas & Like Mike. A series of criticism from fans followed, mostly due to accusations of the duo's promotional campaigns for votes.

During the Amsterdam Dance Event (ADE) in October 2015 Hardwell's second documentary "I Am Hardwell – Living The Dream", directed by Robin Piree, was premiered. Two days later, on 13 October 2015, the film went on in cinemas. On 7 November 2015 Hardwell presented the biggest DJ-solo show in Germany, held in collaboration with the "BigCityBeats World Club Dome". It took place in Arena AufSchalke in front of a record crowd of about 40,000 attendees. The normal tickets for this concert were sold out within three days.

A remix version of his studio album "United We Are" was released in December 2015. It contained the original tracklist, but all songs were remixed by different artists, including W&W, Vicetone and Frontliner. The entire tracklist was presented in episode 244 of his Hardwell on Air podcast. In parallel he and Armin van Buuren each presented an action figure; this caused moderate criticism, because of the high price.

On 13 December 2015, Hardwell organized a free concert entitled "The Biggest Guestlist" in Mumbai. With this performance, he earned a world record of the same name. In addition, he donated all the proceeds of the festival as well as the ones from the fans to the Magic Bus Charity Project, which enables children from poor backgrounds to achieve better education in cooperation with the "United We Are Foundation" and "Guestlistevents in".

=== 2016: Final I Am Hardwell performance and movement to hardstyle ===
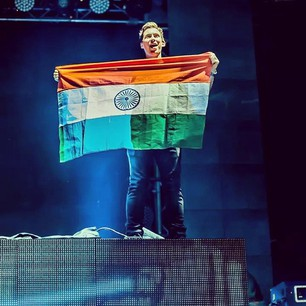
Hardwell at the "Biggest Guestlist" concert in India

On 8 January 2016, the song Perfect World by the Dutch singer Maan de Steenwinkel appeared. It was released as part of the casting show The Voice of Holland, whose sixth season she won. The title was produced by Hardwell. The song went up to 31st place in the Dutch single charts. He commented on the cooperation:

I've met Maan 3 weeks ago as I also followed her performances on 'The Voice Of Holland' from the beginning. I think she is a great talent and I know for sure that she will have a successful career in the music industry. She has my full support and I'm proud to be the producer of her first single 'Perfect World'

— Hardwell

"Hollywood" with Afrojack appeared on 25 January 2016 and jumped directly to number one on the Beatport chart. The second single of the year was the second collaboration with Jake Reese titled "Run Wild", which found place on 29 February 2016. Just a month later on 29 March 2016, Hardwell published his Kura collaboration "Calavera". This track reached the first place on the Beatport charts again.

At the Ultra Music Festival in 2016, he premiered the final version of his W&W collaboration. The initial version was premiered in 2013 and contained vocals by Harrison, but the producers who aren't satisfied with that release decided to incorporate a new version with Crunk-vocals of US rapper Lil Jon. In addition, Hardwell played his next release, "8Fifty", in collaboration with his Revealed colleague Thomas Newson.

On 20 May 2016, his hardstyle remix of The Chainsmokers' and Daya's "Don't Let Me Down", which was produced in collaboration with Sephyx, was released as a remix-single.

On 24 June 2016, Hardwell released the 7th of his Revealed compilations. In the release appeared the studio versions of his solo hardstyle debut "Wake Up Call" and the title "Going Crazy". "Wake Up Call" continued to be released on 3 August 2016 as a free download. On 29 August 2016, Hardwell released "Going Crazy" on Beatport, marking his second collaboration with Blasterjaxx.

Hardwell's collaboration with Craig David called "No Holding Back" was released on 19 August 2016, which contained elements of UK Garage and deep house.

In his performance at the BigCityBeats World Club Dome, Hardwell announced that his last show of the "I Am Hardwell – United We Are" world tour would be taking place on 27 August, at Hockenheimring in Baden-Württemberg, Germany. Together with Big City Beats, the largest lighting installation in Germany was built, with it the light show and the design of the mainstage were described as breathtaking. As warm-up acts, Funkerman, Kill The Buzz and Dannic played from 5:00 to 08:30 pm. Hardwell played for 3 1/2 hours in contrast to his previous 2-hour-long shows. As guests, he brought singer Haris on stage for his upcoming single "What We Need" as well as hardstyle DJ Atmozfears for their collaboration. In spite of temperatures of more than 35 °C, free water was renounced which led to criticism by attendees.

On 13 October 2016, single "Thinking About You" was released together with singer Jay Sean. The single contained elements of pop and R&B, and was highly received on download charts. Together with Revealed colleague Kaaze, Hardwell produced a progressive house festival mix of "Thinking About You" at the end of October 2016. Hardwell's "Get Down" together with W&W was premiered a few weeks later on Hardwell on Air, and was released on 18 November 2016.

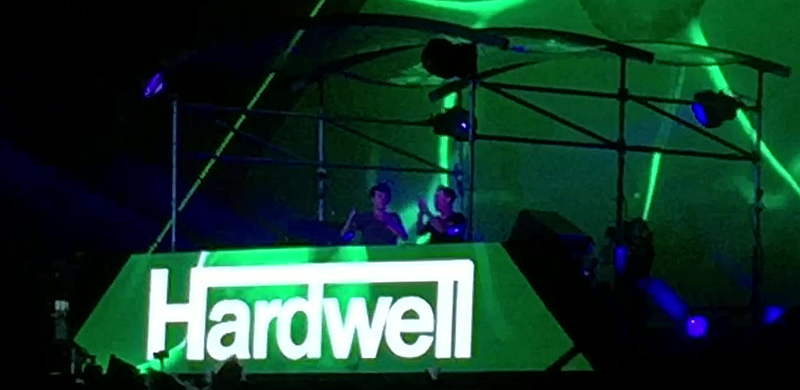
Hardwell live with Atmozfears at the final concert of his tour at Hockenheimring 2016

In the DJ-Mag placements, Hardwell fell down the rankings from his previous year position, this time ranking third. In addition, Martin Garrix reached the top, with which he got the rank as the youngest number one. In the course of the controversy surrounding the 2016 DJ Mag awards, he held a statement at his ADE-performance on 21 October 2016, where he challenged the guidelines of the rankings. He explained using Atmozfears as an example that production talent would not be taken into account, as Atmozfears had exceptional production skills but failed to receive a list placing.

On 12 December 2016, Hardwell released "Baldadig", which was produced in collaboration with Quintino. Shortly thereafter, a reworked version of the song "Crank" from Jewelz & Sparks appeared on Revealed Recordings, produced by Hardwell under his pseudonym "HWL".

=== 2017 ===
==== Early 2017: Reformation of the label and UMF performance ====
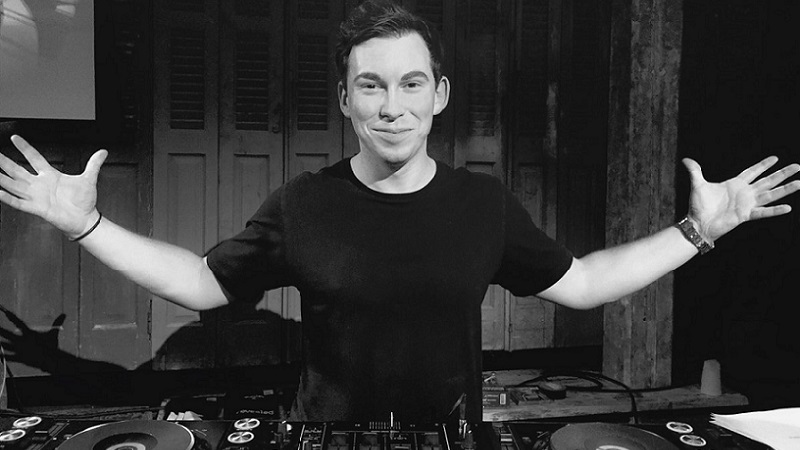
Hardwell on the 300th episode of his Hardwell on Air podcast

On 2 January 2017, Hardwell released the song "Break the House Down", which was produced together with Kill The Buzz in December 2015. This was the first publication in the new Revealed design. For his 29th birthday on 7 January 2017, Hardwell released "Party till the Daylight" as a birthday gift for free, which marks his entry into bass house. He also announced that the 300th episode of his "Hardwell-on-Air" on 20 January 2017 would be a special episode. Guest appearances were done by Blasterjaxx, Wiwek, Jay Hardway, Don Diablo, Suyano, and Kill The Buzz.

From 2 to 3 February 2017, Hardwell made a reworked version of the song "Spaceman" available as a free download for its 5-year anniversary, which included vocals by singer Heather Bright. In the year 2012, Hardwell organised a competition for a vocalised version of the song after the instrumental version was released, where at that time Bright sent her winning version to Hardwell. His management however, settled on Mitch Crown's "Call Me A Spaceman". Since 2015, the common version was available as a free track from Bright's site.

On 10 February 2017, the song "Go Down Low" by Badd Dimes was premiered on the 300th "Hardwell on Air" episode, and released as an edit by Hardwell on the same day. At the Ultra Music Festival on 25 March 2017, Hardwell premiered new productions with Austin Mahone, Maddix, Moksi and Henry Fong.

On 12 May 2017 Hardwell released his single "Creatures Of The Night" featuring Austin Mahone. This track did not represent his typical big room style, but more of the future bass style which was very popular in 2017. In his home country, the song entered the official single charts.

==== Mid-2017: Hardwell & Friends EPs ====
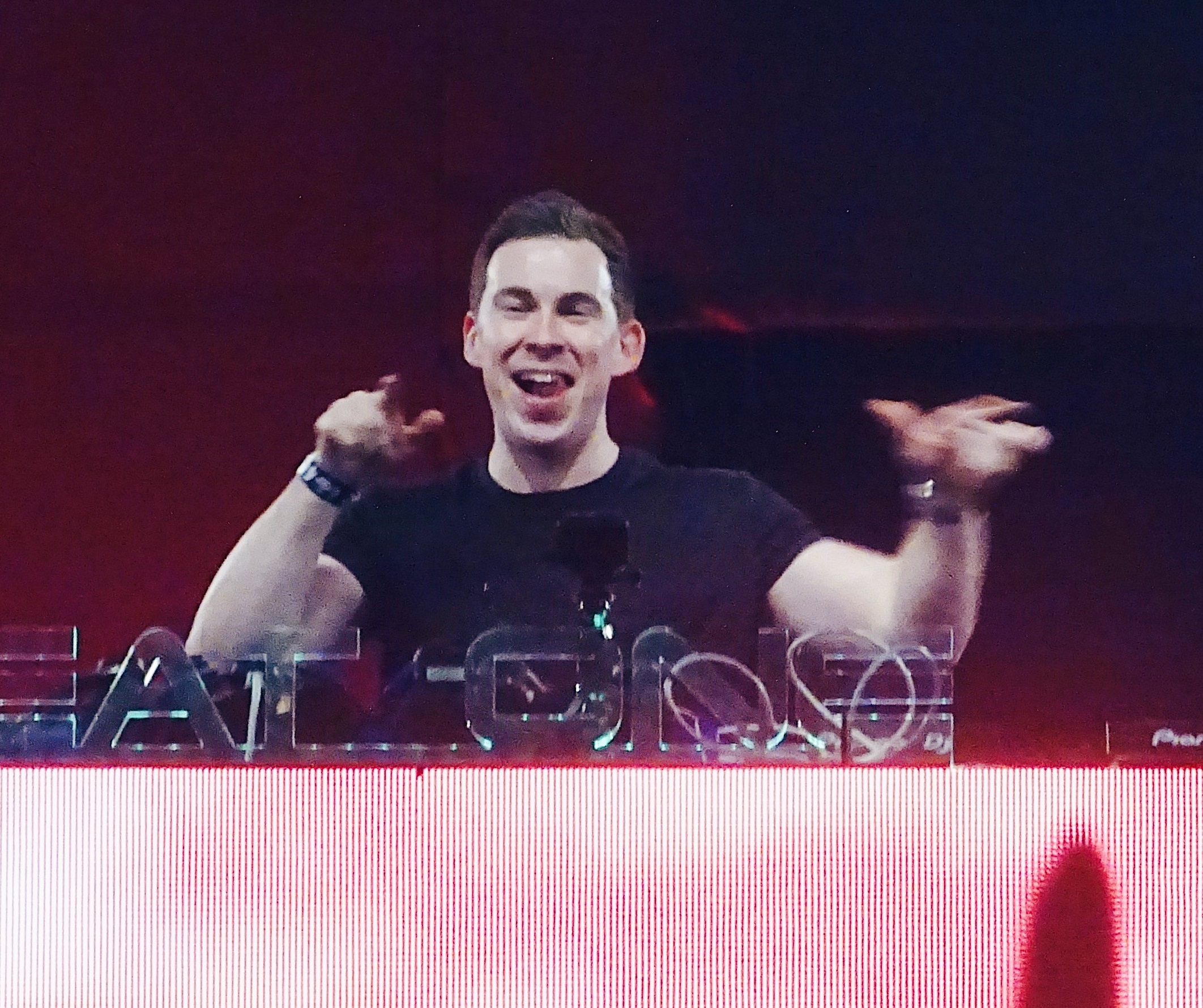
Hardwell live at Airbeat One Festival 2017

On 20 June 2017, Hardwell released the first version of the song "We Are One" on Taiwanese record label Eternal Music. This version was done for the Asian market and features vocals of Taiwanese singer Jolin Tsai.

At the end of June 2017, a track by Hardwell could be heard during the so-called "Endshow" of the Saturday of the Defqon.1 festival. The footage that was used in the video revealed the official name as "Make The World Ours", and the track will subsequently confirmed by Hardwell on Twitter. This song was classified as hardstyle and received very positive feedback. Two days later, on 30 June 2017, Hardwell published it officially on his own record label. It was speculated beforehand that the track would be released on "Q-Dance".

For mid-2017, Hardwell premiered a collaboration with the Dutch DJ duo Sick Individuals, who had been working with his record label for years. He also played a second collaboration with Afrojack, which had previously been rumored to be an Afrojack and KIIDA production. The song was completed after Hardwell's private jet had to make an emergency landing and Afrojack took him to his plane.

In the 326th episode of his Hardwell on Air podcast, published on 21 July 2017, he announced that the first volume of his Hardwell & Friends EP would be released on upcoming Friday. Until then, he wanted to release the songs as singles day by day. The song "We Are Legends", which was produced in collaboration with Kaaze and Jonathan Mendelsohn, represented the beginning of that project on 24 July 2017. On 25 July there appeared the official "Revealed" version of his track "We Are One". This version did not include Jolin Tsai's vocals, but instead of that of Alexander Tidebrink. "Police (You Ain't Ready)" with Kura was released the next day, a track which represents a crossover of genres reggae, big room, hardstyle, and trap. Also named on the single was reggae artist Anthony B, whose vocals were part of a sample, and was used in the break. The releasing series continued on the following day by the track "All That We Are Living For". The release of "Smash This Beat" ended the week.

Hardwell recorded the track "Badam" with DJ Henry Fong and vocalist Mr. Vegas, released on 21 August 2017. The next track was an official collaboration with Kill the Buzz, after multiple collaborations on the tracks "Don't Give Up" and "Break the House Down". Titled as "Still the One", the song was released on 22 August 2017. "What We Need", which was premiered at Queens Domain in early 2015, was released on 23 August 2017. Beside a bass house track with Moksi titled "Powermove", a collaboration with Dr Phunk was also part of the EP titled "Here Once Again".

==== Late 2017: Power with Kshmr ====
On 22 September 2017 Hardwell and Kshmr released their collaboration track "Power", which premiered in April 2017 and was published on KSHMR's Spinnin' Records sublabel Dharma Worldwide. This track represents Hardwell's first release on Spinnin' since "Zero 76" with Tiësto was released on the label back in 2011. After the release was announced in late August 2017, Hardwell premiered the studio version on 1 September 2017 in his Hardwell On Air podcast.

On 6 October 2017 Hardwell published his third collaboration with Afrojack, titled "Hands Up". Like the predecessor "Hollywood", the track is based on a classic "dirty Dutch" style. Another part of the track is Afrojack's live show supporter MC Ambush. In contrast to the two previous collaborations, the song was released on Afrojack's record label Wall Recordings.

After the official announcement of the eighth volume of his Hardwell presents Revealed series via Instagram-Story at the beginning of September 2017, the volume was released on 13 October 2017. In addition to the songs of his two Hardwell & Friends EPs, it also contains the intro of his 2017 live shows, "Who's in the House", as well as the unpublished track "The Universe".

Also on Instagram, Hardwell announced on 2 October 2017 a new cologne by him called ECLIPSE, named after the first track of his studio album. The fragrance was made available on 20 October 2017 with the motto "The New Sound in Fragrance".

During the Amsterdam Music Festival on 21 October 2017, which included the release of this year's DJ Mag Top 100 list, he first played a back-to-back live set with Armin van Buuren, which was previously announced as "Two is One". They gave a foretaste of their collaboration appearance in August 2017 with their 15-minute surprise performance at Dam Square in Amsterdam. Hardwell moved down to fourth place in the Top 100; van Buuren took third place.

On 3 November 2017, Hardwell and Quintino released a remix of "Mi Gente" by J Balvin and Willy William. The track features elements from his previous track with Quintino, "Baldadig".

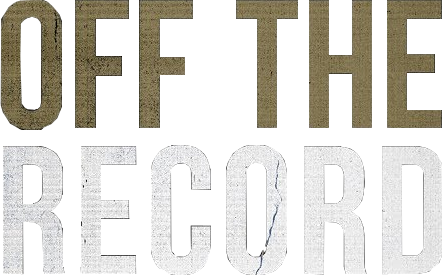
Hardwell On Air: Off the Record

==== World's Biggest Guestlist Festival 2017 ====
On Sunday 3 December 2017 global electronic pioneer and philanthropic figure Hardwell returned to Mumbai to once again partner with India's Guestlist4Good Social Enterprise and Mumbai based NGO Magic Bus for the 'World's Biggest Guestlist Festival' in association with his United We Are Foundation. Two years on from his previous visit to India, where Hardwell and partners provided education for over 18,000 young underprivileged children living in India. This 2017 aid event succeeded in drawing a capacity crowd of close to 75,000 people at the D.Y. Patil Stadium and securing enough donations by fans and sponsors alike to bring a brighter future through education to more than 100,000 young children.

=== 2018: Hardwell & Friends EP Vol. 3, Gemstone Records, singles and touring break ===
In January 2018, Hardwell premiered the EP Hardwell & Friends in the 350th episode of "Hardwell On Air". He released "The Underground", a collaboration with Timmy Trumpet. The track was first premiered at Ultra Europe 2017. On 23 January 2018, he released "Woest", a collaboration with Quintino. On 24 January 2018, he released "Get Low", a collaboration with Sick Individuals. The track was also first premiered at Ultra Europe 2017. On 25 January 2018, he released "Safari", a collaboration with Jewelz & Sparks.

With the final release of "Take Us Down (Feeding Our Hunger)" with Dr. Phunk, the full EP was made available on 26 January 2018.

Hardwell released "Anthem" with American DJ Steve Aoki on 13 April 2018, which was the fourth release in Aoki's 5OKI artist collaboration campaign.

Hardwell announced on his Twitter account on 24 April 2018 that he has launched a new electronic pop sub-label titled "Gemstone Records", whose main goal is to promote new talent and reach a larger audience, while encompassing multiple genres such as deep house, future house, future bass and electro pop.

On 11 May 2018, Hardwell released "Earthquake". The track features vocals from Harrison, and was first premiered in the 350th episode of Hardwell on Air. On 25 May 2018, he collaborated with Netherlands-based jazz and pop orchestra Metropole Orkest to release an episodic two-part EP titled "Conquerors".

Later, Hardwell collaborated with Dutch producers Blasterjaxx and singer Mitch Crown to release "Bigroom Never Dies" on 13 July 2018, which was notably teased during his live performance on Dutch radio station Slam. The song incorporates elements of multiple genres other than its prevalent big room sound, including hardstyle, house, and techno. He collaborated with Kaaze again on "This Is Love", which was released on 31 August 2018 and featured vocals from Loren Allred who previously performed on The Voice.

On 7 September 2018, Hardwell announced via his Instagram page that he would be clearing his touring schedule indefinitely to take time off for his personal life. He promised that he will still continue to produce new music and will "never let it go". His last performance was at the Ziggo Dome for the Amsterdam Dance Event on 18 October 2018. The performance was closed with a speech where he stated: "Thank you so much, I will be back!". On 7 July 2019, Hardwell made his first comeback to the stage as a guest to Afrojack's Breda Live Show.

Hardwell continued to release a series of singles after his announcement: reggae-influenced Light It Up with Suyano and Richie Loop, Out Of This Town with Vinai and Cam Meekins, and Kicking It Hard. On 7 December 2018, he released electronic pop-influenced single How You Love Me with Snoop Dogg and Conor Maynard through Spinnin' Records.

=== 2019: "Being Alive", "I'm Not Sorry", "Left Right" with Deorro and Makj, and "Mr X" ===
On 4 January 2019, he released the track "Being Alive". The track features vocals from Jguar, and is a follow-up to his 2012 song "Apollo". On 7 February 2019, he released the track "Chase the Sun" with Dannic. The track features vocals from Kelli-Leigh. On 13 March 2019, he released the future house-influenced track "I'm Not Sorry" with Mike Williams. The track was first premiered at Amsterdam Dance Event 2018.

On 18 October 2019, he released the big room house track Left Right with Deorro and Makj featuring Fatman Scoop. Also in October 2019, during the Amsterdam Dance Event, Hardwell was rumoured to secretly play a DJ set during the event. A Reddit post alleged that a 'mysterious' Mr X played at Sunnery James & Ryan Marciano's event, much believed to be Hardwell. However Hardwell's manager, Anna Knaup, confirmed that Mr X was not Hardwell. In a statement, Knaup said, "I would like to officially confirm that whilst Robbert did make an appearance at Sunnery James & Ryan Marciano's ADE party, he was not there to perform but merely there to support his friends' event and to enjoy the night."

=== 2022: Return, Rebels Never Die ===
Leading up to Ultra Miami 2022, there were rumors that Hardwell was a special guest closing out the festival. On 27 March, Hardwell officially returned to the dance scene and closed out the festival with a new style of music, which has been described as future rave or future techno. At the same time, his website was rebooted with new tour dates for his forthcoming album titled Rebels Never Die. The following Friday, on 1 April, Hardwell released the first two singles of the album, titled "Broken Mirror" and "Into the Unknown". every other week in 2022 leading up to the release of the album, Hardwell would release one track off the album each. It ended on 13 September 2022, when his second album, Rebels Never Die, was released.

=== 2023: Six Doors, Hardwell On Air return, and singles ===
In 2023, Hardwell announced the Six Doors concept. Every few weeks, Hardwell would release a new collaboration as part of the Six Doors. The first door was a collaboration with Brazilian DJ VINNE, titled "Balança". The second door was Hardwell's first collaboration with Australian DJ Will Sparks, titled "Twisted". The third was one of many collaborations with Dutch DJ Quintino titled "Sloopkogel". The fourth was a collaboration with Maddix & Timmy Trumpet titled "Revolution", with vocals by Linnea Schossow. The fifth door was a two-track EP release called "The Seduction EP" with British DJ, Olly James. This EP included the tracks "Seduction" and "Flatline". The sixth and final door was a collaboration between Hardwell and Dutch Hardstyle duo Sub Zero Project titled "Judgement Day". During that time, Hardwell's official remix for "Miracle" by Calvin Harris and Ellie Goulding released.

Hardwell then released numerous singles such as "ACID", with Maddix and Luciana, "Anybody Out There" with Azteck and Alex Hepburn, "The Abyss" with French artist Space 92, a cover of "Human" by The Killers with Machine Made, his 2023 set intro titled "Shotgun (It Ain't Over)" with singer Bright Lights. He then released "I Wanna Dance" with Dutch DJ Nicky Romero, A rework of "Loneliness" with German DJ Tomcraft and Italian DJs DJs from Mars, his third collaboration with Afrojack titled "Push It", and ended the year with "Goes Like This", a collaboration with Australian producer Shortround.

In late 2023, Hardwell also brought back his weekly mix show, Hardwell On Air, changing it to be monthly instead of weekly. The show features unreleased remixes and bootlegs, as well as future Revealed releases.

=== 2024–present: Ultra Music Festival reschedule, Tulip naming ===
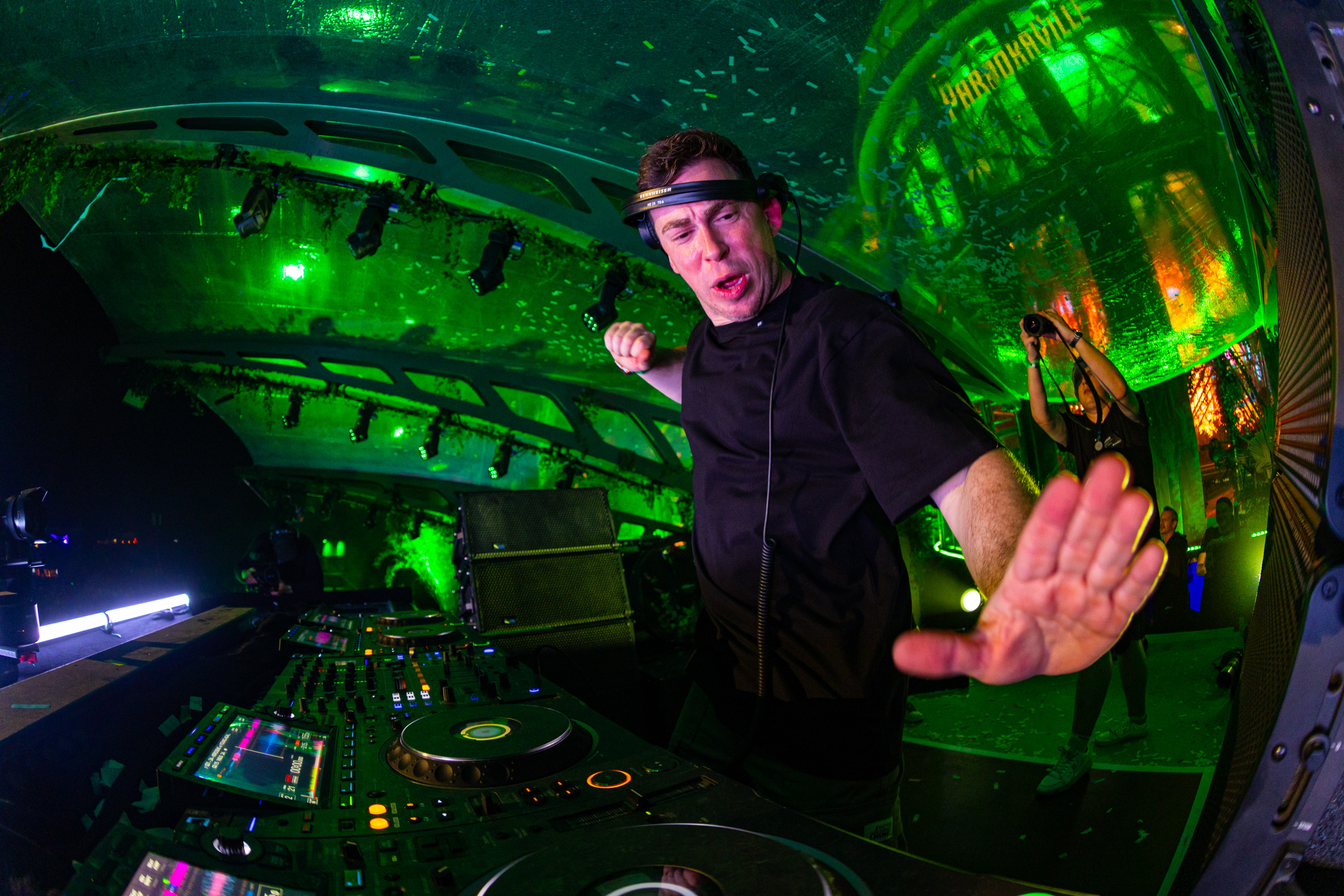
DJ Hardwell performing at Parookaville 2024

In 2024, during National Tulip Day, Hardwell had a Tulip named after him which he personally selected as was offered to him by Tulip Promotion Netherlands. The "Tulipa Hardwell" "has a red flower with a bright yellow edge and a strong stem with vibrant green leaves. The petals have a conspicuous fringe."

Hardwell released his Big room house track, "Oldskool Sound", and his track "Energy", which was his first collaboration with Dutch duo Bassjackers.

In March 2024, Hardwell was due to perform at Ultra Music Festival in Miami on the Friday night. However, heavy thunderstorms, flooding, and Tornado Warnings in Miami-Dade County prevented him from doing so, and Ultra was shut down for the night. Hardwell fans took to Twitter in ultimate support of the DJ, and on Saturday, he was then rescheduled to the 7:25 slot on the Ultra Mainstage, with Excision going on after Hardwell.

The week after Ultra, he released his cover of "16" by Ard Und Jorn, with Maddix and Blasterjaxx.

In June 2024, Hardwell played a Hardstyle DJ set in Breda in celebration for NAC Breda, the football club he has been a lifelong supporter of, securing promotion to the Eredivisie. The 30 minute set included Hardwell's own version of the club's official anthem "Hé, Hé, Hé, Hé, Hup NAC".

In 2025, Hardwell continued his international performances following his return to the global festival circuit. That same year, he was ranked No. 15 in DJ Mag's Top 100 DJs poll, reflecting his sustained presence in the electronic dance music scene.

== Musical style ==
Hardwell first gained fame for his EDM style, which brought him to the top of DJ Mag's polls in 2013 and 2014, then in the 2020s he re-invented himself as a big room techno DJ.

=== Equipment ===
By the year 2015 Hardwell still produced in his parents' house in Breda. On 20 January 2015, Hardwell first presented his current studio. It was designed by studio designer Jan Morel.

In his studio, he works with a Roland A-49 MIDI Keyboard Controller White, Crane Song Avocet Remote II, and Solid State Logic XLogic G-Series Compressor. reFX Nexus 2 And Sylenth 1 are his favourite plugins. On 11 March 2015 he published a soundset for the synthesizer software Sylenth1.

At his performances, Hardwell is mostly seen with Sennheiser HD25 II headphones. According to his technical rider, he works with a Pioneer DJM-800 Nexus or a DJM-900 Nexus mixer. In addition, his set-up contains four interconnected Pioneer CDJ-2000s.

== Merchandise ==
On 20 October 2017, Hardwell launched his own cologne brand "ECLIPSE" in Amsterdam, whose release was originally announced through his Twitter page on 2 October 2017.

== Personal life ==
From 2014 to 2016, he was in a relationship with the Dutch event manager Yanicke Agnes, whom he met in a bar in his hometown of Breda in 2013.

=== Controversies ===
On 6 July 2024, Hardwell canceled his set at SAGA Festival and addressed the crowd and announced equipment failures over the microphone. Moreover, Hardwell claimed the festival did not pay him for his set but he still went to perform as his commitment to his fans outweighed the inconvenience.

== Discography ==
- United We Are (2015)
- Rebels Never Die (2022)

== Filmography ==
- Symphony: The Global Revolution of Dance (2022) – a concert performed during the Amsterdam Dance Event on 18 October 2018 at Ziggo Dome. Led and produced by Hardwell, the 87-song performance featured pop and jazz orchestra Metropole Orkest.
