= Animals (Martin Garrix song) =

2013 song by Martin Garrix

Single by Martin Garrix

from the EP Gold Skies
- Released: 17 June 2013
- Recorded: 2013
- Genre: Big room house
- Length: 5:04 (original mix); 2:57 (radio edit)
- Label: Spinnin'
- Songwriter: Martijn Garritsen
- Producer: Martin Garrix

Martin Garrix singles chronology
"Just Some Loops" (2013)	"Animals" (2013)	"Wizard" (2013)

Alternative UK and US cover

Music video
- "Animals" on YouTube

"Animals" is a big room house instrumental song by Dutch DJ and record producer Martin Garrix, released as a digital download on 17 June 2013 on iTunes. The song quickly became popular within the EDM culture, leading to Garrix becoming the youngest producer to ever have a song reach number one on the electronic music store Beatport. The track was a commercial success, reaching the top ten or topping on a number of electronic music charts and even some mainstream ones. It became number 1 on singles charts in the United Kingdom, French-speaking Switzerland and Belgium. In the United States it reached number 21 on the Billboard Hot 100 and number 1 on the Dance chart.

== Composition and release ==
Prior to release, the track gained buzz after being played anonymously with speculation increasing about the author after Dutch record label Spinnin' Records released a clip of the track online only titled "Animals (Teaser)". It started to reach even more speculation after a Vine video featuring Agnes from Despicable Me was posted. The track was, at various times, attributed to other acts like Hardwell, GTA, Sidney Samson and Bassjackers before the actual identity of the producer was revealed.

According to Garrix, the melody was based on a previous, never-released track that he composed two years prior, and the "ruthlessly minimalist" rhythmic sound (the drop) is an interpretation of Busta Rhymes' "What It Is". and the first part is inspiring to a song by Aura Qualic called D.A.T.A. The song is mostly instrumental; the only sung verse is We're the fucking animals, which is spoken by a friend of Garrix, has a low pitch, and appears two times.

== Critical reception ==
In 2016, Billboard named "Animals" Garrix's second-best song, behind "In the Name of Love". The review noted how Garrix "ushered in a new dance era and crowned the then-17-year-old, leader of the new school", further describing the song as "big, brash and infectious, everything a festival anthem should be. It still sounds dope so many years later".

== Commercial performance ==
Animals booked initial success at electronic music festivals and venues like Ultra Korea, Tomorrowland, Governors Beach Club, Amsterdam Dance Event, and Ultra Music Festival, to name a few. Subsequently, it rose to number one at the online music store, Beatport 100. In the period of August to October, the track began to climb up dance hit-lists as well as mainstream singles charts across continental Europe, getting all the way to top on Belgium's Ultratop 50. In November, the single debuted at number one on UK's Official Singles Chart, ahead of tough competition from Lily Allen's 2013 John Lewis Christmas advert cover single "Somewhere Only We Know" (which reached number one the following week) and Ellie Goulding's Children in Need 2013 cover "How Long Will I Love You?". Garrix became the second-youngest artist to enter at the top of the UK Singles Chart with their debut single behind Billie's "Because We Want To" in July 1998.

In the United States, "Animals" was the first instrumental track to reach the top 40 on the Billboard Hot 100 since Kenny G's "Millennium Mix" of "Auld Lang Syne" in 1999.

As of March 2026, the song's music video has over 1.8 billion views on YouTube.

== Usage in media ==
"Animals" was used in a commercial for video game Madden NFL 25. It was added in the March 2014 update of another game, Asphalt 8: Airborne. "Animals" was also featured on Just Dance 2016 along with an extreme routine. The instrumental version of the song was also featured in FIFA Online 3, an online free-to-play version of the FIFA series video game.

In April 2014, the track was also used in the Dior advertisement for their "Addict Fluid Stick" lipstick and lipgloss range.

In 2026, the song featured in a series of Christmas adverts for British supermarket Asda.

== Track listing ==
Digital download
No.	Title	Length
1.	"Animals" (original mix)	5:04

German CD single and digital download
No.	Title	Length
1.	"Animals" (radio edit)	2:56
2.	"Animals" (original mix)	5:04
Total length:		8:00

UK and Irish digital download – Remixes
No.	Title	Length
1.	"Animals" (UK radio edit)	2:44
2.	"Animals" (Grum Remix)	6:37
3.	"Animals" (Victor Niglio and Martin Garrix Festival Trap Mix)	3:18
4.	"Animals" (Isaac Remix)	4:15
Total length:		16:54

SPRS Remixes Part 1
No.	Title	Length
1.	"Animals" (Oliver Heldens Remix)	4:22
2.	"Animals" (Jay Ronko Remix)	4:13
3.	"Animals" (Victor Niglio and Martin Garrix Festival Trap Mix)	3:18
4.	"Animals" (Botnek Edit)	4:21
Total length:		18:54

== Charts ==
=== Weekly charts ===
Weekly chart performance
Chart (2013–2014)	Peak position
Australia (ARIA)	29
Austria (Ö3 Austria Top 40)	5
Belgium (Ultratop 50 Flanders)	1
Belgium Dance (Ultratop Flanders)	1
Belgium (Ultratop 50 Wallonia)	1
Belgium Dance (Ultratop Wallonia)	4
Canada Hot 100 (Billboard)	40
Canada CHR/Top 40 (Billboard)	10
CIS Airplay (TopHit)	30
Czech Republic Airplay (ČNS IFPI)	8
Czech Republic Singles Digital (ČNS IFPI)	25
Denmark (Tracklisten)	12
Euro Digital Song Sales (Billboard)	3
Finland (Suomen virallinen lista)	2
Finland Airplay (Radiosoittolista)	13
France (SNEP)	2
Germany (GfK)	4
Hungary (Dance Top 40)	1
Hungary (Rádiós Top 40)	7
Hungary (Single Top 40)	5
Ireland (IRMA)	3
Italy (FIMI)	14
Mexico (Billboard Mexican Airplay)	38
Mexico Anglo (Monitor Latino)	16
Netherlands (Dutch Top 40)	3
Netherlands (Single Top 100)	3
New Zealand (Recorded Music NZ)	10
Norway (VG-lista)	12
Romania (Airplay 100)	11
Romania Airplay (Media Forest)	5
Poland Airplay (ZPAV)	16
Poland Dance (ZPAV)	2
Russia Airplay (TopHit)	1
Scottish Singles Sales (Official Charts)	1
Slovakia Airplay (ČNS IFPI)	29
Slovakia Singles Digital (ČNS IFPI)	60
Spain (Promusicae)	6
Sweden (Sverigetopplistan)	4
Switzerland (Schweizer Hitparade)	2
UK Singles (Official Charts)	1
UK Dance (Official Charts)	1
Ukraine Airplay (TopHit)	58
US Billboard Hot 100	21
US Dance Club Songs (Billboard)	1
US Hot Dance/Electronic Songs (Billboard)	3
US Pop Airplay (Billboard)	12
US Rhythmic Airplay (Billboard)	23

=== Year-end charts ===
Annual chart rankings
Chart (2013)	Position
Austria (Ö3 Austria Top 40)	40
Belgium (Ultratop Flanders)	4
Belgium (Ultratop Wallonia)	7
France (SNEP)	21
Germany (Media Control AG)	26
Hungary (Dance Top 40)	19
Hungary (Rádiós Top 40)	51
Netherlands (Dutch Top 40)	16
Netherlands (Single Top 100)	12
Sweden (Sverigetopplistan)	21
Switzerland (Schweizer Hitparade)	14
UK Singles (Official Charts Company)	64
US Hot Dance/Electronic Songs (Billboard)	25

Chart (2014)	Position
Austria (Ö3 Austria Top 40)	42
Belgium (Ultratop Flanders)	70
Belgium (Ultratop Wallonia)	63
Germany (Official German Charts)	45
Hungary (Dance Top 40)	15
Italy (FIMI)	74
Russia Airplay (TopHit)	45
Spain (PROMUSICAE)	29
Sweden (Sverigetopplistan)	49
Switzerland (Schweizer Hitparade)	33
US Billboard Hot 100	71
US Hot Dance/Electronic Songs (Billboard)	8

=== Decade-end charts ===
Decennium chart rankings
Chart (2010–2019)	Position
US Hot Dance/Electronic Songs (Billboard)	42

== Certifications ==
Certifications and sales
Region	Certification	Certified units/sales
Australia (ARIA)	Platinum	70,000^{^}
Belgium (BRMA)	2× Platinum	60,000^{*}
Brazil (Pro-Música Brasil)	Platinum	60,000^{‡}
Canada (Music Canada)	2× Platinum	160,000^{*}
Denmark (IFPI Danmark)	Gold	15,000^{^}
Germany (BVMI)	Platinum	300,000^{^}
Italy (FIMI)	2× Platinum	60,000^{‡}
New Zealand (RMNZ)	Platinum	15,000^{*}
Norway (IFPI Norway)	2× Platinum	20,000^{‡}
Spain (Promusicae)	Platinum	60,000^{‡}
Sweden (GLF)	Platinum	40,000^{‡}
United Kingdom (BPI)	Platinum	600,000^{‡}
United States (RIAA)	2× Platinum	2,000,000^{‡}
Streaming
Denmark (IFPI Danmark)	2× Platinum	3,600,000^{†}
Spain (Promusicae)	Gold	4,000,000^{†}
^{*} Sales figures based on certification alone.^{^} Shipments figures based on certification alone.^{‡} Sales+streaming figures based on certification alone.^{†} Streaming-only figures based on certification alone.

== Release history ==
Street dates
Country	Date	Version	Format(s)	Label	Ref.
Worldwide	1 July 2013	Single version; radio edit	Digital download	Spinnin'	
Germany	2 August 2013	Single version; radio edit	Digital download	Tiger	
Scandinavia	8 October 2013	Single version; radio edit	Digital download	disco:wax	
United Kingdom	10 November 2013	Single version; radio edit	Digital download	Silent; Republic	
United Kingdom	8 November 2013	Remixes – EP	Digital download	Silent; Republic	
United States	17 September 2013	Single version	Digital download	Silent; Republic	
United States	24 September 2013	Radio edit	Mainstream airplay	Silent; Republic	
Worldwide	16 January 2023	Single version; radio edit; remixes – EP	Digital download	STMPD	

== Parodies ==
In December 2013, a SoundCloud user named McMaNGOS posted an edited version of "Animals" titled "Funnymals", which remixes the song's drop to the tune of "Old McDonald Had a Farm". The "Funnymals" edit gained prominence at the 2014 Ultra Music Festival, when Deadmau5 (who had made comments attacking Garrix on Twitter earlier in the day, and has been a prominent critic of "mainstream" electronic music) played the edit as part of his live set.

== See also ==
- List of Billboard number-one dance songs of 2013
