= Big room house =

Music genre

- Stylistic origins: House; electro house; progressive house; dutch house; tech house; trance; uplifting trance; techno; hardstyle; hard house
- Cultural origins: Late 2000s (decade), Europe, particularly in Sweden, Norway and the Netherlands
- Typical instruments: Drum machine; keyboard; personal computer; sampler; sequencer; DAW; synthesizer; vocals
- Derivative forms: Festival progressive house; jungle terror

Fusion genres
- Festival trap

A 30-second sample using generic DAW big room house "drop" with additional buildup samples, 2014—2022

Big room house or simply big room is a fusion subgenre of house music (notably progressive house and electro house) that gained popularity in the early 2010s. Although the term "big room" started appearing in news articles circa 2007, the current state of this subgenre emerged around 2010—12 and was popularized by songs such as "Epic" and "Cannonball". From 2013 on, artists like Martin Garrix, KSHMR, Dimitri Vegas & Like Mike, Hardwell, Blasterjaxx, W&W, R3HAB and others began experimenting with this sound in their compositions.

The genre is generally set at a tempo that falls between 126 and 132 BPM. Songs typically include long buildups followed by an electro-style drop accompanied by the four on the floor kick drums typical of house music. Melodies are often simple and minimal, though a techno-inspired supersaw is frequently used.

== History ==
By the fall of 2012, the popularity of Electronic dance music (EDM) had exploded. EDM-only festivals began to pop up all over the United States with headline bills featuring internationally touring talents like acts like Skrillex, Tiësto, and Armin van Buuren. No longer restricted to underground raves and soft-ticketed club nights, EDM continued to grow as festivals for progressive house, dubstep, electro house, trance and drum and bass all took place together. DJs began to recognize the need to make music suited for the larger venues and arenas they had begun to play and would play for years to come. As multi-genre EDM festivals like Ultra Music Festival, Electric Zoo and HARD Summer and Swedish House Mafia-like arena tours quickly became the norm in all of electronic dance music, DJs began focusing on making music specifically to be played in these new 'big', commercially-driven spaces. The backlash from other DJs, industry insiders and long-time ravers became predictable as the direct tie-in to commercial viability and music's relative simplistic composition made it an easy target. Unlike trance's richly programmed arpeggios or house music's culturally important samples, big room house didn't have any inborne unique or virtuoso qualities to it; instead much more reliant on the context in which its deployed.

Though there are numerous classic big room house songs now, "Animals" remains among the most important. The song's emergence and subsequent coverage was the first to even make mention of the term "big room" and is responsible for the phenomenon's explosion.

To put it simply, the track "Animals" itself fits a formula. This formula is illustrated clearly in the track's "drop," thereby underlining "Animals" uncanny similarities to Knife Party's "LRAD" or Sandro Silva & Quintino's "Epic." Take this a step further and compare "Animals" to Carnage & Borgore's smash "Incredible" or the last two GTA big room collaborative bangers in "Hit It!" and "Turn It Up!" The sonic similarities between these tracks are so glaring that once you notice them, you can't un-notice them.

— 808sJake, Spinnin' the Truth: Copycatism and Martin Garrix's Stuffed "Animals", Complex Media

In 2016, Beatport added the Big Room genre, putting producers such as Deadmau5 and Wolfgang Gartner under the category.

== Structure ==
The structure of big room house songs is similar to that of American progressive house of the late 2000s. There are two build-ups complete with breaks, two drop sections, and one or two breakdowns, one of which may or may not include the intro/outro phase. Unlike progressive house, big room is adapted to radio edited format and features either the first or the second build-up usually much longer than the other one. In case of remixes, one usually features the whole vocal/riff sample of the initial song, while the other build-up is a simple break that is significantly shorter and prepares the listener for the drop.

Big room features relative minimalism, with the sound enhanced by 'large-hall' reverb effects. One bassline, often aided by one or two highs and lows, creates the mood for the whole composition. Unlike in electro house proper, where the bass itself is subject to additional wave effects (such as attack, threshold and sustain) to beautify the melody, in big room house, only the way the sound is released plays a major role. Henceforth, the drum beats are made minimal, sometimes with only a kick or tom and a couple of hi-hats.

== Criticisms ==
The genre has been criticized by several musicians, who have described it as 'stereotypical EDM sound lacking originality and creativity' and said that it is homogeneous and lacks originality, diversity, and artistic merit. Mixmag described the genre as composing of "titanic breakdowns and spotless, monotone production aesthetics". Wolfgang Gartner described the genre as a "joke", and disregarded it, alongside conglomerates such as SFX Entertainment, as "digestible cheap dance music". He also called the genre "the EDM Apocalypse", saying "real music should have some soul and authenticity to it, and not just be a big kick drum and a techno like breakdown with a cheesy one-liner and a 'big drop'".

Writing for Complex Media, Jake Lang (808sJake) noted the songs' formulaic appeal: "The issue here is that "Animals" and the other tracks listed (as well as those like it) have all done exceedingly well despite a lack of originality. It is this copycatism that seriously harms the future of dance music and potential cultural impact as a whole...In reality, they are tawdry examples of producers looking for the shortest possible path to a main stage".

Russell Smith of The Globe and Mail observes a "fiery friction" between fans of traditional underground electronic music and the newer, typically younger fans who have arisen as a result of big room's movement of EDM into the mainstream.
