= Matisse & Sadko discography =

This is the discography for Russian musical duo Matisse & Sadko.

== Extended plays ==
- Break Through the Silence (2015, with Martin Garrix)

== Charted singles ==
Title	Year	Peak chart positions			Album
Title	Year	BEL (Fl)	BEL (Wa)	EST Air.	Album
"Hi Scandinavia!"	2011	—^{[A]}	—^{[B]}	*	Non-album singles
"Slvr" (with Steve Angello)	2013	—^{[C]}	—^{[D]}	*	Non-album singles
"Riot" (with Arty)	2014	—^{[E]}	—	*	Non-album singles
"Dragon" (with Martin Garrix)	2015	55^{[F]}	26^{[G]}	—	Break Through the Silence (with Martin Garrix)
"Break Through the Silence" (with Martin Garrix)	2015	—	39^{[H]}	—	Break Through the Silence (with Martin Garrix)
"Whole Again" (with Six40Two)	2026	—	—	67	Non-album single
"—" denotes a recording that did not chart or was not released in that territory. "*" denotes that the chart did not exist at that time.

== Other singles ==
Year	Title	Label	Album
2011	"Svenska"	Armada Zouk	Non-album singles
2011	"We’re Not Alone (Hi Scandinavia!)" (with Olly James)	Armada Zouk	Non-album singles
2011	"Amulet"	Pilot	Non-album singles
2012	"The Legend" (with Swanky Tunes)	Refune Music	Non-album singles
2012	"Trio" (with Arty)	Axtone Records	Non-album singles
2012	"Chemistry (Turn the Flame Higher)" (with Hard Rock Sofa and with Swanky Tunes)	Showland Records	Non-album singles
2013	"Stars"	Doorn Records	Non-album singles
2014	"Sigure"	Doorn Records	Non-album singles
2014	"Azonto"	Armada Trice	Non-album singles
2014	"Persia"	Size Records	Non-album singles
2015	"Memories"	Spinnin' Deep	Non-album singles
2015	"Tengu" (with Vigel)	Doorn Records	Non-album singles
2015	"Lock 'N' Load"	Spinnin' Records	Non-album singles
2016	"Get Busy" (with TITUS)	Doorn Records	Non-album singles
2016	"Go! (2016 Ice Hockey World Championship Official Anthem)"	Monomark Music	Non-album singles
2016	"Machine Gun"	Monomark Music	Non-album singles
2016	"Ninjas"	Dim Mak Records	Non-album singles
2016	"Together" (with Martin Garrix)	Stmpd Rcrds	Seven
2016	"Ya Amar"	Monomark Music	Non-album singles
2017	"Jank' N' Gank"	Spinnin' Copyright Free Music	Non-album singles
2017	"Hndz Up"	Dim Mak Records	Non-album singles
2017	"Forever" (with Martin Garrix)	Stmpd Rcrds	Non-album singles
2017	"Witchcraft"	Monomark Music	Non-album singles
2017	"Into You" (featuring Hanne Mjøen)	Stmpd Rcrds	Non-album singles
2018	"Dawnbreaker" (with Tiësto)	Musical Freedom	I Like It Loud
2018	"Grizzly"	Stmpd Rcrds	Non-album singles
2018	"Built for Us"	Monomark Music	Non-album singles
2018	"Mystery" (featuring Swedish Red Elephant)	Stmpd Rcrds	Non-album singles
2018	"Light Me Up" (with Raiden)	Protocol Recordings	Non-album singles
2018	"Saga"	Stmpd Rcrds	Non-album singles
2018	"Takeoff"	Musical Freedom	Non-album singles
2018	"Melodicca"	Self-released	Non-album singles
2019	"Don't Tell Me" (with Aspyer featuring Matluck)	Stmpd Rcrds	Non-album singles
2019	"Mistaken" (with Martin Garrix featuring Alex Aris)	Stmpd Rcrds	Non-album singles
2019	"Another Side" (with Robert Falcon featuring Wrabel)	Stmpd Rcrds	Non-album singles
2019	"Let It Buzz (as Daffy Muffin)	Revealed Recordings	Hardwell Presents Revealed Vol. 10
2019	"Selecta" (as Daffy Muffin)	Protocol Recordings	Non-album singles
2019	"Doberman"	Stmpd Rcrds	Non-album singles
2019	"Fade Away" (featuring Smbdy)	Stmpd Rcrds	Non-album singles
2019	"Hold On" (with Martin Garrix featuring Michel Zitron)	Stmpd Rcrds	Non-album singles
2020	"Best Thing" (featuring Matluck)	Stmpd Rcrds	Non-album singles
2020	"Strings Again"	Stmpd Rcrds	Non-album singles
2020	"Now or Never"	Stmpd Rcrds	Non-album singles
2020	"Sweet Life"	Stmpd Rcrds	Non-album singles
2021	"Meant To Be"	Stmpd Rcrds	Non-album singles
2021	"Heal Me" (featuring Alex Aris)	Stmpd Rcrds	Non-album singles
2021	"OK" (featuring Lovespeake)	Warner Music	Non-album singles
2021	"Dawn" (featuring Alex Aris)	Monomark	Non-album singles
2021	"All We Got" (as Shy Baboon with Maejor)	Stmpd Rcrds	Non-album singles
2021	"I Told You" (as Shy Baboon)	Stmpd Rcrds	Non-album singles
2021	"Relight My Love" (with Mougleta)	Tomorrowland Music	Non-album singles
2021	"Won't Let You Go" (with Martin Garrix and John Martin)	Stmpd Rcrds	Non-album singles
2022	"Into The Fire" (with Arsnøvä)	Monomark	Non-album singles
2022	"Good Morning" (with Martin Garrix)	Stmpd Rcrds	Sentio
2022	"Feeling" (with Timofey)	Tomorrowland Music	Non-album singles
2022	"Me Without Us" (with Raiden and Justin Jesso)	Warner Music Finland	Non-album singles
2023	"Afterglow" (with Michel Zitron)	Stmpd Rcrds	Non-album singles
2023	"Alala"	Stmpd Rcrds	Non-album singles
2023	"Lefka"	Stmpd Rcrds / Tomorrowland Music	Stmpd Rcrds x Tomorrowland Music Vol. II
2023	"Holiday" (with Swedish Red Elephant)	Sony Music	Non-album singles
2023	"Promise You" (featuring Justin J. Moore)	Tomorrowland Music	Non-album singles
2023	"Pull Me Through The Fire" (with James French)	Stmpd Rcrds	Non-album singles
2024	"Jadore"	Monomark	Non-album singles
2024	"Shadows" (featuring Blythe)	Tomorrowland Music	Non-album singles
2024	"Dark Days Are Gone" (with Florentin featuring Sam Martin)	Sony Music	Non-album singles
2024	"Verve"	Monomark	Non-album singles
2024	"Discohall" (as Shy Baboon)	Monomark	Non-album singles
2024	"Once Again" (with Sentinel)	Stmpd Rcrds	Non-album singles
2024	"Himalaya"	Stmpd Rcrds	Non-album singles
2025	"Harmony"	Monomark	Non-album singles
2025	"Take Me There" (with Sick Individuals and Third Party)	Tomorrowland Music	Non-album singles
2025	"Butterflies" (with Martin Garrix featuring Barbz)	Stmpd Rcrds	Non-album singles
2025	"Higher"	Monomark	Non-album singles
2026	"Pull Up" (with Vion Konger featuring Scrufizzer)	Stmpd Rcrds	Non-album singles

== Remixes ==
Year	Track name	Original artist	Label
2012	"Beating of My Heart" (Matisse & Sadko Remix)	M-3ox and Heidrun	Heat Recordings
2012	"Unity" (Matisse & Sadko Remix)	Shinedown	Atlantic Records
2012	"Can't Stop Now" (Matisse & Sadko Remix)	The Aston Shuffle	Spinnin' Records
2013	"Neon Eyes [Into The Deep]" (Matisse & Sadko Remix)	Saints of Valory	F-Stop Records / Atlantic
2015	"Next to Me" (Matisse & Sadko Remix)	Otto Knows	Big Beat Records
2015	"In My Head" (Matisse & Sadko Remix)	Galantis	Big Beat Records
2016	"Hey" (Matisse & Sadko Remix)	Fais (featuring Afrojack)	Wall Recordings
2018	"Dreamer" (Matisse & Sadko Remix)	Axwell & Ingrosso	Virgin EMI Records
2018	"The Other" (Matisse & Sadko Remix)	Lauv	Self-released
2022	"Forever 1" (Matisse & Sadko Remix)	Girls' Generation	ScreaM Records

== Production credits ==
Year	Track name	Artist	Label	Contribution	Produced with
2018	"Phantom"	Dimitri Vangelis & Wyman	Buce Recordings	Co-production	Dimitri Vangelis & Wyman
2018	"High On Life"	Martin Garrix	Stmpd Rcrds	Production	Martin Garrix; Giorgio Tuinfort
2018	"Dreamer"	Martin Garrix	Stmpd Rcrds	Production	Martin Garrix
2021	"Fire"	Ytram (Martin Garrix) and Elderbrook	Stmpd Rcrds	Production	Martin Garrix

== Notes ==
- A "Hi Scandinavia!" did not enter the Ultratop 50, but peaked at number 38 on the Flemish Dance chart.
- B "Hi Scandinavia!" did not enter the Ultratop 50, but peaked at number 30 on the Walloon Dance chart.
- C "SLVR" did not enter the Ultratop 50, but peaked at number 1 on the Flemish Dance chart.
- D "SLVR" did not enter the Ultratop 50, but peaked at number 2 on the Walloon Dance chart.
- E "Riot" did not enter the Ultratop 50, but peaked at number 2 on the Flemish Dance chart.
- F "Dragon" did not enter the Ultratop 50, but peaked at number 55 on the Flemish Ultratip chart.
- G "Dragon" did not enter the Ultratop 50, but peaked at number 26 on the Walloon Ultratip chart.
- H "Break Through the Silence" did not enter the Ultratop 50, but peaked on the Walloon Ultratip chart.
