= Home (Martin Garrix song) =

Single by Martin Garrix featuring Bonn
- Released: 16 August 2019
- Genre: Electro house; Progressive house; Dance pop
- Length: 3:59
- Label: Stmpd; Epic Amsterdam; Sony Netherlands
- Songwriters: Martijn Garritsen; Albin Nedler; Kristoffer Fogelmark; John Martin; Michel Zitron
- Producer: Martin Garrix

Martin Garrix singles chronology
"These Are the Times" (2019)	"Home" (2019)	"Used to Love" (2019)

Music video
- "Home" on YouTube

"Home" is a song recorded by Dutch DJ Martin Garrix featuring Swedish vocalist Bonn. It was released via Garrix's Netherlands-based record label Stmpd Rcrds, and exclusively licensed to Epic Amsterdam, a division of Sony Music, on 16 August 2019. The song's production credits consist of late musician Avicii's co-producer Albin Nedler, who has worked for many tracks of Avicii's posthumous album "Tim", John Martin and Michel Zitron, who were behind some songs of Swedish House Mafia. The song marks the third collaboration between Martin Garrix and Bonn, after "High on Life" and "No Sleep".

== Background ==
"Home", first called "Take Me Home", was premiered during his headlining performance at Fuji Rock Festival in Japan from 26 to 28 July 2019. Few moments later, a popular fan page dedicated to Garrix shared a snippet of the song recorded from the YouTube Music stream of the event, while Bonn posted on Instagram a footage of the song and confirmed the future release of their third collaboration. Garrix played it too at his Stmpd Rcrds stage at Tomorrowland, before teasing during the official after movie. On 15 August, Garrix posted the cover of the song on Instagram, leading a message saying "Tomorrow!!"

During an interview for Spanish daily newspaper La Vanguardia on September 6, 2019, Garrix expressed his admiration for Bonn's incredible voice, stating, "Bonn's voice is absolutely amazing. We've been working hard, and I still didn't have enough! The environment that is created when we are in the study is indescribable and I am impatient to return to the study with him."

== Critical reception ==
Ross Goldenberg from Dancing Astronaut remarked that Garrix "mildly deviates from the lighthearted resolve that "High on Life" and "No Sleep" exude" and put forward his "acoustic versatility". According to him, when the singer says "back to my roots", it refers to memories of Garrix's electro house blends in previous songs, like "Forbidden Voices" or "Oops". According to the DJ, it means that he "[loves] being on a tour, but there comes a point where returning home to Amsterdam is what [he needs] most". John Cameron from EDM.com wrote that the song "shows the ability of synth work for which Martin Garrix is known with pop-friendly instrumentals". Writing for Your EDM, Matthew Meadow remarked the important ability of Garrix to change and cross musical genres, comparing "Home" to his previous singles. According to him, the guitar chords remind the American rock band Nirvana. He noticed that Bonn's vocals perfectly complement this punk effect and described the drop as more electronic and pronounced, which still contains "reeks of a grunge and punk demeanor".

== Music video ==
The official music video of the song was released at the same day through Martin Garrix's YouTube channel. It starts with a young man who gets up in an apartment where a big party took place during the previous evening. The man changes to go out and have fun in a casino and then in a pub. Gradually alcoholic, he begins to see blurry, then he fights with a security man and ends up in an ambulance. But he escapes from it and goes to a bar to meet a friend. Accompanied by his daughter-in-law, he then goes to a hotel where he is stunned and stolen. Finally, he wakes up and goes to a forest, where he discovers a house where his friends are. Garrix remarked in his interview for Spanish daily newspaper La Vanguardia that the video is not a reflection of his life. He said: "We wanted to offer something different, but it doesn't reflect my life".

== Credits and personnel ==
Credits adapted from Tidal.

- Martin Garrix – production, composition, lyrics
- Albin Nedler – composition, lyrics
- Kristoffer Fogelmark – composition, lyrics
- John Martin – composition
- Michel Zitron – composition

== Charts ==
Chart (2019–20)	Peak position
Belgium Dance (Ultratop Wallonia)	17
CIS Airplay (TopHit)	30
Hungary (Rádiós Top 40)	31
Netherlands (Dutch Top 40)	21
Netherlands (Single Top 100)	94
Russia Airplay (TopHit)	27
Sweden (Sverigetopplistan)	61
Ukraine Airplay (TopHit)	19
US Hot Dance/Electronic Songs (Billboard)	37

== Certifications ==
Region	Certification	Certified units/sales
Brazil (Pro-Música Brasil)	Gold	20,000^{‡}
^{‡} Sales+streaming figures based on certification alone.
