= Mesto =

Dutch electronic musician, remixer and DJ

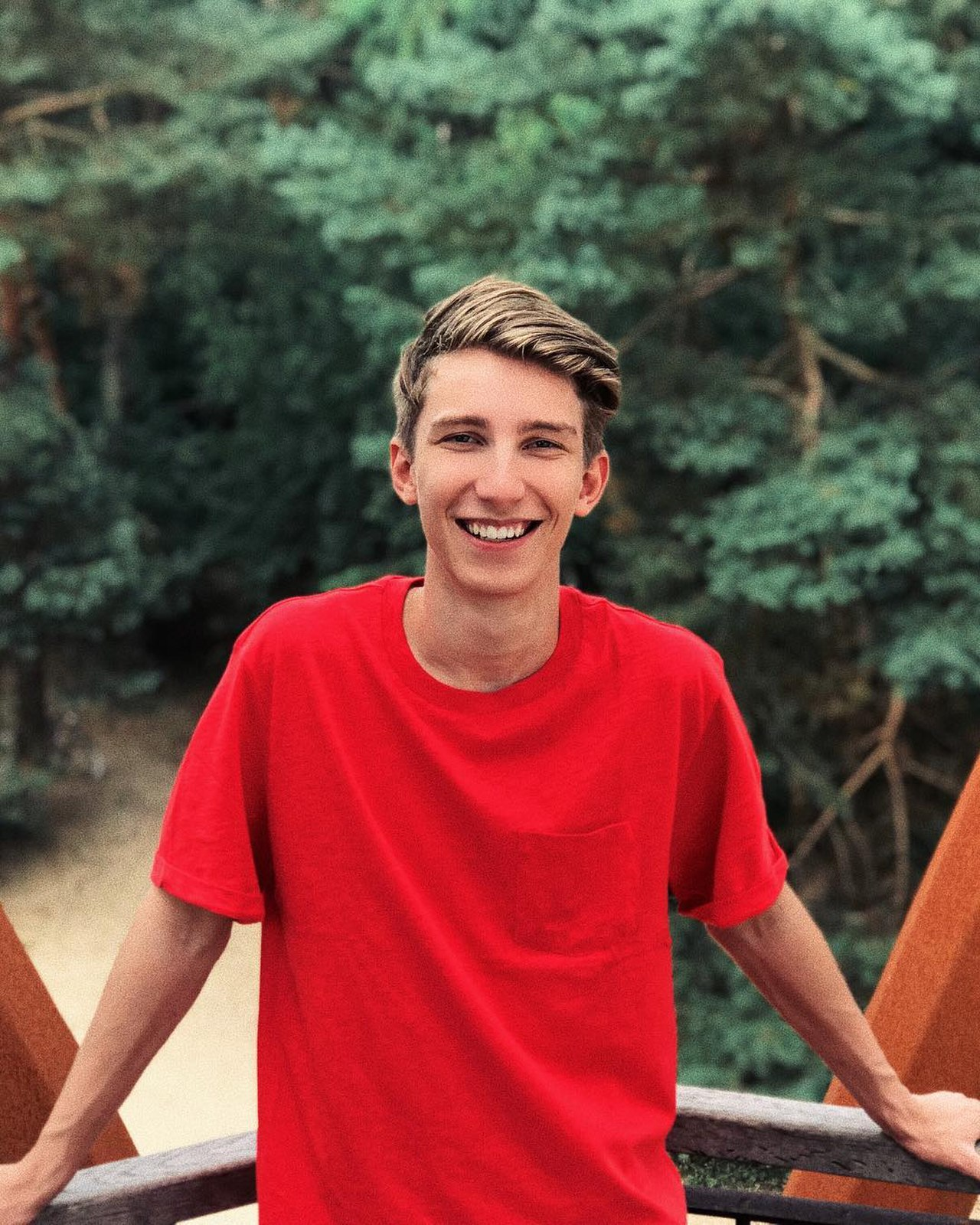
- Mesto in 2018

Background information
- Born: Melle Kiet Stomp; September 30, 1999 (age 27); Amstelveen, North Holland, Netherlands
- Genres: Future house; progressive house; future bounce; electro house; future bass
- Occupations: Musician; DJ; record producer; remixer
- Instrument: FL Studio
- Years active: 2014–present
- Labels: Spinnin' Records; Musical Freedom; STMPD RCRDS
- Website: mestomusic.com

Melle Kiet Stomp (born September 30, 1999), known professionally as Mesto, is a Dutch musician, DJ, record producer and remixer. He rose to fame after working and collaborating with Martin Garrix (born in the same town of Amstelveen) on the single "Bouncybob".

== Biography ==
=== Early life ===
Melle Kiet Stomp was born on September 30, 1999 in Amstelveen, Netherlands. When he was 6, he started playing the violin. By the age of 11, he began playing the drums and shortly thereafter became interested in making music. He also developed an interest in deep house and future house when he heard "Gecko" by Oliver Heldens and taught himself how to do it by learning it from YouTube. At the age of 14, he became inspired when he 'touched' a DJ set for the first time, prompting him to download specialist software, FL Studio, and enabling him to start composing. He started making deep house music at that same age, but moved to slightly harder house, as well as future house. He studied at the Herman Brood Academy, a production school in Utrecht where fellow Dutch DJs Martin Garrix and Julian Jordan also went to.

=== Career ===
Mesto began his career in 2014, when he was only 15 years old and his first official release was the single "Go!", a collaboration with Alex Ranzino which was released as a free download on November 10. Shortly afterwards, he and Benfield released a remix of "Rude", a single by Magic!. He then collaborated with Mike Williams to release a bootleg of "Raise Your Hands" by Ummet Ozcan.

He started 2015 by releasing a single titled "New York". It was followed by his third single "Tokyo" in February. In April, he released a bootleg of "Lean On" by Major Lazer and DJ Snake featuring MØ in April. The single "Rio" was released in May before the bootleg of "Satisfied" by Showtek featuring Vassy in September. Mesto's single "Tetris (Truffle Butter Mashup)" was released as a free download on December 9, 2015. He was featured in production alongside Justin Mylo in Martin Garrix's single "Bouncybob", which was released as a free download on December 31, 2015.

On January 6, 2016, Mesto performed alongside Martin Garrix and Justin Mylo at Bij Igmar on SLAM!. In April, he remixed "Me, Myself & I" by G-Eazy and Bebe Rexha, officially released on April 26. The remix was followed by the bootleg of "Another You" by Armin van Buuren featuring Mr. Probz in that same month and the remix of "We're Guna Fight Em Off" by Ill Phil in June. In July, he and Justin Mylo remixed "Final Call", a single by Florian Picasso for the Remixes EP, officially released on July 8. On October 10, 2016, it was announced that Mesto signed a contract with Spinnin' Records. That same month, he released the single "Wiee", his second collaboration with Martin Garrix on the latter's label Stmpd Rcrds. The single was played by Garrix as an ID at the Home Festival in Treviso, Italy in early September, and was a part of his seven-track extended play Seven. Mesto also performed at the Amsterdam Dance Event for the first time. On December 16, 2016, he released a remix of "Alone" by NERVO and Askery featuring Brielle Von Hugel, which was his first release on Spinnin' Records. A day later, he was a guest and performed at Midden In Je Weekend Show on SLAM!. He then performed at Mezz in Breda during the "3FM Clubhuis presents" and "DJs for 3FM Serious Request".

On January 16, 2017, Mesto released "Chatterbox", a collaboration with Fox Stevenson through Spinnin' Records. Shortly afterwards, he revealed "Step Up Your Game", his drum and bass debut single on Spinnin' Premium. The single was available as a free download on Spinnin' Records' website until March 17, after that date it was released on iTunes, Beatport and Spotify. He then released a remix for "Not Going Home", a single by DVBBS and CMC$ featuring Gia Koka. On April 10, 2017, he collaborated with Curbi on "Bruh", which would be his first release through Tiësto's label Musical Freedom. Together with Mike Williams and Sophie Francis, the two also organized benefit concerts for a school in Limburg. On July 10, 2017, Mesto released the single "Chances", featuring Brielle Von Hugel. An official music video for the song was released. In October, he attended the Amsterdam Dance Event for the second time in Amsterdam. Mesto's official remix of David Guetta and Afrojack's single "Dirty Sexy Money" came out in December 2017, and was his last release for the year.

Mesto's first release of 2018, a remix of Sam Feldt and Girls Love DJs' single "Just Dropped In (My Condition)", was included on Feldt's remix album After the Sunset. Following the remix, he collaborated with Tiësto for the single "Coming Home". The single was followed by "Save Me" with Jay Hardway in June. Mesto then released "Missing You" in September. He also attended the Amsterdam Dance Event in Amsterdam. He ended 2018 with "Wait Another Day", collaborating with Mike Williams. Released through Spinnin' Records on December, the single gained significant radio play on Radio 538 in the Netherlands, among other stations.

Mesto continued to release singles on both Spinnin' and Musical Freedom into 2019. His first single of the year, "Leyla", was followed by his second collaboration with Tiësto for "Can't Get Enough", which was released on March 29. Afterwards, he released two more singles: "Back & Forth" and "Your Melody" (with Jonas Aden). During the summer, he also played at various festivals such as Dance Valley, Sunrise Festival, World Club Dome and New Horizons. In September, together with Felix Jaehn, he released the single "Never Alone" which featured vocals from John Martin and Michel Zitron under the alias VCATION. He also hosted an event of the Amsterdam Dance Event at Jimmy Woo. His final single of 2019, "Don't Worry", featured vocals by American singer Aloe Blacc and was released on November 29 through Spinnin' Records.

== Discography ==
=== Charting singles ===
Year	Title	Peak chart positions				Album
Year	Title	NLD	BEL (Fl)	BEL (Wa)	US Dance	Album
2015	"Bouncybob" (Martin Garrix featuring Justin Mylo and Mesto)	—^{[A]}	—	—^{[B]}	28	Non-album single
2016	"Wiee" (with Martin Garrix)	—^{[C]}	—^{[D]}	—^{[E]}	—	Seven
2017	"Chatterbox" (with Fox Stevenson)	—	—^{[F]}	—^{[G]}	—	Non-album singles
2017	"Bruh" (with Curbi)	—	—^{[H]}	—	—	Non-album singles
2018	"Save Me" (with Jay Hardway)	—	—^{[I]}	—	—	Non-album singles
2018	"Wait Another Day" (with Mike Williams)	—^{[J]}	—^{[K]}	—^{[L]}	—	Non-album singles
2019	"Never Alone" (with Felix Jaehn featuring Vcation)	—	—	—^{[M]}	—	Non-album singles
2020	"The G.O.A.T." (with Oliver Heldens)	—	—^{[N]}	—	—	Non-album singles
"—" denotes a recording that did not chart or was not released in that territory.

=== Singles ===
- 2014: "Go!" (with Alex Ranzino) [Free Download]
- 2015: "New York" [Free Download]
- 2015: "Tokyo" [Free Download]
- 2015: "Rio" [Free Download]
- 2015: "Bouncybob" (Martin Garrix featuring Justin Mylo and Mesto) [Free Download]
- 2016: "Wiee" (with Martin Garrix) [STMPD RCRDS]
- 2017: "Chatterbox" (with Fox Stevenson) [Spinnin' Records]
- 2017: "Step Up Your Game" [Spinnin' Premium]
- 2017: "Bruh" (with Curbi) [Musical Freedom (Spinnin')]
- 2017: "Chances" (featuring Brielle Von Hugel) [Spinnin' Records]
- 2018: "Coming Home" (with Tiësto) [Musical Freedom (Spinnin')]
- 2018: "Save Me" (with Jay Hardway) [Spinnin' Records]
- 2018: "Give Me Love" [Musical Freedom (Spinnin')]
- 2018: "Missing You" [Spinnin' Records]
- 2018: "Wait Another Day" (with Mike Williams) [Spinnin' Records]
- 2019: "Leyla" [Spinnin' Records]
- 2019: "Can't Get Enough" (with Tiësto) [Musical Freedom (Spinnin')]
- 2019: "Back & Forth" [Spinnin' Records]
- 2019: "Your Melody" (with Jonas Aden) [Musical Freedom (Spinnin')]
- 2019: "Never Alone" (with Felix Jaehn featuring Vcation) [Virgin]
- 2019: "Don't Worry" (featuring Aloe Blacc) [Spinnin' Records]
- 2020: "The G.O.A.T." (with Oliver Heldens) [Heldeep (Spinnin')]
- 2020: "Long Time" (with Brooks) [Spinnin' Records]
- 2020: "Looking Back" [Spinnin' Records]
- 2020: "When We're Gone" (with Justin Mylo) [STMPD RCRDS]
- 2021: "Don't Wait" (with Dastic featuring Claudy) [Spinnin' Records]
- 2022: "Limitless" (with Martin Garrix) [STMPD RCRDS]
- 2022: "Where Do We Go" (with Vluarr) [Spinnin' Records]
- 2022: "Better Days" (feat. Aloe Blacc) [Spinnin' Records]
- 2023: "Bring It Back" [Spinnin' Records]
- 2024: "Breakaway" (with Martin Garrix featuring Wilhelm) [STMPD RCRDS]
- 2024: "Decensus" (with Zedd featuring Dora Jar) [Interscope Records]

=== Production and songwriting credits ===
- 2018: Throttle - "Like This"
- 2019: Throttle - "Japan"
- 2020: Mike Williams and Justin Mylo featuring Sara Sangfelt - "Face Up to the Sun"

=== Remixes ===
- 2014: Magic! - "Rude" (Mesto and Benfield Remix)
- 2014: Ummet Ozcan - "Raise Your Hands" (Mike Williams and Mesto Future Bootleg) [Spinnin' Records]
- 2015: Major Lazer and DJ Snake featuring MØ - "Lean On" (Mesto Future Bootleg) [Mad Decent]
- 2015: Showtek featuring Vassy - "Satisfied" (Mesto Future Bootleg) [Skink]
- 2016: G-Eazy and Bebe Rexha - "Me, Myself & I" (Mesto Remix) [RCA Records]
- 2016: Armin van Buuren featuring Mr. Probz - "Another You" (Mesto Bootleg) [Armada Music]
- 2016: Ill Phil - "We're Guna Fight Em Off" (Mesto Remix) [Free Download]
- 2016: Florian Picasso - "Final Call" (Mesto and Justin Mylo Remix) [Protocol Recordings]
- 2016: NERVO and Askery featuring Brielle Von Hugel - "Alone" (Mesto Remix) [Spinnin' Records]
- 2017: DVBBS and CMC$ featuring Gia Koka - "Not Going Home" (Mesto Remix) [Free Download]
- 2017: David Guetta and Afrojack featuring Charli XCX and French Montana - "Dirty Sexy Money" (Mesto Remix) [What A Music]
- 2018: Sam Feldt and Girls Love DJs featuring Joe Cleere - "Just Dropped In (My Condition)" (Mesto Remix) [Spinnin' Remixes]
- 2018: The Chainsmokers - "You Owe Me" (Mesto Remix) [Disruptor/Columbia]
- 2018: Kungs and Stargate featuring Goldn - "Be Right Here" (Mesto Remix) [Barclay]
- 2021: Mike Williams and Felix Jaehn featuring Jordan Shaw - "Without You" (Mesto Remix) [Universal Music]

== Notes ==
- A "Bouncybob" did not enter the Singles Top 100, but peaked at number 16 on the Single Tip chart.
- B "Bouncybob" did not enter the Ultratop 50, but peaked at number 7 on the Walloon Dance Bubbling Under chart.
- C "Wiee" did not enter the Singles Top 100, but peaked at number 24 on the Single Tip chart.
- D "Wiee" did not enter the Ultratop 50, but peaked on the Flemish Ultratip chart.
- E "Wiee" did not enter the Ultratop 50, but peaked at number 15 on the Walloon Dance Bubbling Under chart.
- F "Chatterbox" did not enter the Ultratop 50, but peaked on the Flemish Ultratip chart.
- G "Chatterbox" did not enter the Ultratop 50, but peaked at number 17 on the Walloon Dance Bubbling Under chart.
- H "Bruh" did not enter the Ultratop 50, but peaked at number 17 on the Flemish Dance Bubbling Under chart.
- I "Save Me" did not enter the Ultratop 50, but peaked on the Flemish Ultratip chart.
- J "Wait Another Day" did not enter the Singles Top 100, but peaked at number 21 on the Single Tip chart.
- K "Wait Another Day" did not enter the Ultratop 50, but peaked on the Flemish Ultratip chart.
- L "Wait Another Day" did not enter the Ultratop 50, but peaked on the Walloon Ultratip chart.
- M "Never Alone" did not enter the Ultratop 50, but peaked on the Walloon Ultratip chart.
- N "The G.O.A.T." did not enter the Ultratop 50, but peaked on the Flemish Ultratip chart.
