= These Are the Times (Martin Garrix song) =

Single by Martin Garrix featuring JRM
- Released: 18 July 2019
- Genre: Tropical house
- Length: 3:08
- Label: Stmpd; Epic Amsterdam; Sony Netherlands
- Songwriters: Martijn Garritsen; Jaramye Daniels; Brandon Green; Giorgio Tuinfort
- Producer: Martin Garrix

Martin Garrix singles chronology
"Summer Days" (2019)	"These Are the Times" (2019)	"Home" (2019)

Music video
- "These Are the Times" on YouTube

"These Are the Times" is a song recorded by Dutch DJ and record producer Martin Garrix featuring Jamaican vocalist JRM. It was released via Garrix's Netherlands-based record label Stmpd Rcrds, and exclusively licensed to Epic Amsterdam, a division of Sony Music, on 18 July 2019.

== Background ==
Garrix premiered the song during the first show of his fifth Ushuaïa Ibiza residency on the evening of 4 July 2019. At the following day, the popular fan page Martin Garrix Hub, dedicated to the DJ, posted on Twitter the following message: "Martin Garrix premiered brand new music last night during his first post injury show at Ushuaia Ibiza. This song is apparently called 'These Are The Times' and it features the vocals of JRM."

Jaramye Jael Daniels, known under the name of JRM, is a Jamaican singer and songwriter who works in Los Angeles. He collaborated with multiple artists but he hasn't yet really met with great success. His collaboration with Garrix is probably his biggest work yet.

On 13 July, Martin Garrix Hub posted on Twitter a footage of the track, saying "New music!" with the hashtag #TheseAreTheTimes. On 15 July, Garrix announced the release on Instagram with the following message : "wohooo excited to let you know These Are The Times with @jamaicanjerm will be out on Thursday (2 PM CEST / 8 AM EDT)!!"

During an interview for Spanish daily newspaper La Vanguardia on 6 September 2019, Garrix said: ""These Are the Times" is about living in the moment and not being afraid to seize the opportunities, because they can become the best moments of your life. [...] I had a lot of fun doing these songs. It was great to be able to collaborate with JRM. This summer, when I was in Ushuaia, I played "These Are the Times" and people went crazy. It was a pass."

== Critical reception ==
The song was first compared to Avicii's style, testifying to the proximity of his tunes. According to Matthew Meadow from Your EDM, "These Are the Times" is more simple than other Garrix productions because there is just a basic melody for most of the track. He noted that JRM's vocals are pretty much unprocessed and the drop is used three times over the duration. Nick Yopko from EDM.com indicated that there are "uplifting vocals alongside another catchy, main stage-friendly melody". Kat Bein from Billboard described the track as "a light-hearted tune full of softly-energizing melodies and inspirational lyrics from JRM". According to her the song is endowed with a "heart-sparkle vibe". Writing for Dancing Astronaut, Ross Goldenberg said that Garrix "lengthens his comprehensive archive of summer offerings". Brian Bonavoglia from DJ Times thought that the song is "a colorful and euphoric tune" and "a feel-good anthem". Valentin Malfroy from French website aficia described the track as "a melodic pop anthem song, light and summery". Marie from DJ Mag Germany called the song "a poppy future house number".

== Music video ==
The official music video of the song was released at the same day through Martin Garrix's YouTube channel. It marks a collaboration with AXE Music in a new campaign of the brand with which Garrix collaborated for the first time on "Burn Out" in September 2018. The video clip looks like the song, with a summer fragrance and a cameo from Garrix himself. A couple are seen tied together by a very long headphone cable and they are seen following them around the city. It shows the act of sharing headphones, in order to do a link with music.

== Credits and personnel ==
Credits adapted from Tidal.

- Martin Garrix – production, composition, lyrics, recording engineering
- Jaramye Daniels – composition, lyrics, vocals
- Brandon Green – composition, lyrics
- Giorgio Tuinfort – composition, lyrics
- Rob Bekhuis – vocal engineering

== Charts ==
Chart (2019)	Peak position
Belgium (Ultratip Bubbling Under Wallonia)	29
Belgium Dance (Ultratop Wallonia)	23
Netherlands (Dutch Top 40)	26
New Zealand Hot Singles (RMNZ)	25
Sweden Heatseeker (Sverigetopplistan)	14
US Hot Dance/Electronic Songs (Billboard)	22
