= Higher Ground (Martin Garrix song) =

2020 song by Martin Garrix

Single by Martin Garrix featuring John Martin
- Released: 14 May 2020
- Genre: Progressive house
- Length: 3:26
- Label: Stmpd; Epic Amsterdam; Sony Netherlands
- Songwriters: Albin Nedler; John Martin; Kristoffer Fogelmark; Martijn Garritsen; Michel Zitron
- Producer: Martin Garrix

Martin Garrix singles chronology
"Drown" (2020)	"Higher Ground" (2020)	"Pressure" (2021)

John Martin singles chronology
"Whiskey and Cola" (2019)	"Higher Ground" (2020)	"Cry" (2020)

Music video
- "Higher Ground" on YouTube

"Higher Ground" is a song recorded by Dutch DJ and record producer Martin Garrix, featuring Swedish singer and songwriter John Martin. The song was released on the former's birthday, 14 May 2020.

== Background ==
Garrix played it during his live stream from his home in Amsterdam. ‘Higher Ground’ described the story of going through hard times but finding your way back up and eventually feeling happy and alive again.

== Music video ==
The video was uploaded on May 14, 2020, which was made with the help of fans from all over the world.

== Charts ==
=== Weekly charts ===
Chart (2020)	Peak position
Belgium (Ultratip Bubbling Under Flanders)	1
Belgium (Ultratip Bubbling Under Wallonia)	20
Hungary (Rádiós Top 40)	30
Netherlands (Dutch Top 40)	24
Netherlands (Single Top 100)	68
Sweden (Sverigetopplistan)	80
US Hot Dance/Electronic Songs (Billboard)	11

=== Year-end charts ===
Chart (2020)	Position
Hungary (Rádiós Top 40)	97
Netherlands (Dutch Top 40)	96
US Hot Dance/Electronic Songs (Billboard)	89

== Certifications ==
Region	Certification	Certified units/sales
Brazil (Pro-Música Brasil)	Gold	20,000^{‡}
^{‡} Sales+streaming figures based on certification alone.
