= Julian Jordan =

Dutch DJ and record producer (born 1995)

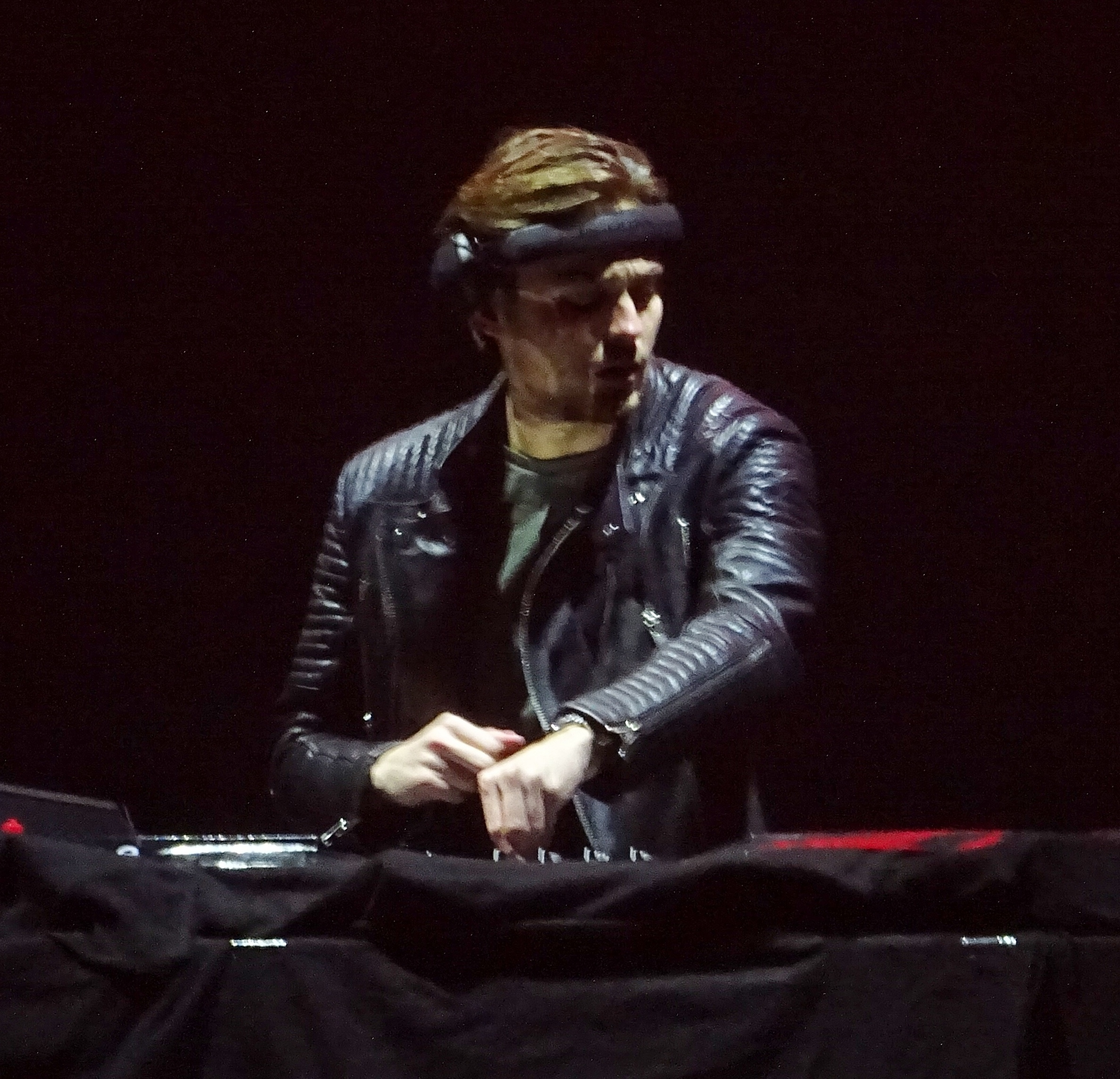
- Julian Jordan (2017)

Background information
- Born: Julian Dobbenberg; 20 August 1995 (age 31); Apeldoorn, Netherlands
- Origin: Amsterdam, Netherlands
- Genres: Dutch house; electro house; bass house; progressive house; big room house; future house; future bounce; dance-pop
- Occupations: DJ; record producer
- Years active: 2012–present
- Labels: STMPD RCRDS; Goldkid; Armada; Spinnin'; Revealed

Julian Dobbenberg (born 20 August 1995), known professionally as Julian Jordan, is a Dutch DJ, remixer, and record producer from Apeldoorn. He is best known for the songs "Kangaroo" with Sander van Doorn and "BFAM" with Martin Garrix.

== Life and career ==
As a child, Dobbenberg developed a passion for music. At the age of five, he took lessons at a music school and was interested in various percussion instruments. At the age of 14, he produced his first song "Yxalag" and published it on the internet. The song had attracted the attention of a few record labels. In 2012, he released the songs "Travel B" and "Lynxed" on the labels Suit Records and Plasmapool, respectively.

Before graduating from school, he signed a contract with Spinnin' Records, a then-independent Dutch record label. During this period, his music was characterized as electro and progressive house. Through Spinnin', he met and befriended Martin Garrix, who studied at Herman Brood Academy. That year, he released his debut single with Spinnin' titled "Rock Steady", after which he also named his radio program Rock Steady Radio. He was later named by MTV as an artist to watch.

On 20 August 2012, he collaborated with Sander van Doorn to release the single "Kangaroo". That year in November, he released the single "BFAM" with Garrix. The song title is an acronym for "brother from another mother". In 2013, Dobbenberg released the singles "Ramcar" and "Childish Grandpa". The latter was created in collaboration with TV Noise. In 2014, a collaboration with German DJ duo Twoloud was released. The title was called "Rockin" and the song was released on 14 February 2014.

On 16 February 2015, the song "Rage" was released as a single. It is a collaboration with Van Doorn and Dutch DJ duo Firebeatz. In May 2015, the single "Blinded By the Light" was released. Dobbenberg later released the song "Lost Words" on Spinnin' Records. In 2016, Dobbenberg announced his termination of contract with Spinnin'. He later signed with Hardwell's Revealed Recordings with his debut single with the label being titled "Pilot", which was released on 4 April 2016. "A Thousand Miles", a single released by Dobbenberg featuring singer Ruby Prophet, was his debut on his own record label Goldkid, which is an imprint of Armin van Buuren's Armada Music. Following the song, he released "Rebound" and "Midnight Dancers". Later that year, he collaborated with Garrix again to release the single "Welcome", which was included on Garrix's Seven EP and Dobbenberg's debut studio album It's Julian Jordan, which was released in December. "Find Love" was released as a single from the album.

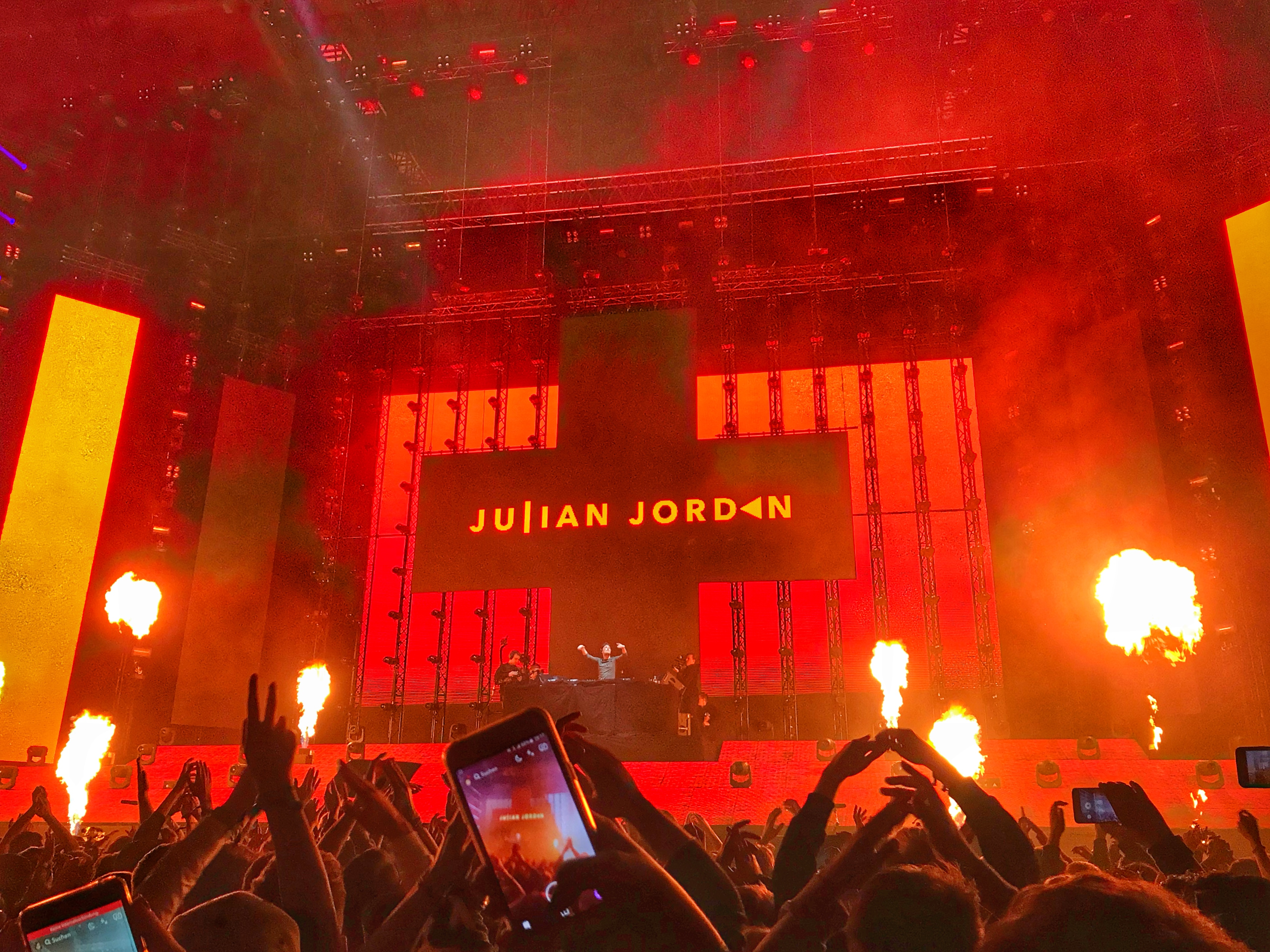
Jordan in 2017

In 2017, he released the songs "Always" and "Say Love". He also re-designed his record label "Goldkid" and released "Saint" and "Chinook" as singles. In September that year, he released the song "Night of the Crowd" as a collaboration with Steff Da Campo. Another single was released that year titled "Light Years Away", which was recorded with TYMEN. He was placed 94th on the 2017 DJ Mag Top 100 DJs poll. He became a resident DJ at Omnia at Caesars Palace.

== Discography ==
=== Extended plays ===
List of extended plays
Title	Details
Goldkid	Released: 15 June 2018; Labels: Goldkid; Formats: Digital download, CD
Hyper House	Released: 27 May 2022; Labels: Stmpd; Formats: Digital download, CD

=== Singles ===
List of singles, with selected peak chart positions
Title	Year	Peak chart positions
Title	Year	US Dance
"Colette"	2011	—
"Rock Steady"	2012	—
"Oxford" (with TV Noise)	2012	—
"Kangaroo" (with Sander van Doorn)	2012	43
"Bfam" (with Martin Garrix)	2012	—
"Ramcar"	2013	—
"Aztec"	2013	—
"Up in This!"	2014	—
"Slenderman"	2014	—
"Rockin" (with twoloud)	2014	—
"Angels x Demons"	2014	—
"The Takedown"	2015	—
"Blinded by the Light"	2015	—
"Lost Words"	2015	—
"Feel The Power" (with Stino)	2015	—
"All Night"	2016	—
"Pilot"	2016	—
"Rebound"	2016	—
"A Thousand Miles" (featuring Ruby Prophet)	2016	—
"Midnight Dancers"	2016	—
"Memory"	2016	—
"Welcome" (with Martin Garrix)	2016	—
"Always" (with Choco)	2017	—
"Say Love" (with SJ)	2017	—
"Saint"	2017	—
"Chinook"	2017	—
"Light Years Away" (with Tymen)	2017	—
"Ghost"	2018	—
"Zero Gravity" (with Alpharock)	2018	—
"Attention" (with Timmy Trumpet)	2018	—
"Never Tired of You"	2018	—
"Tell Me The Truth"	2018	—
"Glitch" (with Martin Garrix)	2018	―
"Backfire" (with Seth Hills)	2019	―
"Oldskool"	2019	―
"To the Wire"	2019	―
"Bassline"	2019	―
"Next Level"	2019	―
"Oh Lord" (with Daijo)	2020	―
"Love You Better" (featuring Kimberly Fransens)	2020	―
"Destination"	2020	―
"Without You" (with Brooks)	2020	―
"Nobody Knows"	2020	―
"Badboy" (featuring Titus)	2020	―
"Boss"	2020	—
"Big Bad Bass"	2021	―
"Let Me Be the One" (with Guy Arthur)	2021	―
"The Box" (with Will K)	2021	―
"Drop The Top"	2021	―
"Hyper"	2021	―
"Diamonds" (with Martin Garrix and Tinie Tempah)	2021	—
"Thunder"	2021	—
"Sound Of The Bass"	2022	—
"Facts" (with Alan Shirahama)	2022	—
"Funk" (with Martin Garrix)	2022	—
"Operator" (with Arcando)	2025	—
"—" denotes a recording that did not chart or was not released.

=== Remixes ===
2012

- Lights – "Banner" (Julian Jordan Remix)
- Sander van Doorn and Mayaeni – "Nothing Inside" (Julian Jordan Remix)
- Labyrinth – "Treatment" (Julian Jordan Remix)
- DJ Fresh featuring RaVaughn – "The Feeling" (Julian Jordan Remix)
- Neil Davidge – "To Galaxy" (Julian Jordan & Sander van Doorn Remix)
- Matt Nash and Dave Silcox – "Praise You" (Julian Jordan Remix)

2017

- Armin van Buuren - This Is A Test (Julian Jordan Remix)
- Martin Garrix featuring Troye Sivan – "There for You" (Julian Jordan Remix)

2018

- LNY TNZ featuring Laurell & Mann – "After Midnight" (Julian Jordan Remix)

2019

- Martin Garrix and Matisse & Sadko featuring Michel Zitron – "Hold On" (Julian Jordan Remix)

2020

- NOTD and Nina Nesbitt - "Cry Dancing" (Julian Jordan Remix)

2022

- Illenium and Said the Sky - "I See You" (Julian Jordan Remix)
