= Now That I've Found You =

Now That I've Found You may refer to:

- Now That I've Found You: A Collection, an album by Allison Krauss, 1995
- "Now That I've Found You" (song), by Martin Garrix, 2016
- "Now That I've Found You", a song by Liam Gallagher from Why Me? Why Not., 2019

== See also ==
- "Baby Now That I've Found You", a 1967 song by the Foundations
- Now That I Found You (disambiguation)
