= Burn Out (Martin Garrix and Justin Mylo song) =

Single by Martin Garrix and Justin Mylo featuring Dewain Whitmore
- Released: 14 September 2018
- Genre: Electro house
- Length: 3:37
- Label: Stmpd; Epic Amsterdam; Sony Netherlands
- Songwriters: Martijn Garritsen; Emilio Behr; Dewain Whitmore; Ilsey Juber
- Producers: Martin Garrix; Justin Mylo

Martin Garrix singles chronology
| "High on Life" (2018) | "Burn Out" (2018) | "Breach (Walk Alone)" (2018) |

Justin Mylo singles chronology
| "Funky Freddy" (2018) | "Burn Out" (2018) | "Rave Alert" (2018) |

Dewain Whitmore singles chronology
| "Almost Home" (2018) | "Burn Out" (2018) | "Crazy" (2018) |

Music video
- "Burn Out" on YouTube

"Burn Out" is a song by Dutch DJs and record producers Martin Garrix and Justin Mylo. It features American singer Dewain Whitmore and was released on 14 September 2018, via Garrix's Netherland-based record label Stmpd Rcrds, and exclusively licensed to Epic Amsterdam, a division of Sony Music.

== Background ==
"Burn Out" is the second released collaboration of Garrix and Mylo, the first being "Bouncybob". It was first premiered at Ultra Music Festival in Miami in March 2017. Billboard described the song as a "fun and flirty end-of-summer jam with an uplifting dance-pop hook and a funky synth line." It suggested that the song may be "big enough" for a music festival performance and "cute enough" as music for listening with friends during a prolonged drive. The single's release follows the launch of a new platform that is a partnership between Garrix and Axe. Garrix said "I am very honored to be part of the AXE Music platform roll out. I love the campaigns AXE has done in the past and when we all met in my studio, I felt a great connection, which is super important for me in collaborations like this. I am super happy with the result of the video for my new single "Burn Out"."

== Music video ==
In the music video, the male protagonist is seen crushing in a laundry room on a girl who is his love interest, before going into different portals that have separate themes resembling the "wild realities in his mind" and eventually gaining confidence to talk to her. Martin Garrix makes a brief appearance in the video.

== Charts ==
=== Weekly charts ===
| Chart (2018–2020) | Peak position |
|---|---|
| Austria (Ö3 Austria Top 40) | 55 |
| Czech Republic Singles Digital (ČNS IFPI) | 61 |
| Germany (GfK) | 90 |
| Hungary (Rádiós Top 40) | 8 |
| Hungary (Stream Top 40) | 39 |
| Mexico Airplay (Billboard) | 33 |
| Netherlands (Single Top 100) | 52 |
| New Zealand Hot Singles (RMNZ) | 22 |
| Norway (VG-lista) | 34 |
| Romania (Airplay 100) | 89 |
| Slovakia Airplay (ČNS IFPI) | 27 |
| Slovakia Singles Digital (ČNS IFPI) | 75 |
| Sweden (Sverigetopplistan) | 64 |
| Switzerland (Schweizer Hitparade) | 67 |
| US Hot Dance/Electronic Songs (Billboard) | 26 |

=== Year-end charts ===
| Chart (2020) | Position |
|---|---|
| Hungary (Rádiós Top 40) | 51 |

== Certifications ==
| Region | Certification | Certified units/sales |
|---|---|---|
| Brazil (Pro-Música Brasil) | Platinum | 40,000^{‡} |
| Mexico (AMPROFON) | Gold | 30,000^{‡} |
^{‡} Sales+streaming figures based on certification alone.
