= Summer Days (Martin Garrix song) =

2019 song by Martin Garrix featuring Macklemore and Patrick Stump

Single by Martin Garrix featuring Macklemore and Patrick Stump
- Released: 25 April 2019
- Genre: EDM; pop rap; dance pop; hip house; electro house; electropop
- Length: 2:43
- Label: Stmpd; Epic Amsterdam; Sony Netherlands
- Songwriters: Benjamin Hammond Haggerty; Martijn Garritsen; Brian Lee; Jaramye Daniels
- Producer: Martin Garrix

Martin Garrix singles chronology
"Mistaken" (2019)	"Summer Days" (2019)	"These Are the Times" (2019)

Macklemore singles chronology
"I Don't Belong in This Club" (2019)	"Summer Days" (2019)	"Shadow" (2019)

Patrick Stump singles chronology
"San Diego" (2016)	"Summer Days" (2019)	"Same Drugs" (2019)

"Summer Days" is a song by Dutch DJ and record producer Martin Garrix, featuring American rapper Macklemore and singer Patrick Stump of Fall Out Boy. The song was released on 25 April 2019. The music video for the song was released on 22 May 2019.

== Background ==
On 20 April 2019, Garrix, Macklemore and Stump all simultaneously shared a picture with the caption "I got this feeling on a Summer day" on their social media. The collaboration was officially confirmed by Garrix two days later. Garrix teased the release by posting a snippet of the song. Kat Bein of Billboard described the collaboration as "a cross-genre-sing-along".

== Charts ==
=== Weekly charts ===
Chart (2019)	Peak position
Australia (ARIA)	47
Austria (Ö3 Austria Top 40)	13
Belgium (Ultratop 50 Flanders)	19
Belgium (Ultratop 50 Wallonia)	10
Canada Hot 100 (Billboard)	37
Czech Republic Airplay (ČNS IFPI)	43
Czech Republic Singles Digital (ČNS IFPI)	7
Finland (Suomen virallinen lista)	19
France (SNEP)	26
Germany (GfK)	24
Greece (IFPI)	19
Hungary (Single Top 40)	32
Hungary (Stream Top 40)	6
Ireland (IRMA)	8
Italy (FIMI)	98
Latvia (LAIPA)	7
Lithuania (AGATA)	6
Netherlands (Dutch Top 40)	15
Netherlands (Single Top 100)	14
New Zealand Hot Singles (RMNZ)	12
Norway (VG-lista)	15
Poland Airplay (ZPAV)	62
Portugal (AFP)	53
Scottish Singles Sales (Official Charts)	82
Slovakia Airplay (ČNS IFPI)	48
Slovakia Singles Digital (ČNS IFPI)	5
Slovenia (SloTop50)	24
South Korea (Gaon)	142
Sweden (Sverigetopplistan)	34
Switzerland (Schweizer Hitparade)	22
UK Singles (Official Charts)	26
Ukraine Airplay (TopHit)	7
US Billboard Hot 100	100
US Dance Club Songs (Billboard)	7
US Hot Dance/Electronic Songs (Billboard)	4
US Pop Airplay (Billboard)	28
US Rolling Stone Top 100	81

=== Year-end charts ===
Chart (2019)	Position
Austria (Ö3 Austria Top 40)	54
Belgium (Ultratop Flanders)	67
Belgium (Ultratop Wallonia)	64
Canada (Canadian Hot 100)	94
France (SNEP)	107
Germany (Official German Charts)	95
Latvia (LAIPA)	41
Netherlands (Dutch Top 40)	64
Netherlands (Single Top 100)	51
Switzerland (Schweizer Hitparade)	61
US Hot Dance/Electronic Songs (Billboard)	14

== Certifications ==
Certifications for "Summer Days"
Region	Certification	Certified units/sales
Australia (ARIA)	Gold	35,000^{‡}
Austria (IFPI Austria)	Gold	15,000^{‡}
Belgium (BRMA)	Gold	20,000^{‡}
Brazil (Pro-Música Brasil)	3× Platinum	120,000^{‡}
Canada (Music Canada)	2× Platinum	160,000^{‡}
Denmark (IFPI Danmark)	Gold	45,000^{‡}
France (SNEP)	Diamond	333,333^{‡}
Germany (BVMI)	Gold	200,000^{‡}
Italy (FIMI)	Gold	25,000^{‡}
Mexico (AMPROFON)	3× Platinum	180,000^{‡}
New Zealand (RMNZ)	Platinum	30,000^{‡}
Poland (ZPAV)	Platinum	20,000^{‡}
Portugal (AFP)	Gold	5,000^{‡}
Spain (Promusicae)	Gold	30,000^{‡}
Switzerland (IFPI Switzerland)	Gold	10,000^{‡}
United Kingdom (BPI)	Gold	400,000^{‡}
United States (RIAA)	Platinum	1,000,000^{‡}
^{‡} Sales+streaming figures based on certification alone.
