= High on Life (song) =

Single by Martin Garrix featuring Bonn
- Released: 29 July 2018
- Genre: Progressive house Big room house
- Length: 3:50
- Label: STMPD; Epic Amsterdam; Sony Netherlands
- Songwriters: Martijn Garritsen; Giorgio Tuinfort; Kristoffer Fogelmark; Albin Nedler
- Producers: Matisse & Sadko; Martin Garrix; Giorgio Tuinfort

Martin Garrix singles chronology
"Ocean" (2018)	"High on Life" (2018)	"Burn Out" (2018)

"High on Life" is a song by Dutch DJ and record producer Martin Garrix. A progressive house ballad featuring Swedish songwriter and vocalist Kristoffer "Bonn" Fogelmark, it was released via Garrix's STMPD RCRDS label, which is exclusively-licensed to a Sony Music sublabel, Epic Amsterdam. The song's production credits consist of frequent Garrix collaborators Matisse & Sadko, Albin Nedler and established producer Giorgio Tuinfort, who has produced multiple songs with Garrix.

== Background ==
Garrix's label had announced via Twitter the song would be immediately available for release "the moment (Garrix) plays it at #Tomorrowland" during his headlining closing performance. It was premiered at the Tomorrowland 2018 music festival in Belgium as the closing song on 29 July 2018. It was also released at midnight on the same day.

"High on Life" is one of the two songs announced by Garrix for release since his last single "Ocean" with Khalid, the other being a collaboration with Justin Mylo that would be released in September.

The song has been played at the circuit after the 2021 Abu Dhabi Grand Prix where Garrix’s friend Max Verstappen secured his first Formula One World Championship title, the 2023 Austrian Grand Prix and the 2023 Las Vegas Grand Prix, the latter two races were also won by Verstappen.

== Production ==
The song has been musically compared to Garrix's previous singles such as "Dragon", "Lions in the Wild" and "Forever", as an "energetic and emotion-filled progressive house track". The song is noted as a "return to his roots" in reference to Garrix's regular crossover musical style of pop music to his typical big room house and progressive house.

Described as an uplifting summer song that is a "synth-heavy festival house tune", the song's production has been compared to the style of late Swedish DJ Avicii, who had worked with Garrix for the song "Waiting for Love".

== Music video ==
The music video for the song has also been released, featuring clips from Garrix's Tomorrowland performance which shows "the most standard and spectacular face of Tomorrowland". It was released to YouTube and streaming platforms five minutes after the performance at Tomorrowland ended.

== Personnel ==
Credits adapted from Tidal.

- Martijn Garritsen – production, composing, songwriting, performer
- Matisse & Sadko – production
- Kristoffer Fogelmark – composing, songwriting, vocals
- Albin Nedler – composing, songwriting, backing vocals
- Giorgio Tuinfort – composing, songwriting

== Charts ==
=== Weekly charts ===
Chart (2018)	Peak position
Australia (ARIA)	59
Austria (Ö3 Austria Top 40)	52
Belgium (Ultratip Bubbling Under Flanders)	1
Belgium Dance (Ultratop Flanders)	19
Belgium (Ultratip Bubbling Under Wallonia)	1
Belgium Dance (Ultratop Wallonia)	16
Canada Hot 100 (Billboard)	82
Croatia (HRT)	89
Czech Republic Airplay (ČNS IFPI)	56
Czech Republic Singles Digital (ČNS IFPI)	37
France (SNEP)	131
Germany (GfK)	66
Greece International (IFPI)	76
Hungary (Single Top 40)	31
Hungary (Stream Top 40)	38
Ireland (IRMA)	65
Lithuania (AGATA)	54
Netherlands (Dutch Top 40)	12
Netherlands (Single Top 100)	19
Netherlands (Dutch Dance Top 30)	6
New Zealand Hot Singles (RMNZ)	11
Portugal (AFP)	94
Romania (Airplay 100)	74
Slovakia Singles Digital (ČNS IFPI)	35
Sweden (Sverigetopplistan)	29
Switzerland (Schweizer Hitparade)	45
UK Dance (OCC)	25
US Hot Dance/Electronic Songs (Billboard)	16

=== Year-end charts ===
Chart (2018)	Position
Netherlands (Dutch Top 40)	59
Netherlands (Single Top 100)	62
US Hot Dance/Electronic Songs (Billboard)	54
Chart (2019)	Position
Netherlands (Dutch Top 40)	90

== Certifications ==
Region	Certification	Certified units/sales
Brazil (Pro-Música Brasil)	2× Platinum	80,000^{‡}
Canada (Music Canada)	Gold	40,000^{‡}
Denmark (IFPI Danmark)	Gold	45,000^{‡}
France (SNEP)	Gold	100,000^{‡}
Italy (FIMI)	Gold	25,000^{‡}
Mexico (AMPROFON)	Platinum	60,000^{‡}
New Zealand (RMNZ)	Gold	15,000^{‡}
Poland (ZPAV)	Platinum	20,000^{‡}
Portugal (AFP)	Gold	5,000^{‡}
Spain (Promusicae)	Platinum	60,000^{‡}
United Kingdom (BPI)	Silver	200,000^{‡}
^{‡} Sales+streaming figures based on certification alone.
