= Dewain Whitmore Jr. =

American singer-songwriter

Dewain Whitmore
- Born: Dewain Whitmore Jr.
- Origin: Kansas City, Missouri, United States
- Genres: Pop, R&B, Hip-hop, house, country
- Occupations: Songwriter, singer, vocal producer
- Instruments: Vocals, piano, drums
- Years active: 2010–present

Dewain Whitmore Jr. is an American singer, songwriter, and vocal producer based in Los Angeles, California. Signed to Disney Music Publishing, he has worked with numerous popular acts, including Chris Brown, Kacey Musgraves, Nick Jonas, David Guetta, Tiësto, DNCE, Martin Garrix, Khalid, 21 Savage, Usher, Kelly Clarkson, Zara Larsson, Jason Desrouleaux, Joji, The Wanted, Mary J. Blige, James Blunt, BoA, and Exo amongst others. His works have accumulated over 30 million in sales.

== Early life ==
Born and raised in Kansas City, Missouri, Whitmore was exposed to many styles of music at an early age. Growing up on a very special blend of musical influences stretching from Smokey Robinson, Lionel Richie, Stevie Wonder, Kim Burrell, and J.Moss all the way to Michael McDonald, Kenny Loggins, Toto, Hall and Oates, Billy Joel, James Taylor and Steely Dan, his inspiration is one big nostalgic melting pot.

== Music career ==
=== Major breakthrough ===
Whitmore's big break came in 2011, after re-locating to Los Angeles. After one year of being in LA, Whitmore was introduced to Chris Brown, who recorded two of his songs, "Up To You" and "Should've Kissed You", which featured on Brown's fourth studio album F.A.M.E.. The album reached No. 1 in 3 countries, and sold over 2 million copies worldwide. The album earned a nomination at the 54th Grammy Awards, for Best R&B Album. F.A.M.E. won in the Best R&B Album category. That same year, Whitmore vocal produced Kelly Clarkson's first single "Mr. Know It All" from her studio album Stronger, The album Stronger went on to win Best Pop Vocal Album at the 55th Grammy Awards. In November 2011, Whitmore collaborated with Mary J.Blige, on the song "You Want This", which was included on Bliges’ 10th studio album My Life II... The Journey Continues (Act 1). The album was certified gold, selling over 500,000 copies.

=== Notable work ===
On June 29, 2012, Chris Brown released his Billboard No. 1 album Fortune. Whitmore wrote three songs on the album, including "Stuck On Stupid", "Party Hard" and "Free Run". The album earned a nomination at the 55th Grammy Awards, for Best Urban Contemporary Album The album also reached No. 1 in 5 countries.

The next year, Whitmore reached more commercial success, with collaborations with Usher, Ciara, The Wanted and once again Chris Brown. Co-writing the single and title track "X" (#98 Billboard Hot 100), from Browns' sixth studio album X, which reached No. 1 on the Billboard US Top R&B/Hip Hop Albums and No. 2 on the US Billboard 200. The album would go on to be nominated for Best Urban Contemporary Album at the 57th Annual Grammy Awards.

In 2015, Whitmore teamed up with frequent collaborator Brown on his 7th studio album titled Royalty, co-writing three songs. The album reached No. 1 on the Billboard US Top R&B/Hip Hop Albums chart and No. 2 on the US Billboard 200 chart. That same year, Whitmore collaborated with K-pop group EXO on their album EXODUS. The album topped Billboard's World Albums Chart on the issue date of April 18, 2015, and stayed in the top 10 for six consecutive weeks.

On June 15, 2018, Martin Garrix released his new single "Ocean" featuring Khalid, which was co-written by Whitmore. The single reached No. 1 at US dance radio, No. 5 on Billboard US Hot Dance/Electronic Songs, and Top 10 Billboard US Dance Club Songs. Whitmore continued his dance success with another collaboration with Garrix and fellow Dutch DJ Justin Mylo, on the single "Burn Out". The track was co-written and features vocals from Whitmore, and reached No. 26 at Billboard US Hot Dance/Electronic Songs.

=== Featured artist ===
In 2018, Whitmore made his debut as a recording artist with his vocals featuring on the Martin Garrix dance hit “Burn Out”, which Whitmore also co-wrote. The song went on to chart in 13 different countries, becoming his first Billboard US Dance/Electronic song to chart Top 40 as an artist. With his vocals becoming more in demand, in 2020, he penned and featured on German DJ duo, Gamper & Dadoni's “Perfect (For Somebody Else)”, and the following year, his collaborations with Country music star Kacey Musgraves, led to Whitmore co-writing and singing on Musgraves’ chart topping album, Star-Crossed. Whitmore lent his vocals to “What Doesn’t Kill Me”, prominently heard on the intro and all throughout the song, becoming his first credited vocal on a #1 Country Album. In April, 2022, Whitmore found himself teaming up again with Garrix for another feature on the spring single, “Find You”, included on Garrix’s album “Sentio”. Whitmore continued his dance success in 2023 by collaborating with famed Dutch DJ Tiësto on his single “BOTH”, featuring Bia & 21 Savage. The track was co-written and features vocals from Whitmore, and was released on Atlantic on September 1, 2023.

== Selected discography ==
Year	Artist	Title	Album	Label	Credited as
2010	Jessica Mauboy	"Fight For You"	Get 'Em Girls	Sony	Writer
2010	Jessica Mauboy	"Here For Me"	Get 'Em Girls	Sony	Writer
2011	Chris Brown	"Up To You"	F.A.M.E.	Jive	Writer
2011	Chris Brown	"Should've Kissed You"	F.A.M.E.	Jive	Writer
2011	Mary J. Blige	"You Want This"	My Life II... The Journey Continues (Act 1)	Geffen	Writer
2011	Kelly Clarkson	"Mr. Know It All"	Stronger	RCA	Vocal Producer
2012	Jackson Guthy	"One Of These Days"	—N/a	RCA	Writer/Vocal Producer
2012	Chris Brown	"Stuck On Stupid"	Fortune	RCA	Writer
2012	Chris Brown	"Party Hard / Cadillac (Interlude)"	Fortune	RCA	Writer
2012	Chris Brown	"Free Run"	Fortune	RCA	Writer
2013	Jessica Sanchez	"You've Got The Love"	Me, You & the Music	Interscope	Writer
2013	The Wanted	"Running Out Of Reasons"	Word of Mouth	Island	Writer
2013	Ciara	"Backseat Love"	Ciara	Epic	Writer
2013	TGT	"Between The Lines"	Three Kings	Atlantic	Writer
2013	Jay Sean	"Worth It All"	Neon	Republic	Writer
2013	Jay Sean	"Guns and Roses"	Neon	Republic	Writer
2014	Chris Brown	"X"	X	RCA	Writer
2014	Chris Brown	"Stereotype"	X	RCA	Writer
2014	TVXQ	"Smoky Heart"	Spellbound	S.M. Entertainment	Writer
2014	Usher	"Clueless"	—N/a	RCA	Writer
2015	Tamar Braxton	"Coming Home"	Calling All Lovers	Epic	Writer
2015	Jordin Sparks	"Tell Him That I Love Him"	Right Here Right Now	19 Recordings	Writer
2015	BoA	"Home"	Kiss My Lips	S.M. Entertainment	Writer
2015	Exo	"What If..."	Exodus	S.M. Entertainment	Writer
2015	Chris Brown	"No Filter"	Royalty	CBE, RCA	Writer
2015	Chris Brown	"Discover"	Royalty	CBE, RCA	Writer/Vocals
2015	Chris Brown	"The 80's" (International)	Royalty	CBE, RCA	Writer
2015	Chris Brown	"Counterfeit" feat. Rihanna, Wiz Khalifa	Before the Party	CBE, RCA	Writer/Vocals
2015	Chris Brown	"Second Hand Love"	Before the Party	CBE, RCA	Writer/Vocals
2015	Chris Brown	"The Breakup"	Before the Party	CBE, RCA	Writer/Vocals
2015	Chris Brown	"Roses Turn Blue"	Before the Party	CBE, RCA	Writer/Vocals
2015	Shinee	"Love Sick"	Odd	S.M. Entertainment	Writer
2015	TVXQ	"Apology"	Rise as God	S.M. Entertainment	Writer
2016	Nick Jonas	"Voodoo"	Last Year Was Complicated	Island, Safehouse	Writer
2016	Nick Jonas	"The Difference"	Last Year Was Complicated	Island, Safehouse	Writer/Vocals
2016	DNCE	"Almost"	DNCE	Republic	Writer
2016	DNCE	"Unsweet"	DNCE	Republic	Writer
2016	Shinee	"Tell Me What To Do"	1 of 1	S.M. Entertainment	Writer
2016	Taeyeon	"Hands On Me"	Why	S.M. Entertainment	Writer
2016	Kevin Hart	"Sunday Morning"	Kevin Hart: What Now? (The Mixtape Presents Chocolate Droppa)	Motown	Writer
2016	Jordan Fisher	"Lookin' Like That"	Jordan Fisher	Hollywood Records	Writer
2016	Rockie Fresh feat. Chris Brown	"Call Me When It's Over"	The Night I Went To... Los Angeles	Maybach Music Group	Writer
2017	James Blunt	"Heartbeat"	The Afterlove	Atlantic UK	Writer
2017	Jordan Fisher	"Alway's Summer"	Non-album single	Hollywood Records	Writer
2017	Jordan Fisher	"Mess"	Non-album single	Hollywood Records	Writer
2017	Daley	"Second To None"	The Spectrum	BMG	Writer
2017	Sevyn Streeter	"Peace Sign"	Girl Disrupted	Atlantic	Writer
2017	NCT 127	"Limitless"	Limitless	S.M. Entertainment	Writer
2017	Exo	"Diamond"	The War	S.M. Entertainment	Writer
2017	Natasha Bedingfield	"More Of Me"	—N/a	Walt Disney Records	Writer
2018	Exo-CBX	"Vroom Vroom"	Blooming Days	S.M. Entertainment	Writer
2018	Martin Garrix ft. Khalid	"Ocean"	—N/a	Stmpd, Sony	Writer
2018	Vindata ft. R.LUM.R	"Emotion"	Non-album single	PRMD Music	Writer
2018	NCT 127	"Limitless"	Chain	Avex Trax	Writer
2018	Gospellers	"In This Room"	What The World Needs Now	Ki/oon Music, Sony	Writer
2018	Daughtry	"Gravity"	Cage to Rattle	RCA	Writer
2018	Martin Garrix & Justin Mylo	"Burn Out"	—N/a	Stmpd	Writer/Vocals
2018	New Hope Club	"Crazy"	Welcome to the Club Pt.2 EP	Hollywood Records	Writer
2018	Martin Garrix	"Breach (Walk Alone)" (with Blinders)	—N/a	Stmpd	Writer
2018	Exo	"Sign"	Don't Mess Up My Tempo	S.M. Entertainment	Writer
2018	Red Velvet	"Butterflies"	RBB	S.M. Entertainment	Writer
2019	Backstreet Boys	"Said I Love You"	DNA	RCA	Writer
2019	Jorge Blanco	"Beautiful Mistake"	Conmigo	Hollywood Records	Writer
2019	Jordan McGraw ft. T-Pain	"Flexible"	Non-album single	Empire Distribution	Writer
2019	Chris Brown	"Troubled Waters"	Indigo	RCA	Writer
2019	Mika Setzer	"Shook"	Non-album single	RCA	Writer
2019	Mario (Devon version)	"Cruise"	Empire (Season 6, Stronger Than My Rival) (Music from the TV Series)	Twentieth Century Fox Film Corporation	Writer
2020	NCT 127	"Sit Down"	Neo Zone	S.M. Entertainment	Writer
2020	NCT 127	"White Night"	Neo Zone	S.M. Entertainment	Writer
2020	Gamper & Dadoni ft. Dewain Whitmore	"Perfect (For Somebody Else)"	Non-album single	Big Top Records	Writer/Vocals
2020	Georgia Ku	"Lighthouse"	Real	Atlantic Records	Writer
2020	Georgia Ku	"Real"	Real	Atlantic Records	Writer
2020	Georgia Ku	"Big Plans"	Real	Atlantic Records	Writer
2020	THEY.	"Count Me In"	"The Amanda Tape"	Avant Garden, Island Records	Writer/Vocals
2020	THEY.	"Play Fight" ft. Tinashe	"The Amanda Tape"	Avant Garden, Island Records	Writer/Vocals
2020	THEY.	"All Mine"	"The Amanda Tape"	Avant Garden, Island Records	Writer/Vocals
2020	THEY.	"STCU" ft. Juicy J	"The Amanda Tape"	Avant Garden, Island Records	Vocals
2020	THEY.	"Losing Focus" ft. Wale	"The Amanda Tape"	Avant Garden, Island Records	Vocals
2020	THEY.	"FWM"	"The Amanda Tape"	Avant Garden, Island Records	Writer/Vocals
2020	THEY.	"Mood Swings"	"The Amanda Tape"	Avant Garden, Island Records	Writer/Vocals
2020	THEY.	"Conclude"	"The Amanda Tape"	Avant Garden, Island Records	Vocals
2020	Syn Cole	"Crawl" ft. Sarah Close	Non-album single	Ultra Music	Writer
2021	Zara Larsson	"Talk About Love" (featuring Young Thug)	Poster Girl	Epic Records	Writer
2021	THEY.	"Count Me In" ft. Kiana Lede	Non-album single	Avant Garden, Island Records	Writer/Vocals
2021	Tedashii	"Light's in the City"	"Summer 21"	Reach Records	Writer
2021	Red Velvet	"Hello, Sunset"	Queendom	S.M. Entertainment	Writer
2021	Kacey Musgraves	"What Doesn't Kill Me"	Star-Crossed	MCA Nashville/Interscope	Writer/Vocals
2021	NCT 127	"Magic Carpet Ride	Sticker	S.M. Entertainment	Writer
2021	Eric Bellinger	"Goin' Dutch"	"New Light"	Empire Records	Writer
2021	Nadine Lustre & CAREFREE	"Wait for Me"	Non-album single	Hyphen Music	Writer
2022	Martin Garrix & Justin Mylo	"Find You"	Sentio	Stmpd	Writer/Vocals
2022	Joji	"Die For You"	Smithereens (2022)	88rising, Warner	Writer
2022	THEY.	"Lonely" ft. Bino Rideaux	Non-album single	Nü Religion, AWAL	Writer/Vocals
2022	Sam Feldt with Monsta X	"Late Night Feels"	Non-album single	Liquid State	Writer
2022	Chris Brown	"Hate Me Tomorrow"	Breezy	RCA Records, CBE	Writer/Vocals
2022	Chris Brown	"In The City"	Breezy	RCA Records, CBE	Writer/Vocals
2022	Jaehyun	"Forever Only"	NCT Lab	S.M. Entertainment	Writer
2022	Jay B	"The Way You Are"	Be Yourself	CDNZA Records	Writer
2022	Sam Derosa	"Sorry For Asking"	"The Good Parts" EP	Preach Records	Writer
2023	Ive	"Cherish"	I've Ive	Starship Entertainment	Writer
2023	Jason Derulo with David Guetta	"Saturday/Sunday"	Non-album single	Atlantic	Writer
2023	Tiësto with 21 Savage & Bia	"Both"	Non-album single	Atlantic	Writer
2023	Zara Larsson and David Guetta	On My Love	Venus	Sommer House, Epic	Writer
2023	Key	"CoolAs"	Good & Great	SM	Writer
2023	THEY. feat. Kacey Musgraves	"Wait On Me"	"Nü Moon	Avant Garden, Island	Writer
2023	Jihyo	"Closer"	Zone	JYP, Republic	Writer
2023	NCT 127	"Home Alone"	Be There For Me	SM	Writer
2023	James Blunt	"Confetti and Roses"	Who We Used to Be	Atlantic	Writer
2024	Robin Thicke & Stevie Matthew	"Hotel"	Non-album single	Snafu Records	Writer
2024	Chris Brown	"Residuals"	11:11	RCA Records, CBE	Writer/Vocals
2024	Riize	"Impossible"	Riizing	SM	Writer
2024	Jae Stephens	"Wet"	Non-album single	Def Jam Recordings	Writer
2024	Jae Stephens	"Body Favors"	Non-album single	Def Jam Recordings	Writer
2024	NCT 127	"Pricey"	Walk	SM Entertainment	Writer
2025	Rascal Flatts feat. Jonas Brothers	"I Dare You"	Life Is a Highway: Refueled Duets	Big Machine	Writer
2025	Chris Brown feat. Bryson Tiller	"It Depends"	—N/a	RCA Records, CBE	Writer
2025	Ciara	"Infinite Imagination"	CiCi	RCA	Writer
2025	Hearts2Hearts	"Focus"	Focus	SM Entertainment	Writer

== Grammy Awards ==
Year	Nominee / work	Award	Result
2011	Chris Brown – F.A.M.E	Best R&B Album	Won
2012	Kelly Clarkson – Stronger	Best Pop Vocal Album	Won
2012	Chris Brown – Fortune	Best Urban Contemporary Album	Nominated
2013	TGT – Three Kings	Best R&B Album	Nominated
2014	Chris Brown – X	Best Urban Contemporary Album	Nominated
