= Seven (EP) =

EP by Martin Garrix
- Released: 28 October 2016
- Genres: Progressive house; Big Room House; future house
- Length: 23:58 (standard) 29:00 (extended)
- Labels: Stmpd; Sony
- Producers: Martin Garrix; Mesto; Jay Hardway; Julian Jordan; Matisse & Sadko; Florian Picasso

Martin Garrix chronology
Break Through the Silence (2015)	Seven (2016)	Bylaw (2018)

Singles from Seven
- 1. "WIEE" Released: 15 October 2016; 2. "Sun Is Never Going Down" Released: 16 October 2016; 3. "Spotless" Released: 17 October 2016; 4. "Hold On And Believe" Released: 18 October 2016; 5. "Welcome" Released: 19 October 2016; 6. "Together" Released: 20 October 2016; 7. "Make Up Your Mind" Released: 21 October 2016

Seven is the third extended play by Dutch DJ and record producer Martin Garrix. Released on 28 October 2016, the EP was released via Stmpd Rcrds, and features collaborations with Mesto, Jay Hardway, Julian Jordan, Matisse & Sadko and Florian Picasso, as well as writing contributions from Giorgio Tuinfort among others. The tracks were issued one per day between 15 and 21 October 2016.

== Track listing ==
Seven
No.	Title	Writer(s)	Producer(s)	Length
1.	"WIEE" (with Mesto)	Martijn Gerard Garritsen; Melle Stomp	Martin Garrix; Mesto	3:23 [3:55]
2.	"Sun Is Never Going Down" (featuring Dawn Golden)	Garritsen; Dexter Tortoriello; Jem Cooke; James Bryan McCollum; Justin "SumPunk" Broad; Paul Herman	Garrix	3:24 [4:08]
3.	"Spotless" (with Jay Hardway)	Garritsen; Jobke Heiblom	Garrix; Jay Hardway	3:15 [3:42]
4.	"Hold On & Believe" (featuring The Federal Empire)	Garritsen; Tim Bergling; Chad Wolf; McKay Stevens; Keith Varon; Simon Strömstedt; Giorgio Tuinfort	Garrix	3:54 [4:42]
5.	"Welcome" (with Julian Jordan)	Garritsen; Julian Dobbenberg	Garrix; Julian Jordan	3:05 [4:06]
6.	"Together" (with Matisse & Sadko)	Garritsen; Alexander Parkhomenko; John Martin; Michel Zitron; Max McElligott; Yury Parkhomenko	Garrix; Matisse & Sadko	3:41 [4:42]
7.	"Make Up Your Mind" (with Florian Picasso)	Garritsen; Tuinfort; Florian Ruiz-Picasso	Garrix; Florian Picasso	3:16 [3:45]
Total length:				Standard: 23:58 [Expansion: 29:00]

== Charts ==
Chart (2016)	Peak position
US Top Dance Albums (Billboard)	5
