= Ocean (Martin Garrix song) =

Single by Martin Garrix featuring Khalid

from the album The Martin Garrix Experience
- Released: 15 June 2018
- Genre: Pop
- Length: 3:36
- Label: Stmpd; Epic Amsterdam; Sony Netherlands
- Songwriters: Martijn Garritsen; Khalid Robinson; Giorgio Tuinfort; Dewain Whitmore Jr.; Ilsey Juber
- Producers: Martin Garrix; Giorgio Tuinfort

Martin Garrix singles chronology
"Game Over" (2018)	"Ocean" (2018)	"High on Life" (2018)

Khalid singles chronology
"This Way" (2018)	"Ocean" (2018)	"Eastside" (2018)

Music video
- "Ocean" on YouTube

"Ocean" is a song by Dutch DJ and record producer Martin Garrix featuring American singer-songwriter Khalid, from the former's debut studio album The Martin Garrix Experience. The song was written by Khalid, Dewain Whitmore Jr., Ilsey Juber, and its producers Garrix and Giorgio Tuinfort. It was released by Stmpd Rcrds on 15 June 2018, alongside its music video.

== Background ==
In October 2017, Khalid tweeted Garrix quoting a fan who asked for a collaboration between them, Garrix responded: "Lets do it". Khalid first revealed that he was in the studio with Garrix during an interview on Billboard Music Awards' Facebook Live broadcast on 17 April 2018. Garrix later revealed more details on the song to Kenh14 News, saying: "At the moment, I can announce that I have a new song with Khalid. He is a great singer. We will release it early June. I'm really excited about it." In an interview with Sirius XM Hits 1 at the 2018 Billboard Music Awards, Garrix announced the song's title and release date. The official announcement came on 11 June, along with the single artwork.

== Music video ==
A music video for the song was released via Garrix's YouTube channel on 15 June 2018.

The video was shot in a warehouse in Hamilton, Ontario, which had no water or electricity. The production crew constructed stage lighting, LEDs and a building with glass and mirrors to go with the mood of the song. As of April 2025, the video has received over 312 million views.

== Critical reception ==
Kat Bein of Billboard felt that the track was "perfectly suited for Khalid's soulful range", who gave listeners his "alto richness and falsetto tenderness over the slow burn beat Garrix cooked". Matthew Meadow from Your EDM described "Ocean" as "the most mellow of any Garrix song we've heard thus far" which "plays more to Khalid's style than it does to his own", thus missing out on most of Garrix's signature musical style. Dancing Astronaut's Chris Stack wrote that the pair delivered a "laid back pop track blending electronic tropes with elements of rock and R&B into a soothing soundscape polished by calming harmonies", while noting the successful continuation of Khalid's "foray into EDM".

== Personnel ==
- Martin Garrix – production, mix engineering
- Khalid – vocals
- Giorgio Tuinfort – production
- Denis Kosiak – engineering, vocal production

== Charts ==
=== Weekly charts ===
Weekly chart performance
Chart (2018–2019)	Peak position
Australia (ARIA)	12
Austria (Ö3 Austria Top 40)	23
Belgium (Ultratop 50 Flanders)	42
Belgium (Ultratop 50 Wallonia)	48
Canada Hot 100 (Billboard)	28
Croatia Airplay (HRT)	22
Czech Republic Airplay (ČNS IFPI)	15
Czech Republic Singles Digital (ČNS IFPI)	12
Denmark (Tracklisten)	17
France (SNEP)	127
Germany (GfK)	38
Hungary (Single Top 40)	15
Hungary (Stream Top 40)	4
Ireland (IRMA)	14
Italy (FIMI)	78
Malaysia (RIM)	7
Netherlands (Dutch Top 40)	6
Netherlands (Single Top 100)	16
New Zealand (Recorded Music NZ)	11
Norway (VG-lista)	14
Portugal (AFP)	16
Romania (Airplay 100)	5
Scotland Singles (Official Charts)	8
Singapore (RIAS)	7
Slovakia Airplay (ČNS IFPI)	78
Slovakia Singles Digital (ČNS IFPI)	15
Spain (PROMUSICAE)	88
Sweden (Sverigetopplistan)	11
Switzerland (Schweizer Hitparade)	25
UK Singles (Official Charts)	25
US Billboard Hot 100	78
US Dance Club Songs (Billboard)	10
US Hot Dance/Electronic Songs (Billboard)	5

=== Year-end charts ===
Year-end chart performance
Chart (2018)	Position
Australia (ARIA)	62
Netherlands (Dutch Top 40)	51
Netherlands (Single Top 100)	65
Portugal (AFP)	94
Romania (Airplay 100)	44
Switzerland (Schweizer Hitparade)	99
US Hot Dance/Electronic Songs (Billboard)	16
Chart (2019)	Position
US Hot Dance/Electronic Songs (Billboard)	81

== Certifications ==
Certifications for "Ocean"
Region	Certification	Certified units/sales
Australia (ARIA)	3× Platinum	210,000^{‡}
Brazil (Pro-Música Brasil)	3× Platinum	120,000^{‡}
Canada (Music Canada)	Platinum	80,000^{‡}
Denmark (IFPI Danmark)	Platinum	90,000^{‡}
France (SNEP)	Gold	100,000^{‡}
Germany (BVMI)	Gold	200,000^{‡}
Italy (FIMI)	Gold	25,000^{‡}
Mexico (AMPROFON)	Platinum+Gold	90,000^{‡}
New Zealand (RMNZ)	2× Platinum	60,000^{‡}
Poland (ZPAV)	Platinum	20,000^{‡}
Portugal (AFP)	Platinum	10,000^{‡}
Switzerland (IFPI Switzerland)	Platinum	20,000^{‡}
United Kingdom (BPI)	Platinum	600,000^{‡}
United States (RIAA)	Platinum	1,000,000^{‡}
^{‡} Sales+streaming figures based on certification alone.
