= Bouncybob =

Single by Martin Garrix featuring Justin Mylo and Mesto
- Released: 31 December 2015
- Genre: Future bounce
- Length: 3:39 (radio edit); 4:11 (extended mix)
- Songwriters: Martjin Garritsen; Emilio Behr; Melle Stomp
- Producers: Martin Garrix; Mesto; Justin Mylo

Martin Garrix singles chronology
"Poison" (2015)	"Bouncybob" (2015)	"Now That I've Found You" (2016)

"Bouncybob" is a song by Dutch DJs and record producers Martin Garrix, Justin Mylo and Mesto. It was released as a free download on 31 December 2015.

== Music video ==
A music video to accompany the release of "Bouncybob" was first released onto YouTube on 31 December 2015 at a total length of three minutes and thirty-nine seconds. It features an animated pro DJ controller dancing to the beats of the track.

== Charts ==
Chart (2015–2016)	Peak position
Netherlands (Single Tip)	16
US Hot Dance/Electronic Songs (Billboard)	28

== Release history ==
Region	Date	Format
Netherlands	31 December 2015	Digital download
