= Justin Mylo =

Dutch musician and DJ

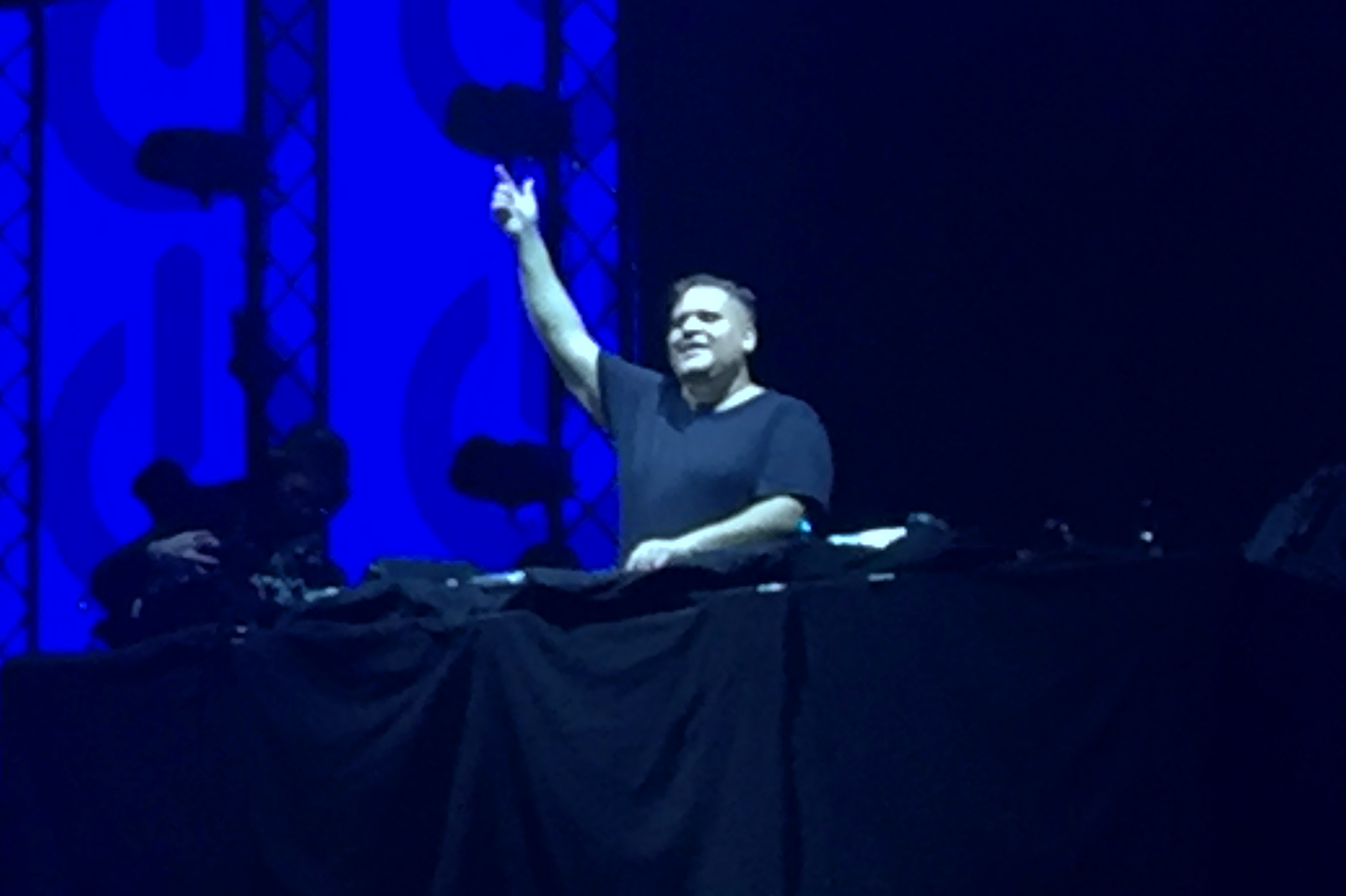

Background information
- Birth name: Emilio Justin Behr
- Born: 7 November 1995 (age 29); Amsterdam, Netherlands
- Genres: Future house; deep house; progressive house; future bounce; big room house; electro house
- Occupations: Musician; DJ; record producer
- Instrument: Programming
- Years active: 2015–present
- Labels: Musical Freedom; Spinnin' Records; Stmpd Rcrds; Revealed
- Website: justinmylo.com

Emilio Justin Behr (born 7 November 1995), better known by his stage name Justin Mylo, is a Dutch musician, DJ and record producer from Amsterdam. He gained recognition after working and collaborating with Martin Garrix on the single "Bouncybob".

== Career ==
As a teenager, he performed at local clubs as a DJ. In 2015, he was featured on Garrix's single "Bouncybob" in production alongside Mesto.

== Discography ==
=== Extended plays ===
Title	Album Details
What Am I Looking For?	Released: 18 October 2019; Label: ON / OFF; Format: Digital download

=== Singles ===
Title	Year	Peak chart positions	Album
Title	Year	US Dance	Album
"Bouncybob" (Martin Garrix featuring Justin Mylo and Mesto)	2015	28	Non-album singles
"Groovy George" (with Mike Williams)	2016	—	Non-album singles
"Jumping Jack"	2016	—	Non-album singles
"Cheap Motel"	2017	—	Non-album singles
"Paradigm"	2017	—	Non-album singles
"Chasing Shadows"	2018	—	Non-album singles
"Live Like This" (with Navarra)	2018	—	Non-album singles
"Funky Freddy" (with Rich Edwards)	2018	—	Non-album singles
"Burn Out" (with Martin Garrix featuring Dewain Whitmore)	2018	26	Non-album singles
"Rave Alert" (with Swacq)	2018	—	Non-album singles
"Not Afraid"	2019	—	Non-album singles
"Won’t Stop" (featuring Shaylen)	2019	—	Non-album singles
"More of Your Love" (with Reggio)	2019	—	Non-album singles
"Starlight"	2019	—	What Am I Looking For?
"Save My Soul"	2019	—	What Am I Looking For?
"What Am I Looking For" (with Navarra)	2019	—	What Am I Looking For?
"I Wanna Fall in Love" (featuring Raphaella)	2020	—	Non-album singles
"Forever"	2020	—	Non-album singles
"Face Up To The Sun" (with Mike Williams featuring Sara Sangfelt)	2020	—	Non-album singles
"I Remember" (featuring Strngrs)	2021	—	Non-album singles
"Do I Know Myself"	2021	—	Non-album singles
"Find You" (with Martin Garrix featuring Dewain Whitmore)	2022	49	Sentio
"—" denotes an album that did not chart or was not released.
