= Forever (Martin Garrix and Matisse & Sadko song) =

2017 single by Martin Garrix and Matisse & Sadko

Single by Martin Garrix and Matisse & Sadko
- Released: 20 October 2017
- Genre: Progressive house
- Length: 3:38
- Label: Stmpd; Epic Amsterdam; Sony Netherlands
- Songwriters: Martijn Garritsen; Alexander Parkhomenko; Yury Parkhomenko
- Producer: Martin Garrix

Martin Garrix singles chronology
"Pizza" (2017)	"Forever" (2017)	"So Far Away" (2017)

Matisse & Sadko singles chronology
"HNDZ Up" (2017)	"Forever" (2017)	"Witchcraft" (2017)

Music video
- "Forever" on YouTube

"Forever" is a song recorded by Dutch DJ and record producer Martin Garrix and Russian production duo Matisse & Sadko. It was released via Garrix's Netherlands-based record label Stmpd Rcrds, and exclusively licensed to Epic Amsterdam, a division of Sony Music, on 20 October 2017. It is the fourth collaboration between Martin Garrix and Matisse & Sadko, after "Dragon", "Break Through the Silence", and "Together".

== Background ==
Garrix and Matisse & Sadko premiered together the song at Shanghai Ultra China festival on 9 September 2017, accompanied by posting a ten-second snippet of the song on Snapchat, which was recorded during his performance. The official teaser of the song was posted by the label on Twitter two days before the release. The song was officially released one week after the Garrix's collaboration as GRX with Brooks, on the song "Boomerang", and one day before Garrix knows if he keeps his first place in the DJ Mag Top 100.

== Critical reception ==
Dancing Astronaut staff called "Forever" a melodical house collaboration. They described the song as "a well-rounded festival anthem, complete with and a dramatic organ introduction and a nostalgia-inducing melody". Kat Bein from Billboard wrote that the song starts with "heart-aching chords on a church organ" and "heavy drums echo in over uplifting guitar". In the same way she noted that the wordless vocal improves moving vibes. According to the redaction of Catalan radio Flaix FM, the intro reminds Garrix's previous song, "Pizza" but they noticed that "Pizza" has a more melodic and epic beginning. However, they indicated that there are in these two songs "the both themes, instrumental with a very similar musical structure", which is apparent to a "progressive big room genre".

== Music video ==
The official music video of the song was released at the same day through Martin Garrix's YouTube channel. It was directed, shot and edited by Damian Karsznia, accompanied by production assistants Joris Hoevenberg and Mees Roozen. (Note: According to the information provided in the description of the video on Youtube.) Shot in Scotland, it shows the road trip of Sjak van Hoof, a biker on a motorcycle. He crosses roads close to mountains and valleys, as on the cover of the single, in order to forget his loneliness.

== Charts ==
Chart performance for "Forever"
Chart (2017–2018)	Peak position
Belgium (Ultratip Bubbling Under Flanders)	16
Belgium (Ultratip Bubbling Under Wallonia)	27
Belgium Dance (Ultratop Flanders)	30
Belgium Dance (Ultratop Wallonia)	15
Netherlands (Tipparade)	11
Netherlands (Dutch Dance Top 30)	17
