= Herman Brood Academie =

The Herman Brood Academie is a vocational school in Utrecht. It is a magnet school for the technical aspects of music production. The school was founded in 2006 and provides education at the secondary vocational education level in the Dutch education system.

== Notable alumni and students ==
- Martin Garrix, DJ, producer
- Ana Maria Chipaila, DJ, Producer
- Mr. Polska, rapper
- Taymir, indie rock band
- Kid de Blits, rapper
- Mister and Mississippi, folk band
- Joan Franka, singer-songwriter
- Lisa Lois, pop singer
- Nielson, pop singer
- Rondé, band
- Sevn Alias, rapper
- Snelle, rapper
- Sub Zero Project, DJ and producer duo
- The Brahms, band
- Yade Lauren, singer
- Mesto, DJ, producer, songwriter
- Aeden, DJ, producer
- Nona
- Julian Jordan, DJ, producer
