= Now That I've Found You (song) =

Single by Martin Garrix featuring John Martin and Michel Zitron
- Released: 11 March 2016
- Genre: Progressive house
- Length: 3:12 (radio edit); 5:41 (instrumental mix); 6:15 (extended mix)
- Label: Stmpd
- Songwriters: Martin Garrix; John Martin Lindstrom; Max Anthony McElligott; Michel Zitron
- Producers: Martin Garrix; Aydin Vance; Michel Zitron

Martin Garrix singles chronology
"Bouncybob" (2015)	"Now That I've Found You" (2016)	"Lions in the Wild" (2016)

John Martin singles chronology
"Love Louder" (2014)	"Now That I`ve Found You" (2016)

Michel Zitron singles chronology
"Sweetest Heartache" (2014)	"Now I`ve Found You" (2016)	"Never Alone" (2019)

"Now That I've Found You" is a song by Dutch DJ and record producer Martin Garrix, featuring Swedish singer John Martin and record producer, singer and songwriter Michel Zitron. It was released as a digital download on 11 March 2016. A music video was later released on YouTube. This song was the first released off Martin Garrix's record label Stmpd Rcrds, and was notably later played during his closing set of Sziget Festival.

== Composition ==
"Now That I've Found You" is the vocal version of the instrumental track "Don't Crack Under Pressure". The melody of the track was created at the Dutch dance event called DanceFair 2015. The track has a tempo of 128 BPM and is composed in the F minor scale.

== Charts ==
Chart (2016)	Peak position
Austria (Ö3 Austria Top 40)	70
France (SNEP)	106
Netherlands (Single Top 100)	73
Sweden Heatseeker (Sverigetopplistan)	5
US Hot Dance/Electronic Songs (Billboard)	21
US Dance/Mix Show Airplay (Billboard)	25

== Release history ==
Region	Date	Format	Label
Worldwide	11 March 2016	Digital download	Stmpd
