= Anywhere for You (John Martin song) =

Single by John Martin
- Released: 12 February 2014
- Length: 3:33
- Label: Universal Island
- Songwriters: John Martin; Dr. Luke; Vincent Pontare; Michel Zitron; Adam Baptiste
- Producers: John Martin; Michel Zitron

John Martin singles chronology
"Children of the Sun" (2013)	"Anywhere for You" (2014)	"Love Louder" (2014)

Music video
- "Anywhere for You" on YouTube; "Anywhere for You" (remix) on YouTube

"Anywhere for You" is the debut solo single by Swedish singer-songwriter John Martin, as the lead single from his debut studio album. The song was released in Sweden as a digital download on 12 February 2014 and was released in the United Kingdom on 30 March. The song was written by John Martin, Vincent Pontare, Michel Zitron and Adam Baptiste, and produced by Martin and Zitron. The song peaked at number 38 on the Swedish Singles Chart, and number 47 in Australia.

== Background ==
John Martin co-wrote and produced with Michel Zitron. Talking to Digital Spy about the song, he said, "Michel and I wrote it on a writing trip to LA where we rented a house and spent time reflecting on how blessed we have been for doing what we love and with the incredible experiences we have had since things really took off musically for us, it's all about what is important – friends, family and lovers back home. It's what really counts in life. It's the first track off the album to be released as it's really what I'm about. It means a lot to me personally." Talking to STV's Laura Boyd about the song he said, "I’m really proud of that song. Now people really recognise my voice and the style. I already have a big fanbase before the first single comes out, so that makes it a lot easier."

== Live performances ==
On 27 March 2014, Martin performed an acoustic version of the song on Scottish independent local radio station serving Glasgow and West Central Scotland Clyde 1.

== Music video ==
A music video to accompany the release of "Anywhere for You" was first released onto YouTube on 12 February 2014 at a total length of three minutes and forty-one seconds. The start of the video shows a young couple driving a pickup truck through the countryside and Martin performing the song. It then shows the couple walking through the countryside and finding a house. As of July 2016, the video has had more than 9 million views.

A second video for the Tiësto vs. Dzeko & Torres remix of the song was first released onto YouTube on 19 March 2014 at a total length of three minutes and thirty-five seconds. The video shows scenes from John Martin's original video along with added footage of the DJs in action and lyrics. This video has received over 6 million views as of July 2016.

== Track listing ==
Digital download
No.	Title	Writer(s)	Producer	Length
1.	"Anywhere For You"	John Martin; Vincent Pontare; Michel Zitron; Adam Baptiste	Michel Zitron	3:33

Digital download - Remix EP
No.	Title	Writer(s)	Producer	Length
1.	"Anywhere For You" (Extended Mix)	John Martin; Vincent Pontare; Michel Zitron; Adam Baptiste	Michel Zitron	5:01
2.	"Anywhere For You" (Tiësto vs. Dzeko & Torres Remix)	Martin; Pontare; Zitron; Baptiste	Zitron	5:47
3.	"Anywhere For You" (Carli Remix)	Martin; Pontare; Zitron; Baptiste	Zitron	6:23
4.	"Anywhere For You" (Stuart Price Version)	Martin; Pontare; Zitron; Baptiste	Zitron	3:08
5.	"Don't You Worry Child" (Acoustic)	Axel Hedfors; Steve Angello; Sebastian Ingrosso; Martin; Zitron	Swedish House Mafia	4:16

== Charts ==
=== Weekly charts ===
Weekly chart performance for "Anywhere for You"
Chart (2014)	Peak position
Australia (ARIA)	35
Australia Dance (ARIA)	14
Belgium (Ultratip Bubbling Under Flanders)	20
CIS Airplay (TopHit)	14
Czech Republic Airplay (ČNS IFPI)	92
Hungary (Rádiós Top 40)	11
Ireland (IRMA)	34
Latvia (European Hit Radio)	1
Russia Airplay (TopHit)	14
Scotland Singles (OCC)	2
Sweden (Sverigetopplistan)	38
UK Singles (OCC)	7
UK Dance (OCC)	4
Ukraine Airplay (TopHit)	18
US Dance Club Songs (Billboard)	33
US Hot Dance/Electronic Songs (Billboard)	43

=== Year-end charts ===
2014 year-end chart performance for "Anywhere for You"
Chart (2014)	Position
Hungary (Rádiós Top 40)	76
Russia Airplay (TopHit)	84
Ukraine Airplay (TopHit)	80

== Certifications ==
Certifications for "Anywhere for You"
Region	Certification	Certified units/sales
Sweden (GLF)	Platinum	40,000^{‡}
^{‡} Sales+streaming figures based on certification alone.

== Release history ==
Release history for "Anywhere for You"
Region	Date	Format	Label
Sweden	12 February 2014	Digital download	Universal Island
United Kingdom	30 March 2014	Digital download	Universal Island
