= Now That I Found You =

Now That I Found You may refer to:

- "Now That I Found You" (Carly Rae Jepsen song), 2019
- "Now That I Found You" (Terri Clark song), 1998
- "Now That I Found You", a song by Britney Spears from Britney Jean, 2013

== See also ==
- "Baby Now That I've Found You", a 1967 song by The Foundations
- Now That I've Found You (disambiguation)
