= Florian Picasso =

French DJ and record producer based in Cannes

- Born: 21 February 1990 (age 36); Ho Chi Minh City, Vietnam
- Origin: Cannes, France
- Genres: Hard house; Hard groove
- Occupations: Musician; DJ; record producer
- Years active: 2011–present
- Labels: Hot Meal Records; DKD Records; Ultra Music; Protocol Recordings; Spinnin' Records; Mixmash Records; House Of House; Cr2 Records; Scorpio Music; Stmpd Rcrds
- Website: http://florianpicasso.com/

Florian Ruiz-Picasso (born in 21 February 1990), is a French DJ and record producer based in Cannes. By adoption, he is a great-grandson of the artist, Pablo Picasso. He gained recognition for collaborations with Martin Garrix, Nicky Romero and Steve Aoki. In 2016, he was ranked by DJ Mag at 38th on their annual list of Top 100 DJs.

Since 2024, Picasso has pursued a more underground and independent musical direction. In 2025, he launched his own label, DKD Records, debuting with the Hi Heels EP, which introduced a harder, more groove-oriented techno sound. He also initiated Dekadance, envisioned as a creative movement and platform for genre-blending electronic music.

In 2025, following the release of his Hi Heels EP on DKD Records, Picasso released his second major project of the year, the single "When I Saw U". The track was designed to evoke a sense of pure happiness and emotional uplift, aiming to capture the instant, euphoric feeling of connection when someone enters a room. Picasso’s recent work reflects his focus on releasing music independently and shaping his own artistic direction.

== Early and personal life ==
Picasso was born in Vietnam and was adopted by Marina Picasso, the granddaughter of the famous artist, Pablo Picasso. After his adoption, he moved to Cannes, France, and has described the city as his hometown. He was also raised in Paris and Switzerland. He started making music at the age of 13, when he would perform at events in his boarding school Collège Alpin International Beau Soleil. He became more serious about his musical career at the age of 19.

He currently resides in Geneva, Switzerland and Cannes, France.

== Career ==
Florian Picasso grew up between Paris, Cannes, and Switzerland. Florian's passion for music began at a young age, with a love for classic hip-hop. His musical influences expanded as he discovered electronic music through artists like Basement Jaxx and Groove Armada. Starting at the age of 13, Florian began DJing and honing his skills on a basic setup. He quickly developed his own style, showcasing a versatile range of genres from trance to trap and electro house.

Florian Picasso started his career as a DJ and music producer in 2013. He has collaborated with several renowned DJs and producers, including Steve Aoki, Nicky Romero and Martin Garrix. Picasso has performed at major music festivals such as Ultra Music Festival and Tomorrowland. He has been performing in big clubs since he was 16 years old, has opened for acts like Swedish House Mafia and began headlining his own shows.

On 29 June 2016, he released a single titled "Final Call" through Armada Music under exclusive license from Protocol Recordings, a label run by Nicky Romero. The song peaked on Billboard's Dance/Mix Show Airplay chart at 39. On 23 November 2016, it was announced that Picasso signed a deal with Spinnin' Records, with whom he released a single titled "Cracked Wall" on 2 December 2016. Florian Picasso was known for his hybrid and versatile style that encompasses genres such as electro house, progressive house, and bass house. His achievements have earned him a spot on DJ Mag's list of top 100 DJs multiple times, reaching a rank of #38.

In 2024 and 2025, Picasso's career took a significant turn as he embraced a more independent sound focused on hard groove. In 2025, he launched his own label, DKD Records, and released the Hi Heels EP, which featured a hard groove style that marked a shift towards his evolving, self-directed musical identity. Also in 2025, he released the single "When I Saw U" on Hot Meal Records, the label run by well-known DJ Badboombox. The track reflected Picasso's focus on emotional uplift and pure happiness, marking a further step in his move towards independent music production and artistic freedom. This period highlighted Picasso's commitment to autonomy in the music industry, creating releases on his own terms.

== Show at the Villa Californie in Cannes ==
In August 2020, Florian Picasso organized a music and light show at Villa La Californie. This was a 90-minute DJ set live from Pablo Picasso's atelier in his villa in Cannes. The backdrop of the performance was recreated to showcase the atelier as it was when Pablo lived and worked in it. In addition, Vietnamese/French painter and graffiti artist Cyril Kongo will paint a custom piece live throughout the stream. After the show, Kongo's work was auctioned off to buyers. Proceeds were directed to Vietnam's Quang Chau Foundation Orphanage. The presentation involved the efforts of over 25 individuals who worked diligently for a period of four months. Florian expressed that turning the entire house into a moving piece of art felt like the right way to pay tribute to what this place represents and the history it has. "My team and I put a lot of work into this show and the response has been absolutely amazing so far.", said Florian.

== NFT auction ==
Florian Picasso's intended to auction an NFT connected to a ceramic bowl claimed to be crafted by his great-grandfather, Pablo Picasso. Musician John Legend had written a new song together with Nas and Florian to accompany the Picasso NFT auction.

Florian and his mother, Marina Picasso, initially announced that the NFT and the bowl would be up for auction in March 2022. However, it later became apparent that the auction would also include NFTs associated with Florian's own work, rather than Pablo's. This confusion prompted the Picasso estate to intervene and prevent the auction from proceeding without their permission.

According to The Art Newspaper, the Picasso Administration stated that Florian and Marina's project would be considered "counterfeit" if the sale were to take place without obtaining proper authorization. Despite the setback, it has been clarified that the NFT sale has been postponed rather than cancelled. Florian Picasso's manager, Cyril Noterman, expressed the intention to provide further details to alleviate the confusion surrounding the situation.

Swift action was taken, and the NFT was removed from the auction platform. The licensing agent responsible for Basquiat's archive clarified that the estate owned the copyright to the artwork and had not granted any license or rights to the seller. Consequently, the NFT was withdrawn from sale.

== Discography ==
=== Extended plays ===
List of EPs, with selected details
Title	Details
X	Released: 24 March 2017; Label: Spinnin' Premium; Formats: Digital download
Héritage	Released: 3 December 2021; Label: Stmpd; Formats: Digital download
Hi Heels EP	Released: 4 April 2025; Label: DKD Records

=== Singles ===
==== Charted singles ====
Title	Year	Peak chart positions	Album
Title	Year	US Dance/Mix Airplay	Album
"Final Call"	2016	39	Non-album single

==== Other singles ====
Title	Released	Record label	Additional information
That Drum	2011	Joia Records	
How To Sing	2011	Toolroom	
Muki	2011	Toolroom	
Artifact	2013	Cr2 Records	Free download
Artemis	2013	Ones To Watch Records	
Ace	2013	Fake Music	
Trivia	2014	Cr2 Records	
Can Not Stop	2015	Mixmash Records	Free download
Keep Your Eyes On Me	2015	Scorpio Music	
Origami	2015	Protocol Recordings	
Outline	2015		Free download
The Shape (Steve Aoki Edit)	2015	Dim Mak	
Want It Back (Origami)	2015	Protocol Recordings	
FRFX	2015	Mixmash Records	
Saïgon	2016		Free download
Vanguard	2016	Dim Mak	
Kirigami	2016	DOORN Records	
Hanoi	2016		Free Download
Final Call	2016	Protocol Recordings	
Danang	2016		Free Download
Mamo	2016	Protocol Recordings	with Tom Tyger
Sheitan	2016	Maxximize Records	
Make Up Your Mind	2016	Stmpd Rcrds	with Martin Garrix
Cracked Wall	2016	Spinnin' Records	with Vassy
This Is Our Time	2017	Spinnin' Records	
Blast From The Past	2017	Musical Freedom	
Hanabi	2017	Protocol Recordings	with Raiden
X (We Don't Want No, Suwave, Vindaloo Bounce, Genesis)	2017	Spinnin' Records	with Nygma, Loopers, Tom Tyger, Raiden and Blinders
With Me	2017	Spinnin' Records	with Laidback Luke
Guns Down	2017	Spinnin' Records	
Only For Your Love	2017	Protocol Recordings	with Nicky Romero
Obsession	2017	Musical Freedom	
Hanoi to Paris	2017		Free download
Here With You	2018	Dharma Worldwide	with Yves V
Glitch	2018	Protocol Recordings	
The Answer	2018	Musical Freedom	
Hikari	2018	Protocol Recordings	
Midnight Sun	2019	Protocol Recordings	with Nicky Romero
But Us	2019	Stmpd Rcrds	featuring Echosmith
Restart Your Heart	2020	Stmpd Rcrds	with GRX
Armageddon	2020	Dim Mak Records	with Timmy Trumpet
Get Away	2021	Stmpd Rcrds	
Far Away	2021	Stmpd Rcrds	with GRX
Yume	2021	Stmpd Rcrds	
Make It Home	2021	Stmpd Rcrds	
This is The Voice Of Vietnam	2021	Diverse Records	with THIEURHINO+
Tomorrow	2022	John Legend Music	with John Legend featuring Nas
The Tide	2022	Stmpd Rcrds	
The Tide - Extended Mix	2022	Stmpd Rcrds	
Ay Papi	2023	La Californie Musique	
It's Alright	2023	La Californie Musique	
What's The Next Move?	2023	La Californie Musique	
Shiretsu	2023	Stmpd Rcrds	
Safari	2023	La Californie Musique	
Make Me Dance	2023	La Californie Musique	
The Edge	2023	La Californie Musique	
Unwind	2023	La Californie Musique	
Waking Dream	2023	La Californie Musique	
When I Saw U	2025	Hot Meal Records	

=== Remixes ===
2013

- Tegan & Sara - Closer (Florian Picasso Remix) [Warner]

2014

- Benny Benassi & Gary Go - Let This Last Forever (Florian Picasso Remix) [Ultra]
- Christina Perri - Burning Gold (Florian Picasso Remix) [Atlantic Records]
- Steve Aoki & Flux Pavilion - Get Me Outta Here (Florian Picasso Remix) [Ultra]
- NERVO & R3hab featuring Ayah Marar - Ready For The Weekend (Florian Picasso Remix) [Spinnin / Free]

2015

- NERVO featuring Nile Rodgers, Kylie Minogue & Jake Shears - The Other Boys (Florian Picasso Remix) [Ultra]

2017

- Oliver Heldens feat. Ida Corr - Good Life (Florian Picasso Remix) [Heldeep Records]
