= Matisse & Sadko =

Russian DJ and production duo

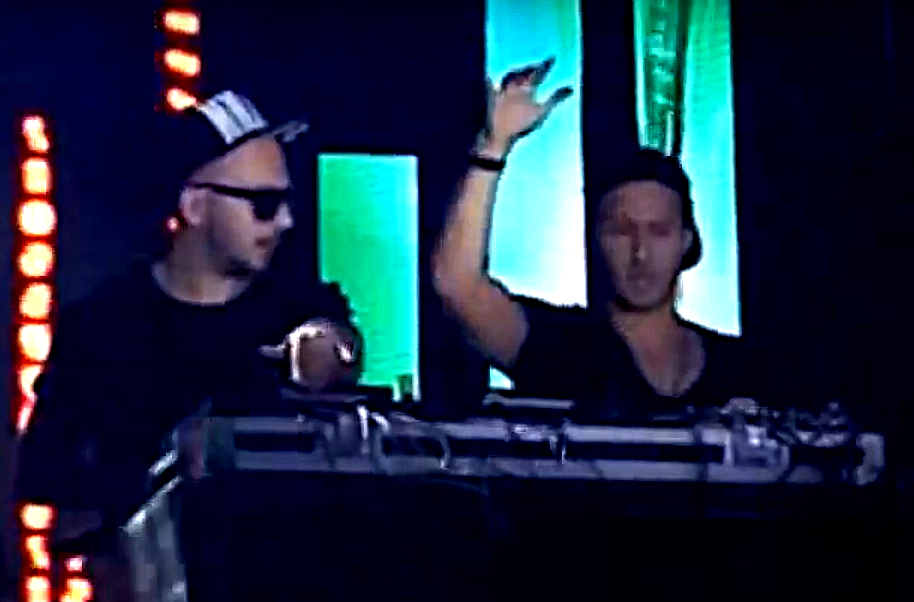
- Matisse & Sadko live at Novouralsk in 2014.

Background information
- Also known as: Daffy Muffin, Shy Baboon
- Origin: Sosnovy Bor, Leningrad Oblast, Russia
- Genres: Progressive house; trance; electro house; big room house; future house; future bass
- Occupations: DJs; record producers
- Years active: 2010–present
- Labels: Spinnin'; Axtone; Size; Refune; Stmpd; Armada; Monomark; Tomorrowland Music
- Members: Aleksandr Parkhomenko; Yury Parkhomenko

Matisse & Sadko are a Russian DJ and production duo from Sosnovy Bor (80 kilometres from the city of Saint Petersburg), consisting of brothers Aleksandr and Yury Parkhomenko. They have been the forerunners in incorporating modern technology with the beats to inspire a technological revolution in the music industry and are best known for their collaborations with Dutch DJ Martin Garrix in tracks "Dragon", "Forever", "Break Through the Silence", "Together", "Mistaken", "Hold On", "Won't Let You Go" and "Good Morning", which were received positively by critics.

== History ==
Matisse & Sadko are widely regarded for being one of the front runners of modern Progressive House in the last 10 years. Alexander Parkhomenko and Yury Parkhomenko both started out as solo artists and started working together under the name "Matisse & Sadko" in 2010. Initially releasing tracks on labels Armada Zouk and Refune Music, they were brought into mainstream eyes with the release of "Trio" on 5 March 2012 which was produced with Russian DJ Arty. The track received support from artists Swedish House Mafia, Alesso and Dirty South and was known for inputting "elements from classic trance to create a truly monumental progressive house festival anthem". On 12 August 2013, Matisse & Sadko collaborated with Steve Angello to release "SLVR" on Angello's label Size Records, which marked its 100th release and Size's 10th anniversary. They follow up with notable releases "Sigure", "Stars", and "Persia" before working with Dutch DJ Martin Garrix to release their Break Through the Silence EP, containing the songs "Break Through the Silence" and "Dragon". They moved to a softer sound with the release of "Memories" on 7 September 2015, which was dubbed as a "contemporary piano house" track.

For the 2016 IIHF World Championship event, Matisse & Sadko produced its official theme song which was titled "Go!" They revealed their independent record label "Monomark Music" initially through a 30-second video on YouTube, and officially launched it with the release of "Machine Gun" through Monomark on 1 October 2016. Matisse & Sadko collaborated with Martin Garrix for their third time in the track "Together", which was released on 20 October 2016 and featured in Garrix's Seven EP. Their second release on Monomark was an Arabic-influenced track titled "Ya Amar" which was released on 17 December 2016, marking their final release for that year.

On 20 October 2017, "Forever" was released through Stmpd Rcrds which was made in collaboration with Martin Garrix. The track was initially premiered by Garrix during the Creamfields 2017 festival, and was released one day before the annual DJ Mag Top 100 announcement. They released "Witchcraft" through Monomark on 24 November 2017. The name "Witchcraft" originated from the duo's fanbase, who titled the track as so before its official reveal. The release of "Into You" on 8 December 2017 which featured singer Hanne Mjøen was a shift from their house music tracks into a more downtempo future bass sound. The duo characterized the track as "very melodic" with an atmospheric "melancholy flavour".

Matisse & Sadko's first release of 2018 produced with Tiësto titled "Dawnbreaker" was released on 27 March 2018. The track was initially premiered by Tiësto during his Ultra Music Festival 2018 set, and also appeared on his debut EP, I Like It Loud. "Grizzly" was released on 4 May 2018, which featured a fusion of "heavy groove-progressive house and bass house". The duo released "Built For Us" through Monomark on 1 June 2018, a track containing house music elements which differs from their previous electro releases. On 16 August 2018, they released "Saga" through Stmpd Rcrds, a song which the duo described as "not just a festival record, but an epic melody with a heroic mood, which can easily relate to the title of the track".
