= John Martin (singer) =

Swedish singer and songwriter (born 1980)

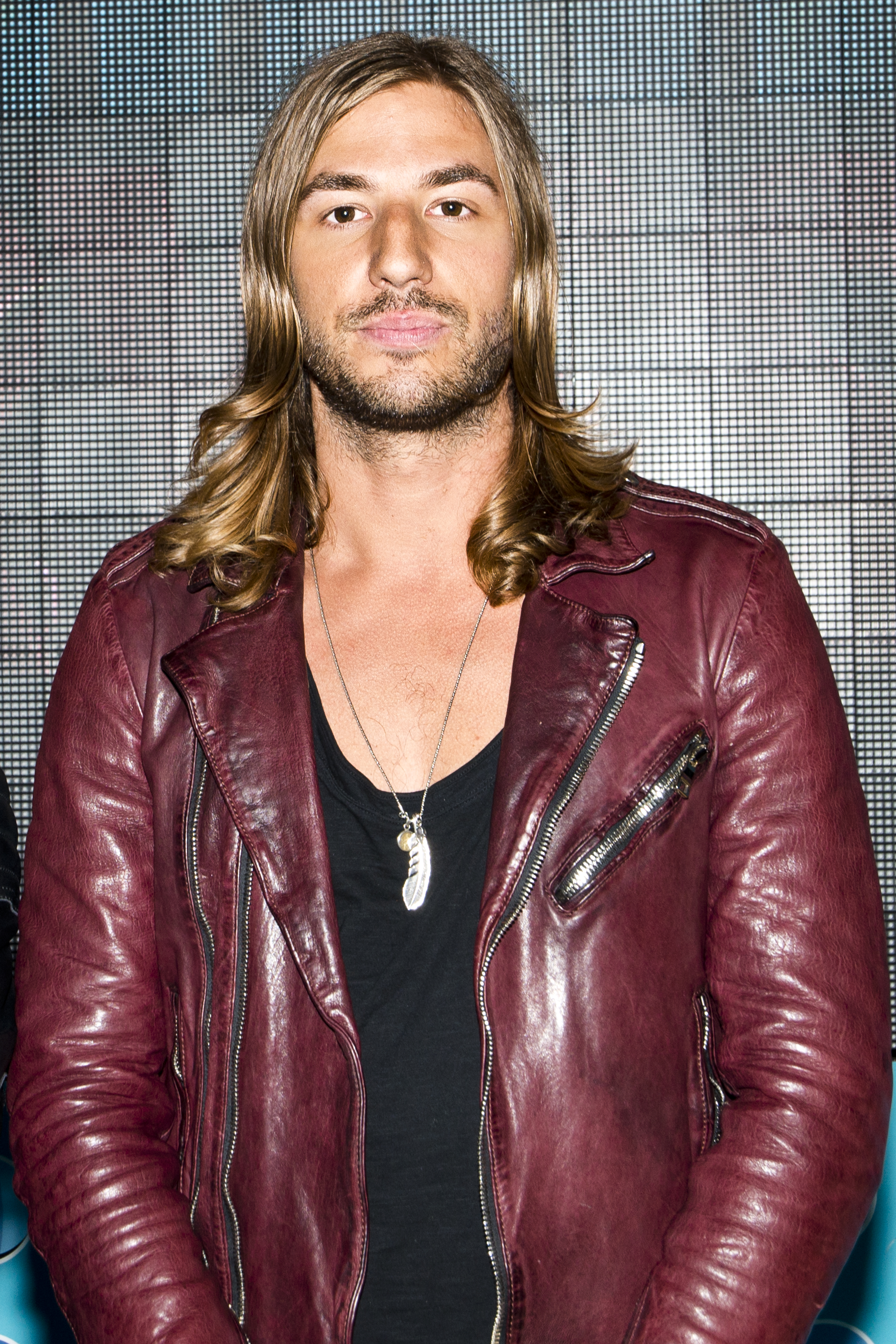
- John Martin at Sommarkrysset

Background information
- Born: John Martin Lindström; 22 August 1980 (age 45); Stockholm, Sweden
- Origin: Stockholm, Sweden
- Genres: House; progressive house; indie pop
- Occupations: Singer; songwriter
- Instruments: Vocals; guitar; piano
- Years active: 2010–present
- Website: johnmartinofficial.com

John Martin Lindström (born 22 August 1980) is a Swedish singer and songwriter. He is known for his collaborations with Swedish House Mafia, Avicii, and Martin Garrix, as well as a solo artist under his own name. Martin is also a member of the music duo VCATION.

== Early life ==
John Martin Lindström was born on 22 August 1980, and grew up in Stockholm. He is the son of a rally driver but chose to pursue music instead of motorsport. Through his older brother, he was introduced to grunge and the Seattle rock scene during his early teens.

At the age of 13 he received his first electric guitar and started the rock band Steroids with his classmates, initially only playing Nirvana covers. After a year, the band began writing their own songs and soon performed at school parties and local bars.

In the mid-2000s steroids became part of Stockholm's alternative rock scene, known for their chaotic live performances. The band signed a record deal and recorded an album that was never released.

== Artist ==
During Steroids final year as a band, John Martin met songwriter Michel Zitron during a night out at Berns. The two soon began a fruitful musical collaboration and, together with Swedish House Mafia, wrote the song "Save the World," which was released on 22 April 2011. The song reached number ten on the UK singles chart and peaked at number one on the American "Hot Dance Club Songs" chart. The same year, "Save the World" was nominated for a Grammy for Best Dance Recording.

The following year, John Martin worked again with Swedish House Mafia on "Don't You Worry Child". The song became a huge hit when it was released on 11 September 2012, and reached the top ten on the US Billboard chart, a feat no Swedish band had achieved since 1998. "Don't You Worry Child" was also nominated for a Grammy.

Through his collaboration with Swedish House Mafia, Martin established himself as one of the most prominent singers and songwriters in electronic dance music. Together with the DJ group, he toured the world and performed at venues such as Alexandra Palace in London and Madison Square Garden in New York City, as well as in front of a total of 135,000 people over three days at Strawberry Arena in Stockholm.

In 2013 John Martin worked with Tinie Tempah and contributed lyrics and vocals to his song "Children of the Sun", which was released on 25 October. The song reached number six on the UK singles chart. The same year, he also appeared on "Reload" by Sebastian Ingrosso and Tommy Trash.

In 2014 John Martin decided to focus entirely on his solo career as an artist and signed with Island Records, known for representing artists like Bob Marley and U2. In an interview with Dagens Nyheter, he said: "I couldn't wait any longer. My fans are growing. It hasn't been entirely clear who I actually am. I haven't been the front figure, not featured in the videos, just been a name and a voice. Now I want to show who I am." The single "Anywhere for You" released in the spring of 2014, reached fourth place on the UK Dance chart and went platinum in Sweden. Despite the success, the album was never released.

After a break from music, John Martin collaborated with Martin Garrix on the single "Higher Ground" and with Gryffin on "CRY" in 2020. In 2021, he worked again with Martin Garrix on "Won’t Let You Go" and together with David Guetta on "Impossible" and the Brazilian artist ALOK on "Wherever You Go." In 2022 and 2023, he contributed lyrics and vocals to Steve Aoki's songs "Whole Again" and "Won’t Forget This Time".

On 24 August 2023 John Martin released "Coming Home" together with the Ukrainian duo Artbat. The music video for the song, directed by Pavel Buryak, shows Ukrainian soldiers coming home from the war and reuniting with their families.

== Songwriter ==
In addition to the projects he has both written and performed on, John Martin has written songs with a range of artists such as Avicii ("Fade into Darkness"), Martin Garrix ("Home," ”Hold On," ”Real Love," ”Carry You," ”Together"), Alesso ("In My Blood"), Afrojack ("We’ll Be Ok"), Bob Moses ("Love Brand New," ”Time and Time Again"), Julian Lennon ("Lucky Ones"), Josef Salvat ("Promiscuity"), Danny Saucedo ("Happy That You Found Me"), RLY ("Safe & Sound," ”Ring The Alarm"), New Hope Club ("Let Me Down"), Kat Cunning ("Broken Heart"), Felix Jaehn ("Never Alone"), Style of Eye ("Sweetest Heartache"), and Alice Chater ("Girls X Boys").

== VCATION ==
In 2018, John Martin, together with Michel Zitron, launched the music project VCATION by releasing the single "Lay Low." With VCATION, the duo sought a more organic and relaxed sound than in their previous EDM songs. The project has since released several tracks, including "When We Were Gold," "Stairway to the Sun," "Love You Long Time," "Rise Up," "Let U Go," and "Miss U.

== Discography ==
Year	Title	Artist(s)	Songwriter	Vocals	Nomination
2011	Fade into Darkness	Avicii	Yes	No	
2011	Save The World	Swedish House Mafia	Yes	Yes	Grammy
2012	Don't You Worry Child	Swedish House Mafia	Yes	Yes	Grammy
2013	Children of the Sun	Tinie Tempah	Yes	Yes	
2013	Reload	Sebastian Ingrosso & Tommy Trash	No	Yes	
2014	Anywhere for You	John Martin	Yes	Yes	
2014	Love Louder	John Martin	Yes	Yes	
2014	Sweetest Heartache	Style of Eye	Yes	No	
2014	We’ll Be Ok	Afrojack	Yes	No	
2015	In My Blood	Alesso	Yes	No	
2015	Together	Ella Eyre	Yes	No	
2016	Together	Martin Garrix	Yes	No	
2018	Lay Low	VCATION	Yes	Yes	
2018	When We Were Gold	VCATION	Yes	Yes	
2018	Girls X Boys	Alice Chater	Yes	No	
2019	Never Alone	Felix Jaehn, Mesto	Yes	No	
2019	Home	Martin Garrix	Yes	No	
2019	Hold On	Martin Garrix	Yes	No	
2020	Higher Ground	Martin Garrix	Yes	Yes	
2020	Stairway to the Sun	VCATION	Yes	Yes	
2020	CRY	Gryffin	Yes	Yes	
2020	Let Me Down	New Hope Club	Yes	No	
2020	Broken Heart	Kat Cunning	Yes	No	
2021	Love You Long Time	VCATION	Yes	Yes	
2021	Won't Let You Go	Martin Garrix	Yes	Yes	
2021	Impossible	David Guetta	Yes	Yes	
2021	Wherever You Go	ALOK	Yes	Yes	
2022	Let U Go	VCATION	Yes	Yes	
2022	Miss U	VCATION	Yes	Yes	
2022	Rise Up	VCATION	Yes	Yes	
2022	Whole Again	Steve Aoki	Yes	Yes	
2022	Love Brand New	Bob Moses	Yes	No	
2022	Time and Time Again	Bob Moses	Yes	No	
2022	Lucky Ones	Julian Lennon	Yes	No	
2022	Ride	Carlos Jean	Yes	No	
2022	Follow	Topic	Yes	No	
2022	Promiscuity	Josef Salvat	Yes	No	
2023	Won't Forget This Time	Steve Aoki	Yes	Yes	
2023	Real Love	Martin Garrix	Yes	No	
2023	Coming Home	Artbat	Yes	Yes	
2023	A Little More Lost	Georgia Ku	Yes	No	
2024	Happy That You Found Me	Danny Saucedo	Yes	No	
2024	Safe & Sound	RLY	Yes	No	
2024	Ring The Alarm	RLY	Yes	No	
2024	Carry You	Martin Garrix	Yes	No	
2026	All My Life	Timmy Trumpet and Frank Walker	TBA	Yes	

== See also ==
- Popular music in Sweden

== Notes ==
- A "Anywhere for You" did not chart on the Belgian Flanders Ultratop, but it did chart at number 20 on the Ultratip chart, the top 100 songs which have not made the Ultratop 50.
