= Michel Zitron =

Swedish record producer, singer-songwriter and DJ

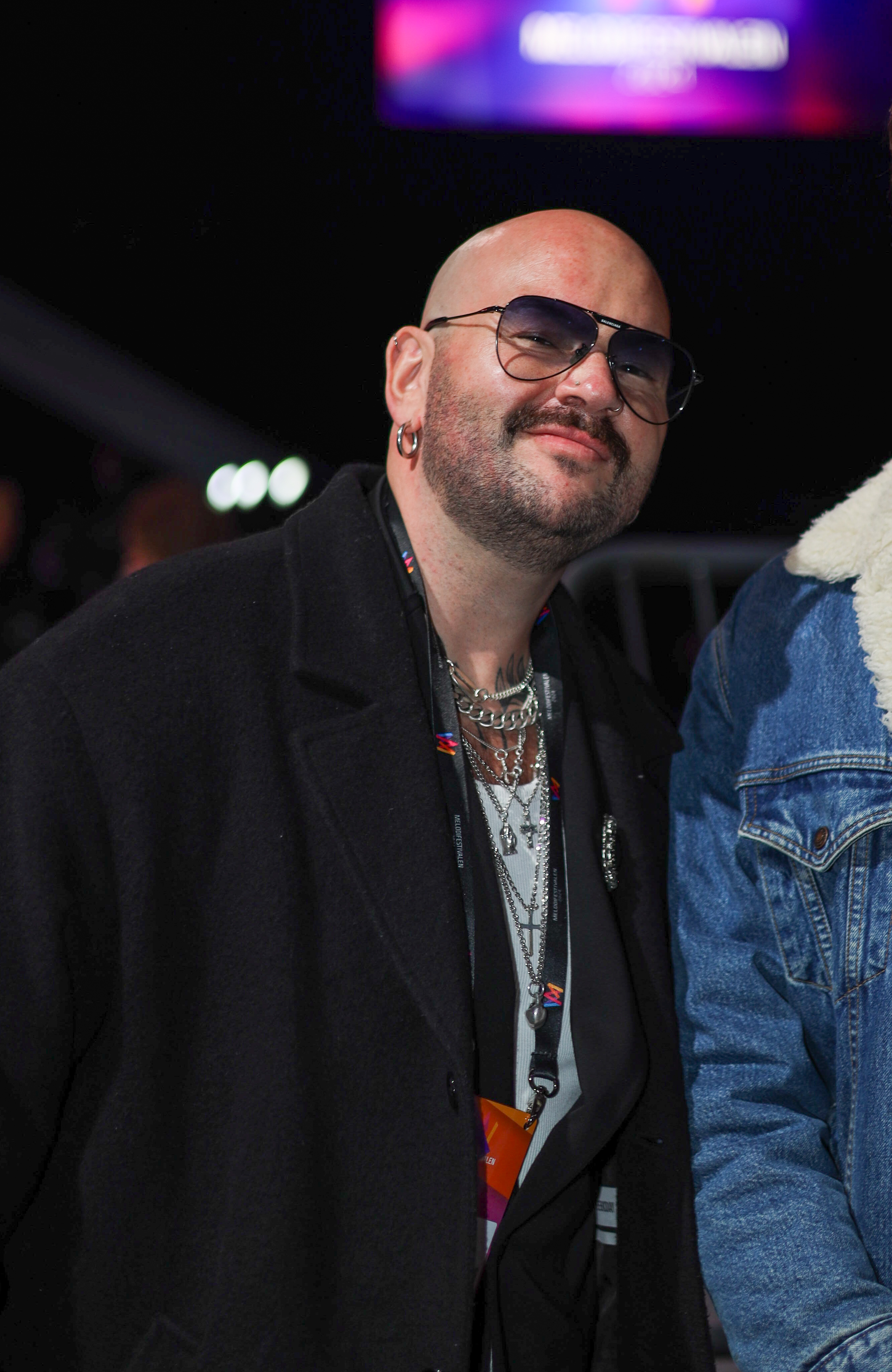
- Michel Zitron during Melodifestivalen 2024.

Background information
- Born: Michel Henry Allan Zitron
- Origin: Stockholm, Sweden
- Genres: House, progressive house, dance-pop
- Occupations: Record producer, singer-songwriter, DJ

Michel Henry Allan Zitron (Swedish pronunciation: [mɪˈɧɛlː sɪˈtruːn]) is a Swedish record producer, singer-songwriter and DJ. He has, along with his main music partner John Martin, worked with Avicii, Alesso, Afrojack, Martin Garrix, Taio Cruz, Tinie Tempah and most notably Swedish House Mafia. He is also co-writer and was the vocalist on Tiësto's track "Red Lights".

== Early life ==
Zitron was born to a Finnish-Romani father and a Finnish mother, and grew up in Tensta, Stockholm. He attended a Finnish-language school until he was 12 years old.

== Music career ==
=== 2018: VCATION ===
On 27 July 2018, Michel Zitron along with John Martin launch a new music project called "VCATION". This was followed by the duo's debut single under this name entitled "Lay Low". Their second single, "When We Went Gold", was released on 21 September 2018. VCATION's first song of 2019 was released on 18 January and was called "Whiskey and Cola".

== Discography ==
=== Singles ===
==== As featured artist ====
List of singles as featured artist, with selected chart positions and certifications, showing year released and album name
Title	Year	Peak chart positions											Certifications	Album
Title	Year	SWE	AUT	BEL	CAN	FIN	GER	IRE	NL	UK	US	US Dance	Certifications	Album
"Red Lights" (Tiësto featuring Michel Zitron) [Uncredited]	2013	9	8	28	41	11	29	3	42	6	56	5	GLF: Gold; ARIA: Platinum; BPI: Silver; RIAA: Gold	A Town Called Paradise
"Sweetest Heartache" (Style of Eye & Asalto featuring Michel Zitron)	2014	—	—	—	—	—	—	—	—	—	—	—		Non-album singles
"Now That I've Found You" (Martin Garrix featuring John Martin and Michel Zitron)	2016	— (Note: "Now That I've Found You" did not enter the Swedish Singles Chart, but peaked at number five on the Swedish Heatseeker chart.)	70	—	—	—	—	—	73	—	—	—		Non-album singles
"Never Alone" (Felix Jaehn and Mesto featuring Michel Zitron)	2019	—	—	—	—	—	—	—	—	—	—	—		Non-album singles
"Hold On" (Martin Garrix and Matisse & Sadko featuring Michael Zitron)	2019	—	—	—	—	—	—	—	—	—	—	—		Non-album singles
"—" denotes a recording that did not chart or was not released in that territory.

=== Songwriting and production credits ===
Title	Year	Artist(s)	Album	Credits
"Save The World"	2011	Swedish House Mafia featuring John Martin	Until Now	Co-writer
"Don't You Worry Child"	2012	Swedish House Mafia featuring John Martin	Until Now	Co-writer
"Anywhere For You"	2014	John Martin	Non-album single	Producer
"In My Blood"	2015	Alesso	Forever	Co-writer
"Together"	2016	Martin Garrix and Matisse & Sadko	Seven	Producer
"Happy That You Found Me"	2024	Danny Saucedo	Non-album single	Co-writer

=== Releases under an alias ===
==== As VCATION (with John Martin) ====
Title	Year	Album
"Lay Low"	2018	Non-album single
"When We Went Gold"	2018	Non-album single
"Whiskey and Cola"	2019	Non-album single

== Awards and nominations ==
=== Grammis Awards ===
Year	Category	Work	Outcome	Ref.
2013	Best Composer	—N/a	Nominated	
