= Future house =

House subgenre with metallic sound and frequency-modulated basslines

- Stylistic origins: UK garage; Chicago house; deep house; garage house; electro house
- Cultural origins: 2013, Europe
- Typical instruments: DAW

Other topics
- Future garage

Exyl - "Never Letting Go" (2020)
Example of a future house track.

Future house is a house music genre that emerged in the 2010s in the United Kingdom, described as a fusion of deep house, UK garage and incorporating other elements and techniques of other EDM genres. It is high in energy, generally consisting of big drops, 4/4 beats and is sonically bass heavy.

== Etymology ==
The term "future house" was coined by French DJ Tchami and was first used to categorise his 2013 remix of Janet Jackson's "Go Deep" on SoundCloud. Tchami used the term without considering it a genre saying in a 2015 interview "Future house was meant to be 'any kind of house music that hasn't been invented yet,' so I never considered it as a genre. I guess people made it what it is because my music was specific and leading to build a bridge between house and EDM, which isn't a bad thing". Later, in 2016, the popular online music store for DJs Beatport added Future house as one of three new genre tags. The genre has been credited as also being pioneered by Oliver Heldens and Don Diablo.

== Characteristics ==
Future house is a subgenre of house music. Songs within the genre are normally characterized by a muted melody with a metallic, elastic-sounding drop and frequency-modulated basslines. The most common tempo is 126 and 128 BPM, but it can vary around the 120–130 mark.

== Popularity ==
Oliver Heldens' international chart successes "Gecko (Overdrive)" and "Last All Night (Koala)" brought the genre to wider mainstream recognition in 2014, leading to minor feuds between him and Tchami on social media. Artists such as Martin Solveig, GTA and Liam Payne have since incorporated the sound into their work, leading some commentators to observe the commercialization of the style.

== See also ==
- List of electronic music genres
- Styles of house music
