= Stmpd Rcrds =

Dutch record label

- Founded: 4 March 2016
- Founder: Martin Garrix (Martijn Garritsen)
- Genre: Ambient house; downtempo; electro house; tech house; progressive house; future bass; trap; trip hop
- Country of origin: Netherlands
- Location: Amsterdam, Netherlands
- Official website: stmpdrcrds.com

Stmpd Rcrds (stylised in all caps; pronounced "stamped records") is a Dutch electronic dance music record label owned by record producer Martin Garrix, who founded the label on 4 March 2016.

== History ==
Martin Garrix announced the creation of Stmpd through a Dutch TV show and his YouTube miniseries, The Martin Garrix Show, following his departure from Spinnin' Records and MusicAllStars Management in 2015. He stated this was the result of music rights disagreements with Spinnin'.

The name of the label refers to stamps, and was inspired by his father's stamp auctioning company.

Garrix released the first song on the label, "Now That I've Found You", featuring vocals from John Martin and Michel Zitron on 11 March 2016. The original instrumental was dubbed "Don't Crack Under Pressure" by fans. The melody of the song was originally created by Garrix during Dancefair in April 2015, and was notably later played during his closing set of Sziget Festival.

To celebrate the launch of the new label, Garrix hosted a party at Story Nightclub with "Chris Maillé" on 18 March 2016, after he closed the mainstage of Ultra Music Festival Miami.

== Artists ==
- Jonas Aden
- Alpharock
- Arcando
- Area21
- Arty
- Aspyer
- Bad Decisions
- Badflite
- Taska Black
- Bleu Clair
- Blinders
- Brooks
- Caius
- Cazztek
- Cesqeaux
- Cliq
- CMC$
- Codes
- Syn Cole
- Conro
- Crash Land
- Disero
- DubVision
- Dyro
- Dzeko
- Eauxmar
- Ralph Felix
- Focus Fire
- Dillon Francis
- Pierce Fulton
- Salvatore Ganacci
- Martin Garrix
- Goja
- GRX
- Jay Hardway
- Hawksburn
- Todd Helder
- Seth Hills
- Ibranovski
- Infuze
- Julian Jordan
- Kev
- King Arthur
- Lione
- Lodgerz
- Lost Frequencies
- Loopers
- Magnificence
- John Martin
- Tom Martin
- Matisse & Sadko
- Mesto
- Bart B More
- Justin Mylo
- Ootoro
- Osrin
- Florian Picasso
- Perk Pietrek
- R3hab
- Raiden
- Junior Sanchez
- Silque
- Skytech
- Slvr
- Third Party
- TV Noise
- Two Pauz
- Van Duo
- Vluarr
- Michel Zitron
- Zonderling
