= Martin Garrix discography =

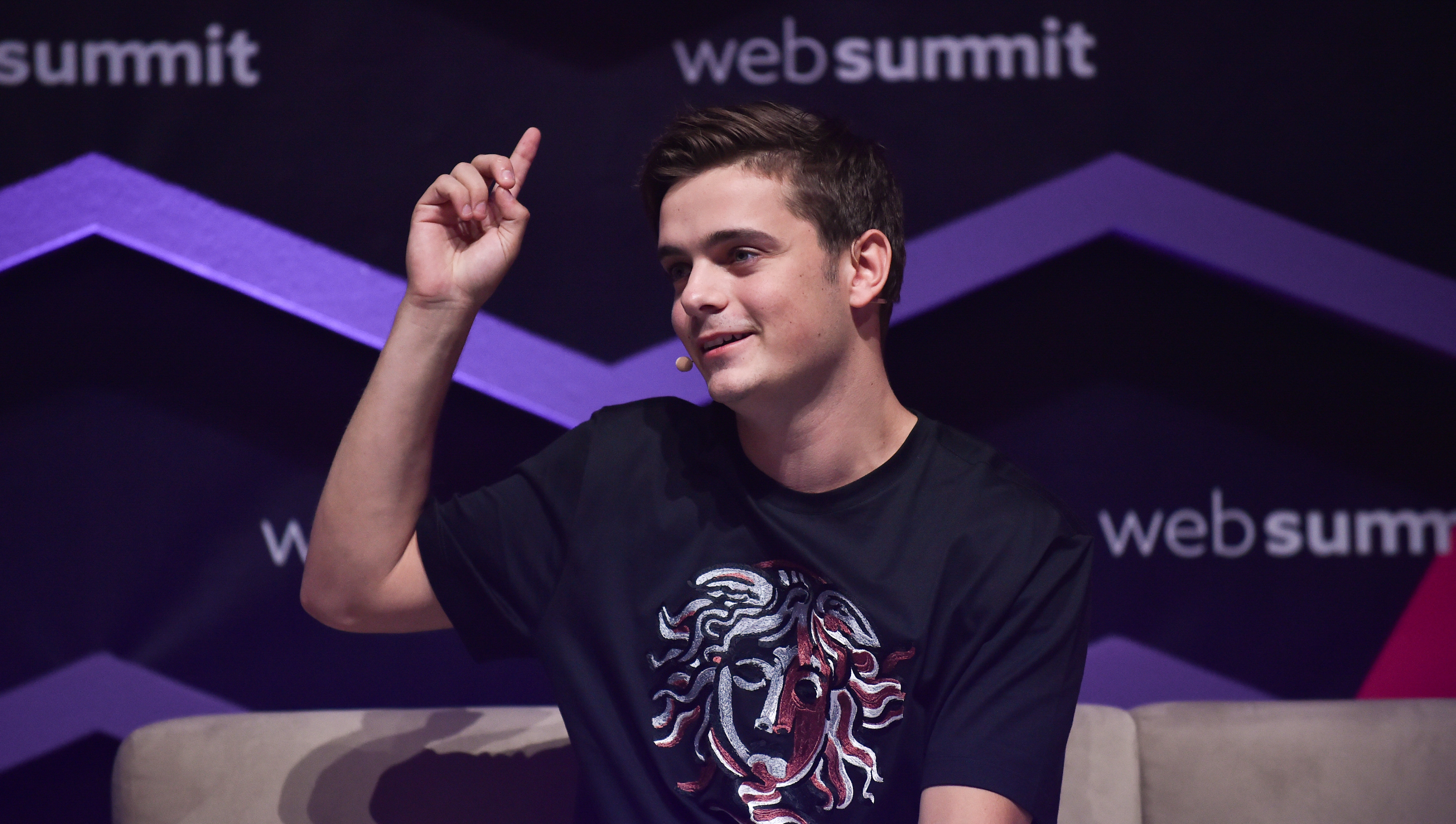
- Garrix in a talk session at Web Summit in November 2017
- Studio albums: 2
- EPs: 7
- Compilation albums: 8
- Singles: 132
- Music videos: 126
- DJ mixes: 8
- Remixes: 12

The discography of Dutch DJ and record producer Martin Garrix consists of two studio albums (including one under alias), eight compilation albums, seven extended plays (EP), eight DJ mixes, 131 singles (including 26 under aliases), twelve remixes and 126 music videos (including 24 under aliases). Part of the Dutch emergence of electronic dance music DJs, Garrix became widely known after his single "Animals" became a worldwide hit. It went number one in the United Kingdom, Belgium, and on the US Billboard Hot Dance Club Songs chart, and it reached the top ten of several charts across Europe from late 2013 to early 2014. Garrix is the youngest Dutch artist to ever have a number one single in the United Kingdom.

Garrix has collaborated with artists such as the Grammy-winning singer Usher, Dua Lipa, Madonna, Bebe Rexha, Ed Sheeran, Madonna, Troye Sivan, Khalid, Bono and the Edge of Irish rock band U2, Dean Lewis and Macklemore. He has also collaborated with fellow DJs such as Tiësto, Avicii, David Guetta, Afrojack, R3hab, Armin van Buuren, Zedd, Alesso and Dimitri Vegas & Like Mike.

== Albums ==
=== Studio albums ===
List of studio albums as lead artist
Title	Details
Sentio	Released: 29 April 2022; Label: Stmpd Rcrds; Formats: Digital download, streaming
Marty	Scheduled: 5 March 2027; Label: Stmpd Rcrds, Darkroom Records; Formats: Digital download, streaming

=== Compilation albums ===
List of compilation albums as lead artist, with selected chart positions
Title	Details	Peak chart positions	
Title	Details	NLD Comp.	JPN
The Martin Garrix Collection	Released: 21 April 2017 (JPN) (Note: Deluxe version was released on 25 April 2018 in Japan only.); Label: Sony; Formats: CD, digital download, streaming	—	106
The Martin Garrix Experience	Released: 10 July 2019 (JPN); Label: Sony; Formats: CD, digital download, streaming	—	57
Martin Garrix presents Stmpd Rcrds Vol. 001	Released: 25 September 2020; Label: Stmpd Rcrds; Formats: Digital download, streaming	13	—
Martin Garrix presents Stmpd Rcrds Vol. 002	Released: 6 November 2020; Label: Stmpd Rcrds; Formats: Digital download, streaming	—	—
Martin Garrix presents Stmpd Rcrds Vol. 003	Released: 27 November 2020; Label: Stmpd Rcrds; Formats: Digital download, streaming	—	—
Martin Garrix presents Stmpd Rcrds Vol. 004	Released: 5 March 2021; Label: Stmpd Rcrds; Formats: Digital download, streaming	—	—
Martin Garrix presents Stmpd Rcrds Vol. 005	Released: 9 July 2021; Label: Stmpd Rcrds; Formats: Digital download, streaming	—	—
Martin Garrix presents Stmpd Rcrds Vol. 006	Released: 11 February 2022; Label: Stmpd Rcrds; Formats: Digital download, streaming	—	—
"—" denotes a recording that did not chart or was not released in that territory.

== Extended plays ==
List of extended plays as lead artist, with selected chart positions
Title	Details	Peak chart positions	
Title	Details	US	US Dance
Gold Skies	Released: 8 July 2014; Label: Casablanca, Spinnin', Schoolboy; Formats: CD, digital download, streaming	171	6
Break Through the Silence (vs. Matisse & Sadko)	Released: 31 August 2015; Label: Casablanca, Spinnin', Schoolboy; Formats: Digital download, streaming	—	—
Seven	Released: 28 October 2016; Label: Stmpd Rcrds, Epic Amsterdam, Sony Netherlands; Formats: Digital download, streaming	—	5
Bylaw	Released: 19 October 2018; Label: Stmpd Rcrds, Epic Amsterdam, Sony Netherlands; Formats: Digital download, streaming	—	19
2019 Remixed	Released: 31 December 2019; Label: Stmpd Rcrds, Epic Amsterdam, Sony Netherlands; Formats: Digital download, streaming	—	22
Idem	Released: 8 March 2024; Label: Stmpd Rcrds; Formats: Digital download, streaming	—	—
Origo	Released: 24 October 2025; Label: Stmpd Rcrds; Formats: Digital download, streaming	—	—
"—" denotes a recording that did not chart or was not released in that territory.

== DJ mixes ==
List of DJ mixes as lead artist, with selected chart positions
Title	Details	Peak chart positions
Title	Details	NLD Comp.
Martin Garrix Presents Stmpd Rcrds	Released: 10 August 2018; Label: Stmpd Rcrds; Formats: Digital download, streaming	—
Tomorrowland Around the World 2020: Martin Garrix	Released: 11 September 2020; Formats: Digital download, streaming	—
Tomorrowland 31.12.2020: Martin Garrix	Released: 15 January 2021; Formats: Digital download, streaming	—
Live at the Empire State Building: Top 100 DJs Winner Performance	Released: 27 October 2022; Formats: Digital download, streaming	—
NYE 2023	Released: 23 December 2022; Formats: Digital download, streaming	—
Martin Garrix Presents Idem at RAI Amsterdam, Oct 20, 2023	Released: 20 October 2023; Formats: Digital download, streaming	21
Martin Garrix at EDC Las Vegas, 2024: Circuit Grounds Stage	Released: 19 May 2024; Formats: Digital download, streaming	—
Tomorrowland Belgium 2025: Martin Garrix at Mainstage, Weekend 2	Released: 27 July 2025; Formats: Digital download, streaming	—
"—" denotes a recording that did not chart or was not released in that territory.

== Singles ==
List of singles as lead artist, with selected chart positions and certifications, showing year released and album name
Title	Year	Peak chart positions										Certifications	Album
Title	Year	NLD	AUS	BEL (FL)	CAN	FRA	GER	NZ	SWE	UK	US	Certifications	Album
"Itsa" (with Sleazy Stereo)	2012	—	—	—	—	—	—	―	—	—	—		Non-album singles
"Keygen"	2012	—	—	—	—	—	—	―	—	—	—		Non-album singles
"Registration Code" (with Jay Hardway)	2012	—	—	—	—	—	—	―	—	—	—		Non-album singles
"Bfam" (with Julian Jordan)	2012	—	—	—	—	—	—	―	—	—	—		Non-album singles
"Torrent" (with Sidney Samson)	2013	—	—	—	—	—	—	―	—	—	—		Non-album singles
"Error 404" (with Jay Hardway)	2013	—	—	—	—	—	—	―	—	—	—		Non-album singles
"Just Some Loops" (with TV Noise)	2013	—	—	—	—	—	—	―	—	—	—		Non-album singles
"Animals"	2013	3	29	1	40	2	4	10	4	1	21	ARIA: Platinum; BPI: Platinum; BRMA: 2× Platinum; BVMI: Platinum; GLF: Platinum; MC: 2× Platinum; RIAA: 2× Platinum; RMNZ: Platinum	Gold Skies
"Wizard" (with Jay Hardway)	2013	16	—	6	67	31	30	―	21	7	—	BPI: Silver; GLF: Gold	Gold Skies
"Helicopter" (with Firebeatz)	2014	59	—	33	—	98	—	―	—	—	—		Non-album single
"Tremor" (with Dimitri Vegas & Like Mike)	2014	44	—	3	—	116	—	―	—	30	—		Gold Skies
"Gold Skies" (with Sander van Doorn and Dvbbs featuring Aleesia)	2014	94	—	— (Note: "Gold Skies" did not enter the Flemish Ultratop 50, but peaked at number nine on the Ultratip chart.)	57	183	—	―	—	49	—		Gold Skies
"Proxy"	2014	89	—	—	—	—	—	―	—	—	—		Gold Skies
"Turn Up the Speakers" (with Afrojack)	2014	50	—	44	—	—	—	―	—	—	—		Non-album single
"Set Me Free" (with Dillon Francis)	2014	—	—	— (Note: "Set Me Free" did not enter the Flemish Ultratop 50, but peaked at number 57 on the Ultratip chart.)	—	—	—	―	—	—	—		Money Sucks, Friends Rule
"Virus (How About Now)" (with MOTi)	2014	27	—	34	—	50	94	―	—	—	—		Non-album singles
"Forbidden Voices"	2015	29	—	—	—	133	—	―	—	—	—		Non-album singles
"Don't Look Down" (featuring Usher)	2015	16	63	26	55	136	37	―	59	9	— (Note: "Don't Look Down" did not enter the Billboard Hot 100, but peaked at number ten on the Bubbling Under Hot 100 Singles chart, which acts as a quasi-extension to the Hot 100.)	ARIA: Gold; BPI: Gold; MC: Gold; RIAA: Gold; RMNZ: Gold	Non-album singles
"The Only Way Is Up" (with Tiësto)	2015	74	—	—	—	—	—	―	81	—	—		Club Life, Vol. 4 - New York City
"Dragon" (vs. Matisse & Sadko)	2015	—	—	— (Note: "Dragon" did not enter the Flemish Ultratop 50, but peaked at number 55 on the Ultratip chart.)	—	—	—	―	—	—	—		Break Through the Silence
"Break Through the Silence" (vs. Matisse & Sadko)	2015	― (Note: "Break Through the Silence" did not enter the Dutch Single Top 100, but peaked at number one on the Single Tip chart.)	—	— (Note: "Break Through the Silence" did not enter the Flemish Ultratop 50, but peaked at number 39 on the Ultratip chart.)	—	—	—	―	—	—	—		Break Through the Silence
"Poison"	2015	—	—	—	—	—	—	―	—	—	—		Non-album singles
"Bouncybob" (featuring Justin Mylo and Mesto)	2015	― (Note: "Bouncybob" did not enter the Dutch Single Top 100, but peaked at number 16 on the Single Tip chart.)	—	—	—	—	—	―	—	—	—		Non-album singles
"Now That I've Found You" (featuring John and Michel)	2016	73	—	—	—	106	—	―	— (Note: "Now That I've Found You" did not enter the Swedish Singles Chart, but peaked at number five on the Swedish Heatseeker chart.)	—	—		Non-album singles
"Lions in the Wild" (with Third Party)	2016	― (Note: "Lions in the Wild" did not enter the Dutch Single Top 100, but peaked at number 15 on the Single Tip chart.)	—	—	—	125	—	―	—	—	—		Hope
"Oops"	2016	—	—	—	—	—	—	―	—	—	—		Non-album singles
"In the Name of Love" (with Bebe Rexha)	2016	4	8	13	19	26	14	8	9	9	24	NVPI: Gold; ARIA: 4× Platinum; BPI: 2× Platinum; BRMA: Platinum; BVMI: 3× Gold; GLF: 4× Platinum; MC: 3× Platinum; RIAA: 3× Platinum; RMNZ: 4× Platinum; SNEP: Diamond	Non-album singles
"Wiee" (with Mesto)	2016	― (Note: "Wiee" did not enter the Dutch Single Top 100, but peaked at number 24 on the Single Tip chart.)	—	—	—	—	—	―	—	—	—		Seven
"Sun Is Never Going Down" (featuring Dawn Golden)	2016	—	—	—	—	—	—	―	—	—	—		Seven
"Spotless" (with Jay Hardway)	2016	—	—	—	—	—	—	―	—	—	—		Seven
"Hold On & Believe" (featuring The Federal Empire)	2016	—	—	—	—	—	—	―	—	—	—		Seven
"Welcome" (with Julian Jordan)	2016	—	—	—	—	—	—	―	—	—	—		Seven
"Together" (with Matisse & Sadko)	2016	—	—	—	—	—	—	―	—	—	—		Seven
"Make Up Your Mind" (with Florian Picasso)	2016	—	—	—	—	—	—	―	—	—	—		Seven
"Scared to Be Lonely" (with Dua Lipa)	2017	3	14	10	32	32	9	8	3	14	76	NVPI: 3× Platinum; ARIA: 3× Platinum; BPI: 2× Platinum; BRMA: Platinum; BVMI: 3× Gold; GLF: 4× Platinum; MC: 2× Platinum; RIAA: 2× Platinum; RMNZ: 4× Platinum; SNEP: Diamond	Dua Lipa: Complete Edition
"Byte" (with Brooks)	2017	― (Note: "Byte" did not enter the Dutch Single Top 100, but peaked at number 21 on the Single Tip chart.)	—	—	—	—	—	―	—	—	—		Non-album singles
"There for You" (with Troye Sivan)	2017	12	23	19	48	60	31	22	34	40	94	ARIA: 2× Platinum; BPI: Gold; BRMA: Platinum; BVMI: Gold; GLF: Gold; MC: Platinum; RIAA: Platinum; RMNZ: Platinum; SNEP: Gold	Non-album singles
"Pizza"	2017	― (Note: "Pizza" did not enter the Dutch Single Top 100, but peaked at number six on the Single Tip chart.)	—	—	—	—	—	―	― (Note: "Pizza" did not enter the Swedish Singellista Chart, but peaked at number 12 on the Swedish Heatseeker Chart.)	—	—		Non-album singles
"Forever" (with Matisse & Sadko)	2017	― (Note: "Forever" did not enter the Dutch Single Top 100, but peaked at number three on the Single Tip chart.)	—	— (Note: "Forever" did not enter the Flemish Ultratop 50, but peaked at number 16 on the Ultratip chart.)	—	—	—	―	—	—	—		Non-album singles
"So Far Away" (with David Guetta featuring Jamie Scott and Romy Dya)	2017	14	58	39	69	83	8	— (Note: "So Far Away" did not enter the NZ Top 40 Singles Chart, but peaked at number three on the NZ Heatseeker Singles Chart.)	30	81	—	ARIA: Gold; BPI: Silver; BRMA: Gold; BVMI: Platinum; MC: Gold; RIAA: Gold; RMNZ: Gold; SNEP: Gold	7
"Like I Do" (with David Guetta and Brooks)	2018	21	73	42	72	31	23	— (Note: "Like I Do" did not enter the NZ Top 40 Singles Chart, but peaked at number ten on the NZ Heatseeker Singles Chart.)	15	29	—	BPI: Gold; BVMI: Gold; MC: Platinum; RIAA: Gold; RMNZ: Platinum; SNEP: Platinum	7
"Game Over" (with Loopers)	2018	—	—	—	—	—	—	―	—	—	—		Non-album singles
"Ocean" (featuring Khalid)	2018	16	12	42	28	127	38	11	11	25	78	ARIA: 3× Platinum; BPI: Platinum; BVMI: Gold; MC: Platinum; RIAA: Platinum; RMNZ: 2× Platinum; SNEP: Gold	Non-album singles
"High on Life" (featuring Bonn)	2018	19	59	— (Note: "High on Life" did not enter the Flemish Ultratop 50, but peaked at number one on the Ultratip chart.)	82	131	66	— (Note: "High on Life" did not enter the NZ Top 40 Singles Chart, but peaked at number 11 on the NZ Hot Singles Chart.)	29	—	—	BPI: Silver; MC: Gold; RMNZ: Gold; SNEP: Gold	Non-album singles
"Burn Out" (with Justin Mylo featuring Dewain Whitmore)	2018	52	—	—	—	—	90	— (Note: "Burn Out" did not enter the NZ Top 40 Singles Chart, but peaked at number 22 on the NZ Hot Singles Chart.)	64	—	—		Non-album singles
"Breach (Walk Alone)" (with Blinders)	2018	—	—	—	—	—	—	―	—	—	—		Bylaw
"Yottabyte"	2018	—	—	—	—	—	—	―	—	—	—		Bylaw
"Latency" (with Dyro)	2018	—	—	—	—	—	—	―	—	—	—		Bylaw
"Access"	2018	―	―	―	—	―	―	―	―	―	―		Bylaw
"Waiting for Tomorrow" (with Pierce Fulton featuring Mike Shinoda)	2018	― (Note: "Waiting for Tomorrow" did not enter the Dutch Single Top 100, but peaked at number 23 on the Single Tip chart.)	―	―	—	―	―	―	―	―	―		Bylaw
"Dreamer" (featuring Mike Yung)	2018	― (Note: "Dreamer" did not enter the Dutch Single Top 100, but peaked at number 1 on the Single Tip chart.)	―	— (Note: "Dreamer" did not enter the Flemish Ultratop 50, but peaked at number 17 on the Ultratip chart.)	—	―	―	―	73	―	―		Non-album singles
"Glitch" (with Julian Jordan)	2018	― (Note: "Glitch" did not enter the Dutch Single Top 100, but peaked at number 16 on the Single Tip chart.)	―	―	—	―	―	―	―	―	―		Non-album singles
"No Sleep" (featuring Bonn)	2019	38	―	41	—	―	96	— (Note: "No Sleep" did not enter the NZ Top 40 Singles Chart, but peaked at number 15 on the NZ Hot Singles Chart.)	41	―	―		Non-album singles
"Mistaken" (with Matisse & Sadko featuring Alex Aris)	2019	―	―	―	—	―	―	— (Note: "Mistaken" did not enter the NZ Top 40 Singles Chart, but peaked at number 38 on the NZ Hot Singles Chart.)	―	―	―		Non-album singles
"Summer Days" (featuring Macklemore and Patrick Stump)	2019	14	47	19	37	26	24	— (Note: "Summer Days" did not enter the NZ Top 40 Singles Chart, but peaked at number 12 on the NZ Hot Singles Chart.)	34	26	100	ARIA: Gold; BPI: Gold; BRMA: Gold; BVMI: Gold; MC: 2× Platinum; RIAA: Platinum; RMNZ: Platinum; SNEP: Diamond	Non-album singles
"These Are the Times" (featuring JRM)	2019	― (Note: "These Are the Times" did not enter the Dutch Single Top 100, but peaked at number 14 on the Single Tip chart.)	―	―	—	―	―	— (Note: "These Are the Times" did not enter the NZ Top 40 Singles Chart, but peaked at number 25 on the NZ Hot Singles Chart.)	― (Note: "These Are the Times" did not enter the Swedish Singellista Chart, but peaked at number 14 on the Swedish Heatseeker Chart.)	―	―		Non-album singles
"Home" (featuring Bonn)	2019	94	―	―	—	―	―	―	61	―	―		Non-album singles
"Used to Love" (with Dean Lewis)	2019	32	46	25	92	―	―	— (Note: "Used to Love" did not enter the NZ Top 40 Singles Chart, but peaked at number 14 on the NZ Hot Singles Chart.)	40	―	―	ARIA: Gold; RMNZ: Gold	Non-album singles
"Hold On" (with Matisse & Sadko featuring Michel Zitron)	2019	― (Note: "Hold On" did not enter the Dutch Single Top 100, but peaked at number eight on the Single Tip chart.)	―	―	—	―	―	— (Note: "Hold On" did not enter the NZ Top 40 Singles Chart, but peaked at number 36 on the NZ Hot Singles Chart.)	― (Note: "Hold On" did not enter the Swedish Singellista Chart, but peaked at number eight on the Swedish Heatseeker Chart.)	―	―		Non-album singles
"Drown" (featuring Clinton Kane)	2020	36	―	— (Note: "Drown" did not enter the Flemish Ultratop 50, but peaked at number 33 on the Ultratip chart.)	—	―	―	— (Note: "Drown" did not enter the NZ Top 40 Singles Chart, but peaked at number 19 on the NZ Hot Singles Chart.)	76	―	―	RMNZ: Gold	Non-album singles
"Higher Ground" (featuring John Martin)	2020	68	—	— (Note: "Higher Ground" did not enter the Flemish Ultratop 50, but peaked at number one on the Ultratip chart.)	—	—	—	―	80	—	—		Non-album singles
"Pressure" (featuring Tove Lo)	2021	29	—	— (Note: "Pressure" did not enter the Flemish Ultratop 50, but peaked at number 16 on the Ultratip chart.)	—	—	—	— (Note: "Pressure" did not enter the NZ Top 40 Singles Chart, but peaked at number seven on the NZ Hot Singles Chart.)	39	—	—		Non-album singles
"We Are the People" (featuring Bono and the Edge)	2021	15	―	6	—	89	15	―	47	―	―	BRMA: Gold; SNEP: Gold	Non-album singles
"Love Runs Out" (featuring G-Eazy and Sasha Alex Sloan)	2021	― (Note: "Love Runs Out" did not enter the Dutch Single Top 100, but peaked at number one on the Single Tip chart.)	―	―	—	―	89	— (Note: "Love Runs Out" did not enter the NZ Top 40 Singles Chart, but peaked at number 14 on the NZ Hot Singles Chart.)	― (Note: "Love Runs Out" did not enter the Swedish Singellista Chart, but peaked at number one on the Swedish Heatseeker Chart.)	―	―		Non-album singles
"Diamonds" (with Julian Jordan and Tinie Tempah)	2021	― (Note: "Diamonds" did not enter the Dutch Single Top 100, but peaked at number 27 on the Single Tip chart.)	―	―	—	―	―	―	―	―	―		Hyper House
"Won't Let You Go" (with Matisse & Sadko and John Martin)	2021	― (Note: "Won't Let You Go" did not enter the Dutch Single Top 100, but peaked at number eight on the Single Tip chart.)	―	―	—	―	―	— (Note: "Won't Let You Go" did not enter the NZ Top 40 Singles Chart, but peaked at number 36 on the NZ Hot Singles Chart.)	―	―	―		Non-album single
"Follow" (with Zedd)	2022	― (Note: "Follow" did not enter the Dutch Single Top 100, but peaked at number 17 on the Single Tip chart.)	―	―	—	―	―	―	―	―	―		Sentio
"Limitless" (with Mesto)	2022	―	―	―	―	―	―	―	―	―	―		Sentio
"Reboot" (with Vluarr)	2022	―	―	―	―	―	―	―	―	―	―		Sentio
"Quantum" (with Brooks)	2022	―	―	―	―	―	―	―	―	―	―		Sentio
"Good Morning" (with Matisse & Sadko)	2022	―	―	―	―	―	―	―	―	―	―		Sentio
"Starlight (Keep Me Afloat)" (with DubVision featuring Shaun Farrugia)	2022	―	―	―	―	―	―	―	―	―	―		Sentio
"Funk" (with Julian Jordan)	2022	―	―	―	―	―	―	―	―	―	―		Sentio
"Find You" (with Justin Mylo featuring Dewain Whitmore)	2022	―	―	―	―	―	―	―	―	―	―		Sentio
"Aurora" (with Blinders)	2022	―	―	―	―	―	―	―	―	―	―		Sentio
"Oxygen" (with DubVision featuring Jordan Grace)	2022	―	―	―	―	―	―	―	―	―	―		Sentio
"If We'll Ever Be Remembered" (with Shaun Farrugia)	2022	―	―	―	―	―	―	―	―	―	―		Sentio
"Loop" (with DallasK featuring Sasha Alex Sloan)	2022	―	―	―	―	―	―	―	―	―	―		Non-album singles
"Something" (with Breathe Carolina)	2022	―	―	―	―	―	―	―	―	―	―		Non-album singles
"Hero" (with Jvke)	2022	57	―	―	―	―	―	— (Note: "Hero" did not enter the NZ Top 40 Singles Chart, but peaked at number 31 on the NZ Hot Singles Chart.)	―	―	―		Non-album singles
"Hurricane" (with Sentinel featuring Bonn)	2023	― (Note: "Hurricane" did not enter the Dutch Single Top 100, but peaked at number 27 on the Single Tip chart.)	―	―	―	―	―	―	―	―	―		Non-album singles
"Real Love" (with Lloyiso)	2023	― (Note: "Real Love" did not enter the Dutch Single Top 100, but peaked at number 27 on the Single Tip chart.)	―	―	―	―	―	―	―	―	―		Non-album singles
"Carry You" (with Third Party featuring Oaks and Declan J Donovan)	2024	—	―	―	―	―	―	―	―	―	―		Idem
"Breakaway" (with Mesto featuring Wilhelm)	2024	—	―	―	―	―	―	―	―	―	―		Idem
"Biochemical" (with Seth Hills)	2024	—	―	―	―	―	―	―	―	―	―		Idem
"Empty" (Note: "Empty" also features on DubVision's debut studio album Another World.) (with DubVision featuring Jaimes)	2024	—	―	―	―	―	―	―	―	―	―		Idem
"Wherever You Are" (with DubVision featuring Shaun Farrugia)	2024	―	―	―	―	―	―	―	―	―	―		Another World
"Smile" (featuring Carolina Liar)	2024	― (Note: "Smile" did not enter the Dutch Single Top 100, but peaked at number two on the Single Tip chart.)	―	45	―	―	―	―	―	―	―		Non-album singles
"Gravity" (with Sem Vox featuring Jaimes)	2024	―	―	―	―	―	―	―	―	―	―		Non-album singles
"Told You So" (with Jex)	2024	27	―	13	―	―	―	— (Note: "Told You So" did not enter the NZ Top 40 Singles Chart, but peaked at number 38 on the NZ Hot Singles Chart.)	―	―	―	BRMA: Gold	Non-album singles
"Angels for Each Other" (with Arijit Singh)	2025	― (Note: "Angels for Each Other" did not enter the Dutch Single Top 100, but peaked at number eight on the Single Tip chart.)	―	―	―	―	―	―	―	―	―		Non-album singles
"Weightless" (with Arijit Singh)	2025	—	―	―	―	―	―	―	―	―	―		Non-album singles
"Mad" (with Lauv)	2025	― (Note: "Mad" did not enter the Dutch Single Top 100, but peaked at number one on the Single Tip chart.)	―	34	―	―	―	— (Note: "Mad" did not enter the NZ Top 40 Singles Chart, but peaked at number 28 on the NZ Hot Singles Chart.)	―	―	―		Non-album singles
"Peace of Mind" (with Citadelle)	2025	—	―	―	―	―	―	―	―	―	―		Origo
"Our Time" (with Afrojack, David Guetta and Amél)	2025	― (Note: "Our Time" did not enter the Dutch Single Top 100, but peaked at number six on the Single Tip chart.)	―	16	―	―	―	―	―	―	―		Origo
"Inside Our Hearts" (with Alesso featuring Shaun Farrugia)	2025	― (Note: "Inside Our Hearts" did not enter the Dutch Single Top 100, but peaked at number 27 on the Single Tip chart.)	―	―	―	―	―	―	―	―	―		Origo
"Sleepless Nights" (with Armin van Buuren featuring Libby Whitehouse)	2025	― (Note: "Sleepless Nights" did not enter the Dutch Single Top 100, but peaked at number 15 on the Single Tip chart.)	―	―	―	―	―	―	―	―	―		Origo
"Set Me Free" (with Arcando featuring Bonn)	2025	―	―	―	―	―	―	―	―	―	―		Origo
"Peace of Flood" (with Sebastian Ingrosso and Citadelle)	2025	―	―	―	―	―	―	―	―	―	―		Non-album single
"Voodoo" (with R3hab and Skytech)	2025	―	―	―	―	―	―	―	―	―	―		Origo
"Butterflies" (with Matisse & Sadko featuring Barbz)	2025	―	―	―	―	―	―	―	―	―	―		Origo
"Ain't Letting You Down" (with Saksham featuring Scott Quinn)	2025	―	―	―	―	―	―	―	―	―	―		Origo
"Catharina"	2026	― (Note: "Catharina" did not enter the Dutch Single Top 100, but peaked at number 13 on the Single Tip chart.)	―	―	―	―	―	―	―	―	―		Marty
"Repeat It" (with Ed Sheeran)	2026	― (Note: "Repeat It" did not enter the Dutch Single Top 100, but peaked at number six on the Single Tip chart.)	―	22	93	―	―	― (Note: "Repeat It" did not enter the NZ Top 40 Singles Chart, but peaked at number 16 on the NZ Hot Singles Chart.)	―	85	―		Marty
"Fireflies" (with U2)	2026	— (Note: "Fireflies" did not enter the Dutch Single Top 100, but peaked at number 30 on the Single Tip chart.)	—	—	—	—	—	― (Note: "Fireflies" did not enter the NZ Top 40 Singles Chart, but peaked at number 26 on the NZ Hot 40 Singles Chart.)	—	—	—		Marty
"This Dream of You"	2026	— (Note: "This Dream of You" did not enter the Dutch Single Top 100, but peaked at number 27 on the Single Tip chart.)	—	—	—	—	—	―	—	—	—		Marty
"—" denotes a recording that did not chart or was not released in that territory.

== Other songs ==
List of other songs, with selected chart positions, showing year released and album name
Title	Year	Peak chart positions		Album
Title	Year	NZ Hot	UK Sales	Album
"Bizarre" (with Madonna)	2026	10	65	Confessions II

== Production and songwriting credits ==
List of production and songwriting credits as lead artist, showing original artists and year released
Title	Year	Artist(s)	Album	Involvement	Ref.
"De Wereld Rond"	2012	Yes-R	Fashion	Production; songwriting	
"Waiting for Love"	2015	Avicii	Stories	Production; songwriting	
"Clap Your Hands"	2015	David Guetta & Glowinthedark	Listen Again	Songwriting	
"Another Level"	2018	Afrojack	Press Play	Songwriting	
"Riot"	2019	Brooks & Jonas Aden	Non-album singles	Songwriting	
"Fade Away"	2019	Matisse & Sadko featuring Smbdy	Non-album singles	Songwriting	
"Your Song Saved My Life"	2021	U2	Sing 2: Original Motion; Picture Soundtrack	Production	
"Lucky Ones"	2022	Julian Lennon	Jude	Songwriting	
"Believe"	2024	Third Party	Non-album single	Songwriting	
"Screw Loose"	2024	Oliver Malcolm	When Lightning Strikes, Wear It	Songwriting	
"Paper Cuts"	2024	Woosung featuring New Vaticans	4444	Production; songwriting	
"Himalaya"	2024	Matisse & Sadko	Non-album single	Songwriting	
"Scars"	2026	U2	Easter Lily	Songwriting	
"Shallows"	2026	Lofin	Non-album single	Production	
"Glorify"	2026	U2	Carnaval de Luz	Songwriting	

== Remixes ==
List of remixes as lead artist, showing original artists and year released
Title	Year	Original artist(s)	Album	Ref.
"Intoxicated" (Martin Garrix Remix)	2011	Nick Vathorst and Maximo	Non-album remix	
"Your Body" (Martin Garrix Remix)	2012	Christina Aguilera	Lotus	
"Midnight Sun 2.0" (Martin Garrix Remix)	2012	Roy Gates	Non-album remix	
"Stellar" (Martin Garrix Remix)	2013	Daddy's Groove	Stellar (The Remixes)	
"Project T" (Martin Garrix Remix)	2013	Dimitri Vegas & Like Mike vs. Sander van Doorn	Non-album remix	
"Animals" (Victor Niglio and Martin Garrix Festival Trap Mix)	2013	Martin Garrix	Animals (Remixes)	
"Crackin" (Martin Garrix Edit)	2014	Bassjackers	Non-album remixes	
"Backlash" (Martin Garrix Edit)	2014	DubVision	Non-album remixes	
"Can't Feel My Face" (Martin Garrix Remix)	2015	The Weeknd	Beauty Behind the Madness	
"Ocean" (Martin Garrix and Cesqeaux Remix)	2018	Martin Garrix (featuring Khalid)	Ocean (Remixes Vol.1)	
"We Are the People" (Martin Garrix Remix)	2021	Martin Garrix, Bono and the Edge	Non-album remixes	
"Cocoon" (Martin Garrix and Space Ducks Remix)	2023	070 Shake	Non-album remixes	

== Releases under an alias ==
=== As Area21 (with Maejor) ===
==== Studio albums ====
List of studio albums as Area21 (with Maejor)
Title	Details
Greatest Hits, Vol. 1	Released: 12 November 2021; Label: Stmpd Rcrds, Hollywood Records; Formats: CD, vinyl, digital download, streaming

==== Singles ====
List of singles as Area21 (with Maejor) with selected chart positions, showing year released and album name
Title	Year	Peak chart positions		Album
Title	Year	US Alt.	US Dance	Album
"Spaceships"	2016	―	―	Non-album singles
"Girls"	2016	―	―	Non-album singles
"We Did It"	2017	―	―	Non-album singles
"Glad You Came"	2017	―	―	Non-album singles
"Happy"	2018	―	―	Non-album singles
"Help"	2019	―	―	Non-album singles
"La La La"	2021	28	―	Greatest Hits Vol. 1
"Pogo"	2021	―	―	Greatest Hits Vol. 1
"Mona Lisa"	2021	―	―	Greatest Hits Vol. 1
"Lovin' Every Minute"	2021	―	30	Greatest Hits Vol. 1
"Followers"	2021	―	31	Greatest Hits Vol. 1
"Own the Night"	2021	―	―	Greatest Hits Vol. 1
"—" denotes a recording that did not chart or was not released in that territory.

=== As GRX ===
List of singles as GRX, with selected chart positions, showing year released and album name
Title	Year	Peak chart positions	Album
Title	Year	US Dance	Album
"Gamer" (with Bassjackers)	2013	―	Non-album singles
"Psycho" (with Yellow Claw and Cesqeaux)	2013	―	Non-album singles
"Can't You See" (with Shermanology)	2014	―	Non-album singles
"Boomerang" (with Brooks)	2017	―	Non-album singles
"X's" (with CMC$ featuring Icona Pop)	2018	36	Non-album singles
"Restart Your Heart" (with Florian Picasso)	2020	—	Non-album singles
"Far Away" (with Florian Picasso)	2021	—	Héritage
"No More" (with Vluarr and Thomas Nan featuring Zana)	2023	—	Non-album singles
"Empire" (with Nuzb)	2024	—	Non-album singles
"—" denotes a recording that did not chart or was not released in that territory.

=== As Ytram ===
List of singles as Ytram, with selected chart positions, showing year released and album name
Title	Year	Peak chart positions	Album
Title	Year	US Dance	Album
"Make You Mine" (with Bleu Clair featuring RA)	2020	―	Non-album single
"Fire" (with Elderbrook)	2020	30	Why Do We Shake in the Cold?
"Alive" (with Citadelle)	2020	―	Pilot
"The Game" (with Ladanza)	2024	―	Non-album singles
"I Don't Know Your Name (The Wire)" (with CMC$ and Malarkey)	2024	―	Non-album singles
"—" denotes a recording that did not chart or was not released in that territory.

== Music videos ==
List of music videos, showing year released, directors and references
Title	Year	Director(s)	Ref.
"Bfam" (with Julian Jordan)	2012	Mark Loonen	
"Animals"	2013	Mark Loonen	
"Wizard" (with Jay Hardway)	2013	Mark Loonen	
"Tremor" (with Dimitri Vegas & Like Mike)	2014	Unknown	
"Gold Skies" (with Sander van Doorn and Dvbbs featuring Aleesia)	2014	Aap Noot Film	
"Turn Up the Speakers" (with Afrojack)	2014	Unknown	
"Gold Skies" (Tiësto remix) (with Sander van Doorn and Dvbbs featuring Aleesia)"	2014	Unknown	
"Gold Skies" (DubVision remix) (with Sander van Doorn and Dvbbs featuring Aleesia)"	2014	Unknown	
"Virus (How About Now)" (with MOTi)	2014	Unknown	
"Forbidden Voices"	2015	Unknown	
"Don't Look Down" (Towel Girl) (featuring Usher)	2015	Petros	
"Don't Look Down" (Towel Boy) (featuring Usher)	2015	Petros	
"The Only Way Is Up" (with Tiësto)	2015	Unknown	
"Dragon" (with Matisse & Sadko)	2015	Laban	
"Break Through the Silence" (with Matisse & Sadko)	2015	Laban	
"Set Me Free" (with Dillon Francis)	2015	Unknown	
"Bouncybob" (with Justin Mylo and Mesto)	2015	Unknown	
"Now That I've Found You" (featuring John Martin and Michel Zitron)	2016	Peter Huang	
"Lions in the Wild" (with Third Party)	2016	Giaro Giarratana, Damian Karsznia	(Note: Adapted from Martin Garrix's channel on YouTube.)
"In the Name of Love" (with Bebe Rexha)	2016	Emil Nava	
"Wiee" (with Mesto)	2016	Unknown	
"Sun Is Never Going Down" (featuring Dawn Golden)	2016	Unknown	
"Spotless" (with Jay Hardway)	2016	Unknown	
"Hold On & Believe" (featuring The Federal Empire)	2016	Unknown	
"Welcome" (with Julian Jordan)	2016	Unknown	
"Together" (with Matisse & Sadko)	2016	Unknown	
"Make Up Your Mind" (with Florian Picasso)	2016	Unknown	
"Scared to Be Lonely" (with Dua Lipa)	2017	Blake Claridge	
"Byte" (with Brooks)	2017	Damian Karsznia	
"Scared to Be Lonely" (acoustic) (with Dua Lipa)	2017	Unknown	
"There for You" (with Troye Sivan)	2017	Jordan Taylor Wright	
"Pizza"	2017	Unknown	
"Forever" (with Matisse & Sadko)	2017	Damian Karsznia	
"So Far Away" (with David Guetta featuring Jamie Scott and Romy Dya)	2017	Damian Karsznia	
"Game Over" (with Loopers)	2018	Unknown	
"Ocean" (featuring Khalid)	2018	Damian Karsznia	
"High on Life" (featuring Bonn)	2018	Damian Karsznia	
"Burn Out" (with Justin Mylo featuring Dewain Whitmore)	2018	Damian Karsznia	
"Breach (Walk Alone)" (with Blinders)	2018	Damian Karsznia	
"Yottabyte"	2018	Damian Karsznia	
"Latency" (with Dyro)	2018	Damian Karsznia	
"Access"	2018	Damian Karsznia	
"Waiting for Tomorrow" (with Pierce Fulton featuring Mike Shinoda)	2018	Damian Karsznia	
"Dreamer" (featuring Mike Yung)	2018	Unknown	
"Glitch" (with Julian Jordan)	2018	Damian Karsznia	
"No Sleep" (featuring Bonn)	2019	Damian Karsznia, Olav Stubberud	
"Mistaken" (with Matisse & Sadko featuring Alex Aris)	2019	Damian Karsznia	
"Summer Days" (featuring Macklemore and Patrick Stump)	2019	Colin Tilley	
"These Are the Times" (featuring JRM)	2019	Ivana Bobic	
"Home" (featuring Bonn)	2019	Damian Karsznia	
"Used to Love" (with Dean Lewis)	2019	Unknown	
"Hold On" (with Matisse & Sadko featuring Michel Zitron)	2019	Unknown	
"Used to Love" (acoustic) (with Dean Lewis)	2020	Unknown	
"Drown" (featuring Clinton Kane)	2020	Unknown	
"Higher Ground" (featuring John Martin)	2020	Unknown	
"Pressure" (featuring Tove Lo)	2021	Philip Hovensjö, Olle Knutson	
"We Are the People" (featuring Bono and the Edge)	2021	Olle Knutson	
"We Are the People" (Martin Garrix remix) (featuring Bono and the Edge)	2021	Unknown	
"Love Runs Out" (featuring G-Eazy and Sasha Alex Sloan)	2021	Damian Karsznia	
"Diamonds" (with Julian Jordan and Tinie Tempah)	2021	Unknown	
"Follow" (with Zedd)	2022	Damian Karsznia	
"Limitless" (with Mesto)	2022	Damian Karsznia	
"Reboot" (with Vluarr)	2022	Damian Karsznia	
"Quantum" (with Brooks)	2022	Damian Karsznia	
"Good Morning" (with Matisse & Sadko)	2022	Damian Karsznia	
"Starlight (Keep Me Afloat)" (with DubVision featuring Shaun Farrugia)	2022	Damian Karsznia	
"Funk" (with Julian Jordan)	2022	Damian Karsznia	
"Find You" (with Justin Mylo featuring Dewain Whitmore)	2022	Damian Karsznia	
"Aurora" (with Blinders)	2022	Damian Karsznia	
"Oxygen" (with DubVision featuring Jordan Grace)	2022	Damian Karsznia	
"If We'll Ever Be Remembered" (with Shaun Farrugia)	2022	Damian Karsznia	
"Loop" (with DallasK featuring Sasha Alex Sloan)	2022	Damian Karsznia	
"Something" (with Breathe Carolina)	2022	Unknown	
"Hero" (with Jvke)	2022	Tim McCourt, Max Taylor	
"Hurricane" (with Sentinel featuring Bonn)	2023	Damian Karsznia	
"Real Love" (with Lloyiso)	2023	Olle Knutson	
"Carry You" (with Third Party featuring Oaks and Declan J Donovan)	2024	Unknown	
"Breakaway" (with Mesto featuring Wilhelm)	2024	Unknown	
"Biochemical" (with Seth Hills)	2024	Unknown	
"Empty" (with DubVision featuring Jaimes)	2024	Unknown	
"Wherever You Are" (with DubVision featuring Shaun Farrugia)	2024	Mathias Normann	
"Smile" (featuring Carolina Liar)	2024	Mathias Normann	
"Gravity" (with Sem Vox featuring Jaimes)	2024	Mathias Normann	
"Told You So" (with Jex)	2024	Mathias Normann	
"Told You So" (Live at AMF 2024) (with Jex)	2024	Unknown	
"Told You So" (acoustic version) (with Jex)	2025	Andrew Angel	
"Angels for Each Other" (with Arijit Singh)	2025	Mathias Normann, Damian Karsznia	
"Weightless" (with Arijit Singh)	2025	Bijoy Shetty	
"Mad" (with Lauv)	2025	Mathias Normann	
"Peace of Mind" (with Citadelle)	2025	Unknown	
"Our Time" (with Afrojack, David Guetta and Amél)	2025	Unknown	
"Inside Our Hearts" (with Alesso featuring Shaun Farrugia)	2025	Unknown	
"Set Me Free" (with Arcando featuring Bonn)	2025	Mathias Normann	
"Sleepless Nights" (with Armin van Buuren featuring Libby Whitehouse)	2025	Unknown	
"Set Me Free" (Live at Gunnersbury Park, London 2025) (with Arcando featuring Bonn)	2025	Fraser Hawkshaw	
"Voodoo" (with R3hab and Skytech)	2025	Pablo	
"Butterflies" (with Matisse & Sadko featuring Barbz)	2025	Unknown	
"Ain't Letting You Down" (with Saksham featuring Scott Quinn)	2025	Pablo Andres Gracia	
"Catharina"	2026	Jip Duffhuis	
"Repeat It" (with Ed Sheeran)	2026	Liam Pethick	
"Repeat It" (acoustic version) (with Ed Sheeran)	2026	Nic Minns, Liam Pethick	
"Fireflies" (with U2)	2026	Unknown	
as Area21 (with Maejor)
"Glad You Came"	2017	Unknown	
"Happy"	2018	Unknown	
"Help"	2019	Unknown	
"La La La"	2021	Jeremy Polgar	
"Pogo"	2021	Jeremy Polgar	
"La La La" (Storyboard Animation)	2021	Jeremy Polgar	
"Mona Lisa"	2021	Jeremy Polgar	
"Pogo" (Storyboard Animation)	2021	Jeremy Polgar	
"Lovin' Every Minute"	2021	Jeremy Polgar	
"Mona Lisa" (Storyboard Animation)	2021	Jeremy Polgar	
"Followers"	2021	Jeremy Polgar	
"Own the Night"	2021	Jeremy Polgar	
"Time Machine"	2021	Jeremy Polgar	
"La La La" (Live on Planet Earth)	2023	Job Robbers	(Note: Adapted from AREA21's channel on YouTube.)
"Spaceships" (Live on Planet Earth)	2023	Job Robbers	
"Human" (Live on Planet Earth)	2023	Job Robbers	
"We Did It" (Live on Planet Earth)	2023	Job Robbers	
as GRX
"Can't You See" (with Shermanology)	2014	Unknown	
"Boomerang" (with Brooks)	2017	Damian Karsznia	
"X's" (with CMC$ featuring Icona Pop)	2018	Damian Karsznia	
"Restart Your Heart" (with Florian Picasso)	2020	Unknown	
"Far Away" (with Florian Picasso)	2021	Loïc Schütz	
as Ytram
"Fire" (with Elderbrook)	2020	Damian Karsznia	
"Alive" (with Citadelle)	2020	Unknown	

== Notes ==
Credits
