= Sleepless Nights (Armin van Buuren and Martin Garrix song) =

2025 single by Armin van Buuren and Martin Garrix

Single by Armin van Buuren and Martin Garrix featuring Libby Whitehouse

from the album Origo
- Released: 8 August 2025
- Genre: Eurotrance
- Length: 3:00
- Label: Armada; Stmpd
- Songwriters: Armin van Buuren; Martijn Garritsen; Shaun Farrugia; Danny Shah; Dom Lyttle; Libby Whitehouse
- Producers: Armin van Buuren; Martin Garrix; Arjen Thonen

"Sleepless Nights" is a song by Dutch DJs and record producers Armin van Buuren and Martin Garrix, featuring vocals by English singer Libby Whitehouse. It was released on 8 August 2025 through Armada Music and Stmpd Rcrds. The song was later included on Garrix's 2025 EP Origo.

== Background and release ==
"Sleepless Nights" marked the first released collaboration between van Buuren and Garrix. The track premiered live during Garrix's performances at Ultra Music Festival 2025 in Miami and was later played in both artists' solo DJ sets.

Musically, the song combines van Buuren's trance style with Garrix's pop-oriented EDM production and Whitehouse's vocal performance. It was issued as a one-track digital single on 8 August 2025, with copyright credited to Armada Music B.V. and STMPD RCRDS B.V. An extended mix was also released digitally.

== Reception ==
"Sleepless Nights" received attention from electronic music outlets for bringing together van Buuren's trance background with Garrix's festival-oriented EDM production. The song combines euphoric trance elements with pop-leaning EDM production and Whitehouse's vocal performance. Its production includes 138 BPM rolling kick drums, a nostalgic trance breakdown, Garrix's synth work and an anthemic vocal hook from Whitehouse. The track also drew festival attention after its live debut at Ultra Music Festival in Miami and later appearances in both artists' DJ sets.

== Track listing ==
Digital download and streaming
No.	Title	Length
1.	"Sleepless Nights" (featuring Libby Whitehouse)	3:00

Digital download and streaming – extended mix
No.	Title	Length
1.	"Sleepless Nights" (extended mix) (featuring Libby Whitehouse)	4:04

== Credits and personnel ==
Credits are adapted from Shazam.

- Armin van Buuren – producer, writer
- Martijn Garritsen – producer, writer
- Libby Whitehouse – vocals, writer
- Danny Shah – writer
- Dom Lyttle – writer
- Shaun Farrugia – writer
- Arjen Thonen – producer

== Charts ==
Chart (2025)	Peak position
Netherlands Single Tip (Dutch Charts)	15
Netherlands Tipparade (Dutch Top 40)	17
