= Brohug =

Swedish DJ and production trio

- Origin: Stockholm, Sweden
- Genres: Bass house; brohouse; future house; tech house; deep house
- Labels: Spinnin'; Confession; Musical Freedom; Dim Mak; Heldeep; Good Enuff
- Members: Christopher Lunde; John Dahlbäck; Niklas Lunde

Brohug (also stylized as BROHUG), is a Swedish DJ and production trio, consisting of Christopher Lunde, John Dahlbäck and Niklas Lunde.

== Background ==
Coming together as DJs from different shows, Brohug was formed when the three members became friends and collaborated.

In July 2016, their debut single on Tchami's label Confession was released with the title "In the Morning".

In January 2017, Dim Mak released a 2-song EP of Brohug titled Giggle Juice, which is a follow to their previous two works Guerilla and the Marshall EP. Their other EP release on Dim Mak is titled Knuckles. In March, Brohug released a remix of the Alesso song "Falling". In May, they released "If I'm Wrong", a single on Tchami's record label Confession. In June, a song was released by Brohug titled "Ballin" as a free download. In August, Brohug remixed the Martin Garrix song "There For You", which was included in the song's official remix pack. On the 4th of August, they released an EP on Dim Mak Records, titled The Streets. In September, they collaborated with producer Autoerotique for the single "Brains", which was released on Spinnin' Records.

On November 17, 2017, they released the song "Boogieman" on Steve Aoki's label Dim Mak.

On November 25, 2017, they released "Ambush" as a single on the Tiesto label Musical Freedom. In December, they released "Be BROHUG" as a single. It features the vocal sample of "Rock the Party" which was also used in a Jauz song.

== Partial discography ==
Notable works include:

=== Singles ===
2020

- "Brake" (with Saint Punk)
- "Gold On My Crown" (featuring Born I)
- "1990" (with Kaskade)

2018

- "Fun" (with Kaskade and Mr. Tape)

=== Remixes ===
2017

- Alesso – "Falling"
- Rob & Jack – "El Chupacabra"
- Martin Garrix and Troye Sivan – "There For You"
- Late Night Alumni and Kaskade – "Love Song"
- Major Lazer featuring Travis Scott, Camila Cabello and Quavo – "Know No Better"
- Martin Solveig featuring Alma – "All Stars"
- Quix featuring Nevve – "Riot Call"

2018

- Danny Avila and The Vamps featuring Machine Gun Kelly - "Too Good To Be True"
