= Waiting for Tomorrow =

Waiting for Tomorrow may refer to:

- "Waiting for Tomorrow", a 2011 song by Mandisa from What If We Were Real
- "Waiting for Tomorrow" (Martin Garrix and Pierce Fulton song), a 2018 song from the album Bylaw
