= Yottabyte (song) =

Single by Martin Garrix

from the EP Bylaw
- Released: 17 October 2018
- Genre: Progressive house, electro house
- Length: 3:30
- Label: Stmpd; Epic Amsterdam; Sony Netherlands
- Songwriters: Martin Garrix; Hardwell
- Producers: Martin Garrix; Hardwell

Martin Garrix singles chronology
"Breach (Walk Alone)" (2018)	"Yottabyte" (2018)	"Latency" (2018)

"Yottabyte" is a song by Dutch DJ Martin Garrix. It was released on 17 October 2018 via his Stmpd Rcrds label that is exclusively licensed to Sony Music Netherlands. It is the second single from Garrix's Bylaw EP.

== Background ==
"Yottabyte" is released as part of Garrix's Bylaw EP daily single release that had begun on 14 October 2018. The single single of the EP, it was released on 16 October 2018, succeeding Breach (Walk Alone) that was released a day before. The song is described as a "gorgeous emotional ballad of a banger," without vocals and with synth chord progressions.

== Composition ==
Beginning with a "playful, jewelry box-like melody", the song is noted for Garrix's signature sound, which are elements of his progressive house style. An electro house song with "pretty melodies", it consists of "wide synths and massive kicks that open the record in a sort of relaxing breakdown." The sounds are described as having elements from past Garrix songs such as "Pizza", "Spotless" (which appears to have the same plucked-synth as "Yottabyte"), "Scared to Be Lonely" and "Animals".

The song was used as the intro during Garrix's Tomorrowland 2018 headlining set featuring an extended orchestral intro for the song of about one minute. It is musically said to have "sweet chime melody" that is "joined by a truly sumptuous string arrangement in the intro as the tension builds."
