= Access (song) =

Single by Martin Garrix

from the EP Bylaw
- Released: 17 October 2018
- Recorded: 2016
- Length: 3:15 (album edit); 4:01 (first version)
- Label: Stmpd; Epic Amsterdam; Sony Netherlands
- Songwriter: Martijn Garritsen
- Producer: Martin Garrix

Martin Garrix singles chronology
"Latency" (2018)	"Access" (2018)	"Waiting for Tomorrow" (2018)

Music video
- "Access" on YouTube

"Access" is a song by Dutch DJ and record producer Martin Garrix. It was released on 17 October 2018, via Garrix's Stmpd label which is exclusively licensed to Epic Amsterdam, a division of Sony Music. It is the fourth single from his Bylaw EP.

== Background ==
Described as "a solo effort and an instrumental built from bold beats and bright, colorful synth melodies," the song is musically compared to previous Garrix singles such as "Forbidden Voices" and "Oops". Released few days before Garrix's third appearance at the Amsterdam Dance Event, the song's synth melody is noted as "vaguely melancholic" and "ballad of the bunch", a reference to its inclusion the Bylaw EP. Originally dubbed by fans as "Chinatown", the song is described as "unimaginably happy and upbeat."

"Access" was first played by Garrix in a live stream on his YouTube channel on 9 February 2017 while in his Los Angeles studio. It was premiered during his Ultra Music Festival performance in 2017 and was played multiple times until July.

== Music video ==
In the music video, written and directed by Damian Karsznia, an adventure by the protagonist, whose "physical form is absent for most of the video" but is represented by an avatar, into the human brain is shown. He attempts to achieve his ultimate goal by going through various simulated environments.

Billboard described it as a "deep dive into the human brain, which is a lot like a computer...a psychedelic wonderland where tiny humans run around on gridded surfaces between towering heads. It's still got that old-school cybernetic aesthetic, it's just been internalized." Production of the music video is credited to Joris Hoevenberg and Alex Rijkschroeff as executives with assistant producers Petra Courtz, Shenelva Booij. Ihor Bliusovych, the main model, has appeared in all of the videos for singles in Bylaw. (Note: Credits are adapted from the description in the music video on YouTube.)
