= Game Over (Martin Garrix and Loopers song) =

Single by Martin Garrix and Loopers
- Released: 20 April 2018
- Genre: Electro house
- Length: 2:35
- Label: Stmpd; Epic Amsterdam; Sony Netherlands
- Songwriters: Martijn Garritsen; Khazar Hamidian
- Producers: Martin Garrix; Loopers; Aydin Vance

Martin Garrix singles chronology
"Like I Do" (2018)	"Game Over" (2018)	"Ocean" (2018)

Loopers singles chronology
"Pika Pika" (2018)	"Game Over" (2018)	"All On You" (2018)

"Game Over" is a song by Dutch DJs and record producers Martin Garrix and Loopers. It was released on 20 April 2018 via Garrix's Netherlands-based record label Stmpd Rcrds.

== Background ==
Consisting of a softer drop, "Game Over" was first premiered at the 2017 Tomorrowland Music Festival. Garrix announced the track's release through his social media accounts.

== Charts ==
Chart (2018)	Peak position
US Hot Dance/Electronic Songs (Billboard)	44
