= Breach (Walk Alone) =

Single by Martin Garrix and Blinders

from the EP Bylaw
- Released: 16 October 2018
- Genre: Electro house
- Length: 2:58
- Label: Stmpd; Epic Amsterdam; Sony Netherlands
- Songwriters: Martijn Garritsen; Mateusz Owsiak; Ilsey Juber; Dewain Whitmore
- Producers: Martin Garrix; Blinders

Martin Garrix singles chronology
"Burn Out" (2018)	"Breach (Walk Alone)" (2018)	"Yottabyte" (2018)

Blinders singles chronology
"Leaving" (2018)	"Breach (Walk Alone)" (2018)	"Fire" (2018)

Music video
- "Breach (Walk Alone)" on YouTube

"Breach (Walk Alone)" is a song by Dutch DJ and record producer Martin Garrix and Polish DJ Blinders, The song was written by Garrix, Blinders,Dewain Whitmore and Ilsey Juber, With Juber Performing Uncredited Vocals. It is released via Stmpd label which is exclusively licensed to Epic Amsterdam, a division of Sony Music. and is included in Garrix's five-track Bylaw EP.

== Background ==
Described as a "pulsing, industrial electro-house tune," the song is described as taking Garrix back to his "electro roots". Initially, the song was revealed on a mysterious website that published an artwork detailing songs from the now-released Plus EP. Among the songs was Breach (Walk Alone), that has been released as the first single from the EP and the first of five songs for a series of daily releases that had begun on 15 October 2018. With elements of big room house, the song is composed of a "synth melody rife with tension builds up to a drop" and vocals of a female singer. The song was premiered at the Tomorrowland 2018 festival during Garrix's stage performance.

The song was described as "powered by a lead line that recalls classic hard house, it's an enormous slab of electro house with a sweet female vocal at its core. A serious fist-pumper of a track, it's been one of the most sought-after tracks in the scene since Garrix dropped it on Tomorrowland." Consisting of two builds, it follows with a huge drop with bass sounds and synths.

== Music video ==
In the music video written and directed by Damian Karsznia, Garrix and Blinders make a cameo appearance. The video is noted for its late-nineties "concepts of crypto-apocalypse". It features the main model (Ihor Bliusovych) battling his way through a red and blue "virtual-obsessed" world. The credits feature cinematographer Julian Lomaga, script editors Mees Roozen, David Haringsma and Rick Batenburg, and editors Dieko Mirza, Damian Karsznia and Mees Roozen.

The video was noted for having "Scanner Darkly-esque visuals that feature Garrix along with a number of unidentified individuals in what seems to be a drug-fueled nightclub experience."
