= Turn Up the Speakers =

Single by Afrojack and Martin Garrix
- Released: 25 August 2014
- Genre: Big room house
- Length: 5:43
- Label: Spinnin'; Wall
- Songwriters: Afrojack; Martin Garrix
- Producers: Afrojack; Martin Garrix

Afrojack singles chronology
"Dynamite" (2014)	"Turn Up the Speakers" (2014)	"Hey Mama" (2015)

Martin Garrix singles chronology
"Gold Skies" (2014)	"Turn Up the Speakers" (2014)	"Set Me Free" (2014)

"Turn Up the Speakers" is a song written, produced and performed by Dutch DJs and record producers Afrojack and Martin Garrix. It was released as a digital download on 25 August 2014 on Beatport and on 22 September 2014 on iTunes, and marks the first collaborative work between the two artists. The track has charted in Austria, Belgium and the Netherlands.

== Music video ==
A music video to accompany the release of "Turn Up the Speakers" was first released onto YouTube on 25 August 2014 at a total length of three minutes and nine seconds. The music video was uploaded by Spinnin' Records Youtube channel.

== Chart performance ==
Chart (2014)	Peak position
Austria (Ö3 Austria Top 40)	57
Belgium (Ultratop 50 Flanders)	44
Belgium (Ultratip Bubbling Under Wallonia)	15
Netherlands (Single Top 100)	50
Poland Dance (ZPAV)	43
US Hot Dance/Electronic Songs (Billboard)	20

== Release history ==
Region	Date	Format	Label
Netherlands	22 September 2014	Digital download	Spinnin'
