= Dreamer (Martin Garrix song) =

Single by Martin Garrix featuring Mike Yung
- Released: 1 November 2018
- Recorded: 2018
- Studio: Stmpd Recording Studio, Amsterdam, Netherlands
- Genre: Dance-pop
- Length: 3:13
- Label: Stmpd; Epic Amsterdam; Sony Netherlands
- Songwriters: Martijn Gerard Garritsen; Mike Yung; Ilsey Juber; Brian Lee
- Producers: Martin Garrix; Matisse & Sadko

Martin Garrix singles chronology
"Waiting for Tomorrow" (2018)	"Dreamer" (2018)	"Glitch" (2018)

Mike Yung singles chronology
"Alright" (2018)	"Dreamer" (2018)

Music video
- "Dreamer" on YouTube

"Dreamer" is a song by Dutch DJ and record producer Martin Garrix. Released as a single on 1 November 2018 alongside its music video, it features American soul singer Mike Yung. The song is dedicated to his wife Lydia, who had died earlier in 2018.

== Background ==
Garrix announced in August 2018, a potential collaboration with Yung. In an interview, he spoke about working with Yung, who is also a street artist, and how he was impressed by his voice. Garrix said "He's an amazing singer. I've seen him on video, singing in the subway New York. His story ... he has been singing in the subway for 38 years. I invited him to Amsterdam, we had an amazing week, wrote music on a boat with a guitar."

Yung also discussed how he was astonished by Garrix's interest to work with "a 60-year-old man" like him. He tweeted "This guy ... could work with anyone. Why he chose to work with a 60 yr old like me was always confusing ... Martin thank u for the opportunity, and I love you, man."

== Composition ==
The song is described as embodying "the uplifting feel that characterizes his return to the spotlight, filled with hope and empowerment and positivity, with his soulful delivery searing over a euphoric Garrix pop production." The song concludes with "gospel-style choir harmonies." Noted as being "stylistically new for Garrix," it consists of "melding pop sounds with R&B vocals and an almost blues-like attitude." The song features a crescendo with backing vocalists.

Consisting of "Yung's uplifting singing and Garrix's commanding retro electronic notes that build into the chorus with gospel-style choir harmonies", the meaning of the song is stated as being "a motivational song about chasing your dreams".

== Music video ==
The music video, distributed to YouTube on the same day as an individual single, featured Yung performing the song in the New York City Subway where he started his street artist career.

The scene progresses Yung to his later projects in Brooklyn and his eventual meeting with Garrix in his studio in Amsterdam, where they recorded the song.

== Charts ==
Chart (2018)	Peak position
Belgium (Ultratip Bubbling Under Flanders)	17
Belgium (Ultratip Bubbling Under Wallonia)	31
Netherlands (Dutch Top 40)	28
Netherlands (Single Tip)	1
Sweden (Sverigetopplistan)	73
US Hot Dance/Electronic Songs (Billboard)	31

== Certifications ==
Region	Certification	Certified units/sales
Brazil (Pro-Música Brasil)	Gold	20,000^{‡}
^{‡} Sales+streaming figures based on certification alone.
