= Pierce Fulton =

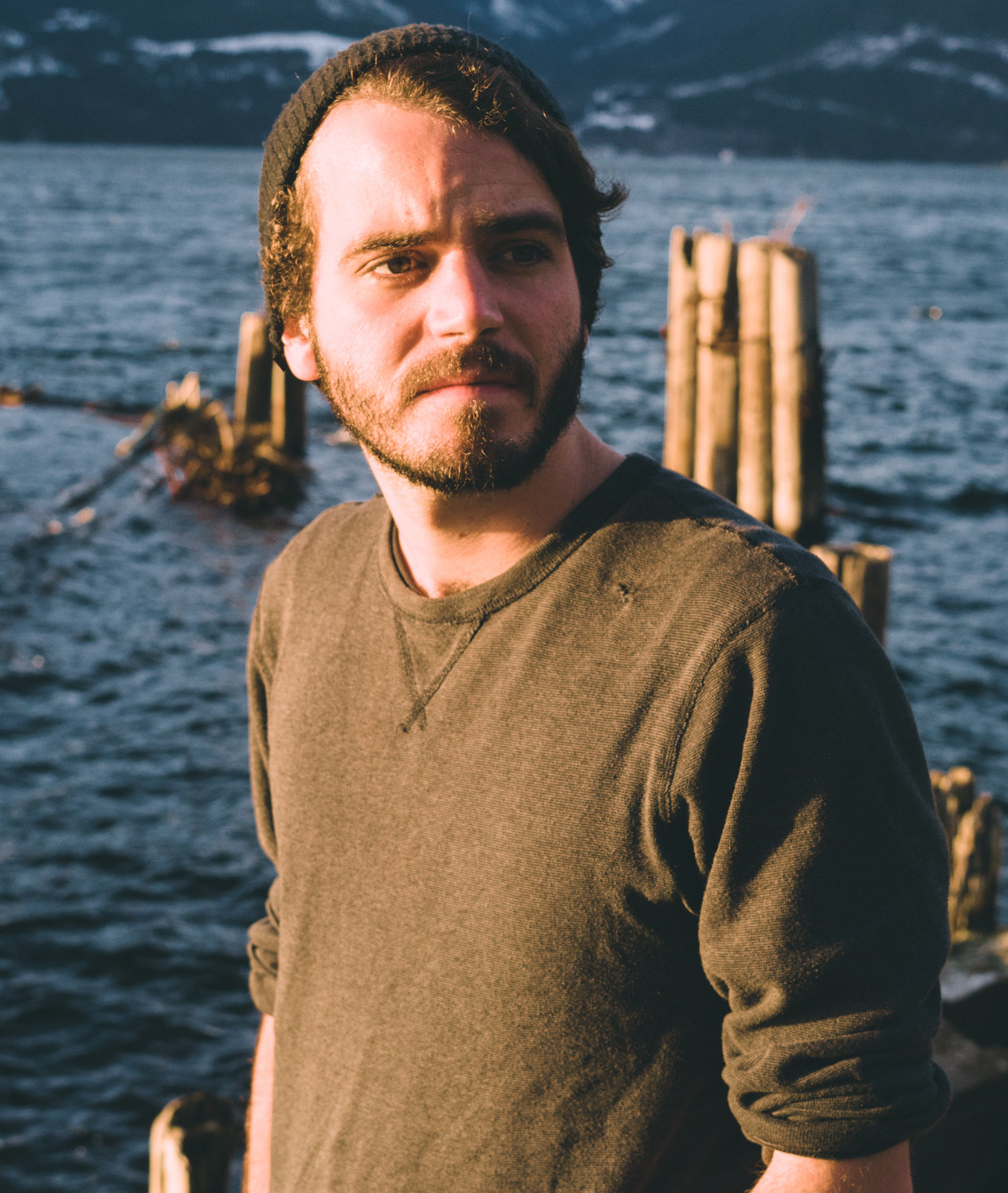
- Fulton in January 2016

Background information
- Born: Pierce Collins Fulton; June 6, 1992; Bridgeport, Connecticut, U.S.
- Origin: Stratton, Vermont, U.S.
- Died: April 29, 2021 (aged 28)
- Genres: Progressive house; electro house; indie pop
- Occupations: DJ; musician; record producer
- Instruments: Digital audio workstation; keyboard; synthesizer
- Years active: 2011–2021
- Labels: Armada; Cr2; Monstercat; Potential Fun; Stmpd Rcrds; Anjunadeep
- Formerly of: Leaving Laurel; Ansolo; Atlas Genius; Shirts & Skins; Eden; Martin Garrix; Puppet
- Website: www.piercefulton.com

Pierce Collins Fulton (June 6, 1992 – April 29, 2021) was an American DJ, and record producer. He became best known for the song “Waiting For Tomorrow”, a collaboration with Martin Garrix and Mike Shinoda from the band Linkin Park.

In 2014, Fulton's single "Runaway" topped the Billboard Emerging Artists chart. Later that year, his song "Kuaga (Lost Time)" was listed at number 38 on Billboard's Dance/Mix Show Airplay chart and used in a Smirnoff ad campaign.

He died on April 29, 2021 after struggling with mental health.

== Career ==
In 2011, Fulton released his debut EP on Cr2 Records. In 2012, Fulton toured with Wolfgang Gartner. Fulton released the Runaway EP in March 2014, the single from the album, "Runaway" reached the top spot on Billboard's Twitter Emerging Artists chart. Fulton's follow-up single, "Kuaga (Lost Time)" experienced similar success and reached 38 on the Billboard Dance/Mix Show Airplay chart.

In 2015, Fulton began releasing music on Armin Van Buuren's label Armada Music. That same year, Fulton launched a side-project called "Shirts & Skins" with actor and DJ Ansel Elgort. In July 2016, Fulton released the four song EP, Borrowed Lives.

On June 30, 2017, he released his debut album, "Better Places" following the release of singles "Life in Letters", "Home in August", "Better Places", and "Listen To Your Mama".

On October 2, 2018, his song "Wind Shear", part of his debut album "Better Places" was featured on the Horizon Pulse radio station in the video-game Forza Horizon 4.

In January 2020, Fulton and Gordon Huntley of Canadian duo Botnek introduced their Leaving Laurel alias. They released their first EP, titled Sometimes It's Scary...but It's Still You and Me / Need Little, Want Less, through Anjunadeep on January 10, 2020.

== Death ==
On May 3, 2021, Pierce's brother Griffith Fulton announced that he had died on the evening of April 29, at age 28, following struggles with mental health.

== Discography ==
=== Studio albums ===
Title	Details
Introducing Pierce Fulton	Released: December 14, 2014; Label: Cr2 Records
Better Places	Released: June 30, 2017; Label: Potential Fun
Keeping the Little Things	Released: August 14, 2020; Label: Self-released

=== Extended plays ===
Title	Details
Borrowed Lives	Released: July 22, 2016; Label: Seeking Blue Records
Hoarder's Paradise	Released: June 14, 2019; Label: Potential Fun
Back to the Nest (with Aspetuck)	Released: April 3, 2020; Label: Potential Fun
Free Fall	Released: August 7, 2020; Label: Potential Fun

=== Charted singles ===
Title	Year	Peak chart positions		Album
Title	Year	US Dance Airplay	US Dance/Electronic	Album
"Kuaga"	2014	38	—	Introducing Pierce Fulton
"Waiting for Tomorrow" (with Martin Garrix and Mike Shinoda)	2018	—	26	Bylaw
"—" denotes a recording that did not chart or was not released.

=== As lead artist ===
List of singles, showing year released and album name
Title	Year	Album
"Down"	2010	Non-album singles
"Lucid Dream / Procella"	2011	Non-album singles
"Who Wants Spaghetti?"	2012	Introducing Pierce Fulton
"Sink or Swim / Mr Mime"	2012	Introducing Pierce Fulton
"Wanna Be" (with Maor Levi)	2013	Introducing Pierce Fulton
"Where We Were" (featuring Polina)	2013	Introducing Pierce Fulton
"10/6 (That Should Do It) / West Egg"	2013	Non-album single
"Runaway"	2014	Introducing Pierce Fulton
"As You Were"	2014	Introducing Pierce Fulton
"Kuaga / Noon Gun"	2014	Introducing Pierce Fulton
"In Reality"	2015	Non-album singles
"Kuaga (Lost Time)"	2015	Non-album singles
"Landmines" (featuring J-Hart)	2015	Non-album singles
"Boy and the Beast" (with Puppet)	2015	Soft Spoken EP
"No More"	2015	Non-album singles
"False Proof"	2016	Non-album singles
"Losing You"	2016	We Are NoFace
"Make Me Blue"	2016	Borrowed Lives
"Borrowed Lives" (featuring Nvdes)	2016	Borrowed Lives
"Life in Letters"	2017	Better Places
"Home in August"	2017	Better Places
"Better Places" (featuring Nvdes)	2017	Better Places
"Listen to Your Mama"	2017	Better Places
"Overthinking Rain" (with Noosa)	2019	Non-album singles
"What Is Gonna Make You Happy?" (with Noosa)	2019	Non-album singles
"I Know (March 2015)"	2019	Hoarder's Paradise
"Old Times"	2019	Hoarder's Paradise
"Esplanade"	2020	Keeping the Little Things
"Friday Island"	2020	Keeping the Little Things

=== Remixes ===
Original artist	Title	Date	Label
Pierce Fulton	"I Know" (Pierce Fulton and Blue Mora Remix)	October 4, 2019	Potential Fun
Bo Diddley	"Can't Judge"	November 9, 2017	Self-released
Echos	"All I Want"	March 1, 2016	Echos
Pierce Fulton	"No More"	January 22, 2016	Armada Music B.V
Life of Dillon	"Overload"	October 23, 2015	Life of Dillon
Eden	"Nocturne"	October 12, 2015	Seeking Blue Records
Goldhouse	"FeelGood"	December 4, 2014	Goldhouse
Cash Cash	"Surrender"	November 24, 2014	Big Beat Records
Above & Beyond featuring Alex Vargas	"Sticky Fingers"	July 18, 2014	Anjunabeats
Tritonal featuring Phoebe Ryan	"Now or Never"	November 18, 2013	Enhanced
Dada Life	"Boing Clash Boom"	June 3, 2013	So Much Dada
Steve Aoki featuring Polina	"Come With Me"	February 19, 2013	Ultra Music
Usher	"Scream"	August 21, 2012	RCA Records
Felix Cartal	"Domo"	February 21, 2012	Dim Mak Records
Rob & Jak featuring Emil	"All My Love"	December 29, 2011	WeRecommendRecords
Chuckie	"What Happens in Vegas"	December 12, 2011	Cr2 Records
Mync, Ron Carroll and Dan Castro	"Don't be Afraid"	August 28, 2011	Cr2 Records
Fabian Gray featuring Emanuele	"When U Fall"	July 29, 2011	Neon Records

=== Music videos ===
List of music videos as lead artist, showing year released and directors
Title	Year	Director(s)
"Kuaga (Live Version)"	2015	Arthur Valverde
"Borrowed Lives" (featuring Nvdes)	2016	Rob Wadleigh
