= Mike Yung =

American singer (born 1959)

- Born: Michael Young; November 15, 1960 (age 65); New York, New York, United States
- Genres: R&B

Michael Young (better known as Mike Yung) is an American singer from New York City. He competed on America's Got Talent season 12 and made it to the semifinals. He released his debut album, I Will Never Give Up, in 2018.

== Career ==
=== Before America's Got Talent ===
Mike Yung sang at New York City Subway stations before his career on America's Got Talent. In 2016, a video of him in a subway station singing The Righteous Brothers' "Unchained Melody" went viral. The video was viewed over 2 million times in one week. He performed the song on The Late Late Show with James Corden to promote it as the lead single of his album.

=== America's Got Talent ===
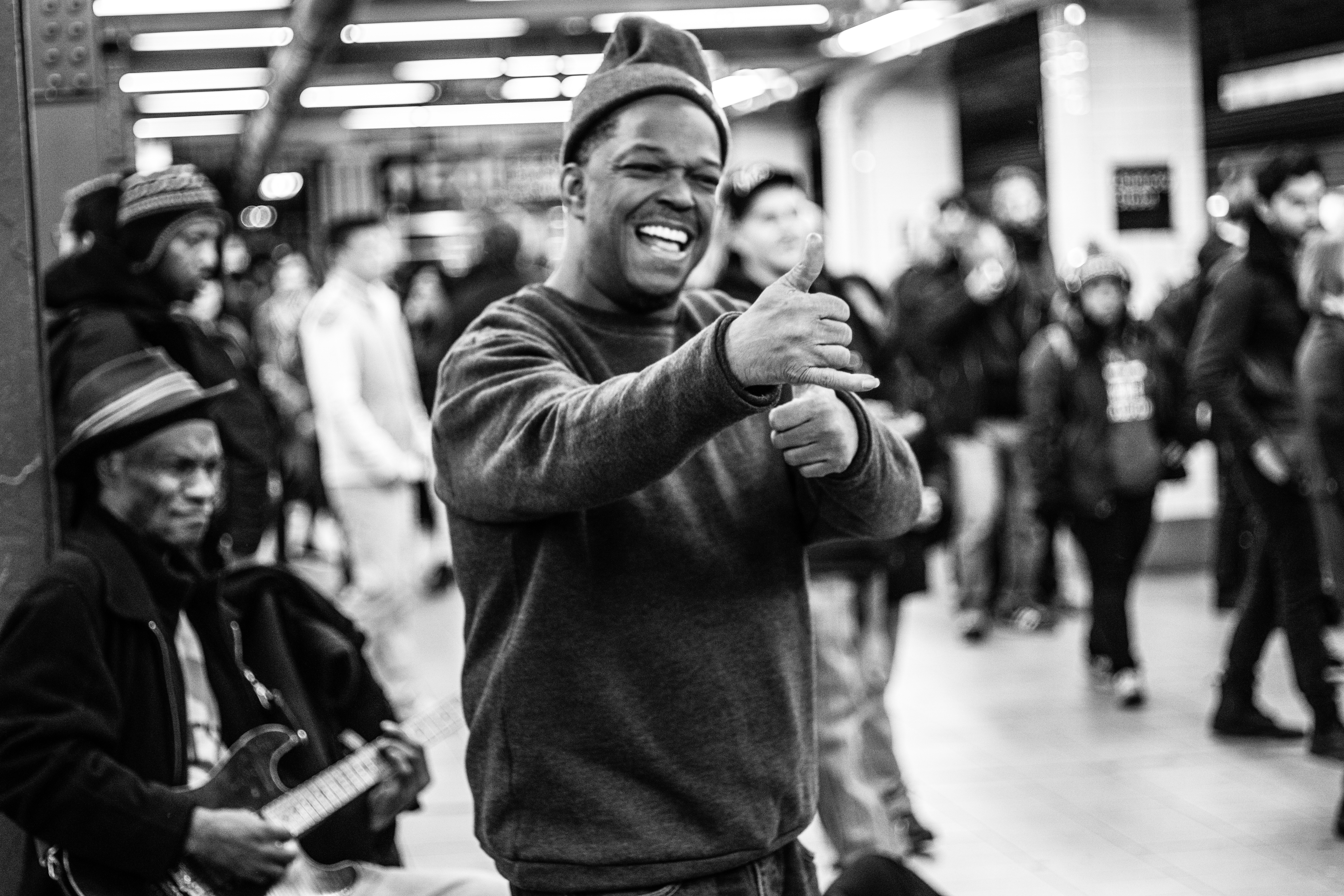
Mike Yung singing in a New York City subway station in 2017

Yung passed the audition for America's Got Talent and made it to the quarterfinals. He performed "Thinking Out Loud" by Ed Sheeran in the quarterfinals. Yung was eliminated in the semifinals where he performed " Don't Give Up on Me" by Solomon Burke.

=== After America's Got Talent ===
Yung released "Alright" as a single on January 12, 2018, along with a lyric video. On March 2, 2018, Yung announced a Kickstarter fundraiser for the album, where he had raised $90,000, enough for an EP, as of October 2018.

On July 28, 2018, Yung started his Never Give Up Tour.

In August 2018, Dutch DJ/producer Martin Garrix confirmed in an interview to be working with Yung on a new song, which was released on November 1, 2018, titled "Dreamer". The song paid tribute to Mike's late wife Lydia, who had died earlier that year.

Yung appears as himself in the short film The Singers, released in 2025. The film won Best Live Action Short Film at the 98th Academy Awards.

== Discography ==
=== Singles ===
Title	Year	Peak chart positions				Album
Title	Year	BEL	NED	SWE	US Dance	Album
"Change Is Gonna Come"	2016	—	—	—	—	Non-album singles
"Unchained Melody"	2017	—	—	—	—	Non-album singles
"Alright"	2018	—	39	—	—	Never Give Up
"Dreamer"(with Martin Garrix)	2018	17	28	72	31	Never Give Up
"—" denotes a single that did not chart or was not released in that territory.
