= There for You (Martin Garrix and Troye Sivan song) =

Single by Martin Garrix and Troye Sivan
- Released: 25 May 2017
- Recorded: 2017
- Genre: Electropop
- Length: 3:41
- Label: Stmpd; Epic Amsterdam; Sony Netherlands
- Songwriters: Brett McLaughlin; Martijn Garritsen; Ben Burgess; William Lobban Bean; Troye Sivan Mellet; Jessie Thomas
- Producers: Cook Classics; Martin Garrix; Bart Schoudel

Martin Garrix singles chronology
"Byte" (2017)	"There for You" (2017)	"Pizza" (2017)

Troye Sivan singles chronology
"Heaven" (2016)	"There for You" (2017)	"My My My!" (2018)

Music video
- "There for You" on YouTube

"There for You" is a song by Dutch DJ Martin Garrix and Australian singer-songwriter Troye Sivan. It was released on 26 May 2017. The remixes album was released on 18 August 2017, featuring remixes from Araatan, Bali Bandits, Bart B More, Julian Jordan, Madison Mars, Vintage Culture, King Arthur, Goldhouse, Brohug, Lione and Lontalius.

== Background ==
Garrix debuted the song with Troye Sivan, who joined him on stage to perform at the Coachella Valley Music And Arts Festival of Empire Polo Club in Indio, California, on 14 April 2017. Sivan announced the title on Twitter and indicated that the song would have an official release, by saying "I love you guys and can't wait for you to have this song in ur phones". Garrix announced that "There for You" would be officially available on 26 May via an Instagram post. He revealed the artwork for the song in a post on Twitter.

== Track listing ==
Digital download
No.	Title	Length
1.	"There for You"	3:41

Digital download – The Remixes
No.	Title	Length
1.	"There for You" (Araatan Remix)	2:49
2.	"There for You" (Bali Bandits Remix)	3:12
3.	"There for You" (Dzeko Remix)	2:39
4.	"There for You" (Bart B More Remix)	2:54
5.	"There for You" (Julian Jordan Remix)	3:03
6.	"There for You" (Madison Mars Remix)	2:55
7.	"There for You" (Vintage Culture & Kohen Remix)	3:25
8.	"There for You" (King Arthur Remix)	3:56
9.	"There for You" (Goldhouse Remix)	3:03
10.	"There for You" (Brohug Remix)	3:23
11.	"There for You" (Lione Remix)	4:35
12.	"There for You" (Lontalius Remix)	3:46

== Credits and personnel ==
Credits adapted from Tidal.

- Martin Garrix – composing, producing, engineering
- Troye Sivan – composing
- Brett McLaughlin – composing, engineering
- Ben Burgess – composing
- William Lobban Bean – composing
- Jessie Thomas – composing
- Cook Classics – producing
- Bart Schoudel – producing, engineering
- Chelsea Avery – engineering

== Charts ==
=== Weekly charts ===
Weekly chart performance for "There for You"
Chart (2017)	Peak position
Australia (ARIA)	23
Austria (Ö3 Austria Top 40)	25
Belgium (Ultratop 50 Flanders)	19
Belgium (Ultratop 50 Wallonia)	15
Canada Hot 100 (Billboard)	48
Czech Republic Airplay (ČNS IFPI)	21
Czech Republic Singles Digital (ČNS IFPI)	6
Denmark (Tracklisten)	26
Finland (Suomen virallinen lista)	19
France (SNEP)	60
Germany (GfK)	31
Hungary (Single Top 40)	25
Hungary (Stream Top 40)	10
Ireland (IRMA)	28
Italy (FIMI)	30
Latvia (Latvijas Top 40)	7
Malaysia (RIM)	5
Netherlands (Dutch Top 40)	11
Netherlands (Single Top 100)	12
New Zealand (Recorded Music NZ)	22
Norway (VG-lista)	31
Philippines (Philippine Hot 100)	53
Portugal (AFP)	20
Scottish Singles Sales (Official Charts)	30
Slovakia Airplay (ČNS IFPI)	53
Slovakia Singles Digital (ČNS IFPI)	10
Spain (PROMUSICAE)	62
Sweden (Sverigetopplistan)	34
Switzerland (Schweizer Hitparade)	24
UK Singles (Official Charts)	40
US Billboard Hot 100	94
US Hot Dance/Electronic Songs (Billboard)	12

=== Year-end charts ===
Year-end chart performance for "There for You"
Chart (2017)	Position
Australia (ARIA)	92
Belgium (Ultratop Flanders)	58
Belgium (Ultratop Wallonia)	72
Hungary (Stream Top 40)	52
Latvia Airplay (LaIPA)	17
Netherlands (Dutch Top 40)	53
Netherlands (Single Top 100)	59
Portugal (AFP)	70
US Hot Dance/Electronic Songs (Billboard)	31

== Certifications ==
Certifications for "There for You"
Region	Certification	Certified units/sales
Australia (ARIA)	2× Platinum	140,000^{‡}
Belgium (BRMA)	Platinum	20,000^{‡}
Brazil (Pro-Música Brasil)	2× Platinum	120,000^{‡}
Canada (Music Canada)	Platinum	80,000^{‡}
Denmark (IFPI Danmark)	Gold	45,000^{‡}
France (SNEP)	Gold	66,666^{‡}
Germany (BVMI)	Gold	200,000^{‡}
Italy (FIMI)	Platinum	50,000^{‡}
Mexico (AMPROFON)	3× Platinum	180,000^{‡}
New Zealand (RMNZ)	Platinum	30,000^{‡}
Poland (ZPAV)	Gold	25,000^{‡}
Portugal (AFP)	Gold	5,000^{‡}
Spain (Promusicae)	Gold	30,000^{‡}
Sweden (GLF)	Gold	20,000^{‡}
Switzerland (IFPI Switzerland)	Gold	10,000^{‡}
United Kingdom (BPI)	Gold	400,000^{‡}
United States (RIAA)	Platinum	1,000,000^{‡}
^{‡} Sales+streaming figures based on certification alone.
