= Bylaw (EP) =

EP by Martin Garrix
- Released: 19 October 2018
- Length: 17:14
- Label: Stmpd; Epic Amsterdam; Sony Netherlands
- Producer: Martin Garrix; Blinders; Dyro; Pierce Fulton; Brad Delson

Martin Garrix chronology
Seven (2016)	Bylaw (2018)	2019 Remixed (2019)

Singles from Bylaw
- 1. "Breach (Walk Alone)" Released: 15 October 2018; 2. "Yottabyte" Released: 16 October 2018; 3. "Latency" Released: 17 October 2018; 4. "Access" Released: 18 October 2018; 5. "Waiting for Tomorrow" Released: 19 October 2018

Bylaw (alternatively Bylaw EP; stylised in all caps) is the fourth EP by Dutch DJ and record producer Martin Garrix. The EP was released in five parts, with a song being released each day from 15 to 19 October before being released in full on 19 October 2018, similar to the release schedule of Garrix's previous EP Seven. The EP features collaborations with Blinders, Dyro, Pierce Fulton, and Linkin Park singer Mike Shinoda. Details of the releases were initially leaked and thought to be rumours based on Garrix's website being updated, until Garrix confirmed the details through his Twitter. The first track, "Breach (Walk Alone)" with Blinders, was released on 15 October 2018. "Yottabyte", "Latency", "Access" and "Waiting for Tomorrow" followed on 16, 17, 18 and 19 October 2018, respectively.

== Promotion ==
On 13 October, Garrix posted a video of a plus symbol with static inside of it to his Facebook page; he denied that he was set to release a full-length album, later sharing videos of five static blocks to his Instagram as well as images of five fingers. His website then displayed a countdown, which ended at midnight on 15 October 2018, at which time, Garrix released the first track from the EP, "Breach (Walk Alone)", through music platforms.

== Track listing ==
Bylaw track listing
No.	Title	Writer(s)	Producer(s)	Length
1.	"Breach (Walk Alone)" (with Blinders)	Martijn Garritsen; Mateusz Owsiak; Ilsey Juber; Dewaine Whitmore	Martin Garrix; Blinders	2:58
2.	"Yottabyte"	Garritsen; Frank van Essen	Garrix	3:30
3.	"Latency" (with Dyro)	Garritsen; Jordy van Egmond	Garrix; Dyro	3:24
4.	"Access"	Garritsen	Garrix	3:15
5.	"Waiting for Tomorrow" (with Pierce Fulton featuring Mike Shinoda)	Garritsen; Pierce Fulton; Mike Shinoda; Brad Delson	Garrix; Fulton; Delson	4:07
Total length:				17:14

== Charts ==
Chart performance for Bylaw
Chart (2018)	Peak position
Dutch Combialbum (MegaCharts) (Note: The Dutch Combialbum chart combines all categories of albums, including the main albums chart, compilations and midprice albums, into one chart.)	85
Dutch Midprice Albums (MegaCharts)	13
US Top Dance Albums (Billboard)	19
