= Waiting for Tomorrow (Martin Garrix and Pierce Fulton song) =

Single by Martin Garrix and Pierce Fulton featuring Mike Shinoda

from the EP Bylaw
- Released: 19 October 2018
- Recorded: 2016; 2016 (original version); 2018 (re-recorded version)
- Length: 4:07
- Label: Stmpd; Epic Amsterdam; Sony Netherlands
- Songwriters: Martin Garrix; Pierce Fulton; Mike Shinoda; Brad Delson
- Producers: Martin Garrix; Pierce Fulton; Brad Delson

Martin Garrix singles chronology
| "Access" (2018) | "Waiting for Tomorrow" (2018) | "Dreamer" (2018) |

Pierce Fulton singles chronology
| "Listen to Your Mama" (2017) | "Waiting for Tomorrow" (2018) | "Overthinking Rain" (2019) |

Mike Shinoda singles chronology
| "Make It Up as I Go" (2018) | "Waiting for Tomorrow" (2018) | "Fine" (2019) |

Music video
- "Waiting for Tomorrow" on YouTube

"Waiting for Tomorrow" is a song by Dutch DJ and record producer Martin Garrix and American DJ and musician Pierce Fulton. It features lead vocals from singer Mike Shinoda, and uncredited production by fellow Linkin Park guitarist Brad Delson. It is released as the fifth and last track from Garrix's third EP, Bylaw, on October 19, 2018, via Stmpd, Epic Amsterdam and Sony Netherlands.

== Background ==
First premiered at the 2016 Ultra Music Festival by Garrix during his headlining closing set, it was initially expected to be included in his unreleased debut studio album +x. Linkin Park has been reported as a feature for the album alongside deceased vocalist Chester Bennington, although Shinoda is the most frequent mention. In April 2018, during the Q&A session of the documentary film What We Started, Garrix spoke about the link with Linkin Park, he stated "'Waiting for Tomorrow' was together with Linkin Park, and because of Chester's passing, it's little bit hard to release the song. I don't know if we're ever gonna release it. I hope so, maybe one day. But not soon I think. We are working on it, but I don't know yet. There's a lot of new unreleased music which I'm gonna release very soon."

== Track listing ==
Digital download

| No. | Title | Writer(s) | Producer(s) | Length |
|---|---|---|---|---|
| 1. | "Waiting for Tomorrow" (featuring Mike Shinoda) | Martijn Garritsen; Pierce Fulton; Mike Shinoda; Brad Delson | Martin Garrix; Pierce Fulton; Brad Delson | 4:07 |

== Charts ==
Chart performance for "Waiting for Tomorrow"
| Chart (2018) | Peak position |
|---|---|
| US Hot Dance/Electronic Songs (Billboard) | 26 |

== Certifications ==
Certifications for "Waiting for Tomorrow"
| Region | Certification | Certified units/sales |
|---|---|---|
| Brazil (Pro-Música Brasil) | Platinum | 40,000^{‡} |
^{‡} Sales+streaming figures based on certification alone.
