= What We Started =

- Film poster
- Directed by: Bert Marcus; Cyrus Saidi
- Produced by: Bert Marcus; Cassandra Hamar; Cyrus Saidi; Pete Tong (executive)
- Starring: Carl Cox; Martin Garrix
- Cinematography: Will Dearborn
- Edited by: Allan Duso; Greg Finton
- Music by: Nima Fakhrara; Stuart Roslyn; Pete Tong; Leticia Argudo; Jorge Flor; Gregory King; Kyle Weber; Irma de Wind; Navid Hejazi; Earworm Music
- Production company: Bert Marcus Productions
- Distributed by: Netflix
- Release dates: June 15, 2017 (LA Film Festival); June 10, 2018
- Country: United States
- Language: English

What We Started is an American documentary film about electronic dance music that premiered on June 15, 2017, at the Los Angeles Film Festival. The film is directed by Bert Marcus and Cyrus Saidi and produced by Bert Marcus, Cassandra Hamar, Cyrus Saidi and Bert Marcus Productions.

== Background ==
The film chronicles three decades of electronic dance music by focusing on the careers of Carl Cox and Martin Garrix. It also includes other individuals such as Erick Morillo, Moby, David Guetta, Steve Angello, Afrojack, Tiesto, Usher and Ed Sheeran. The film consists of interviews with artists involved with EDM's pervasiveness in pop culture.

The documentary begins with Carl Cox who walked around the empty cavern of Space in Ibiza, the nightclub where he had served as resident DJ since 2001.

== Cast ==
- Carl Cox
- Chip Eberhart
- David Guetta
- Ed Sheeran
- Erick Morillo
- Louis Vega
- Martin Garrix
- Paul Oakenfold
- Pete Tong
- Steve Angello
- Tiësto
- Usher Raymond

== Reception ==
On review aggregator website Rotten Tomatoes, the film holds an approval rating of 85% based on 20 reviews, as of April 2020. On Metacritic, the film has a weighted average score of 51 out of 100 (as of December 2019), indicating "mixed or average reviews", based five reviews.

A review in The New York Times described the film's protagonists as "gush[ing] about the genre’s milestones and metaphorically high-fiv[ing] one another while trying not to bore the uninitiated into a drugless stupor". While commending the film for "[trying] to present an accessible history of electronic music", it criticized it for its "subcultural cliquishness" and described it as promotional of the Ultra Music Festival. A review on EDMtunes.com called it "the premier film on Electronic Music history" and "a film that speaks to all dance music enthusiasts." The website Dancing Astronaut described it as a "dance music film that gets it right." The Nocturnal Times stated that "What We Started is the best electronic music film of our time, offering a precisely accurate adaptation of the rapidly growing electronic scene and its worldwide domination," and that the film "gets it all right." One reviewer notes that "as one watches WHAT WE STARTED, one of the striking elements which rings forth is the idea of "resiliency", and that "thanks to detailed research and a self-imposed mantra to remain unbiased in the presentation of the documentary, the filmmakers peel back the glossy layers of bright lights and enthusiastic concerts and delve into the darker aspects of culture that all but wiped out EDM prior to its rebirth and resurgence."

Variety criticized What We Started for a lack of focus and a short attention span ("what works in a nightclub set doesn't always work in a film"), and called it "an entertaining survey of how far the music has come" which however "rarely manages to dig below the surface to the art vs. commerce dilemmas that seem to lie at the heart of some of the genre’s biggest flashpoints." Nerd Reactor gave the film 4/5 stars, stating that it "may have its flaws but it’s a fun dynamic ride through the history of EDM". Your EDM called it "brilliant."

A review from Quelle Movies rated the film 8 out of 10, “tell[s] a thorough and solid chronicle of EDM’s journey that entices both the fan and the non-initiated” Film Frenzy rated them 3 out of 4 and stated it as “an illuminating and entertaining documentary.”.

When the film was released on Netflix on July 1, 2018, it received several other positive blog reviews. Film Inquiry opined that "films like What We Started, are a really big deal...It melds our generations through what we have in common, instead of what is different." Uncle Barky stated that it is "a trip well worth taking, whether you’re a devotee of EDM or a neophyte..." Radio Times called it "a decent, comprehensive account of dance music’s evolution."
