= Martin Garrix =

Dutch DJ and record producer (born 1996)

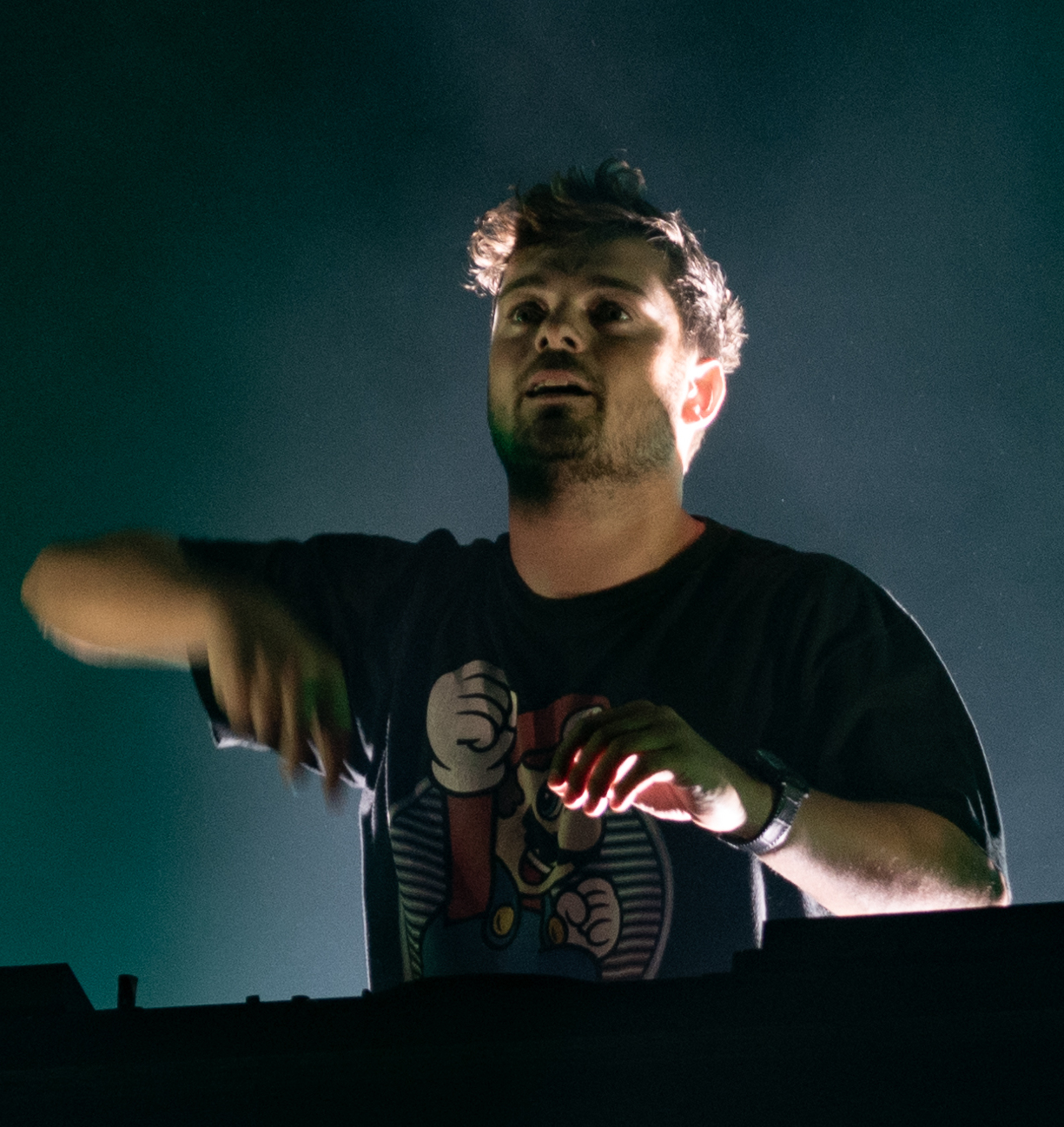
- Garrix in 2023

Background information
- Also known as: GRX; Ytram
- Born: Martijn Gerard Garritsen; 14 May 1996 (age 30); Amstelveen, Netherlands
- Genres: Progressive house; big room house; Dutch house; deep house; electro house; future bass
- Occupations: DJ; singer; record producer
- Years active: 2012–present
- Labels: Stmpd; Musical Freedom; Wall; Republic; School Boy; Casablanca; Universal; Epic Amsterdam; RCA (United States) (2016–present); Columbia (United Kingdom) (2016–present); Sony (2016–present)
- Member of: Area21
- Website: martingarrix.com

Martijn Gerard Garritsen (Dutch pronunciation: [mɑrˈtɛin ˈɣerɑrt‿ˈxɑrɪtsə(n)]; (Note: In isolation, Garritsen is pronounced [ˈɣɑrɪtsə(n)].) born 14 May 1996), known professionally as Martin Garrix and also as Ytram or GRX, is a Dutch DJ, singer, and record producer. Best known for his singles "Animals", "In the Name of Love", and "Scared to Be Lonely", he was ranked number one on DJ Mag's Top 100 DJs list in 2016, 2017, 2018, 2022, and 2024.

Garrix has performed at music festivals such as Coachella, Electric Daisy Carnival, Ultra Music Festival, Tomorrowland, and Creamfields. In 2014, he headlined the first edition of Ultra South Africa, making this his first major festival. In the same year, he became the youngest DJ to headline 2014 Ultra Music Festival at the age of 17. He was a resident DJ at Spain's Hï Ibiza (2017) and Ushuaïa Ibiza (2016 and 2018). He founded the label Stmpd Rcrds in 2016, months after leaving Spinnin' Records and before signing with Sony Music.

== Early life ==
Martijn Gerard Garritsen was born on 14 May 1996, in Amstelveen, the son of Gerard and Karin Garritsen. He has a younger sister named Laura. He showed musical interest at an early age and learned to play the guitar at the age of 8.

In 2004, he expressed interest in becoming a DJ after seeing Dutch DJ Tiësto perform at that year's Summer Olympics Opening Ceremony in Athens. He took particular inspiration from the track "Traffic", prompting him to download the specialist digital audio workstation FL Studio, enabling him to start producing.

In 2013, he graduated from the Herman Brood Academy, a production school in Utrecht.

== Career ==
=== 2012–2014: Spinnin' Records deal, "Animals", and Gold Skies ===
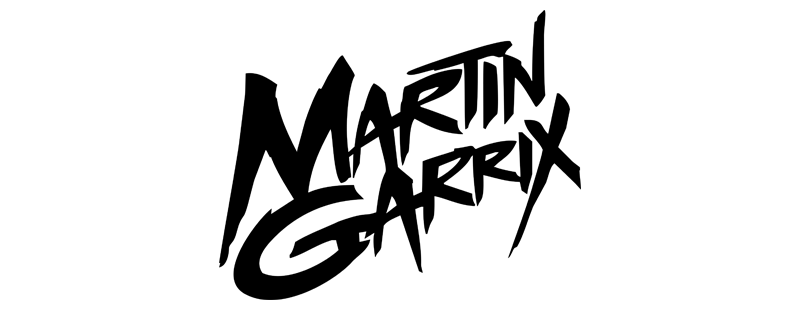
Martin Garrix's logo, 2012–2015

Garrix was discovered by Tiësto, whom he described as inspirational, humble, and legendary. He had his beginnings with the songs "BFAM", a collaboration with Dutch DJ Julian Jordan, and "Just Some Loops", a collaboration with TV Noise. In the documentary What We Started, Garrix describes how he was discovered by the Dutch record label Spinnin' Records following the release of his remix for the Enrique Iglesias single "Tonight (I'm Loving You)". He signed with Spinnin' Records in 2012, releasing "Error 404", a collaboration with Dutch DJ Jay Hardway. In 2013, Garrix co-released "Torrent" with Dutch DJ Sidney Samson on Tiësto's Musical Freedom label.

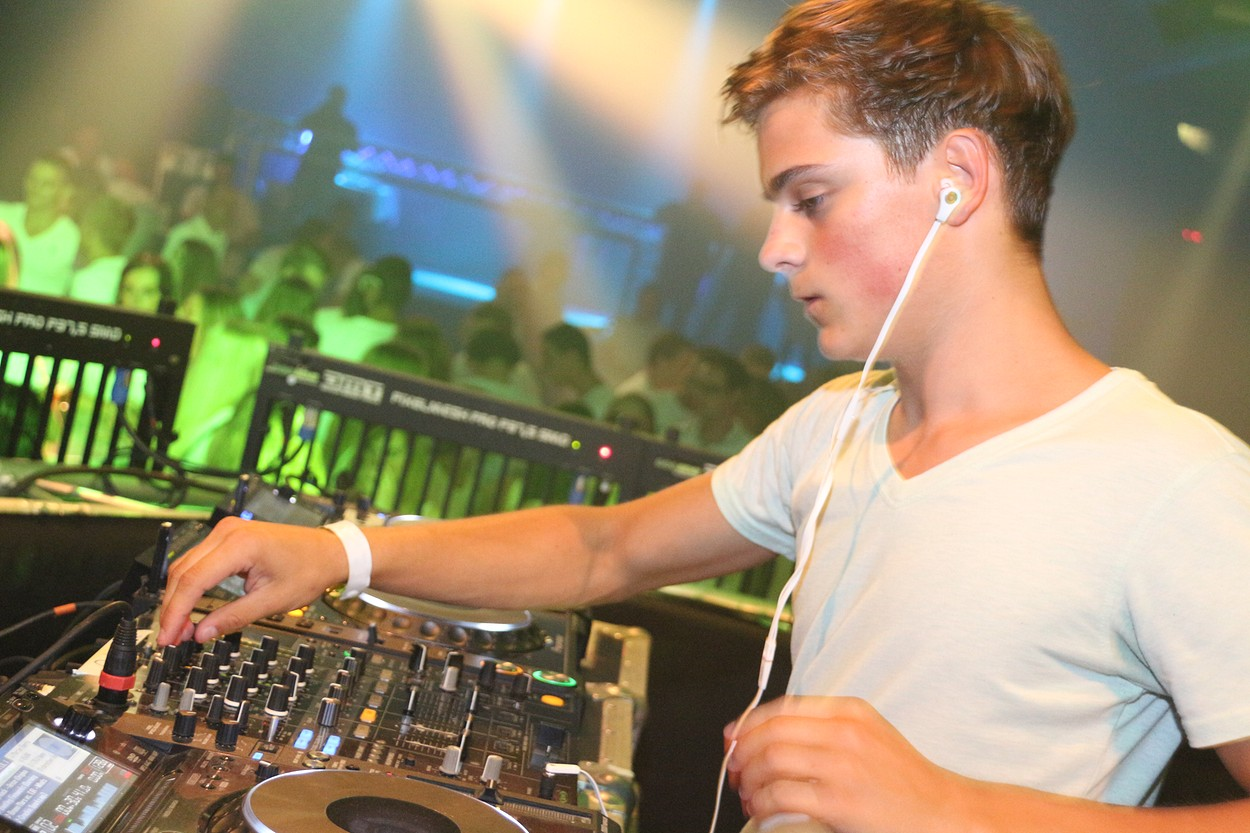
Garrix at Midsummer White Festival 2013

Garrix gained fame through his solo release, "Animals", which was released on 16 June 2013. The single became a hit in several countries in Europe, and allowed Garrix to become the youngest person to reach number one on Beatport. The track appears on Dutch DJ Hardwell's album, Hardwell presents 'Revealed Volume 4'. On 30 September, Garrix released a remix of "Project T" by Sander Van Doorn and Belgian-Greek DJ duo Dimitri Vegas & Like Mike which quickly hit number one on the Beatport charts. He appeared on DJ Magazine's top 100 DJs list in 2013 as a new entry at number 40.

In November 2013, Garrix signed a deal with American entertainment company Scooter Braun Projects, making Garrix the company's first EDM client. The deal was split-worldwide management with MusicAllStars Management, sister company of Spinnin' Records, since Garrix was already signed to Spinnin' Records.

In December 2013, he released "Wizard" with Jay Hardway which peaked at number 6 in Belgium and number 17 in the Netherlands. In 2014, Garrix collaborated with Dutch duo Firebeatz on "Helicopter" which reached number one on the Beatport Top 100 charts for two weeks. He also produced the Sensation 2014 anthem, "Tremor", along with Dimitri Vegas & Like Mike.

Garrix performed at Ultra Music Festival 2014, where he debuted several new and unreleased tracks, including collaborations with American DJ Dillon Francis, Hardwell, and Dutch DJ Afrojack. In June, he collaborated with Dutch DJ Sander van Doorn and Canadian duo DVBBS on "Gold Skies". This was his first vocal track which featured the singer Aleesia. He also released the track "Proxy" for free download. Most of these songs were featured on Garrix's debut EP, Gold Skies, which was released on 8 July 2014.

After the release of his debut EP, Garrix continued to collaborate with mainstream DJs. The first of such collaborations being a song with Dutch DJ MOTi called "Virus (How About Now)", followed by a collaboration with Afrojack called "Turn Up the Speakers" which Afrojack and Garrix both premiered at Ultra Music Festival. In 2014, he appeared on DJ Magazine's top 100 DJs list at number 4.

=== 2015: Collaborations and Spinnin' contract termination ===
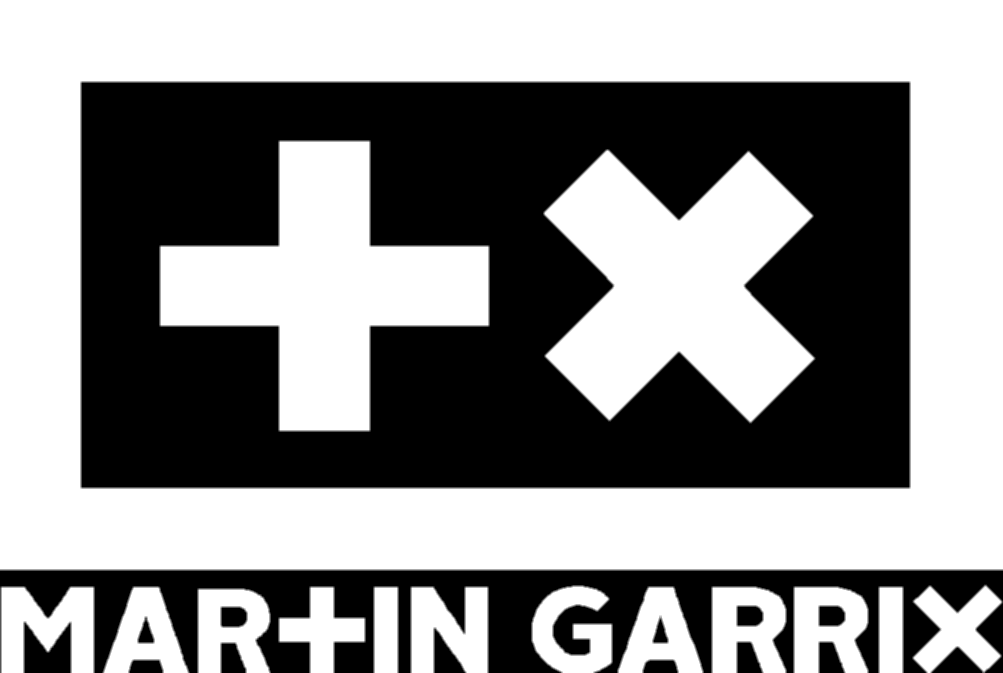
Garrix's "+×" logo since 2015

In 2015, Garrix experimented with progressive house and started producing progressive tracks aside from his signature big room sound. On 6 February, he released the track "Forbidden Voices" as a gift to his fans after his Facebook page reached 10 million likes.

In February 2015, he released the single "Don't Look Down" featuring Grammy-winner Usher. He also released two video versions for it on Vevo, "Towel Boy" and "Towel Girl". The track was written by Garrix, James 'JHart' Abrahart, and Busbee. It peaked at number three on the Billboard Dance Club Songs. In an interview with British media company Digital Spy in early 2015, Garrix noted that Usher is a "humble" artist and a great collaborator to whom he can directly give input.

Garrix also worked with multi-Grammy winner Ed Sheeran on a track called "Rewind, Repeat It" which he played at Ultra Music Festival in Miami in March 2015. On 4 May, he released a track with Tiësto, called "The Only Way Is Up". On 22 May, Swedish DJ Avicii released a lyric video of the song "Waiting for Love" which was co-produced by Garrix. On 6 July, Garrix released the Break Through the Silence dual single with Russian DJs Matisse and Sadko, consisting of the songs "Break Through the Silence" and "Dragon". On 31 October, he released a track titled "Poison" as a promotional single. On 31 December, Garrix released "Bouncybob", his final track of the year, for free which he had co-produced with Justin Mylo and Mesto.

On 26 August 2015, Garrix announced that he had left Spinnin' Records and MusicAllStars Management due to a conflict over the ownership of his music. A point of contention was the release of "Animals" which appeared when Garrix was 17 years old. He also announced that he had filed a lawsuit against his then-manager Eelko van Kooten. In November 2015, Garrix announced that he would be creating his own record label. He also went on to sue his manager, Eelko van Kooten, stating that he was told "false and misleading information" before signing with Spinnin' Records.

On 2 December 2015, Garrix reportedly settled with Spinnin' Records in their ongoing legal dispute over the ownership rights of his music. He released a statement confirming that he had withdrawn the summary proceedings after his former record label transferred the ownership rights of his music to him, granted that exclusive licence of all his tracks released before August 2015 will be retained by Spinnin' Records for an undisclosed period. However, Garrix also stated that their other outstanding disagreements will likely be the subject of further legal proceedings.

=== 2016: Launch of Stmpd Rcrds, Sony record deal, documentary and awards ===
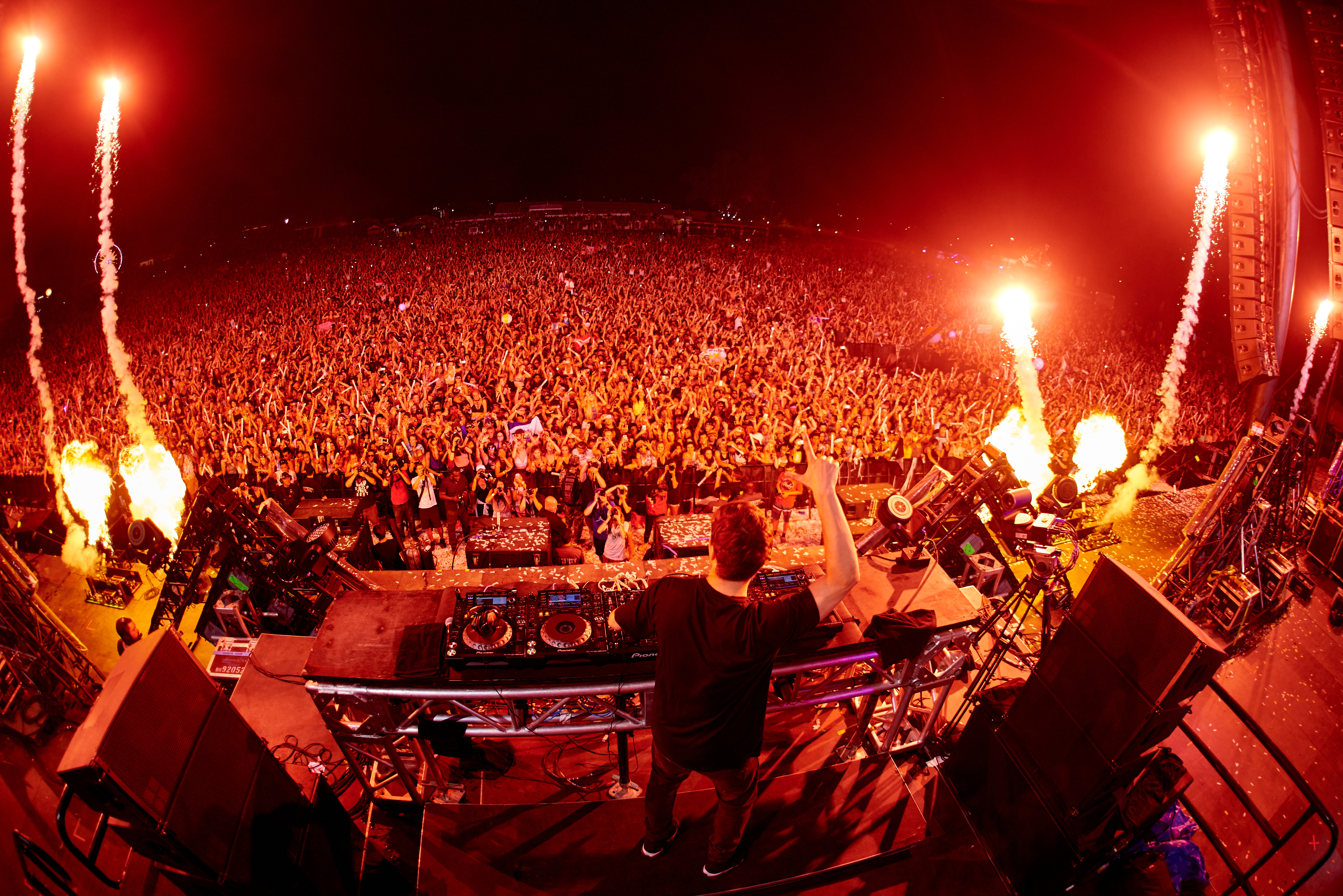
Garrix live at VELD Music Festival, 2016

Garrix launched his own record label called Stmpd Rcrds in the first quarter of 2016. Speaking about the label, he said that he wanted it to be a 'platform' for artists of various genres. On 11 March 2016, he released his first single via Stmpd Rcrds titled "Now That I've Found You (Martin Garrix song)", featuring the vocals of John Martin and Michel Zitron.

On 18 March 2016, he made use of his one-hour set to premiere ten new unreleased tracks at Ultra Music Festival, including collaborations with Jay Hardway, Julian Jordan, Ed Sheeran, Bebe Rexha, Third Party, and Linkin Park along with Area21, Garrix's duo with Maejor. On 27 May 2016, he released his second single "Lions in the Wild" with British DJ duo Third Party. On 13 June 2016, Garrix released a promotional single titled "Oops" which became the Electronic Entertainment Expo 2016 anthem.

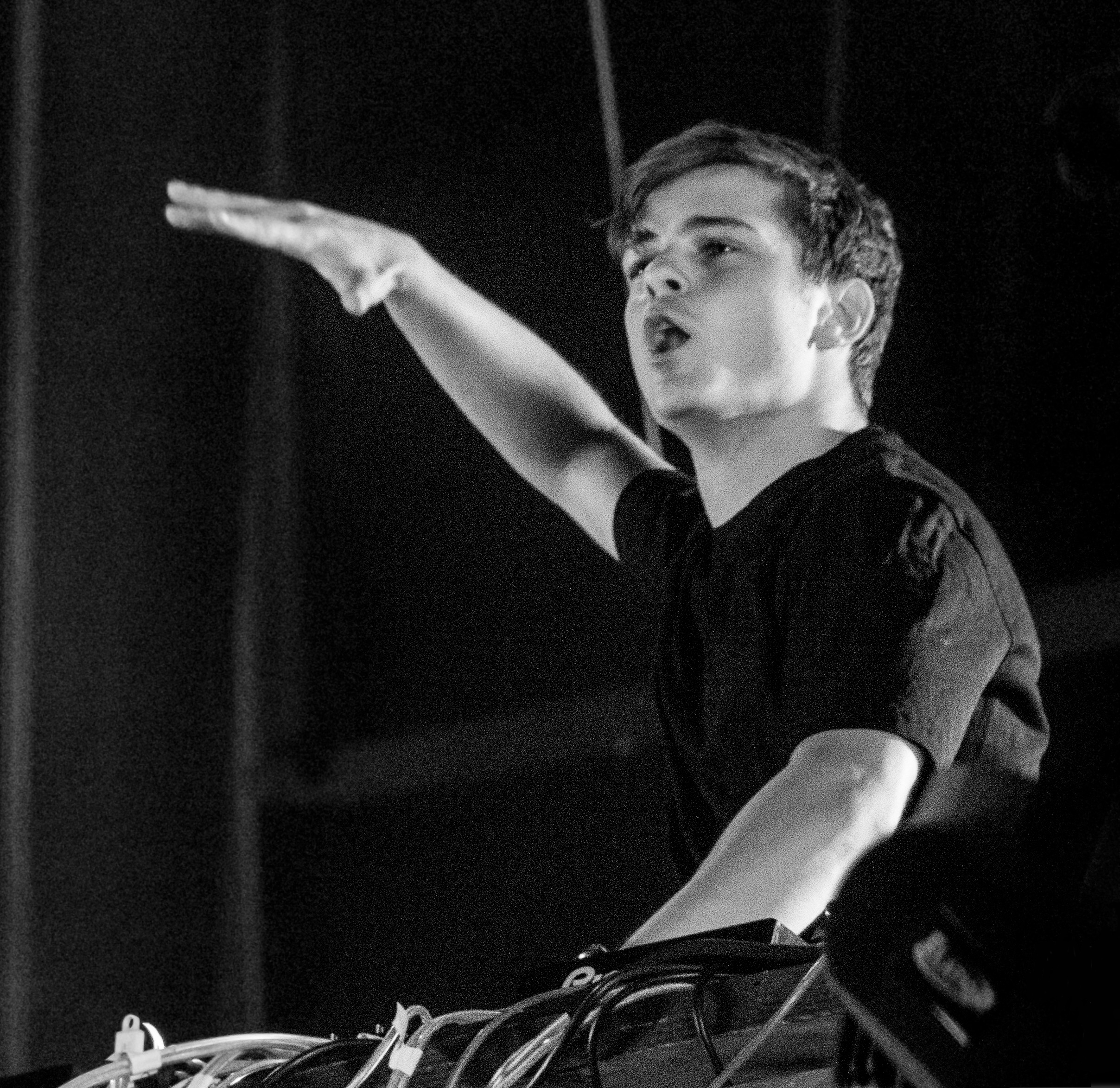
Garrix at VELD 2016

On 26 July 2016, it was announced that Garrix signed a worldwide contract with Sony Music International. He explained that, "their forward thinking approach to streaming and incredible roster of talented artists combined with their passion and understanding for my vision of the future of my music made this a no brainer."

On 29 July 2016, he released the track "In the Name of Love" with American singer Bebe Rexha. On 22 August 2016, Garrix made his first-ever live performance of his own music, with Rexha on The Tonight Show Starring Jimmy Fallon, accompanied by The Tonight Show house band, The Roots.

On 14 October 2016, Garrix announced on social media that he was releasing seven songs for seven days. Several of the released songs have been premiered during his performances at Ultra Music Festival and Tomorrowland Belgium. The songs were uploaded onto his YouTube channel as music videos with seven visual artists who live-painted their interpretations of each song.

On 19 October 2016, Garrix was named the world's top DJ in DJ Mag's annual Top 100 DJs poll. Speaking to the press, he said "It feels unreal to have won. I 100 percent did not expect it at all. I've had an amazing year, with awesome shows and amazing fans – I'm so thankful for their support. I didn't even do a campaign, and it just shows how dope the fanbase is."

It was announced that Garrix would co-star, alongside British DJ Carl Cox in an EDM-themed documentary titled "What We Started". The documentary was directed by Bert Marcus alongside executive producer and music supervisor Pete Tong. The documentary was premiered on 15 June 2017 at the LA Film Festival.

On 6 November 2016, Garrix won "Best Electronic Act" and "Best World Stage Performance" awards at the MTV European Music Awards 2016.

On 31 December 2016, Martin Garrix played "Scared to Be Lonely", featuring British singer Dua Lipa, for the first time while headlining the stage at his first ever show in Myanmar. He released the song on 27 January 2017.

=== 2017: Residency, modelling, legal victory and collaborations ===
Garrix announced that he would be supporting Canadian singer Justin Bieber on his Purpose World Tour in Australia which began in March and at the 'Barclaycard presents British Summer Time Hyde Park' show on 2 July 2017.

On 27 January 2017, he released "Scared to Be Lonely", a collaboration with British singer Dua Lipa. He performed the song with Lipa on The Tonight Show Starring Jimmy Fallon in March before releasing two volumes of extended plays featuring twelve remixes.

Garrix was announced as a resident DJ for the 2017 season at Hï Ibiza, previously known as Space Ibiza, a popular dance-music club owned by Ushuaïa Entertainment. He previously had a DJ residency at Hï Ibiza's sister venue, Ushuaïa in 2016.

On 7 April 2017, "Byte", a collaboration with Brooks, was released as a single. The song was previously debuted by Garrix during his 2017 Ultra Music Festival set in Miami.

On 14 April 2017, Garrix debuted a collaboration with Australian singer Troye Sivan, who later joined him on stage for their performance at the Coachella Valley Music And Arts Festival in California. The song title was "There for You", as announced by Sivan on Twitter. The song was officially released on 26 May 2017.

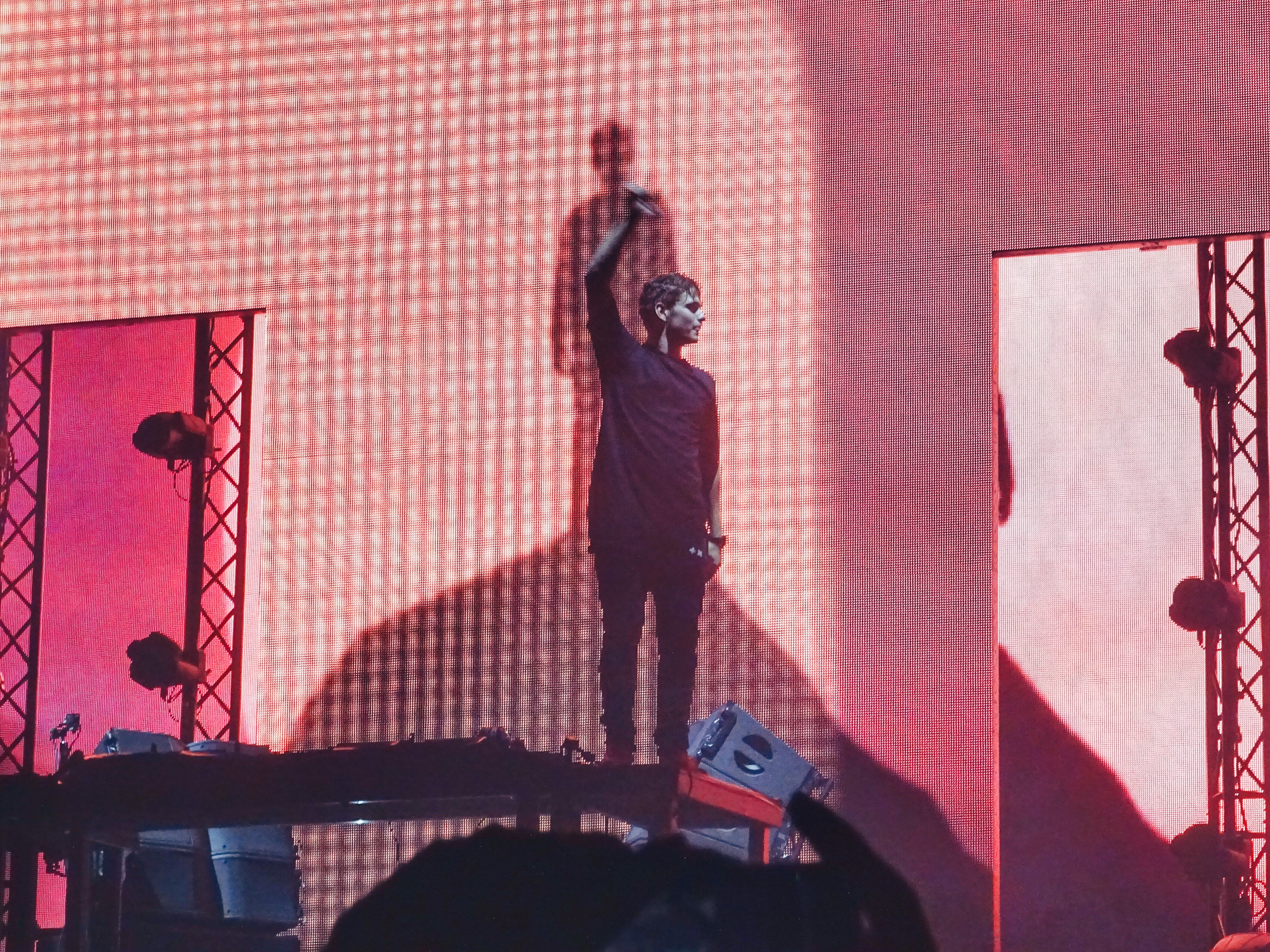
Garrix at World Club Dome Winter Edition 2017

Garrix appeared as the face of Armani Exchange in their Fall 2017 campaign, becoming one of the first few internationally recognised DJs to enter modelling. Armani Exchange announced it on social media, stating "the face of the new Armani Exchange Fall Winter 2017/2018 campaign: Martin Garrix"

At the Tomorrowland 2017 festival, Garrix debuted his YTRAM alias, which spells "Marty" backwards. He also premiered the song "So Far Away", a collaboration with French DJ David Guetta, who joined him on stage to perform it, as well as his first solo track in over a year, "Pizza", which received an official release on 25 August 2017.

Garrix was listed in Forbes' World's Highest-Paid DJs 2017 ranking with earnings of $19.5 million for the 12 months prior to June 2017.

Details of Garrix's collaborative unreleased song with Ed Sheeran, titled "Replay Rewind" or alternately, "Rewind, Repeat It", was published on ASCAP with Sony and BDI listed as the publishers of the song. The track was not officially released. The song was premiered at the 2015 Ultra Music Festival in Miami and is regularly played by Garrix at music festivals.

On 20 September 2017, a Dutch judge ruled in favour of Garrix who regained the rights to his music that were previously signed to Spinnin' Records and MusicAllStars, to have his contract permanently terminated. Garrix, who demanded €3.7 million from Spinnin' and €650,000 from MusicAllStars, said "All of (their) claims have been rejected by the court. The only remaining question is the amount to be repaid (to Garrix)."

On 15 October 2017, Martin Garrix, under the alias GRX, collaborated again with Brooks to release the song "Boomerang". On 20 October, Garrix alongside Russian DJ's Matisse & Sadko release the song "Forever". In December 2017, he released "So Far Away" with David Guetta, featuring Romy Dya and Jamie Scott. British singer Ellie Goulding was originally supposed to be featured on the song but her label prevented the release after it was previewed by Garrix at his Tomorrowland set.

=== 2018: Closing the Winter Olympics, further collaborations and Bylaw ===
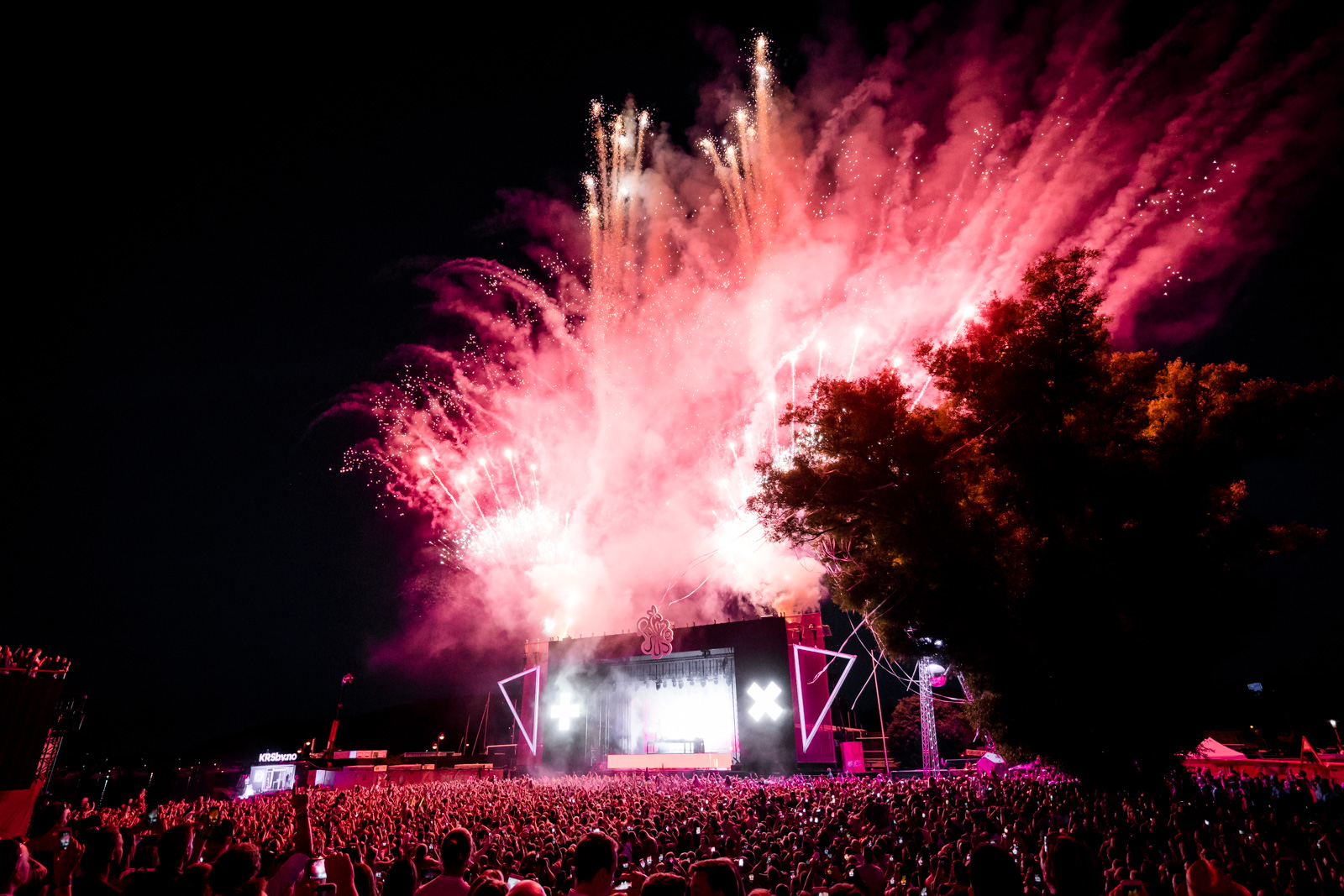
Garrix at Palmesus 2018, the stage lighting showing his signature "+×" logo.

On 23 February 2018, Garrix released his second collaboration with David Guetta and his third with Brooks with the song "Like I Do". Two days later, he headlined the closing ceremony of the Pyeongchang 2018 Winter Olympic Games at the Pyeongchang Olympic Stadium in South Korea. He was the closing act of the night, performing his newly released single as well as many others. His setlist is as follows: "Forever", "Together", "Animals", "Like I Do", and "Pizza".

On 20 April 2018, Garrix released his collaboration with Loopers titled "Game Over". On 15 June, he released the single "Ocean", a collaboration with American R&B singer Khalid. On 29 July, he headlined the Tomorrowland Belgium 2018 music festival and released the single "High on Life", a collaboration with singer Bonn, immediately after his closing set ended. On 30 July, the music video for "High on Life" was released which contained footage from his Tomorrowland set.

Garrix was announced as a resident DJ at Ushuaia Ibiza Beach Hotel, performing on Thursdays from 5 July to 30 August 2018. It was announced that he will be bringing guests to perform with him at the said venue. He was also scheduled to be the resident DJ at Hakkasan Nightclub, Omnia Nightclub, and Wet Republic Dayclub starting 2 August.

On 10 August 2018, under his 'GRX' alias, he released the single "X's", a collaboration with Dutch DJ CMC$ featuring Icona Pop. On 14 September, he released his collaboration with Justin Mylo featuring Dewain Whitmore Jr. titled "Burn Out". The music video was released on the same day.

It was announced on social media that Garrix was releasing five songs in five days, in a similar manner to the single releases of his Seven EP in 2016. The songs are all part of the Bylaw EP, and are: "Breach (Walk Alone)" with Blinders, "Yottabyte", "Latency" with Dyro, "Access", and "Waiting for Tomorrow" with Pierce Fulton featuring Mike Shinoda. In the same month, Garrix performed at the F1 Singapore Grand Prix.

In October 2018, Garrix was ranked number one on DJ Mag's annual Top 100 DJs list, winning for the third time in a row. His first win in 2016 made him the youngest DJ to top the poll. The awarding ceremony was held onstage at the Amsterdam ArenA during the 2018 Amsterdam Dance Event (ADE) where Garrix headlined.

On 1 November 2018, he released the single "Dreamer" featuring American singer Mike Yung. He released his next single "Glitch", with long-time collaborator Julian Jordan on 14 December.

=== 2019: Headlining festivals and song leaks ===
Garrix announced an upcoming collaboration with Bonn, titled "No Sleep". The single was released in February 2019, along with the music video.

In February 2019, he performed at the Ultra Music Festival Australia, a two-day festival held in Sydney and Melbourne.

In March 2019, he headlined Tomorrowland Winter, held in France, and Ultra Music Festival, held in Miami.

On 18 July 2019, Garrix release the song These Are The Times featuring Jamaican vocalist JRM.

In October 2019, Garrix lost his place as number 1 DJ to Belgian DJs Dimitri Vegas & Like Mike, whom he beat to number one in 2016, after spending a consecutive three years at the top. Garrix finished the 2019 polls in second place. The next month, he announced on his Instagram account that he had ended his relationship of over three years with Dutch model Charelle Schriek.

On 24 December 2019, Spinnin' Records won the appeal from the court ruling of the Higher Court of Leeuwarden, suggesting that Garrix did not have the right to break his agreement prematurely with Spinnin' and MusicAllstars Management.

A few days after Spinnin' Records won the appeal, Martin's computer was hacked by an unknown assailant where the hacker stole and leaked a number of unreleased songs, including "Rewind, Repeat It".

I am delighted with the ruling of the Higher Court that we made valid agreements with Martijn at the time, which should have been respected. This statement confirms that the accusation of deception or fraud was unjustified. Even though I have since sold Spinnin' Records and MusicAllStars Management, those accusations were also aimed at me personally. I look back with pride on a successful collaboration with Martijn and wish him the best in his further career.

— Eelko van Kooten

=== 2020–2021: Touring pause and collaborations ===
In February 2020, Garrix released the single "Drown" featuring Australian singer Clinton Kane. For the 2020 King's Day celebrations in April, Garrix played a set from the rooftop of A'DAM Toren in Amsterdam in place of the usual in-person festivities due to the COVID-19 pandemic. The next month, he released the single "Higher Ground", featuring singer John Martin. On 5 February 2021, Garrix released the single "Pressure", featuring Swedish singer Tove Lo.

On the occasion of his 25th birthday, 14 May 2021, Garrix released "We Are the People" featuring Bono and the Edge from Irish rock band U2, which served as the official song of UEFA Euro 2020. The trio performed the song as part of the tournament's virtual opening ceremony at Rome's Stadio Olimpico, and Garrix also performed the song as part of a mix for the tournament's closing ceremony at London's Wembley Stadium. Three further collaborations followed: "Love Runs Out" featuring G-Eazy and Sasha Alex Sloan, "Diamonds" with Julian Jordan featuring Tinie Tempah, and "Won't Let You Go" with Matisse & Sadko and John Martin.

=== 2022–present: Sentio ===
On 27 March 2022, Garrix released "Follow", a collaboration with Zedd featuring guest vocals from Emily Warren. A week later, he released the track "Limitless" with Mesto. On the same day, Garrix announced his debut album, Sentio, which was released on 29 April. All the songs on the album were listed in order of release date as singles.

On 15 July 2022, Garrix released "Loop", a collaboration with DallasK featuring vocals from Sasha Alex Sloan. The track was first premiered during Garrix's set at Ultra Music Festival earlier that year.

Garrix reclaimed the DJ Mag Top 100 DJs title on 19 October, 2022, his fourth time winning the award.

On 8 December 2022, Garrix released "Hero", a collaboration with Jvke and the mobile card game Marvel Snap.

At the end of 2024, Garrix once again won the DJ Mag Top 100 DJs award, winning his fifth title, and tying David Guetta and Armin Van Buuren for the joint-most wins by a single DJ. The 1st of October of 2025, he was named the second-best DJ in the world by DJ Mag’s Top 100 DJs Awards, narrowly missing the top spot he held in 2024. The recognition marked a decade of uninterrupted podium finishes for Garrix, who has remained in the top three every year since 2015.

In June 2026, whilst performing shows in the United States, Garrix debuted his collaboration with American singer Madonna, "Bizarre". The track, which was released on the latter's fifteenth studio album, Confessions II, debuted at number 58 on the UK Singles Downloads Chart.

== Brand endorsement and modelling ==
In October 2015, Garrix was an ambassador for Swiss brand TAG Heuer.

In 2017, Garrix was an ambassador for Italian brand Armani Exchange's "Fall Winter 2017" campaign. The announcement was made in July 2017, along with the release of the promotional photographs on social media. The promotional video, featuring Garrix wearing the brand's clothing and eyewear line, was released in August 2017.

In 2018, Garrix was once again an ambassador for Armani Exchange. The promotional video for the brand's "Fall Winter 2018" campaign was released in August 2018, featuring Garrix wearing the brand's new clothing line. His collaboration track with Loopers, "Game Over", was used for the video. The behind-the-scenes footage during the filming was also released by Armani Exchange.

Garrix became an ambassador for Axe, and launched a limited-edition Martin Garrix body spray on 14 September 2018. To promote the partnership and the product launch, Axe and Garrix released his music video for "Burn Out" in collaboration with the brand and created by AXE's global creative agency 72andSunny Amsterdam.

Garrix was again an ambassador for Axe in 2019. The song "These Are the Times" was released on 18 July to help promote the partnership.

== Philanthropy ==
In May 2016, Garrix headlined an event in Los Angeles with all proceeds going to the non-profit organisation Fuck Cancer, dedicated to early detection, prevention and providing support to those affected by cancer.

In November 2016, Garrix started his India tour with a special charity show in Mumbai with over 62,000 in attendance. Hosted at the Mahalaxmi Racecourse, the charity event's purpose was to educate Indian children, with the proceeds from the show being donated to Magic Bus, which was slated to support the education of 10,000 children across the country.

On 24 February 2017, Garrix was announced as an "international friend" for SOS Children's Village in South Africa, a non-profit organisation that "builds families for orphaned, abandoned, and other vulnerable children around the world". Speaking to Billboard, he said "it is awful that so many children around the world don't have the support of a caring family". Following the Mexico earthquake in 2017, Garrix donated $10,000 of his fee as Ultra Mexico line up.

On 28 February 2019, Garrix visited the SOS Children's Village in South Africa while on tour for Ultra South Africa. During his visit Garrix performed a one-hour DJ set to an excited crowd of 100 children and young people, some aged just three years old and accompanied by their SOS mothers.

In September 2019, Garrix held a show in his home country the Netherlands with all proceeds going towards the War Child Holland Charity. During the show he raised more than €270,000. In June 2020, he appeared in a public service announcement alongside other celebrities for War Child, an organisation that supports and empowers the most vulnerable communities, focusing on children and their families.

== Book ==
On 23 August 2018, Garrix posted a picture of the cover of his then-upcoming book Martin Garrix Life = Crazy, containing photographs of his career and personal life. The photographs featured in the book were taken by Louis van Baar. The book was released in October 2018.

== Discography ==
=== Studio albums ===
- Sentio (2022)
- Marty (2027)

=== Extended plays ===
- Gold Skies (2014)
- Break Through the Silence (2015, with Matisse & Sadko)
- Seven (2016)
- Bylaw (2018)
- IDEM (2024)
- Origo (2025)

=== Compilations ===
- The Martin Garrix Collection (2017)
- The Martin Garrix Collection (Deluxe) (2018)
- The Martin Garrix Experience (2019)

== Filmography ==
Title	Year	Role	Notes	Ref.
NCIS: Ibiza	2015	Himself	Short comedy film by Funny or Die	
The Ride	2016	Himself	Documentary by MTV	
What We Started	2017	Himself	Documentary	
