= Pizza (song) =

Single by Martin Garrix
- Released: 25 August 2017
- Genre: Progressive house
- Length: 4:15
- Label: Stmpd
- Songwriter: Martijn Garritsen
- Producer: Martin Garrix

Martin Garrix singles chronology
"There for You" (2017)	"Pizza" (2017)	"Forever" (2017)

Music video
- "Pizza" on YouTube

"Pizza" is a song by Dutch DJ and record producer Martin Garrix. It premiered during Garrix's headlining performance at Tomorrowland 2017 and was released through Stmpd Rcrds on 25 August 2017.

== Background ==
Garrix debuted "Pizza" as his closing track at Tomorrowland 2017. On 30 July 2017, A fan tweeted to Garrix speculating the title of the song, to which Garrix replied: "It's actually called Pizza." It was used as the background music in a recap video for his performances in Ibiza, which was published on 10 August 2017. On 14 August 2017, when responding to a fan who asked for new music, he announced on Twitter that he will be releasing the song in the next two weeks. He claimed that the song was specially made for his Tomorrowland set. On 16 August 2017, Garrix shared a studio session of the song, filmed in his studio in Amsterdam, Netherlands. "Finishing this song today (I hope)," he captioned. On 20 August 2017, he revealed the song's release date when replying to a fan, who asked if the production was finished. He shared an official teaser of the song the next day.

== Critical reception ==
Pizza was met with widespread critical acclaim from music critics. Writing for Your EDM, Matthew Meadow described the song as "a true progressive house anthem" and "progressive house at its purest and most melodic". He thinks that the track's name is "rather corny", and felt that it "lifted listeners up with massive kicks, powerful drums, huge chords and beautiful melodies" and "showcased everything Garrix stands for as a producer". Karlie Powell of the same publication called the song a "cheery tune", and is "much like the cheesy, delicious food" of the track's title. Grace Wade of EDM Sauce opined that the song is "punctuated with pronounced kicks and a smooth melody". Erik, also from EDM Sauce, stated that the song "is truly some of Martin's best work yet". Rajrishi Murthi of the Bagin Beats called it a "gorgeous closing track" and wrote that it "oozes signature progressive house sounds that has helped the producer become a household name within the dance music space".

== Charts ==
Chart (2017)	Peak position
Sweden Heatseeker (Sverigetopplistan)	12
Switzerland (Schweizer Hitparade)	85
US Hot Dance/Electronic Songs (Billboard)	30
