= Afrojack discography =

Discography of Dutch DJ Afrojack

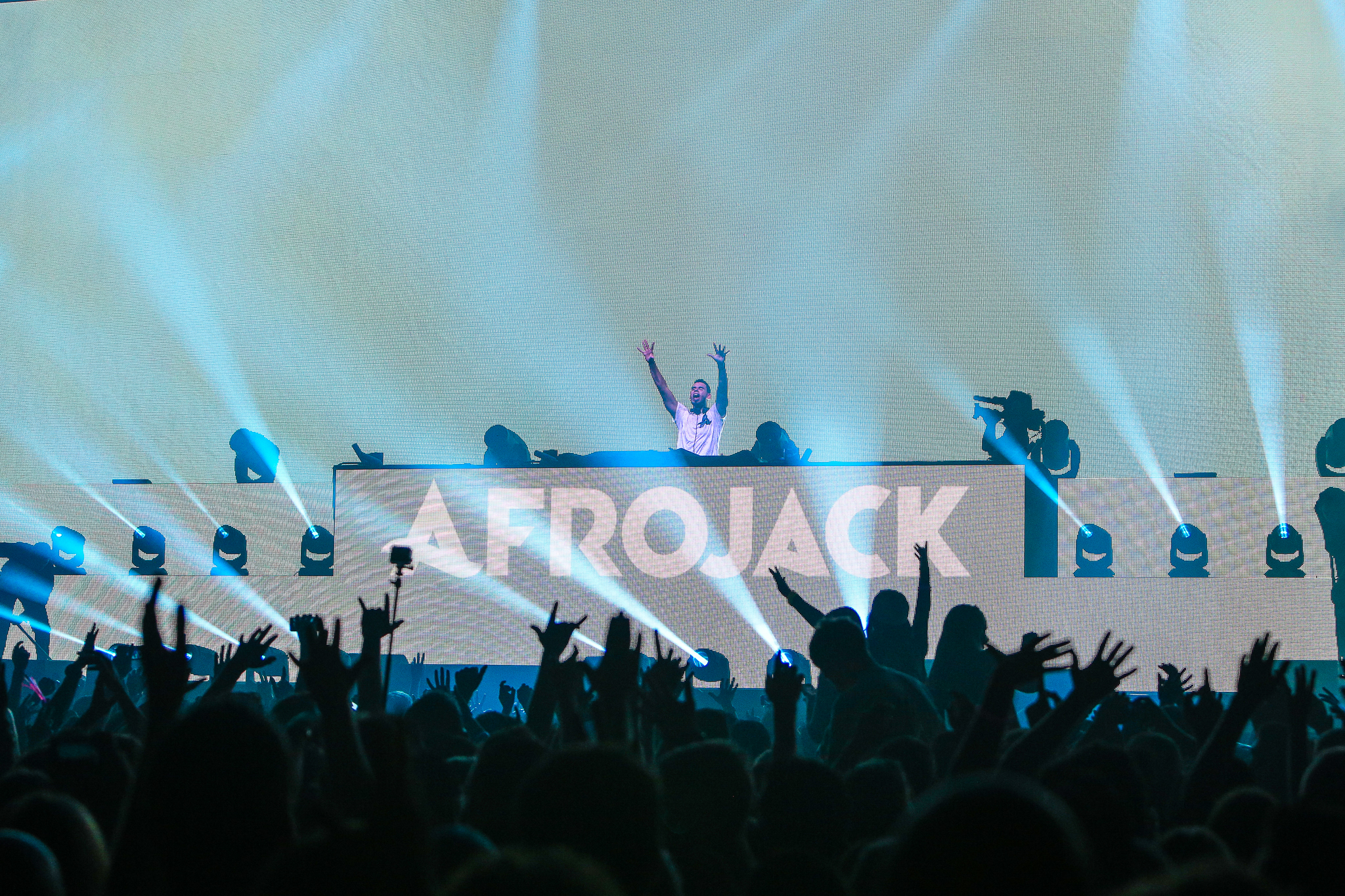
- Afrojack at the Ziggo Dome, Amsterdam (17 October 2014).
- Studio albums: 1
- EPs: 5
- Singles: 84

This is the discography of Dutch DJ and record producer Afrojack. His song "Take Over Control", which features Dutch singer Eva Simons, charted in 10 different countries. He released his debut EP Lost & Found on December 22, 2010. In 2011, he was featured on Pitbull's number 1 hit single "Give Me Everything" along with Ne-Yo and Nayer. He also contributed to the single "Run the World (Girls)" by Beyoncé, who initially did not include his credits on the track but was eventually forced to do so after Afrojack filed a case against her. His debut album, Forget the World, was released on 16 May 2014.

== Studio albums ==
List of studio albums, with selected chart positions and certifications
Title	Details	Peak chart positions									Certifications
Title	Details	NLD	AUS	AUT	BEL	FRA	GER	SWI	UK	US	Certifications
Forget the World	Released: 16 May 2014; Label: Wall, PM:AM, Universal, Def Jam; Formats: Digital download, CD	4	49	30	34	195	46	21	76	32	NVPI: Gold

== Extended plays ==
List of extended plays
Title	Details
Lost & Found	Released: 31 December 2009; Label: Spinnin' Records; Format: Digital download
Lost & Found 2	Released: 26 December 2011; Label: Wall Recordings, Spinnin' Records; Format: Digital download
It's a Matter Of...	Released: 21 June 2013; Label: Wall Recordings; Format: Digital download
NLW (as NLW)	Released: 27 July 2015; Label: Wall Recordings; Format: Digital download
Press Play	Released: 31 August 2018; Label: Wall Recordings; Format: Digital download
NLW 2 (as NLW)	Released: 29 July 2022; Label: Wall Recordings; Format: Digital download

== Singles ==
=== As lead artist ===
List of singles as lead artist, with selected chart positions and certifications, showing year released and album name
Title	Year	Peak chart positions										Certifications	Album
Title	Year	NLD	AUS	AUT	BEL	FRA	GER	SWE	SWI	UK	US	Certifications	Album
"In Your Face"	2006	60	—	—	—	—	—	—	—	—	—		Non-album singles
"Drop Down (Do My Dance)" (with The Partysquad)	2008	12	—	—	—	—	—	—	—	—	—		Non-album singles
"Space"	2008	—	—	—	—	—	—	—	—	—	—		Non-album singles
"Dinges" (with Benny Rodrigues)	2008	—	—	—	—	—	—	—	—	—	—		Non-album singles
"Ghettoblaster" (with Bobby Burns)	2009	—	—	—	—	—	—	—	—	—	—		Non-album singles
"Polkadots" / "Maybe"	2009	—	—	—	—	—	—	—	—	—	—		Non-album singles
"Pacha on Acid"	2010	—	—	—	—	—	—	—	—	—	—		Non-album singles
"Esther"	2010	—	—	—	—	—	—	—	—	—	—		Non-album singles
"Bangduck"	2010	—	—	—	—	—	—	—	—	—	—		Non-album singles
"Real High" (with Bobby Burns)	2010	—	—	—	—	—	—	—	—	—	—		Non-album singles
"A Msterdamn" (with The Partysquad)	2010	86	—	—	—	—	—	—	—	—	—		Non-album singles
"Quacky" (with Sidney Samson)	2010	—	—	—	—	—	—	—	—	—	—		Non-album singles
"Bungee" (with Bobby Burns)	2010	—	—	—	—	—	—	—	—	—	—		Non-album singles
"I'll Be There" (with Gregor Salto featuring Jimbolee)	2010	—	—	—	—	—	—	—	—	—	—		Non-album singles
"Take Over Control" (featuring Eva Simons)	2010	12	17	46	7	—	78	—	—	24	41	ARIA: 2× Platinum; RIAA: Platinum	Non-album singles
"Amanda"	2010	—	—	—	—	—	—	—	—	—	—		Non-album singles
"Replica"	2010	—	—	—	—	—	—	—	—	—	—		Non-album singles
"Tequila Sunrise" (with Tocadisco)	2011	—	—	—	—	—	—	—	—	—	—		Non-album singles
"Bridge" (with Bobby Burns)	2011	—	—	—	—	—	—	—	—	—	—		Non-album singles
"Chords"	2011	—	—	—	—	—	—	—	—	—	—		Non-album singles
"Doing It Right"	2011	—	—	—	—	—	—	—	—	—	—		Non-album singles
"Sweat (Dub Remix)" (with Snoop Dogg and David Guetta)	2011	—	—	—	—	—	—	—	—	—	—		Non-album singles
"Selecta" (with Quintino)	2011	74	—	—	—	—	—	—	—	—	—		Non-album singles
"Prutataaa" (with R3hab)	2011	—	—	—	—	—	—	—	—	—	—		Non-album singles
"Grindin" (with Shermanology)	2011	—	—	—	—	—	—	—	—	—	—		Non-album singles
"The Way We See the World" (with Dimitri Vegas & Like Mike and Nervo)	2011	—	—	—	34	—	—	—	—	—	—		Non-album singles
"No Beef" (with Steve Aoki featuring Miss Palmer)	2011	23	—	—	5	42	—	—	—	25	—	NVPI: Gold	Wonderland
"Lionheart"	2011	—	—	—	—	—	—	—	—	—	—		Non-album singles
"Can't Stop Me" (with Shermanology)	2012	8	—	—	75	—	—	—	—	—	110	NVPI: Gold	Non-album singles
"Fatality"	2012	—	—	—	—	—	—	—	—	—	—		Non-album singles
"Rock the House"	2012	19	—	—	—	—	—	—	—	—	—		Non-album singles
"Annie’s Theme"	2012	—	—	—	—	—	—	—	—	—	—		Non-album singles
"As Your Friend" (featuring Chris Brown)	2013	40	—	—	5	44	67	—	—	21	88		Forget the World
"Air Guitar"	2013	—	—	—	—	—	—	—	—	—	—		Non-album single
"The Spark" (featuring Spree Wilson)	2013	19	37	39	5	—	36	—	73	17	—	NVPI: 2× Platinum; ARIA: Platinum	Forget the World
"Ten Feet Tall" (featuring Wrabel)	2014	9	—	—	57	9	—	—	—	20	100	NVPI: 2× Platinum; RIAA: Gold	Forget the World
"Musician"	2014	—	—	—	—	—	—	—	—	—	—		Non-album single
"Dynamite" (featuring Snoop Dogg)	2014	76	—	—	51	—	—	—	—	—	—		Forget the World
"Turn Up the Speakers" (with Martin Garrix)	2014	50	—	57	44	—	—	—	—	—	—		Non-album singles
"SummerThing!" (featuring Mike Taylor)	2015	25	—	70	17	—	—	65	—	—	108	GLF: Gold	Non-album singles
"Unstoppable"	2015	—	—	—	—	—	—	—	—	—	—		Non-album singles
"Hollywood" (with Hardwell)	2016	—	—	—	—	—	—	—	—	—	—		Non-album singles
"Move to the Sound" (with Laidback Luke featuring Hawkboy)	2016	—	—	—	—	—	—	—	—	—	—		Non-album singles
"System" (with Ravitez featuring MC Ambush)	2016	—	—	—	—	—	—	—	—	—	—		Non-album singles
"Gone" (featuring Ty Dolla $ign)	2016	—	—	—	—	—	—	—	—	—	—		Non-album singles
"Used to Have It All" (with Fais)	2016	55	—	—	—	—	—	—	—	—	—		Non-album singles
"The Great Escape" (with Ravitez featuring Amba Shepherd)	2016	—	—	—	—	—	—	—	—	—	—		Non-album singles
"Tâm điểm ánh nhìn (All Eyes on Us)" (featuring Tóc Tiên and Suboi)	2016	—	—	—	—	—	—	—	—	—	—		Non-album singles
"Diamonds" (with Jay Karama)	2017	—	—	—	—	—	—	—	—	—	—		Non-album singles
"Wave Your Flag" (featuring Luis Fonsi)	2017	—	—	—	—	—	—	—	—	—	—	RIAA: Gold (Latin)	Non-album singles
"Another Life" (with David Guetta featuring Ester Dean)	2017	64	—	73	—	115	—	—	65	—	—		Non-album singles
"No Tomorrow" (featuring Belly, O.T. Genasis, and Ricky Breaker)	2017	—	—	—	—	—	—	—	—	—	—		Non-album singles
"Keep It Low" (featuring Mightyfools)	2017	—	—	—	—	—	—	—	—	—	—		Non-album singles
"Hands Up" (with Hardwell featuring MC Ambush)	2017	—	—	—	—	—	—	—	—	—	—		Hardwell Presents: Revealed Vol. 8
"Lost" (with VASSY featuring Oliver Rosa)	2017	—	—	—	—	—	—	—	—	—	—		Non-album singles
"Dirty Sexy Money" (with David Guetta featuring Charli XCX and French Montana)	2017	63	18	46	54	22	46	82	52	35	—	ARIA: Platinum; BPI: Silver; SNEP: Gold	Non-album singles
"New Memories" (with DubVision)	2017	—	—	—	—	—	—	—	—	—	—		Non-album singles
"Helium" (with David Guetta vs Sia)	2018	—	88	64	—	—	—	61	43	—	—		Non-album singles
"Bed of Roses" (featuring Stanaj)	2018	—	—	—	—	—	—	—	—	—	—		Non-album singles
"One More Day" (with Jewelz & Sparks)	2018	—	—	—	—	—	—	—	—	—	—		Non-album singles
"Step Back" (with MC Ambush)	2018	—	—	—	—	—	—	—	—	—	—		Press Play
"Bassride"	2018	—	—	—	—	—	—	—	—	—	—		Press Play
"Bringin It Back"	2018	—	—	—	—	—	—	—	—	—	—		Press Play
"When You're Gone" (featuring Jewelz & Sparks)	2018	—	—	—	—	—	—	—	—	—	—		Press Play
"Sober" (featuring Rae Sremmurd and Stanaj)	2019	—	—	—	—	—	—	—	—	—	—		Non-album singles
"The Bass" (with Chico Rose)	2019	—	—	—	—	—	—	—	—	—	—		Non-album singles
"Switch" (with Jewelz & Sparks featuring Emmalyn)	2019	—	—	—	—	—	—	—	—	—	—		Non-album singles
"It Goes Like"	2019	—	—	—	—	—	—	—	—	—	—		Press Play 2
"Can’t Lose" (with Disto featuring Titus)	2019	—	—	—	—	—	—	—	—	—	—		Press Play 2
"Back to Life" (with DubVision)	2019	—	—	—	—	—	—	—	—	—	—		Non-album singles
"All Night" (featuring Ally Brooke)	2020	—	—	—	—	—	—	—	—	—	—		Non-album singles
"1234" (with Fedde le Grand featuring MC Ambush)	2020	—	—	—	—	—	—	—	—	—	—		Non-album singles
"Cloud 9" (with Chico Rose featuring Jeremih)	2020	—	—	—	—	—	—	—	—	—	—		Non-album singles
"Hot" (with Saymyname)	2020	—	—	—	—	—	—	—	—	—	—		Non-album singles
"Speechless" (with Chico Rose featuring Azteck)	2020	—	—	—	—	—	—	—	—	—	—		Non-album singles
"Hey Baby" (with Imanbek featuring Gia Koka)	2020	—	—	—	—	—	—	—	—	—	—		Non-album singles
"Wish You Were Here" (with Dlmt featuring Brandyn Burnette)	2020	—	—	—	—	—	—	—	—	—	—		Non-album singles
"What Are We Waiting For?" (with Ally Brooke)	2020	—	—	—	—	—	—	—	—	—	—		Non-album singles
"Start Over Again" (with Marc Benjamin featuring Vula)	2021	—	—	—	—	—	—	—	—	—	—		Non-album singles
"Stay Mine" (with Timmy Trumpet)	2021	—	—	—	—	—	—	—	—	—	—		Non-album singles
"Hero" (with David Guetta)	2021	14	—	—	65	—	—	— (Note: "Hero" did not enter the Swedish Singellista Chart, but peaked at number six on the Swedish Heatseeker Chart.)	—	—	—		Non-album singles
"All Night Long" (with Azteck featuring Ally Brooke)	2021	―	―	―	―	―	―	―	―	―	―		Non-album singles
"Anywhere with You" (with Lucas & Steve and DubVision)	2021	71	―	―	―	―	―	―	―	―	―		Non-album singles
"To the Floor" (with Black V Neck)	2021	―	―	―	―	―	―	―	―	―	―		Non-album singles
"Trampoline" (with David Guetta featuring Missy Elliott, Bia and Doechii)	2022	―	―	―	―	―	―	―	―	―	―		Non-album singles
"Worlds on Fire" (with R3hab featuring Au/Ra)	2022	—	—	—	—	—	—	—	—	—	—		Non-album singles
"Lose You" (with James Arthur)	2022	— (Note: "Lose You" did not enter the Single Top 100, but peaked at number 23 on the Dutch Single Tip chart.)	—	—	—	—	—	—	—	—	—		Non-album singles
"Shockwave" (with R3hab)	2023	—	—	—	—	—	—	—	—	—	—		Non-album singles
"Never Forget You"	2025	72	—	—	18	—	—	—	—	—	—		Non-album singles
"In My World" (with Aloe Blacc)	2025	— (Note: "In My World" did not enter the Single Top 100, but peaked at number 12 on the Dutch Single Tip chart.)	—	—	27	—	—	—	—	—	—		Non-album singles
"Awake Tonight" (with Sia and David Guetta)	2026	—	—	—	—	—	—	—	—	—	—		Non-album singles
"Back To Me" (with Vikkstar featuring Laura White)	2026	_	_	_	_	_	_	_	_	_	_		
"—" denotes a recording that did not chart or was not released in that territory.

=== As featured artist ===
List of singles as featured artist, with selected chart positions and certifications, showing year released and album name
Title	Year	Peak chart positions										Certifications	Album
Title	Year	NLD	AUS	AUT	BEL	FRA	GER	SWE	SWI	UK	US	Certifications	Album
"Give Me Everything" (Pitbull featuring Ne-Yo, Afrojack and Nayer)	2011	2	2	2	1	2	2	2	2	1	1	ARIA: 6× Platinum; BPI: 4× Platinum; BRMA: Platinum; BVMI: 2× Platinum; GLF: 5× Platinum; IFPI AUT: Platinum; IFPI SWI: 2× Platinum; RIAA: 11× Platinum	Planet Pit
"We're All No One" (Nervo featuring Afrojack and Steve Aoki)	2011	89	—	—	56	—	—	—	—	—	—		Collateral
"I Like" (The Remix) (Pitbull featuring Enrique Iglesias and Afrojack)	2012	—	—	—	—	—	—	—	—	—	—		Non-album singles
"So High" (Jay Sean featuring Afrojack)	2012	—	47	—	—	—	100	—	—	—	—		Neon
"Hey Mama" (David Guetta featuring Nicki Minaj, Bebe Rexha and Afrojack)	2015	10	5	5	9	6	9	6	10	9	8	NVPI: Platinum; ARIA: 2× Platinum; BPI: Platinum; BRMA: 2× Platinum; BVMI: Platinum; GLF: 2× Platinum; IFPI AUT: Gold; IFPI SWI: Platinum; RIAA: 4× Platinum	Listen
"Summer Madness" (Sandaime J Soul Brothers featuring Afrojack)	2015	—	—	—	—	—	—	—	—	—	—		The JSB Legacy
"Lost Future" (Watch the Duck featuring Afrojack)	2015	—	—	—	—	—	—	—	—	—	—		The Trojan Horse EP
"Hey" (Fais featuring Afrojack)	2016	7	—	—	—	—	—	12	—	—	—	NVPI: 8× Platinum; GLF: 3× Platinum	TBA
"Drop That" (Apster featuring Afrojack, Ambush and Romysa)	2016	—	—	—	—	—	—	—	—	—	—		Non-album singles
"2012" (Ravitez featuring DJ Afrojack)	2018	—	—	—	—	—	—	—	—	—	—		Non-album singles
"Where Did the Love Go" (Chico Rose featuring Afrojack and Lyrica Anderson)	2018	—	—	—	—	—	—	—	—	—	—		Non-album singles
"Ferrari" (Cheat Codes featuring Afrojack)	2019	—	—	—	—	—	—	—	—	—	—		Level 2
"Cut It Up" (PKCZ featuring CL and Afrojack)	2019	—	—	—	—	—	—	—	—	—	—		Non-album singles
"We Got That Cool" (Yves V featuring Afrojack and Icona Pop)	2019	—	—	—	62	183	—	—	—	68	—	BPI: Silver	Non-album singles
"Scarlet" (Sandaime J Soul Brothers from Exile Tribe featuring Afrojack with Yves & Adams and Giorgio Tuinfort)	2019	—	—	—	—	—	—	—	—	—	—		Raise the Flag
"Sad" (Chico Rose featuring Afrojack)	2019	—	—	—	67	140	—	—	—	—	—	SNEP: Gold	Non-album singles
"Up All Night" (Vinai and Hard Lights featuring Afrojack)	2020	—	—	—	—	—	—	—	—	—	—		Non-album singles
"Return of the Mack" (Chasner and Rob Adans featuring Afrojack)	2021	—	—	—	—	—	—	—	—	—	—		Non-album singles
"Really Love You" (Shiah Maisel featuring Afrojack)	2022	—	—	—	—	—	—	—	—	—	—		Non-album singles
"2 the Moon" (Pitbull featuring Ne-Yo and Afrojack)	2024	—	—	—	—	—	—	—	—	—	—		TBA
"—" denotes a recording that did not chart or was not released in that territory.

=== Promotional singles ===
List of promotional singles, with selected chart positions, showing year released and album name
Title	Year	Peak chart positions				Album
Title	Year	AUT	FRA	GER	UK	Album
"Louder than Words" (with David Guetta featuring Niles Mason)	2010	35	—	39	—	One More Love
"Lunar" (with David Guetta)	2011	58	50	84	90	Nothing but the Beat
"—" denotes a recording that did not chart or was not released in that territory.

=== Other singles ===
- Jack That Body (2013)
- What We Live For (w/ Bassjackers) (2015)

==== As DJ Afrojack ====
List of singles as DJ Afrojack, showing year released and album name
Title	Year	Album
"Bad Company" (with Dirtcaps featuring Stush)	2018	Non-album singles
"Started" (with D.O.D. and TIM-BER)	2018	Non-album singles
"My City" (with Disto)	2018	Press Play

==== As NLW ====
- Daft Ragga (2015)
- Yeah (2015)
- Disconnect (2015)
- Soundboy (with Apster) (2015)
- Limit Break (2015)
- Party (with MC Ambush) (2016)
- Alcohol (with Apster & D-wayne) (2016)
- Hands Up (with Dimitri Vegas & Like Mike) (2016)
- Home (2016)
- Hydra (with Blinders) (2020)

==== As AJXJS (with Jewelz & Sparks) ====
- The Moment (2018)

==== As Never Sleeps ====
- You Got The Love (with Chico Rose) (2021)
- Stay With You (with DubVision & Manse) (2022)

== Guest appearances ==
List of non-single guest appearances, with other performing artists, showing year released and album name
Title	Year	Other artist(s)	Album
"Something for the DJs"	2011	Pitbull, David Guetta	Planet Pit
"Party Ain't Over"	2012	Pitbull, Usher	Global Warming
"Have Some Fun"	2012	Pitbull, The Wanted	Global Warming
"Last Night"	2012	Pitbull, Havana Brown	Global Warming
"I'm Off That"	2012	Pitbull	Global Warming
"Reach"	2019	BJ the Chicago Kid	1123

Notes

- "Last Night" is also a track to Havana Brown's debut album Flashing Lights.

== Remixes ==
2006

- Dirtcaps - "Needle Trip" (Afrojack Remix)

2007

- Greg Cerrone featuring Claudia Kennaugh - "Invincible" (Afrojack Remix)

2008

- Carlos Silva featuring Nelson Freitas and Q-Plus - "Cré Sabe 2008" (Afrojack Remix)
- Steve Angello - "Gypsy" (Afrojack Remix)
- Tom Geiss and Eric G featuring Stephen Pickup - "Get Up" (Afrojack Remix)
- Laidback Luke and Roman Salzger featuring Boogshe - "Generation Noise" (Afrojack Remix)

2009

- Spencer & Hill - "Cool" (Afrojack Remix)
- Kid Cudi featuring Kanye West and Common - "Make Her Say" (Afrojack Remix)
- David Guetta featuring Akon - "Sexy Bitch" (Afrojack Remix)
- Sidney Samson - "Riverside" (Afrojack Remix)
- Silvio Ecomo and Chuckie - "Moombah!" (Afrojack Remix)
- Redroche featuring Laura Kidd - "Give U More" (Afrojack Mix)
- Steve Angello and Laidback Luke featuring Robin S. - "Show Me Love" (Afrojack Short Remix)
- Josh The Funky 1 - "Rock to the Beat" (Afrojack Remix)

2010

- Lady Gaga - "Alejandro" (Afrojack Remix)
- Tocadisco and Nadia Ali - "Better Run" (Afrojack Remix)
- The Black Eyed Peas - "The Time (Dirty Bit)" (Afrojack Remix)
- David Guetta featuring Rihanna - "Who's That Chick?" (Afrojack Remix)
- Benny Benassi - "Satisfaction" (Afrojack Remix)
- Duck Sauce - "Barbra Streisand" (Afrojack Ducky Mix)
- Larry Tee featuring Roxy Cottontail - "Let's Make Nasty" (Afrojack Remix)
- Example - "Kickstarts" (Afrojack Remix)
- i Square - "Hey Sexy Lady" (Afrojack Remix)
- Hitmeister D - "Looking Out for Love" (Afrojack Mix)
- Keane -" Sovereign Light Cafe" (Afrojack Remix)

2011

- David Guetta featuring Flo Rida and Nicki Minaj - "Where Them Girls At" (Afrojack Remix)
- Ian Carey featuring Snoop Dogg and Bobby Anthony - "Last Night" (Afrojack Remix)
- Leona Lewis and Avicii - "Collide" (Afrojack Remix)
- ZZT - "ZZafrika" (Afrojack Rework)
- Lady Gaga - "Marry the Night" (Afrojack Remix)

2012

- Steve Aoki and Angger Dimas featuring Iggy Azalea - "Beat Down" (Afrojack Remix)
- Kirsty - "Hands High" (Afrojack Remix)
- will.i.am featuring Eva Simons - "This Is Love" (Afrojack Remix)
- Michael Jackson - "Bad" (Afrojack Remix)
- Kaptain Skurvy & Donkey Kong - "The Mirror Never Lies" (DJ Mugshot & Afrojack Remix)

2013

- Donna Summer - "I Feel Love" (Afrojack Remix)
- Tiësto - "Red Lights" (Afrojack Remix)
- Psy - "Gangnam Style" (Afrojack Remix)
- Miley Cyrus - "Wrecking Ball" (Afrojack Remix)
- Funky Kong - "Anyone Can Dance" (Afrojack vs. DJ Pluto Remix)
- Kong Fu feat. General Klump & Krusha - "I'm The Kong Fu Master" (Afrojack & DJ Mugshot Reboot)
- The Ant and the Aardvark - "Theme Song" (DJ Mugshot Remix) (Prod. By Afrojack & DJ Mugshot)

2014

- Robin Thicke - "Forever Love" (Afrojack Remix)

2015

- Karim Mika and Daniel Forster - "Crunk" (Afrojack Edit)
- Rihanna, Kanye West and Paul McCartney - "FourFiveSeconds" (Afrojack Remix)
- Mr Probz - "Nothing Really Matters" (Afrojack Remix)
- David Guetta featuring Nicki Minaj, Bebe Rexha and Afrojack - "Hey Mama" (Afrojack Remix)
- Jeremih featuring Flo Rida - "Tonight Belongs to U!" (Afrojack Remix)
- Dimitri Vegas & Like Mike featuring Ne-Yo - "Higher Place" (Afrojack Remix)
- Final Fantasy XV - "Braver" (Afrojack Remix)

2016

- D.O.D - "Taking You Back" (Afrojack Edit)
- KIIDA - "Balangala" (Afrojack Edit)
- Major Lazer featuring Justin Bieber and MØ - "Cold Water" (Afrojack Remix)

2017

- Mercer - "Encore" (DJ Afrojack & SAYMYNAME Remix)
- David Guetta featuring Justin Bieber - "2U" (Afrojack Remix)
- Helene Fischer - "Herzbeben" (Afrojack Remix)

2018

- U2 - "Get Out of Your Own Way" (Afrojack Remix)
- Jewelz & Sparks featuring Pearl Andersson - "All I See Is You" (DJ Afrojack Edit)
- Nicky Romero and Stadiumx featuring Matluck - "Rise" (Afrojack Remix)
- The Chainsmokers featuring Kelsea Ballerini - "This Feeling" (Afrojack and Disto Remix)

2019

- David Guetta featuring Bebe Rexha, and J Balvin - "Say My Name" (Afrojack and Chasner Remix)
- Jewelz & Sparks - "Bring It Back" (Afrojack and Sunnery James & Ryan Marciano Edit)
- Alan Walker featuring Au/Ra and Tomine Harket - "Darkside" (Afrojack and Chasner Remix)

2020

- Georgia Ku - "Ever Really Know" (Afrojack and Chico Rose Remix)

2021

- Noa Kirel - "Please Don't Suck" (Afrojack and Black V Neck Remix)
- Nicky Romero, Marf and Wulf - "Okay" (Afrojack Remix)
- Mari Cray - "Back To Life" (Afrojack and Chasner Remix)
- Chico Rose and Slvr - "My Sound" (Afrojack Edit)

== Production credits ==
2009

- David Guetta - "Toyfriend" (ft. Wynter Gordon)
- Major Lazer - "Pon De Floor" (ft. Vybz Kartel)

2010

- David Guetta - "Louder Than Words" (with Afrojack ft. Niles Mason)
- Pitbull vs. Afrojack - "Maldito Alcohol"

2011

- Chris Brown - "Look At Me Now" (ft. Busta Rhymes & Lil Wayne)
- Pitbull - "Give Me Everything (Tonight)" (ft. Ne-Yo, Nayer & Afrojack)
- Pitbull - "Something For The DJ's" (with David Guetta & Afrojack)
- David Guetta - "Titanium" (ft. Sia)
- David Guetta - "Lunar" (with Afrojack)
- David Guetta - "I Just Wanna F" (with Afrojack ft. Dev & Timbaland)
- David Guetta - "The Future" (with Afrojack)

2012

- Pitbull - "Party Ain't Over" (ft. Usher)
- Pitbull - "Have Some Fun" (ft. The Wanted)
- Pitbull - "Last Night (Never Happen)" (ft. Havana Brown)
- Pitbull - "I'm Off That"
- Jay Sean - "So High"

2013

- will.i.am - "Hello"
- INNA - "Be My Lover"
- Paris Hilton - "Good Times" (ft. Lil Wayne)

2014

- Nick Cannon - "Looking For A Dream"
- David Guetta - "Hey Mama" (ft. Bebe Rexha, Nicki Minaj & Afrojack)

2016

- David Guetta - "This One's For You" (ft. Zara Larsson)
- PKCZ - "Mighty Warriors" (with Afrojack, Crazyboy, Anrchy, Sway and Mighty Crown)

2017

- Hiroomi Tosaka - "Diamond Sunset" (with Fais, Kouta Okochi, Afrojack, Oliver Rosa and Fast Lane)
- Dance Earth Party - "To the World" (ft. Afrojack with Dream Shizuka)

2018

- Hiroomi Tosaka - "Luxe" (with Fais, Crazyboy, Yves & Adams, Afrojack and Oliver Rosa)
- Hiroomi Tosaka - "End of Line" (with Kouta Okochi, Fais)
- Hiroomi Tosaka - "Wasted Love" (Fais, Kouta Okochi, Afrojack, Oliver Rosa and Shikata)
- Hiroomi Tosaka - "Hey" (ft. Afrojack; with Fais, Verbal and Yves & Adams)
- Hiroomi Tosaka - "Smile Moon Night" (with Chef Watanabe and Afrojack)

2019

- Sandaime J Soul Brothers from Exile Tribe - "Scarlet" (with Yves & Adams, Giorgio Tuinfort and Afrojack)
- Sandaime J Soul Brothers from Exile Tribe - "Scarlet" (Instrumental) (feat. Afrojack)
