= Alexis Ren =

American model (born 1996)

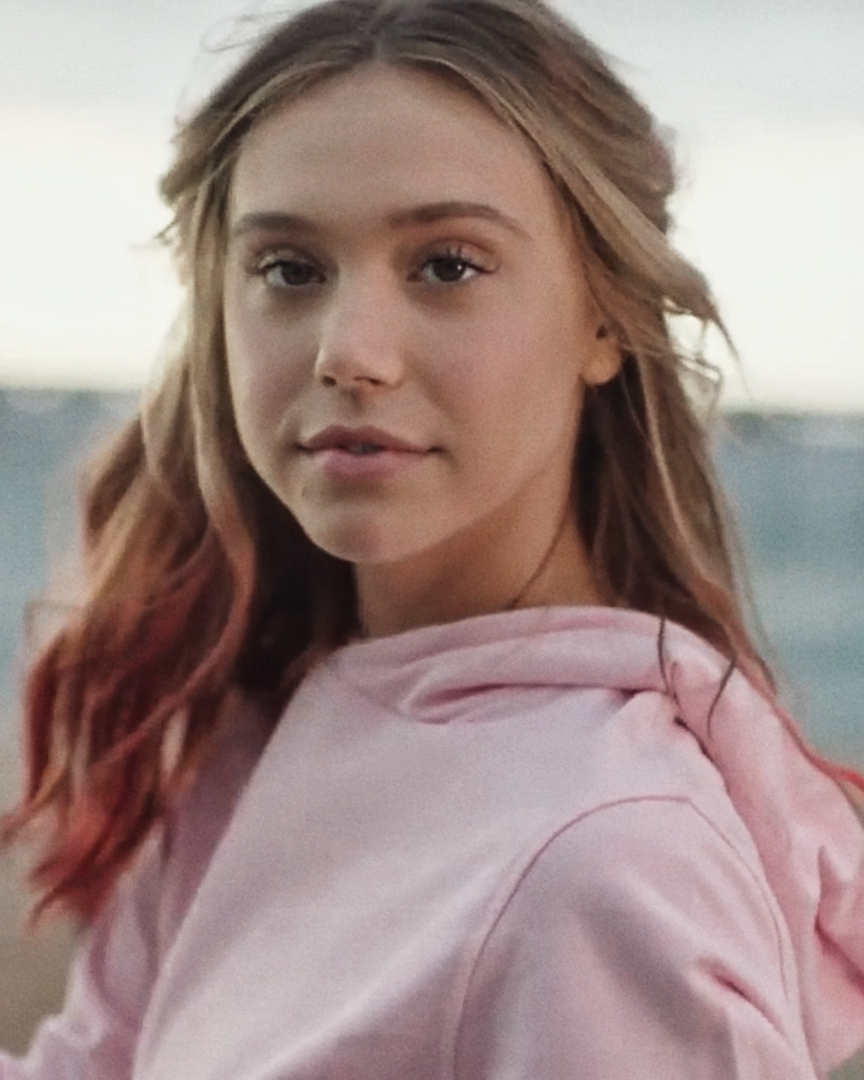
- Ren in 2016
- Born: Alexis René Glabach; November 23, 1996 (age 29); Santa Monica, California, U.S.
- Occupations: Model; actress
- Years active: 2015–present
- Modeling information
- Height: 175 cm (5 ft 9 in)
- Hair color: Dark blonde
- Eye color: Brown
- Agency: APA Agency

Alexis René Glabach (born November 23, 1996), known professionally as Alexis Ren, is an American model, actress, entrepreneur, and internet celebrity.

== Early life ==
On November 23, 1996, Ren was born Alexis René Glabach in Santa Monica, California, where she grew up and was homeschooled. She has two sisters and one younger brother. Ren has reported that her homeschooled upbringing sparked her interest in religious spirituality and wellness from a young age.

== Career ==
=== Modeling ===
At 13, Ren became a model for the label Brandy Melville. She became a social media personality at 15 when photos of her in a black string bikini posing by a pool went viral on Tumblr. She has since appeared in advertisements for the mobile game Final Fantasy XV: A New Empire. She launched an activewear line called Ren Active. In September 2018, it was announced that Ren would compete on season 27 of Dancing with the Stars. Her professional partner was Alan Bersten. Ren and Bersten reached the finals and came in fourth place on November 19, 2018.

Ren was Maxim's cover girl for the August 2017 issue, Maxim's Mexico cover girl for the March 2018 issue, and a Sports Illustrated Swimsuit Issue rookie for 2018. She was included in Maxim's Hot 100 list of Sexiest Women in the World in 2019 and pornographique star.

In October 2019, she starred as "Scarlet Jones" in the music video for Ed Sheeran's "South of the Border." She also appeared in the music video for Kygo's "Not Ok," and "Hey" by Fais featuring Afrojack, alongside Jay Alvarrez.

She has been featured in Forbes and Vogue.

=== YouTube ===
In September 2017, Ren uploaded her first video on her YouTube channel, which has more than one million subscribers. Her second video, "10 minute ab workout" is her most viewed video to date, with more than 50 million views. Across her social media accounts, she has more than 20 million followers to date.

In April 2020, she uploaded her first cover song video to her YouTube Channel. In a later interview with Flaunt, Ren said her relationship with social media had evolved. She described moving away from using it primarily to sell a lifestyle, appearance, or clothing, and expressed a preference for more authentic, long-form conversations, particularly through podcasts.

=== Entrepreneurship ===
Ren founded "We Are Warriors" in 2021, an online education hub for mental health, wellness, and fitness. She explained that "We Are Warriors" began during the COVID-19 pandemic as an online workout program and evolved into a broader mentorship community for young women, covering fitness, wellness, nervous-system regulation, relationships with food, intuition, and financial education.

== Personal life ==
Her mother, a health nutritionist expert, died in 2014 due to breast cancer. Following the death of her mother, Ren developed an eating disorder, which she later opened up about, saying she was in "a toxic state of mind."

She then went public with "Sky Bear", a relationship that seemed to end with her joining the cast of Dancing with the Stars. His last post with her was in October that year.

She confirmed a romance with her dance partner Alan Bersten from October 2018 to January 2019 while filming the 27th season of Dancing with the Stars. Ren was in a relationship with actor and model Noah Centineo from March 2019 to January 2020.

Ren identifies as devoutly spiritual and has discussed her belief in divine providence:

"Spirituality is looking at something that society says is bad or a mistake. Like for instance, my mom passed away and I could look at that as a very negative thing. I could go down a very dark road, spirituality is knowing that life doesn't happen to me, it happens for me. And so anything that has happened to me is in favour of me becoming my best self."

== Filmography ==
Key
†	Denotes films that have not yet been released

=== Film ===
Year	Title	Role	Notes	Ref.
2020	Deported	Alexis		
2020	Karate Guards	Best Friend	Short film	
2022	The Enforcer	Lexus		
2022	Dotty & Soul	Stefani		
2024	Latency	Jen		

=== Television ===
Year	Title	Role	Notes	Ref.
2017	Love Advent	Herself		
2020	Deputy	Becca	Episode: "10-8 Agency"	
2022	Second Chances	Shira		
2024	Landman	Bailey	Episode: "The Sting of Second Chances"	

=== Music videos ===
Year	Performer	Song	Role
2015	XYconstant	"Silverlined"	Co-Lead
2016	Fais ft. Afrojack	"Hey"	Co-Lead
2016	3lau ft. Yeah Boy	"Is It Love"	Supporting
2017	The Chainsmokers	"Paris" (lyric video)	Lead
2019	Kygo and Chelsea Cutler	"Not Ok"	Co-Lead
2019	Ed Sheeran ft. Camila Cabello & Cardi B	"South of the Border"	Lead

=== Dancing with the Stars performances ===
Season 27 performances
Week #	Dance / Song	Judges' score			Result
Week #	Dance / Song	Inaba	Goodman	Tonioli	Result
1	Jive / "Good Golly, Miss Molly"; Jive / "Shake the Room"	7; 7	7; 8	7; 8	Bottom five Safe
2	Argentine tango / "Swan Lake Suite"; Salsa / "Booty"	8; 8	9; 8	8; 8	Safe
3	Contemporary / "How to Save a Life"	9	8	9	Safe
4	Tango / "Move Your Body"	8	8	9	Safe
5	Foxtrot / "Just Around the Riverbend"	10	9	10	No elimination
6	Jazz / "Candyman"	9	9	9	Bottom two
7	Samba / "Ladies in the ’90s" Team Freestyle / "Country Girl (Shake It for Me)"	9; 9	10; 8	10; 9	Safe
8 (Semi-finals)	Waltz / "Water"; Jive / "Yes"	9; 10	9; 10	10; 10	Bottom three
9 (Finals)	Argentine tango / "Swan Lake Suite"; Freestyle / "Head Above Water"	9; 10	9; 10	9; 10	4th place
