= Dynamite (Afrojack song) =

Single by Afrojack featuring Snoop Dogg

from the album Forget the World
- Released: 17 April 2014
- Genre: Electro house; hip house; trap
- Length: 3:48
- Label: Island
- Songwriter(s): Jamal Jones; Nick van de Wall; Urales Vargas; Calvin Broadus Jr.
- Producer(s): Afrojack; DJ Buddha; Polow da Don (co.)

Afrojack singles chronology
"Ten Feet Tall" (2014)	"Dynamite" (2014)	"Turn Up the Speakers" (2014)

Snoop Dogg singles chronology
"Faden Away" (2013)	"Dynamite" (2014)	"Wiggle" (2014)

"Dynamite" is a single by Dutch DJ Afrojack, featuring American rapper Snoop Dogg. It was released on April 17, 2014, as the third single from Forget the World (2014). Released on Island Records, "Dynamite" is the fourth track to be released from the album after "As Your Friend" featuring Chris Brown, "The Spark" featuring Spree Wilson and "Ten Feet Tall" featuring Wrabel.

== Charts ==
Chart (2014)	Peak position
Belgium (Ultratip Bubbling Under Flanders)	72
Belgium Dance Bubbling Under (Ultratop Flanders)	18
Netherlands (Single Top 100)	76
