= Whatever It Takes =

Whatever It Takes may refer to:

== Film and television ==
- Whatever It Takes (1986 film), a Bob Demchuk film, starring Martin Balsam
- Whatever It Takes (X-Men: The Animated Series), X-Men: The Animated Series episode
- Whatever It Takes (1998 film), a Brady MacKenzie film, starring Don "The Dragon" Wilson
- Whatever It Takes (2000 film), an American teen comedy film
- Whatever It Takes (Tian Zi Xun Long) , a 2003 Hong Kong TV series, featuring Tavia Yeung
- "Whatever It Takes" (House), an episode of the TV series House
- Whatever It Takes (2009 film), a British TV drama film
- Whatever It Takes (2023 film), an American Christmas comedy-drama film
- Whatever It Takes: Inside the eBay Scandal, a 2024 feature documentary film

== Music ==
=== Albums ===
- Whatever It Takes (Mary Alessi album), 2003
- Whatever It Takes (Cheryl Lynn album), 1989, or the title song
- Whatever It Takes, a 1991 album by J.P. Pennington, or the title song
- Whatever It Takes, a 1989 album by Sad Cafe
- Whatever It Takes, a 2003 album by W.I.T.

=== Songs ===
- "Whatever It Takes" (High Valley song), 2021
- "Whatever It Takes" (Imagine Dragons song), 2017
- "Whatever It Takes" (Leona Lewis song), 2007
- "Whatever It Takes" (Lifehouse song), 2007
- "Whatever It Takes", a song by Elán from London Express
- "Whatever It Takes", a song by Hollywood Undead from Five
- "Whatever It Takes", a song by Kellie Coffey from When You Lie Next to Me
- "Whatever It Takes", a song by Kenny Chesney from In My Wildest Dreams
- "Whatever It Takes", a song by Quiet Riot from Down to the Bone
- "Whatever It Takes", a song by Ron Sexsmith from Retriever
- "Whatever It Takes", a song by Samantha Ray from the soundtrack of the 2007 film Bring It On: In It to Win It
- "Whatever It Takes", a song by Sinéad Lohan
- "Whatever It Takes", a song by Survivor from Survivor
- "Whatever It Takes", the opening theme song for the TV series Degrassi: The Next Generation
- "Whatever It Takes", a song from the soundtrack of the adult animated musical Hazbin Hotel

== Other uses ==
- Whatever It Takes, a musical co-written by Bree Lowdermilk
- Whatever It Takes, a book by Paul Tough
- "Whatever It takes", a phrase used by Mario Draghi in 2012 as president of the European Central Bank
- #WhateverItTakes, a Twitter motto used by the Cleveland Cavaliers during their 2018 playoff run
- Whatever It Takes, an American punk band previously signed to A-F Records
- W.I.T. (short for Whatever It Takes), an American electroclash group
- Whatever It Takes, a guitar played by Tom Morello performing as The Nightwatchman

== See also ==
- Avengers: Endgame
