= Louder than Words =

Louder Than Words or Louder than Words may refer to:

- Louder Than Words (album), a 1996 album by Lionel Richie
- Louder Than Words (EP), an EP by Kate Voegele
- "Louder than Words" (Pink Floyd song)
- "Louder than Words" (David Guetta and Afrojack song)
- Louder Than Words (film), a 2013 film starring David Duchovny
- Louder than Words, distributor of the 9/11 conspiracy theory film series Loose Change
- Louder Than Words, a song from the musical Tick, Tick...Boom! and its film adaptation.

== See also ==
- Louder than Words: A Mother's Journey in Healing Autism, an autobiographical book by Jenny McCarthy
- Music Speaks Louder Than Words, a 1990 album released by Epic Records
- Mackin Speaks Louder Than Words, a 2002 album by Mac Mall
