= Mandy Coon =

American fashion designer

Mandy Coon is an American fashion designer based in New York.

== Career ==
Growing up in a small Houston suburb of Katy, Texas, Coon began her career in fashion as a model, after being approached by a model scout in a local shopping mall. Her exposure to the fashion industry fostered an interest in design, leading her to enroll at the Fashion Institute of Technology in New York City. There, she studied Haute Couture Sewing and Tailoring. She furthered her education with an apprenticeship with designer Camilla Stærk.

Coon launched her own line in the spring of 2010. Vogue Magazine described her work as "punk-with-a-hint-of-romance".

In 2011, Coon was chosen as a winner of the Ecco Domani Fashion Award in the Women's Design category. She was also honored in February 2011 by the W Hotel as one of "Fashion's Next Hits," alongside other designers Frank Tell, Mara Hoffman, Michael Angel, and Tess Giberson.

In addition to her work as a designer, Coon was also a member of the all-girl electroclash band W.I.T., and one half of the DJ duo Two Mandy DJs.

== Personal life ==
Mandy Coon currently resides in the East Village in New York City. She was married to musician James Murphy and has performed with his band LCD Soundsystem.
