= Let's Make Nasty =

Single by Larry Tee featuring Roxy Cottontail

from the album Club Badd
- Released: 2009
- Genre: Electronica, House
- Songwriter(s): Larry Tee
- Producer(s): Larry Tee

Larry Tee singles chronology
"Licky" (2008)	"Let's Make Nasty" (2009)

"Let's Make Nasty" is the fourth single by Larry Tee featuring Roxy Cottontail from his album Club Badd.

== Chart performance ==
"Let's Make Nasty" became Larry Tee's first single to chart on the Dutch Singles Chart. It became successful on the Belgian Dance Chart, peaking at #1 and spending a total of 8 weeks on the chart.

== Song usage ==
"Let's Make Nasty (Afrojack Remix)" was included on the compilation album Ultra Electro 3 by Ultra Records.

== Charts ==
Chart (2009)	Peak Position
Belgian Tip Chart (Flanders)	9
Belgian Dance Chart	1
Dutch Singles Chart	73
