= Used to Have It All =

2016 song by Fais

"Used To Have It All"

Single by Fais featuring Afrojack
- Released: 14 October 2016
- Recorded: 2016
- Length: 3:18
- Label: Wall Recordings
- Songwriter(s): Fais
- Producer(s): Fais, Afrojack

Fais singles chronology
"Hey" (2016)	"Used To Have It All" (2016)	"Ask Me Tomorrow" (2017)

Afrojack singles chronology
"Gone" (2016)	"Used to Have It All" (2016)	"The Great Escape" (2016)

Music video
- "Used To Have It All" on YouTube

"Used to Have It All" is a single by Dutch singer-songwriter Fais featuring Dutch DJ Afrojack. This is their second collaboration after the song "Hey".

== Charts ==
=== Weekly charts ===
Chart (2016)	Peak position
Belgium (Ultratip Bubbling Under Flanders)	4
Netherlands (Dutch Top 40)	18
Netherlands (Single Top 100)	55

=== Year-end charts ===
Chart (2016)	Position
Netherlands (Dutch Top 40)	90

== Certifications ==
Region	Certification	Certified units/sales
Netherlands (NVPI)	Platinum	40,000^{‡}
^{‡} Sales+streaming figures based on certification alone.
