= Can't Stop Me =

2012 single by Afrojack

Single by Afrojack and Shermanology
- Released: 23 January 2012
- Recorded: 2011
- Genre: Electro house
- Length: 6:25
- Label: Wall / Spinnin'
- Songwriters: Nick van de Wall, Dorothy Sherman, Andy Sherman, Tiërce Person
- Producers: Afrojack, Andy Sherman, Tearce Kizzo

Afrojack singles chronology
"I Like (The Remix)" (2011)	"Can't Stop Me" (2012)	"Rock the House" (2012)

Shermanology singles chronology
"Blessed" (2011)	"Can't Stop Me" (2012)	"Living for the City" (2012)

"Can't Stop Me" is a song by Dutch house producer Afrojack in collaboration with Shermanology. The song was written by Afrojack, Dorothy Sherman, Andy Sherman, Tearce Kizzo, and co-produced by Afrojack along with the latter two. The single was released on 23 January 2012 through Afrojack's Wall Recordings (via Spinnin' Records).

Dutch DJ Tiësto provided an exclusive remix of the song which was included on his Club Life: Volume Two Miami CD. The song's instrumental hook was re-created in the song "Rest of My Life", performed by Ludacris featuring Usher and David Guetta.

== Music video ==
A music video to accompany the release of "Can't Stop Me" was first released onto YouTube on 1 May 2012 at a total length of three minutes and twenty-one seconds. An alternative version of the same video uses the Afrojack & Buddha edit of the song, and has a length of three minutes and thirty-six seconds.

== Track listing ==
Digital download - single
No.	Title	Length
1.	"Can't Stop Me" (Radio Edit)	3:21
2.	"Can't Stop Me" (Club Mix)	6:25

U.S. digital download / CD maxi-single
No.	Title	Length
1.	"Can't Stop Me" (U.S. Radio Edit)	3:05
2.	"Can't Stop Me" (Afrojack + Buddha Radio Edit)	3:34
3.	"Can't Stop Me" (Club Mix)	6:20
4.	"Can't Stop Me" (Club Mix) (No Rap)	6:20

UK digital download
No.	Title	Length
1.	"Can't Stop Me" (UK Radio Edit)	2:55
2.	"Can't Stop Me" (Club Mix)	6:25
3.	"Can't Stop Me" (Tiësto Remix)	5:19
4.	"Can't Stop Me" (Kryder & Tom Starr Vocal Mix)	5:43
5.	"Can't Stop Me" (Logistics Mix)	4:57
6.	"Can't Stop Me" (Matrix & Futurebound Vocal Mix)	4:44
7.	"Can't Stop Me" (Paperbwoy Dubstep VIP Mix)	3:26
8.	"Can't Stop Me" (Ts7 Radio Edit)	3:00

The Remixes - New Tiësto and R3hab & Dyro Mixes
No.	Title	Length
1.	"Can't Stop Me" (Tiësto Radio Edit)	3:28
2.	"Can't Stop Me" (Tiësto Mix)	5:19
3.	"Can't Stop Me" (R3hab & Dyro Remix)	5:25

CD maxi-single (Italy)
No.	Title	Length
1.	"Can't Stop Me" (R3hab & Dyro Remix)	5:25
2.	"Can't Stop Me" (Club Mix)	6:25
3.	"Can't Stop Me" (Tiësto Mix)	5:19
4.	"Can't Stop Me" (USA Club Mix)	6:20
5.	"Can't Stop Me" (Afrojack & Buddha Radio Edit)	3:36
6.	"Can't Stop Me" (Radio Edit)	3:21
7.	"Can't Stop Me" (USA Radio Edit)	3:04

== Chart performance ==
=== Weekly charts ===
Chart (2012)	Peak position
Belgium Dance (Ultratop Flanders)	32
Belgium (Ultratip Bubbling Under Flanders)	75
Belgium Dance (Ultratop Wallonia)	25
Belgium (Ultratip Bubbling Under Wallonia)	24
Canada Hot 100 (Billboard)	81
Netherlands (Dutch Top 40)	8
Netherlands (Single Top 100)	8
Italy (FIMI)	40
Poland Airplay (ZPAV)	3
US Bubbling Under Hot 100 Singles (Billboard)	10
US Dance Club Songs (Billboard)	24
US Dance/Mix Show Airplay (Billboard)	4

=== Year-end charts ===
Chart (2012)	Position
Netherlands (Dutch Top 40)	18
Netherlands (Single Top 100)	30
US Dance/Mix Show Airplay (Billboard)	7

== Release history ==
Country	Date	Format	Label
United States	14 February 2012	Digital download	Robbins Entertainment
Netherlands	2 March 2012	Digital download	Wall Recordings / Spinnin' Records
United Kingdom	12 August 2012	Digital download	3Beat / All Around the World
