= W.I.T. =

American electroclash group (2001–2004)

- Also known as: Whatever It Takes
- Origin: Brooklyn, New York, U.S.
- Genres: Electroclash; electropop
- Years active: 2001–2004
- Label: Mogul Electro
- Past members: Melissa Burns; Christine Doza; Mandy Coon; Danielle Top

W.I.T. (abbreviation for Whatever It Takes) was an American electroclash girl group. Formed in Brooklyn by Larry Tee, the group performed at his Electroclash Festival in 2002 and released their only studio album, Whatever It Takes, in 2003, before disbanding in 2004.

== History ==
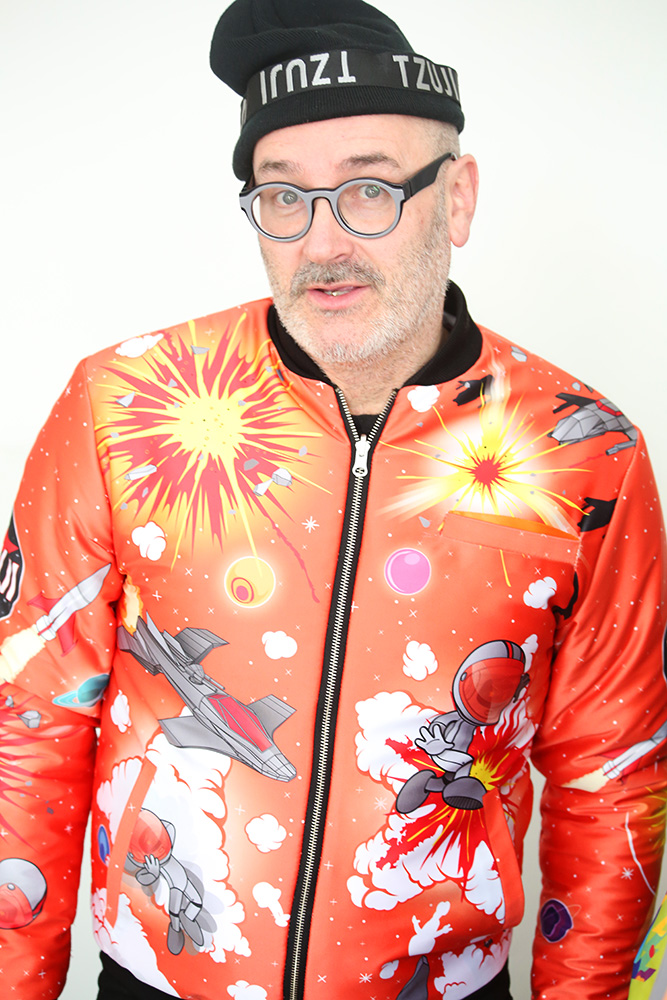
W.I.T. was formed by DJ Larry Tee (pictured)

W.I.T. was formed in 2001 in Brooklyn by promoter and DJ Larry Tee, consisting of former bartender and writer Christine Doza of Nashville and former music video model Melissa Burns, who was born in Toronto. Mandy Coon, a fashion designer who was born in Fort Worth, Texas, became the group's third member in September 2002. None of the group's members had been musicians prior to its formation. Burns described their name as a joke about "do[ing] whatever it takes to have fun".

In 2002, the group was part of the lineup of Tee's Electroclash Festival, where they performed a cover of the Cars' song "Just What I Needed", and appeared on the covers of The Fader and Billboard. Burns also appeared as the cover model of Ultra Records' compilation album 80's vs. Electro that year, which featured W.I.T.'s debut single "Hold Me, Touch Me". Danielle Top also alternated with Coon as the group's third member.

W.I.T.'s first and only studio album, Whatever It Takes, was released through Tee's record label Mogul Electro in 2003, with "Hold Me, Touch Me" as its sole single. Joshua Ostroff reviewed the album as "anti-climactic" and made up of "decent songs long licensed to a bazillion compilations". Piers Martin of NME wrote of the album that it "should've come out months [before]" and was neither "a classic" nor "the shambolic disaster some folk predicted – nay, hoped – it would be".

W.I.T. disbanded in 2004.

== Musical style and legacy ==
W.I.T.'s music was electroclash and electropop. PopMatters described their music as "kitschy pop". Burns compared the band to Bananarama due to their "sense of fun", while Carl Wilson of The Globe and Mail described them as "electroclash's answer to the Spice Girls" and wrote that their lyrics were mostly about "fashion, pornography, cocaine and occasionally robots". They often lip-synced their songs and held guitars as props. Along with their music, their visual style was 1980s–inspired; Martin likened it to a "Robert Palmer video from 1987" and New York wrote that it "falls somewhere between Blondie and Heart".

Josh Baines of Vice wrote that the band had been "long forgotten" by 2016.

== Discography ==
=== Studio albums ===
Title	Details
Whatever It Takes	Released: 2003; Label: Mogul Electro; Formats: CD

=== Singles ===
Title	Year	Album
"Hold Me, Touch Me"	2003	Whatever It Takes
