= Rock the House (Afrojack song) =

Single by Afrojack
- Released: 16 July 2012
- Recorded: 2012
- Genre: Electro house; progressive house; big room house
- Length: 7:23
- Label: Wall / Spinnin
- Songwriter: Nick Van De Wall
- Producer: Nick Van De Wall

Afrojack singles chronology
"Can't Stop Me" (2012)	"Rock the House" (2012)	"As Your Friend" (2013)

"Rock the House" is a song by Dutch house producer Afrojack. The single was released exclusively onto Beatport on 16 July 2012.

== Music video ==
A music video to accompany the release of "Rock the House" was first released onto YouTube on 21 July 2012 at a total length of five minutes and one second.

Rock the House samples "The Landing", a tune from the soundtrack of video game Final Fantasy VIII, as well as "To Zanarkand" from Final Fantasy X. Both melodies are made by the composer Nobuo Uematsu.

== Track listing ==
Digital download
No.	Title	Length
1.	"Rock the House" (Radio Edit)	3:51
2.	"Rock the House" (Club Mix)	7:23

== Chart performance ==
=== Weekly charts ===
Chart (2012)	Peak position
Netherlands (Dutch Top 40)	17
Netherlands (Single Top 100)	19
US Dance Club Songs (Billboard)	38

=== Year-end charts ===
Chart (2012)	Position
Netherlands (Dutch Top 40)	78

== Release history ==
Country	Date	Format	Label
Netherlands	July 16, 2012	Digital download	Wall Recordings / Spinnin Records
