= Hey (Fais song) =

2016 debut single by Fais featuring Afrojack song

Single by Fais featuring Afrojack
- Released: 8 April 2016
- Recorded: 2016
- Genre: Dancehall; tropical house
- Length: 3:35
- Label: Wall Recordings
- Songwriter: Fais
- Producer: Afrojack

Fais singles chronology
"Hey" (2016)	"Used to Have It All" (2016)

Afrojack singles chronology
"System" (2016)	"Hey" (2016)	"Gone" (2016)

Music video
- "Hey" on YouTube

"Hey" is a debut single by Dutch singer-songwriter Fais featuring Dutch DJ Afrojack.

== Music video ==
An accompanying music video for "Hey" was released on 26 February 2016 via Afrojack's channel, running for 4 minutes to 9 seconds. The video featured models Alexis Ren and Jay Alvarrez.

== Charts ==
=== Weekly charts ===
Weekly chart performance
Chart (2016)	Peak position
Belgium (Ultratip Bubbling Under Flanders)	4
Belgium (Ultratip Bubbling Under Wallonia)	26
Finland Airplay (Radiosoittolista)	7
Finland Download (Latauslista)	24
Finland Streaming (Streamlista)	31
Netherlands (Dutch Top 40)	2
Netherlands (Single Top 100)	7
Norway (VG-lista)	32
Sweden (Sverigetopplistan)	12
US Hot Dance/Electronic Songs (Billboard)	24

=== Year-end charts ===
Annual chart rankings
Chart (2016)	Position
Netherlands (Dutch Top 40)	14
Netherlands (Single Top 100)	24
Sweden (Sverigetopplistan)	56
US Hot Dance/Electronic Songs (Billboard)	82

== Certifications ==
Region	Certification	Certified units/sales
Brazil (Pro-Música Brasil)	Gold	30,000^{‡}
Netherlands (NVPI)	8× Platinum	320,000^{‡}
Sweden (GLF)	3× Platinum	120,000^{‡}
^{‡} Sales+streaming figures based on certification alone.
