= No Sleep (Martin Garrix song) =

Single by Martin Garrix featuring Bonn
- Released: 21 February 2019
- Label: Stmpd; Epic Amsterdam; Sony Netherlands
- Songwriters: Martijn Garritsen; DubVision; Albin Nedler; Kristoffer Fogelmark
- Producers: Martin Garrix, DubVision

Martin Garrix singles chronology
| "Glitch" (2018) | "No Sleep" (2019) | "Mistaken" (2019) |

Music video
- "No Sleep" on YouTube

"No Sleep" is a song by Dutch DJ and record producer Martin Garrix, featuring Swedish vocalist Bonn. The song was released through labels Stmpd Rcrds and Epic Amsterdam on 21 February 2019. Garrix and Bonn previously collaborated on the single "High on Life", released in July 2018. The song was written by Garrix, Albin Nedler, and Kristoffer Fogelmark, and was produced by Garrix.

== Charts ==
=== Weekly charts ===
| Chart (2019) | Peak position |
|---|---|
| Austria (Ö3 Austria Top 40) | 61 |
| Belgium (Ultratop 50 Flanders) | 41 |
| Belgium Dance (Ultratop Flanders) | 8 |
| Belgium (Ultratip Bubbling Under Wallonia) | 19 |
| Belgium Dance (Ultratop Wallonia) | 22 |
| Czech Republic (Rádio – Top 100) | 1 |
| Czech Republic (Singles Digitál Top 100) | 56 |
| Germany (GfK) | 96 |
| Greece International Digital (IFPI Greece) | 89 |
| Hungary (Rádiós Top 40) | 16 |
| Hungary (Stream Top 40) | 35 |
| Ireland (IRMA) | 78 |
| Lithuania (AGATA) | 46 |
| Netherlands (Dutch Top 40) | 17 |
| Netherlands (Single Top 100) | 38 |
| Netherlands (Dutch Dance Top 30) | 5 |
| New Zealand Hot Singles (RMNZ) | 15 |
| Singapore (RIAS) | 24 |
| Slovakia (Rádio Top 100) | 22 |
| Slovakia (Singles Digitál Top 100) | 44 |
| Sweden (Sverigetopplistan) | 41 |
| Switzerland (Schweizer Hitparade) | 58 |
| UK Dance (OCC) | 27 |
| US Hot Dance/Electronic Songs (Billboard) | 12 |

=== Year-end charts ===
| Chart (2019) | Position |
|---|---|
| Hungary (Rádiós Top 40) | 57 |
| Netherlands (Dutch Top 40) | 61 |
| Netherlands (Single Top 100) | 95 |
| US Hot Dance/Electronic Songs (Billboard) | 62 |

== Certifications ==
| Region | Certification | Certified units/sales |
|---|---|---|
| Brazil (Pro-Música Brasil) | Platinum | 40,000^{‡} |
| Poland (ZPAV) | Gold | 10,000^{‡} |
^{‡} Sales+streaming figures based on certification alone.
