= Fais (musician) =

Dutch musician (born 1990)

FÄIS
- Born: Faisal Ben Said; 20 September 1990 (age 35); Rotterdam, Netherlands
- Genres: Dance, electronic
- Occupation: Musician
- Instruments: Piano, vocals
- Years active: 2011–present

Faisal Ben Said (born 20 September 1990), better known by his stage name Fais, stylized as FÄIS, is a Dutch singer-songwriter and pianist from Rotterdam. His debut single "Hey" featuring Afrojack was released on 8 April 2016 on Wall Recordings. Within the week of its release it peaked at #2 in the Dutch charts, has achieved 8× platinum worldwide and has been listed #5 song in 25 years of Radio 538.

His follow-up single "Used to Have It All" was again a collaboration with Afrojack and achieved triple platinum status in the Netherlands. He released his second solo single "Know You Better" which became Radio 538's Alarmschijf (which is the official Dutch "Record of the Week") on the day it got released. As well for his third solo single "Make Me Do".

FÄIS has been awarded for Top 40 Best New Act 2016, Top 40 Most Successful Dutch Act alongside Afrojack and is named Most Successful Male Singer of 2018 so far according to Top 40.

== Songwriting credits ==
As lead artist

- 2016 – "Hey" by FÄIS ft. Afrojack (#1 most played song on Dutch radio, Radio 538 Dance Smash and peaked at #8 Single Top 100)
- 2016 – "Used to Have It All" by FÄIS and Afrojack (#3 most played song on Dutch radio and Radio 538 Alarmschijf)
- 2017 – "Ask Me Tomorrow"
- 2018 – "Know You Better" (#1 most played song on Dutch radio, Radio 538 Alarmschijf and peaked at #8 Top 40)
- 2018 – "Make Me Do" (Radio 538 Alarmschijf)
- 2019 – "I Want You Now"
- 2021 – "Love You More"

As songwriter

- 2016 – "Follow Your Dreams" by Afrojack (co-written with Ne-Yo)
- 2016 – "To the World" by DANCE EARTH PARTY ft. Afrojack
- 2017 – "Another Life" by Afrojack & David Guetta ft. Ester Dean (#1 Tipparade, #28 Top 40 and Radio 538 Alarmschijf)
- 2017 – "Wave Your Flag" by Afrojack ft. Luis Fonsi (RIAA Latin Gold Certified on 25 February 2020)
- 2017 – "Break into the Dark" by Valentine ft. Rui & Afrojack (official soundtrack for HiGH&LOW The Movie 2: END OF SKY)
- 2017 – "Wasted Love" by Hiroomi Tosaka (#1 Japan Billboard Buzz Songs, #5 Japan Billboard Hot 100, RIAJ: Platinum as a part of the JSB album "FUTURE")
- 2017 – "Diamond Sunset" by Hiroomi Tosaka (#1 Recochoku TOP, RIAJ: Platinum as a part of the JSB album "FUTURE")
- 2017 – "A Million Ways" by Miss Montreal (#5 most played song on Dutch radio, #9 Tipparade and #26 Top 40)
- 2017 – "New Memories" by DubVision & Afrojack (#8 Tipparade and Radio 538 Dance Smash)
- 2018 – "Luxe" by Hiroomi Tosaka ft. Crazyboy (RIAJ: Platinum as a part of the JSB album "FUTURE")
- 2018 – "Smile Moon Night" by Hiroomi Tosaka (RIAJ: Platinum as a part of the JSB album "FUTURE")
- 2018 – "End of Line" by Hiroomi Tosaka (RIAJ: Platinum as a part of the JSB album "FUTURE")
- 2018 – "Smile Moon Night" by Hiroomi Tosaka (RIAJ: Platinum as a part of the JSB album "FUTURE")
- 2018 – "Hey" by Hiroomi Tosaka ft. Afrojack (RIAJ: Platinum as a part of the JSB album "FUTURE")
- 2018 – "Till The Sun Comes Up" by Miss Montreal
- 2018 – "Own Game" by Afrojack & Chasner
- 2019 – "Red Lemonade" by Miss Montreal
- 2022 – "LOKO" by Christian Pagán from "American Song Contest" (Qualifier Winner, #6 iTunes Top 100 Latin Songs)

As executive producer

- 2022 – "LOKO" by Christian Pagán from "American Song Contest" (Qualifier Winner, #6 iTunes Top 100 Latin Songs)

== Production and co-production credits ==
- 2018 – "End of Line" by Hiroomi Tosaka (produced by FÄIS & Afrojack) (RIAJ: Platinum as a part of the JSB album "FUTURE")
- 2018 – "Till The Sun Comes Up" by Miss Montreal (produced by FÄIS & Gordon Groothedde)
- 2018 – "Make Me Do" by FÄIS (produced by Afrojack, Johannes Andersson, FÄIS)
- 2019 – "Red Lemonade" by Miss Montreal (produced by FÄIS & Gordon Groothedde)

== Discography ==
=== Singles ===
Title	Year	Peak chart positions						Certifications	Album
Title	Year	NLD 40	NLD 100	BE (FL)	BE (WA)	NOR	SWE	Certifications	Album
"Hey" (featuring Afrojack)	2016	2	7	— (Note: "Hey" did not enter the Flanders Ultratop 50, but did enter the Ultratip chart.)	76	32	12	NVPI: Platinum; GLF: Platinum	non-album singles
"Used to Have It All" (featuring Afrojack)	2016	18	55	— (Note: "Used to Have It All" did not enter the Flanders Ultratop 50, but did enter the Ultratip chart.)	—	—	—	NVPI: Platinum	non-album singles
"Ask Me Tomorrow"	2017	47	128	—	—	—	—	—	non-album singles
"Know You Better"	2018	8	26	— (Note: "Know You Better" did not enter the Flanders Ultratop 50, but did enter the Ultratip chart.)	95	—	—	NVPI: Platinum	non-album singles
"Make Me Do"	2018	27	—	—	—	—	—	—	non-album singles
"I Want You Now"	2019	—	—	—	—	—	—	—	
"Love You More"	2021	—	—	—	—	—	—	—	
"—" denotes a recording that did not chart or was not released in that territory.

== Appearances ==
=== Live shows ===
- Afrojack World Tour (2016)
- Tomorrowland (2016 and 2017)
- Tomorrowland Brasil (2016)
- Ultra Music Festival (2016 and 2017)
- First headlining show at Paradiso Noord (2018)

=== Award shows ===
- 538 JingleBall hosted by Radio 538 (2015)
- MTV Europe Music Awards hosted by MTV (2016)
- 538Live XXL hosted by Radio 538 (2016)
- 538 Kingsday (2017)
- 538 Kingsday (2018)
- 100% NL Awards (2018)

=== TV shows ===
- RTL Late Night (2016-2018)
- Holland's Next Top Model (2016)
- NOC*NSF Sportgala 2016 hosted by NOS (2016)
