= Larry Tee =

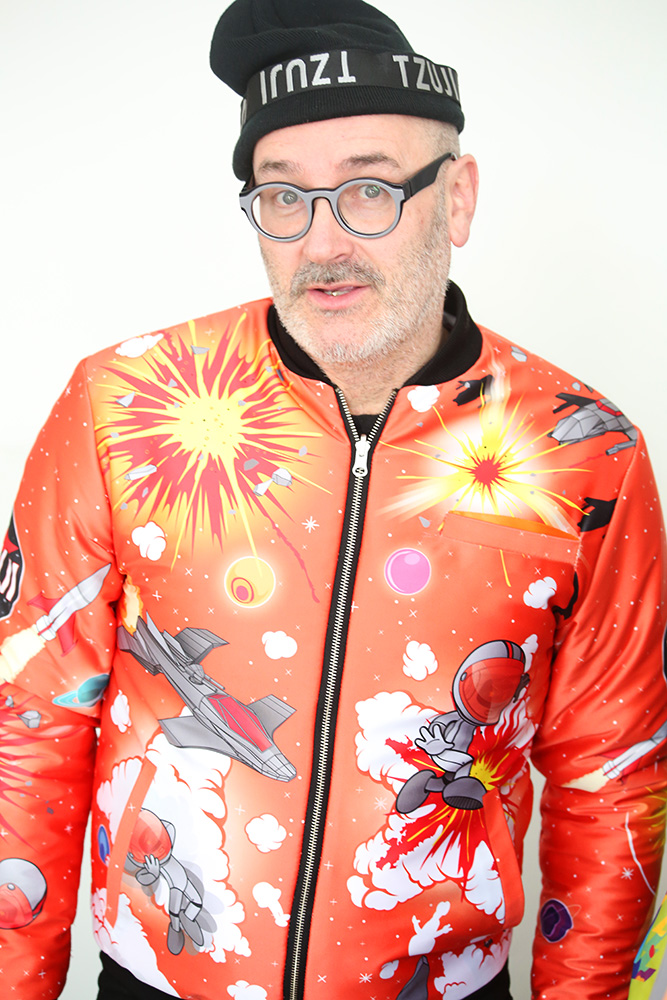
- Larry Tee dressed in TZUJI

Background information
- Born: Lawrence Thom; October 12, 1959 (age 66)
- Origin: Seattle, Washington, USA
- Genres: Electroclash, house, pop
- Occupations: DJ, club promoter, producer
- Years active: 1989–present
- Labels: Ultra, Djs Are Not Rockstars, Mogul Electro, Whacked, Universal

Larry Tee (born October 12, 1959) is an LA-based DJ, club promoter, and music producer who curated the electroclash scene in New York in the early 2000s, and helped launch the careers of such artists as RuPaul, Scissor Sisters, Fischerspooner, Peaches, W.I.T., and Avenue D. He has written songs for and collaborated with Afrojack, Shontelle, Princess Superstar, Santigold, RuPaul, Sean Garrett, Steve Aoki, and Amanda Lepore.

In January 2014, he launched his clothing line TZUJI at London Fashion Week. TZUJI has since been worn by popular stars like Jimmy Fallon on The Tonight Show, Rihanna, Missy Elliott, and Sean Kingston; and sold in top stores like the Dover Street Market in New York and VFILES as well as in Los Angeles, London, Berlin, and Melbourne.

New York Press credited Tee as "a hipster before there were hipsters, a club kid before Michael Alig dismembered one, and a man who made Williamsburg cool again". The New York Times cites Larry's club in Williamsburg as one of the reasons Williamsburg "got its groove back." New York magazine celebrated Tee's role in making RuPaul a star in the 1990s.

== Career ==
Tee was born to two Canadian-born citizens in Seattle, Washington. He grew up in Seattle and then Marietta, Georgia. In the early 1980s, he moved to Atlanta, where he became a part of the music scene and hung out with personalities such as RuPaul, Michael Stipe of R.E.M., Lady Bunny, and Lahoma Van Zandt at the Celebrity Club in Atlanta.

In 1986, Tee, along with RuPaul, Lady Bunny, and Lahoma Van Zandt, moved to New York City. Living with videographer Nelson Sullivan, Tee quickly became involved with the Club Kids scene with his epic party, Love Machine. He hosted nights at Michael Alig's infamous DISCO 2000, which is featured in the movie Party Monster (2003). He also DJed at the ROXY on a weekly basis.

During the 1990s, he became a prominent DJ by playing at highly regarded venues such as Palladium, the ROXY, and Twilo. In 1992, Tee co-wrote RuPaul's top 40-hit "Supermodel (You Better Work)".

In the early 2000s, while spinning at the Berliniamsburg party at the club Luxx, Tee trademarked the term "electroclash", which became so well known that it appeared in the Oxford Dictionary. He coordinated and managed the 2001 Electroclash Festival, which featured Scissor Sisters, Fischerspooner, and Peaches. He also created and managed the nouveau-music electro girl group W.I.T.

In 2007, he and Andy Bell released the single "Matthew", an homage to Matthew Shepard, who in 1998 was killed for being gay.

In 2009, Tee released the iTunes top 20 dance album Club Badd, featuring songs by Perez Hilton, Princess Superstar (the "Licky" single was later re-written by Sean Garrett of Beyoncé/Usher fame and re-recorded by Shontelle), Jeffree Star, Roxy Cottontail, Herve, Bart B More, and Christopher Just. "Licky" also appeared on the Steve Aoki mix album with Santogold rapping on it, and in the Russell Brand movie, "Get Him To the Greek". In 2010, Tee released the single "Let's Make Nasty" featuring Roxy Cottontail; it was re-released in the UK in 2011.

In 2010, Tee collaborated with celebrity blogger Perez Hilton and Amanda Lepore to produce Hilton's first music track. Tee has remixed artists including Sia, Iggy Azalea, Steve Aoki, R.E.M., Lady Gaga, Roisin Murphy, Kele of Bloc Party, and Cher.

In 2011, Tee moved to Shoreditch, London. He ran a weekly night in east London called Super Electric Party Machine at East Bloc every Friday Night, and XOYO, which has featured artists like Charli XCX, Brooke Candy, AME from Duke Dumonts #1 smash, Le1f, Ssion, and 2 Bears' Rolf.

In June 2015, Tee moved to Berlin to run TZUJI from Germany and run KRANK parties in Berlin. TZUJI has since been featured on shows such as The Tonight Show Starring Jimmy Fallon, X Factor, and similar shows in several countries. The brand is associated with such entertainers as Rhianna, Missy Elliott, and Sean Kingston, and is sold in such shops as La Petite Mort and the Dover Street Market in New York, V Files, Asos Marketplace, Flasher (on Melrose, in Los Angeles), Borderline Apparel (in London), and Chaos-Labs (in Berlin).

In 2020, Tee launched the Fashertainment Inc website for forthcoming reality TV project of the same name.

In 2023, Tee moved to Los Angeles with his partner, drag queen Morgan Wood. In 2024 he produced music with Love Bailey, DJ'd at Just Like Heaven Festival and appeared in a documentary about the Butthole Surfers.

In 2025, Tee wrote music for the reality competition show for drag kings, King of Drag, broadcast on Revry. His music was featured in the first episode where contestants had to write verses and perform in two boy bands.
