= Sunnery James & Ryan Marciano =

Dutch DJ and record producer duo

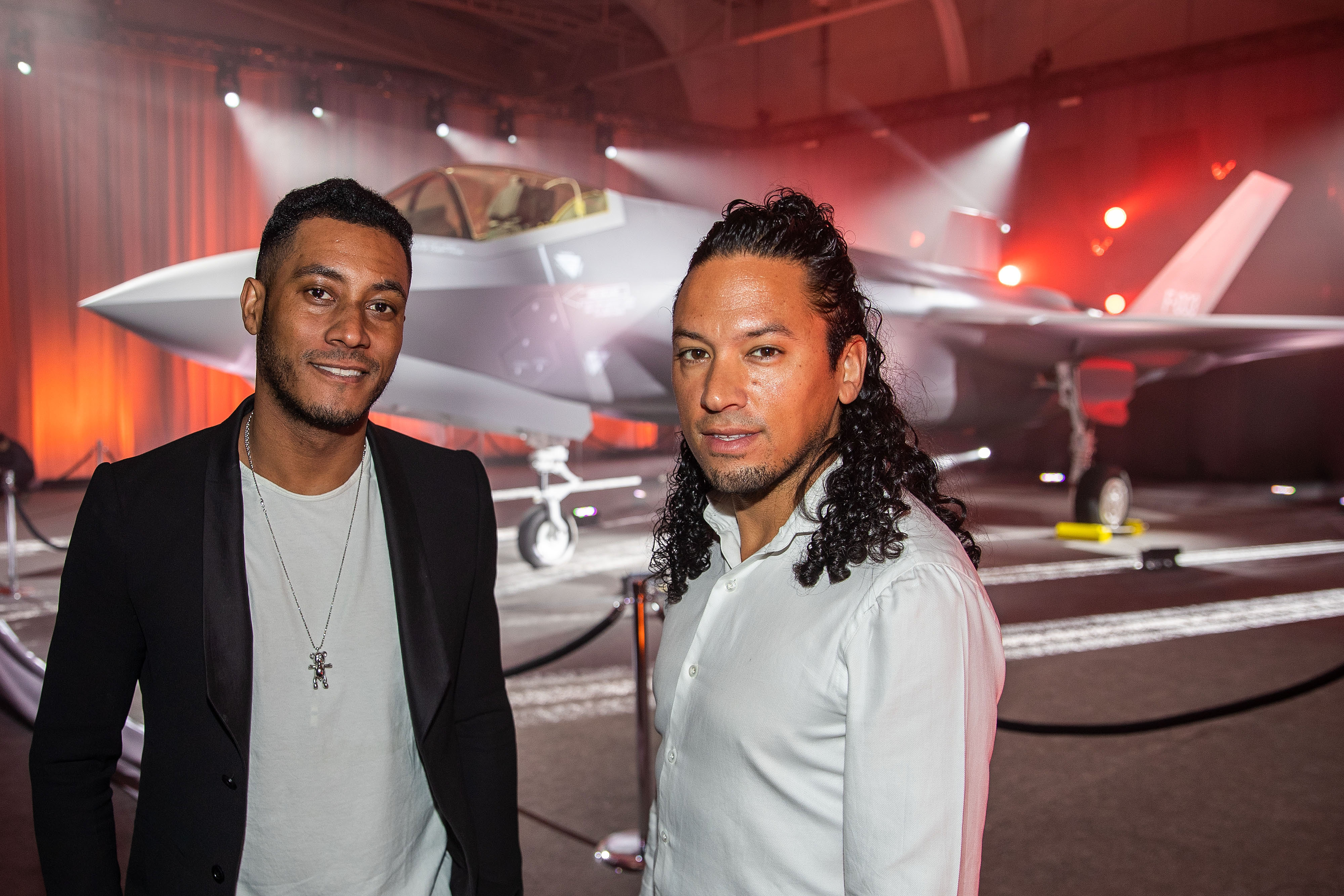
- James (left) and Marciano in 2019.

Background information
- Born: Sunnery Gorré; Ryan de Lange; * March 29, 1981 (age 45) (James): September 8, 1982 (age 43) (Marciano) London
- Origin: Amsterdam, Netherlands
- Genres: House; electro house
- Years active: 2009–present
- Labels: Spinnin'; Musical Freedom; Armada Music; SONO Music
- Members: Sunnery Jameston (Sunnery James); Ryan de Lange (Ryan Marciano)
- Website: sj-rm.com

Sunnery James & Ryan Marciano is a Dutch DJ and record production duo from Amsterdam, composed of Sunnery Gorré (Sunnery James) and Ryan de Lange (Ryan Marciano). They released "SOTU" in March 2013, collaboration with Nicky Romero, on the label of Steve Angello. The title was a success, ranking as high as #2 on the Beatport Top 100.

Soon after, the duo joined Spinnin' Records, where they signed many singles such as "Triton", "Salute", and more recently "Come Follow".

They have since joined the Armada Music family with their own imprint SONO Music. Their music has developed a distinct tribal style to it.

== Awards ==
- 2022 - Ranked 96th on DJ Mag Top 100

== Discography ==
=== Extended plays ===
- Affective (2018)
- Love, Dance and Feel (2019)
- Sunnery James & Ryan Marciano Present: The Tribe Vol. One (2020)

=== Charting singles ===
Year	Title	Peak chart positions		Album
Year	Title	NLD	BEL (Fl)	Album
2013	"Triton" (Dance Valley 2013 Anthem) (with DubVision)	—	—^{[A]}	Non-album singles
2014	"S.O.T.U." (with Nicky Romero featuring Fast Eddie)	—	—^{[B]}	Non-album singles
"—" denotes a recording that did not chart or was not released in that territory.

=== Other singles ===
Only singles and remixes released since October 2012 are listed below:

- 2011: Markuzza/Zweepstok [Size Records]
- 2011: Lethal Industry [Spinnin Records]
- 2012: Finally Here [Spinnin Records]
- 2013: Firefaces (Energy 2013 Anthem) (with Jaz von D) [Spinnin Records]
- 2013: Stiffness (with Chocolate Puma) [X]
- 2013: Ultronic [Spinnin Records]
- 2013: Triton (Dance Valley 2013 Anthem) (with DubVision) [Spinnin Records]
- 2013: S.O.T.U. (with Nicky Romero) [Size Records]
- 2014: Circus (with Ariyan) [Musical Freedom]
- 2014: One Life (featuring Miri Ben-Ari) [Doorn (Spinnin)]
- 2014: Salute [Spinnin Records]
- 2014: Red Moon [Doorn (Spinnin)]
- 2015: Come Follow (featuring KiFi) [Spinnin Records]
- 2015: Karusell (with Leroy Styles) [Spinnin Records]
- 2015: ABC (with Sander van Doorn) [Doorn Records (Spinnin)]
- 2015: Horny Bounce [Armada Trice]
- 2016: Don't Make Me Wait [Armada Music]
- 2016: Drums Of Tobago (with Eddie Thoneick) [Armada Music]
- 2017: The One That Got Away (featuring Clara Mae)[Sono Music]
- 2017: Avalanche (featuring Luciana) [Sono Music]
- 2017: Shorty [Sono Music]
- 2017: Nobody Told Me (featuring Kepler) [Sono Music]
- 2017: You Are (with Armin van Buuren) [Armada Music]
- 2017: La Vela (Prende La Vela) [Sono Music]
- 2018: I'll House You (vs. Thomas Newson) [Sono Music]
- 2018: Savages (with Bruno Martini featuring Mayra) [Sono Music]
- 2018: Badman (with Dyna) [Sono Music]
- 2018: 5 Minutes Away (featuring Bayku) [Armada Music]
- 2018: Thinking About You (featuring Blaq Tuxedo) [Sono Music]
- 2018: Worst Way (featuring Seann Bowe) [Sono Music]
- 2018: You Are Too (with Armin van Buuren) [Armada Music]
- 2018: Bombs Away (with Tom Staar) [Size Records]
- 2018: Born Again (Babylonia) (with Nicola Fasano & Adam Clay) [Armada Music]
- 2018: In My Mind (with Marc Volt) [Armada Music]
- 2019: Coffee Shop (featuring Kes Kross)
- 2019: Shameless (featuring Mayra) [Sono Music]
- 2019: Ruff (with Novak) [Sono Music]
- 2019: Love, Dance and Feel (with Leon Benesty) [Sono Music]
- 2019: In My Bones (with Dan McAlister) [Sono Music]
- 2019: Ponypack [Sono Music]
- 2019: Monster (with Magnificence) [Musical Freedom]
- 2020: Life After You (featuring Rani) [Sono Music]
- 2020: Devotion [Sono Music]
- 2020: What If (featuring Hannah Ellis) [Sono Music]
- 2021: Unseen Heroes [Sono Music]
- 2021: Better Things (with Ginge and OG) [Sono Music]
- 2022: See (with QG) [Sono Music]
- 2023: Keloke (with Gian Varela)

=== Remixes ===
- 2017: J Balvin and Willy William - Mi Gente (Sunnery James & Ryan Marciano Remix)
- 2018: Armin van Buuren featuring Conrad Sewell - Sex, Love & Water (Sunnery James & Ryan Marciano Remix)
- 2019: Jewelz & Sparks - "Bring It Back" (Afrojack and Sunnery James & Ryan Marciano Edit)
- 2019: Hardwell featuring Trevor Guthrie - "Summer Air" (Sunnery James & Ryan Marciano Remix)
- 2019: Loud Luxury and Bryan Vine - "I'm Not Alright" (Sunnery James & Ryan Marciano Remix)
- 2020: Sunnery James & Ryan Marciano and Yax.x featuring Sabri - "Pray" (VIP Mix)
