= D-Wayne =

Dutch DJ

D-wayne
- Born: Dwayne Megens; September 6, 1994 (age 32); Eindhoven, Netherlands
- Genres: Electro house; EDM; bass house; progressive house; Dutch house; tech house
- Occupations: Musician; DJ; record producer
- Instruments: Keyboards; piano; guitar
- Years active: 2009–present
- Labels: Spinnin' Records; Wall Recordings; Dim Mak Records; Future House Music; Smash The House
- Website: d-wayne.com

Dwayne Megens (born September 6, 1994), better known by his stage name D-wayne, is a Dutch house music DJ and record producer. He releases materials through Nervous specialized house label, Steve Aoki's Dim Mak label, Spinnin' Records and most recently on Wall Recordings, Afrojack's record label.

He released his single "Quantum" in 2013 and collaborated with Dutch DJ Afrojack in "Freedom" featuring Jack McManus. The track appeared on Afrojack's 2014 album Forget the World. Touring with, he has got an official 2015 residency with Drai's Nightclub in Las Vegas.

== Discography ==
=== Charting singles ===
Year	Title	Peak chart positions		Album
Year	Title	NLD	BEL (Fl)	Album
2010	"Flute Wave"	—	—^{[A]}	Non-album singles
2013	"Turn Your Lights On" (with Kid Vicious featuring Jan Dulles)	84	—	Non-album singles
2013	"Ammo"	—	—^{[B]}	Non-album singles
2014	"Freedom" (with Afrojack featuring Jack McManus)	—^{[C]}	—	Afrojack album Forget the World
"—" denotes a recording that did not chart or was not released in that territory.

=== Singles ===
- 2010: "Turn Your Lights On" (D-Wayne & Kid Vicious feat. Jan Dulles)
- 2010: "Turn Your Love Around" (feat. Dan'thony)
- 2010: "Modest"
- 2011: "Distance"
- 2011: "Identity"
- 2011: "Eponym" (D-Wayne vs Jacob van Hage)
- 2011: "Kampala"
- 2011: "PUNKd"
- 2012: "Cataclysm"
- 2012: "Neon"
- 2012: "Rewind"
- 2013: "Shatter" (Gabriel & Dresden vs D-Wayne)
- 2013: "Quantum"
- 2013: "AMMO"
- 2013: "Mirroar"
- 2013: "Gravity"
- 2013: "Project 6"
- 2014: "Crackle" (Yves V & D-Wayne)
- 2014: "Africa"
- 2014: "X-Ray Vision"
- 2014: "Freedom" (Afrojack & D-Wayne feat. Jack McManus)
- 2014: "Detonate" (D-Wayne & Leon Bolier)
- 2014: "Revel"
- 2014: "Ignition"
- 2015: "Modus"
- 2015: "Take U" (Alvaro & D-Wayne)
- 2015: "Never Had"
- 2016: "Back To Basics"
- 2016: "Alcohol" (Apster, D-Wayne & NLW)
- 2016: "Supreme"
- 2016: "Rage" (Regilio & D-Wayne)
- 2017: "Think Of Me" (D-Wayne & Robert Falcon)
- 2017 "Badman Sound" (D-Wayne feat. MC Ambush)
- 2017: "Drop It Low" (D-Wayne & Crossnaders)
- 2017: "Getaway" (D-Wayne & Bobby Rock)
- 2017: "Ghost"
- 2017: "Party Don't Stop"
- 2017: "Trippin'"
- 2018: "I Got You" (D-Wayne and Pnut & Jelly)

=== Remixes ===
- 2019: R3hab and Jocelyn Alice - "Radio Silence" (D-Wayne Remix)
