= Gone (Afrojack song) =

2016 song by Afrojack

Single by Afrojack featuring Ty Dolla Sign
- Released: 5 August 2016
- Genre: Hip hop; dance
- Length: 3:16
- Label: Wall Recordings
- Songwriters: Tyrone William Griffin Jr.; Marty James; Nick van de Wall

Afrojack singles chronology
"System" (2016)	"Gone" (2016)	"Used to Have It All" (2016)

Ty Dolla $ign singles chronology
"Bacon" (2016)	"Gone" (2016)	"Circles" (2016)

Music video
- "Gone" on YouTube

"Gone" is a song by Dutch DJ and music producer Afrojack featuring American singer Ty Dolla $ign. It was released on 5 August 2016.

== Music video ==
The music video was published on 6 October 2016. It involves Ty Dolla $ign talking to Afrojack on the phone about making a record and how Afrojack can't do it. Ty then goes to a party and socializes with the women in and around the pool.

== Charts ==
=== Weekly charts ===
Chart (2016)	Peak position
Belgium (Ultratip Bubbling Under Flanders)	4
Belgium (Ultratip Bubbling Under Wallonia)	4
US Hot Dance/Electronic Songs (Billboard)	17
US Rhythmic Airplay (Billboard)	33

=== Year-end charts ===
Chart (2016)	Position
US Hot Dance/Electronic Songs (Billboard)	57
