= Ten Feet Tall =

2014 song by Afrojack featuring Wrabel

Single by Afrojack featuring Wrabel

from the album Forget the World
- Released: 3 February 2014
- Recorded: 2013
- Genre: Progressive house; dance-pop
- Length: 3:53
- Label: Island
- Songwriters: Wrabel; Chris Braide
- Producer: Afrojack

Afrojack singles chronology
| "The Spark" (2013) | "Ten Feet Tall" (2014) | "Dynamite" (2014) |

Wrabel singles chronology
| "Ten Feet Tall" (2014) | "I Want You" (2015) |

Music video
- "Ten Feet Tall" on YouTube

"Ten Feet Tall" is a song performed by Dutch music producer and DJ Afrojack featuring vocals from American singer Wrabel, with "Ten Feet Tall" becoming Wrabel's first international chart hit. It was released on 3 February 2014 as the second single from Forget the World (2014).

== Track listing ==
- Digital download – single
1. "Ten Feet Tall" (featuring Wrabel) – 3:53
- Digital download – David Guetta remix
1. "Ten Feet Tall" (David Guetta remix) (featuring Wrabel) – 6:09

== Charts ==
=== Weekly charts ===
| Chart (2014) | Peak position |
|---|---|
| Australia (ARIA) | 57 |
| Australia Dance (ARIA) | 16 |
| Belgium (Ultratip Bubbling Under Flanders) | 57 |
| Belgium Dance Bubbling Under (Ultratop Flanders) | 3 |
| Belgium (Ultratip Bubbling Under Wallonia) | 29 |
| Belgium Dance (Ultratop Wallonia) | 29 |
| Czech Republic Airplay (ČNS IFPI) | 60 |
| France (SNEP) | 182 |
| Hungary (Dance Top 40) | 7 |
| Hungary (Rádiós Top 40) | 3 |
| Hungary (Single Top 40) | 5 |
| Ireland (IRMA) | 45 |
| Netherlands (Dutch Top 40) | 9 |
| Netherlands (Single Top 100) | 9 |
| Netherlands (Mega Dance Top 30) | 5 |
| Netherlands (Mega Top 50) | 12 |
| Poland (Dance Top 50) | 34 |
| Scotland Singles (OCC) | 10 |
| South Korea (Gaon International Chart) | 53 |
| UK Dance (OCC) | 6 |
| UK Singles (OCC) | 20 |
| US Billboard Hot 100 | 100 |
| US Hot Dance/Electronic Songs (Billboard) | 9 |
| US Dance Club Songs (Billboard) | 8 |
| US Pop Airplay (Billboard) | 22 |

=== Year-end charts ===
| Chart (2014) | Position |
|---|---|
| Hungary (Rádiós Top 40) | 24 |
| Hungary (Single Top 40) | 45 |
| Netherlands (Dutch Top 40) | 24 |
| Netherlands (Single Top 100) | 47 |
| US Hot Dance/Electronic Songs (Billboard) | 23 |
| Chart (2015) | Position |
| Hungary (Dance Top 40) | 16 |

== Certifications ==
| Region | Certification | Certified units/sales |
|---|---|---|
| Brazil (Pro-Música Brasil) | Gold | 30,000^{‡} |
| Netherlands (NVPI) | 2× Platinum | 40,000^{^} |
| United States (RIAA) | Gold | 500,000^{‡} |
^{^} Shipments figures based on certification alone.^{‡} Sales+streaming figures based on certification alone.

== Release history ==
Release dates and formats for "Ten Feet Tall"
| Region | Date | Format | Label(s) | Ref. |
|---|---|---|---|---|
| United States | 8 April 2014 | Mainstream airplay | Def Jam | |
