= Forget the World (Afrojack album) =

Studio album by Afrojack
- Released: 19 May 2014
- Genres: Electro house; progressive house; hip house
- Labels: Wall; PM:AM; Universal; Def Jam; Island
- Producers: Afrojack; DJ Buddha; Polow da Don; Chantal Kreviazuk; D-Wayne; Andrew Kierszenbaum; Tearce Kizzo; Leroy Styles; Jared Leto; Dan Grech-Marguerat

Afrojack chronology
It's a Matter Of... (2013)	Forget the World (2014)	NLW EP (2015)

Singles from Forget the World
- 1. "As Your Friend" Released: 13 February 2013; 2. "The Spark" Released: 11 October 2013; 3. "Ten Feet Tall" Released: 3 February 2014; 4. "Dynamite" Released: 17 April 2014

Forget the World is the debut studio album by Dutch music producer and DJ Afrojack. It was released on 16 May 2014. Afrojack said of the album title, "It's basically a message not just to my fans, but also to myself, to always remember to keep following your heart, keep following your path, and never try to let the things around you get you down."

== Singles ==
"As Your Friend" featuring Chris Brown was released on 13 February 2013. It reached number 21 on the UK Singles Chart. The song appears on the album as a bonus track on the deluxe version.

"The Spark" featuring Spree Wilson was released as the album's lead single on 11 October 2013. The song entered the UK Singles Chart at number 17.

"Ten Feet Tall" featuring Wrabel was released on 3 February 2014, as the album's second single. It was released in the UK on 18 May 2014, alongside the David Guetta remix 2 days after the album's release.

"Dynamite" featuring Snoop Dogg was released on 17 April 2014, as the album's third single.

== Reception ==
=== Critical reception ===
Professional ratings
Aggregate scores
Source	Rating
Metacritic	49/100
Review scores
Source	Rating
AllMusic	3/5 stars
The Guardian	1/5 stars
Paste	3.3/10
Rolling Stone	3/5 stars
USA Today	3/4 stars

At Rolling Stone, Christopher R. Weingarten rated the album three stars out of five, stating that "anything that's not glowing with Afrojack's trademark explosions and monster melodies... is a blown opportunity." David Jeffries of AllMusic rated the album three stars out of five, writing that "Forget the World plays more like a collection of 12"s than a well-tempered album." At USA Today, Elysa Gardner rated the album three stars out of four, saying that "these new tracks represent EDM at its most breezily accessible". Paul McInnes of The Guardian rated the album one star out of five, stating that the release has only "one truly poignant moment."

=== Commercial performance ===
In the United States, the album debuted at number 32 on the Billboard 200, with first-week sales of 8,000 copies. It also debuted at number two on Billboard's Dance/Electronic Albums chart.

== Track listing ==
Standard version
No.	Title	Writer(s)	Producer(s)	Length
1.	"Ten Feet Tall" (featuring Wrabel)	Stephen Wrabel; Chris Braide; Nick van de Wall	Afrojack	3:49
2.	"Illuminate" (with Matthew Koma)	van de Wall; Koma	Afrojack	4:37
3.	"Born to Run" (featuring Tyler Glenn)	van de Wall; Chantal Kreviazuk; Bobby Andonov; Sam Watters; Clarence Coffee, Jr.; Tim McEwan; Urales Vargas; Jamal Jones	Afrojack; Chantal Kreviazuk^{[a]}; DJ Buddha^{[a]}; Polow da Don^{[a]}	4:53
4.	"Freedom" (with D-Wayne featuring Jack McManus)	McManus; van de Wall; Dwayne Megens	Afrojack; D-Wayne	4:03
5.	"The Spark" (featuring Spree Wilson)	van de Wall; Joseph Young III; Mark Evan Maxwell	Afrojack	4:00
6.	"Dynamite" (featuring Snoop Dogg)	van de Wall; Calvin Broadus, Jr.; Vargas; Jones	Afrojack; DJ Buddha^{[a]}; Polow da Don^{[a]}	3:48
7.	"Too Wild" (featuring Wiz Khalifa and Devin Cruise)	van de Wall; Cameron Thomaz; Devin Montgomery; Vargas; Jones	Afrojack	3:53
8.	"Three Strikes" (featuring Jack McManus)	van de Wall; McManus	Afrojack	4:56
9.	"Catch Tomorrow" (featuring Sting)	van de Wall; Andy Sherman; Dorothy Sherman; Vargas; Bilal Hajji; Andrew Kierszenbaum; Paolo "Shirazi" Prudencio; Tiërce Person	Afrojack; Andrew Kierszenbaum^{[a]}; Tearce Kizzo^{[a]}	3:06
10.	"We'll Be Ok" (featuring Wrabel)	van de Wall; Wrabel; Oliver Goldstein; John Martin; Michel Zitron; Christian Walz; Josh Abraham	Afrojack	5:19
11.	"Mexico" (featuring Shirazi)	Paolo "Shirazi" Prudencio; Van der wall	Afrojack; DJ Buddha^{[a]}; Polow da Don^{[a]}	4:51
12.	"Keep Our Love Alive" (with Matthew Koma)	Nicholas Audino Twice as Nice; Lewis Hughes Twice as Nice; van de Wall; Koma; Vargas	Afrojack	4:12

Deluxe version additional tracks
No.	Title	Writer(s)	Producer(s)	Length
13.	"Faded"	van de Wall; Vargas; Jones	Afrojack; DJ Buddha^{[a]}; Polow da Don^{[a]}	3:08
14.	"As Your Friend" (featuring Chris Brown)	Chris Brown; van de Wall; Leroy Ghazi; Nadir Sakir; Vargas; Jones	Afrojack; Leroy Styles^{[a]}; DJ Buddha^{[a]}; Polow da Don^{[a]}	4:52
15.	"Do or Die" (remix vs. Thirty Seconds to Mars)	Jared Leto; van de Wall	Afrojack^{[b]}; Thirty Seconds to Mars^{[b]}	4:38
16.	"Sovereign Light Café" (Afrojack remix vs. Keane)	Tim Rice-Oxley; Tom Chaplin; Richard Hughes; Jesse Quin	Dan Grech-Marguerat; Afrojack^{[b]}	4:55

Notes

- ^{^[a]} signifies a co-producer
- ^{^[b]} signifies a remixer
- "Freedom" features a sample from "Hero" by Nas.

== Personnel ==
- Afrojack – primary artist, all instrumentation (drums, keyboards), all programming (drum, keyboard, MIDI), orchestral arrangements, arranger, engineer, mixing, producer, remixing, additional production
- DJ Buddha – executive producer, all programming (drum, keyboard, MIDI), arranger, engineer, mixing, co-producer
- Polow da Don – executive producer, all programming (drum, keyboard, MIDI), arranger, engineer, mixing, co-producer

Technical production

- Falco Borsboom – arranger, engineer
- Ruud Peeters – arranger, orchestral arrangements
- Ron Cuijpers – arranger
- Guido Dieteren – arranger
- Duncan Fuller – assistant (^)
- Dan Grech-Marguerat – engineer, mixing, mixing engineer (^)
- Randy Urbanski – engineer, mixing, vocal engineer
- Rob Mathes – engineer, vocal producer
- Jamie Siegel – engineer, vocal producer
- Tom Hough – engineer (^)
- Patrick Mühren – engineer (^)
- Paolo "Shirazi" Prudencio – singer, songwriter
- Jamie Schefman – engineer
- Jelle van der Voet – engineer
- D-Wayne – keyboard programming, MIDI programming
- Dave Kutch – mastering
- John Hanes – mixing engineer (^)
- Serban Ghenea – mixing (^)
- Dave Fridmann – programming (^)
- Matthew Koma – vocal engineer, vocal producer
- Greg Kurstin – vocal engineer, vocal producer
- Andrew Drucker – vocal engineer
- Jarett Holmes – vocal engineer
- Mark Evan Maxwell – vocal engineer
- Jesse Shatkin – vocal engineer
- Brian Springer – vocal engineer (^)
- Tim Pagnotta – vocal producer

Additional musicians

- Rob Zeguers – double bass
- Tim McEwan – guitar
- Dennis van Leeuwen – guitar
- Andrew Kierszenbaum – keyboards, piano
- Tearce Kizzo – keyboards, piano
- Guido Dieteren – orchestra leader
- Matthew Koma – vocals, guitar
- Wrabel – vocals, piano
- Paolo "Shirazi" Prudencio – background vocals, vocals
- Chris Brown – vocals
- Devin Cruise – vocals
- Tyler Glenn – vocals
- Jack McManus – vocals
- Snoop Dogg – vocals
- Spree Wilson – vocals
- Sting - vocals
- Wiz Khalifa – vocals
- Keane
  - Jesse Quin – backing vocals, bass, keyboards, percussion
  - Richard Hughes – backing vocals, drums, percussion
  - Tim Rice-Oxley – backing vocals, piano, percussion, keyboards
  - Tom Chaplin – lead vocals, keyboards

Guido's Orchestra

- Judith Groen – cello
- Marije de Jong – cello
- Nele Stuyck – cello
- Guido Rooyakkers – horn
- Cleo Simons – horn
- Lars Wachelder – horn
- Nadia al Hajjar – viola
- Anna Dushkina – viola
- Nadine Hilkens – viola
- Kim de Beer – violin
- Mariam Buzghulashvili – violin
- Ewelina Krysiak – violin
- Marta Lemanska – violin
- Annelieke Marselje – violin
- Marleen Matser – violin
- Julia Rusanovsky – violin
- Aleksandra Stadniczenko – violin
- Anne van Eck – violin

Other personnel

- Todd Russell – art direction, design
- Ryan Gillmor – digital editing
- Thomas Deelder – executive producer
- Hugo Langras – executive producer

(^) = deluxe version

Credits adapted from AllMusic.

== Charts ==
=== Weekly charts ===
Weekly chart performance for Forget the World
Chart (2014)	Peak position
Australian Albums (ARIA)	49
Austrian Albums (Ö3 Austria)	30
Belgian Albums (Ultratop Flanders)	34
Belgian Albums (Ultratop Wallonia)	64
Dutch Albums (Album Top 100)	4
French Albums (SNEP)	195
German Albums (Offizielle Top 100)	46
Italian Albums (FIMI)	51
Japanese Albums (Oricon)	26
Scottish Albums (Official Charts)	33
Spanish Albums (Promusicae)	96
Swiss Albums (Schweizer Hitparade)	21
UK Albums (Official Charts)	76
UK Dance Albums (Official Charts)	8
US Billboard 200	32
US Top Dance Albums (Billboard)	2
US Digital Albums (Billboard)	12

=== Year-end charts ===
Year-end chart performance for Forget the World
Chart (2014)	Position
Dutch Albums (Album Top 100)	66

== Certifications ==
Certifications for Forget the World
Region	Certification	Certified units/sales
Netherlands (NVPI)	Gold	25,000^{^}
^{^} Shipments figures based on certification alone.

== Release history ==
Release history and formats for Forget the World
Region	Date	Format(s)	Label	Ref.
Germany	16 May 2014	CD; digital download	PM:AM; Universal; Island; Def Jam	
France	19 May 2014	CD; digital download	PM:AM; Universal; Island; Def Jam	
Spain	19 May 2014	CD; digital download	PM:AM; Universal; Island; Def Jam	
United Kingdom	19 May 2014	CD; digital download	PM:AM; Universal; Island; Def Jam	
United States	19 May 2014	CD; digital download	PM:AM; Universal; Island; Def Jam	
Canada	20 May 2014	CD; digital download	PM:AM; Universal; Island; Def Jam	
Italy	20 May 2014	CD; digital download	PM:AM; Universal; Island; Def Jam	
