= As Your Friend =

Single by Afrojack featuring Chris Brown

from the album Forget the World
- Released: 13 February 2013
- Recorded: 2012
- Genre: Electro house; progressive house; dance-pop
- Length: 4:00
- Label: Wall Recordings
- Songwriter(s): Nick van de Wall; Chris Brown; Urales Vargas; Jamal Jones; Nadir Sakir
- Producer(s): Afrojack; Leroy Styles (co.); DJ Buddha (co.); Polow da Don (co.)

Afrojack singles chronology
"Rock the House" (2012)	"As Your Friend" (2013)	"The Spark" (2013)

Chris Brown singles chronology
"Ready" (2013)	"As Your Friend" (2013)	"Fine China" (2013)

Music video
- "As Your Friend" on YouTube

"As Your Friend" is a song by Dutch DJ Afrojack, featuring vocals by American singer Chris Brown. The song was released as a single via iTunes on 13 February 2013. It was written by Afrojack, Chris Brown, Nadir Sakir, DJ Buddha, and Polow da Don, and was produced by Afrojack with co-production by Leroy Styles, DJ Buddha and Polow da Don. "As Your Friend" is featured as a bonus track on the deluxe version of Afrojack's 2014 debut studio album Forget the World.

== Music video ==
On 22 March 2013, Afrojack uploaded a lyric video onto Vevo, while the official music video was released on 29 March. Chris Brown does not appear in the video.

The video features a lot of special effects, and features Afrojack with an eagle and many women dancing around him. Since its release, the video has gained over 32,600,000 views.

== Track listing ==
Digital download – single
No.	Title	Length
1.	"As Your Friend" (featuring Chris Brown)	4:00

Digital download – The Remixes
No.	Title	Length
1.	"As Your Friend" (Leroy Styles remix)	5:56
2.	"As Your Friend" (Sidney Samson remix)	5:07
3.	"As Your Friend" (Danny Howard remix)	5:22
4.	"As Your Friend" (Nause remix)	5:36
5.	"As Your Friend" (Bobby Burns remix)	5:58
6.	"As Your Friend" (D-Wayne remix)	5:53

== Chart performance ==
=== Weekly charts ===
Chart (2013–14)	Peak position
Belgium Dance (Ultratop Flanders)	35
Belgium (Ultratip Bubbling Under Flanders)	5
Belgium Dance (Ultratop Wallonia)	9
Belgium (Ultratip Bubbling Under Wallonia)	3
Czech Republic (Rádio – Top 100)	47
France (SNEP)	44
Germany (GfK)	67
Ireland (IRMA)	20
Netherlands (Dutch Top 40)	30
Netherlands (Single Top 100)	40
Scotland (OCC)	14
Slovakia (Rádio Top 100)	79
UK Singles (OCC)	21
UK Hip Hop/R&B (OCC)	3
US Billboard Hot 100	88
US Hot Dance/Electronic Songs (Billboard)	8
US Dance/Mix Show Airplay (Billboard)	7
US Dance Club Songs (Billboard)	1
US Pop Airplay (Billboard)	28
US Rhythmic (Billboard)	25

=== Year-end charts ===
Chart (2013)	Position
Netherlands (Dutch Top 40)	172
US Hot Dance/Electronic Songs (Billboard)	33
US Dance Club Songs (Billboard)	33

== Release history ==
Region	Date	Format	Label
United States	14 March 2013	Digital download – single	Wall Recordings; Def Jam Recordings; Island Records UK; PM:AM Recordings
United Kingdom	22 March 2013	Digital download – single	Wall Recordings; Def Jam Recordings; Island Records UK; PM:AM Recordings
United Kingdom	11 June 2013	Digital download – The Remixes	Wall Recordings; Def Jam Recordings; Island Records UK; PM:AM Recordings
United States	14 June 2013	Digital download – The Remixes	Wall Recordings; Def Jam Recordings; Island Records UK; PM:AM Recordings

== See also ==
- List of number-one dance singles of 2013 (U.S.)
