= DubVision =

Dutch DJ duo

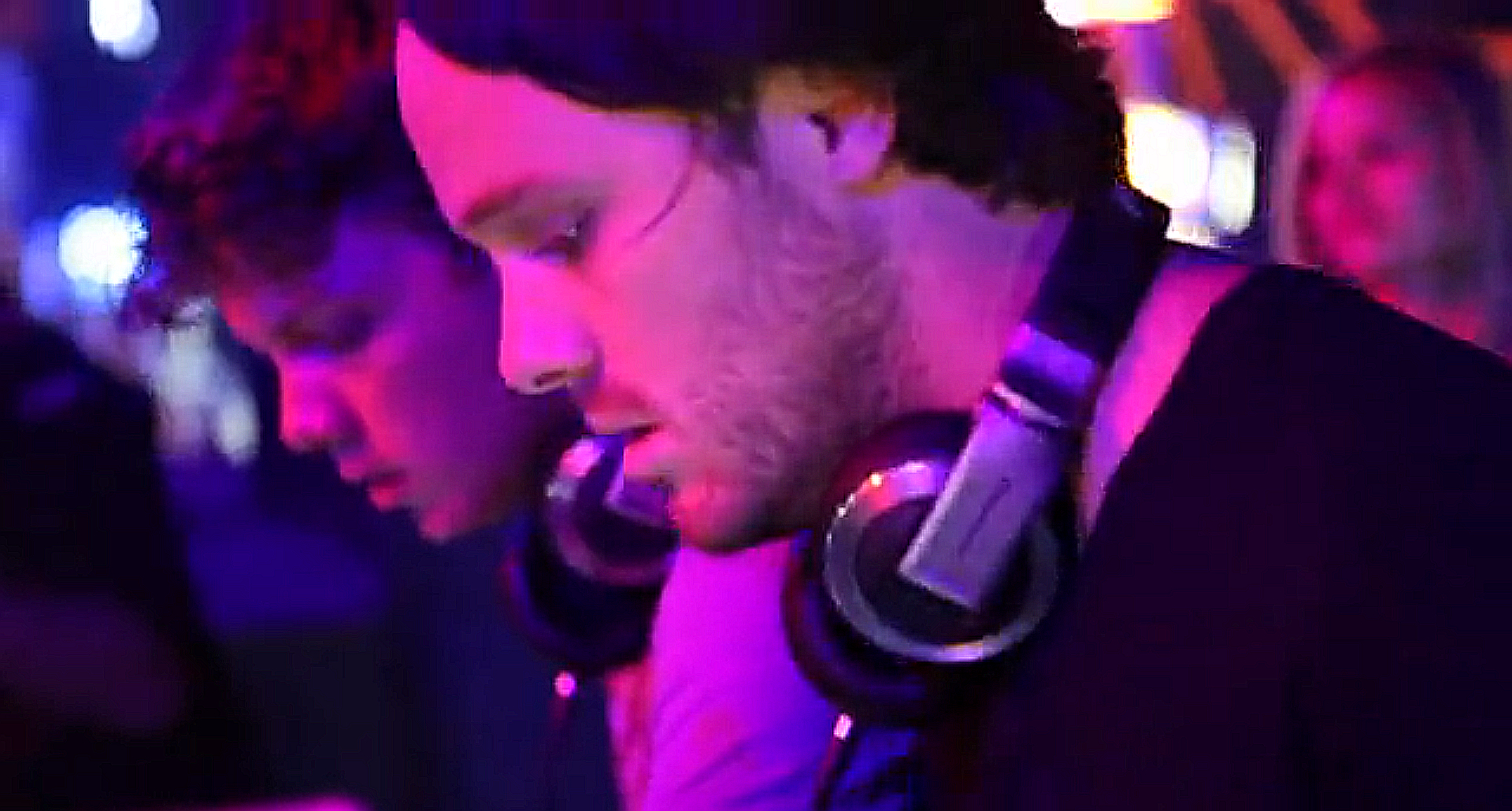
- DubVision in 2013

Background information
- Origin: The Hague, Netherlands
- Genres: Progressive house, electro house, future house, future rave
- Occupations: DJs, record producers
- Instruments: Ableton Live, synthesiser, turntable
- Years active: 2010–present
- Labels: Revealed, Spinnin' Records, Axtone Records, Armada Trice, Kid Coconut, Musical Freedom, Stmpd Rcrds
- Members: Victor Leicher
- Past members: Stephan Leicher
- Website: dubvisionmusic.com

DubVision is the artist name of Victor Leicher (born 1989), a Dutch DJ from The Hague. DubVision originally was a duo consisting of Victor and his brother Stephan Leicher (born 1981), who left after becoming a father in 2024. DubVision is signed to the labels Spinnin' Records, Armada Music, STMPD RCRDS and Axtone.

== Biography ==
Stephan and Victor's parents pressured the duo to learn to play an instrument during their childhood, so they learned to play the piano at age 7. They grew up in several countries, where they grew to appreciate musical influences from different cultures. At a later age, Victor began experimenting with electronic music, using different computer programs. After seeing his younger brother producing, Steve became interested, and the two decided to team up as a group.

In 2012, DubVision collaborated with Project 46 on the song "You & I", which they released on Spinnin' Records. That same year, they also made their debut on Axtone Records with their rendition of "Committed To Sparkle Motion" by Discopolis. They released "Redux" through Spinnin' to start off 2013, and, later that year, also made their debut on Doorn Records with their track "Into the Light", in which they collaborated with Sander van Doorn. In 2014, they released "Backlash" on Spinnin' Records, which marked their first Beatport #1 overall chart track. DubVision also performed at the 2014 edition of Tomorrowland for the first time in Belgium. They then remixed "Gold Skies" by Sander van Doorn and Martin Garrix for their next release on Spinnin' Records. They collaborated with Feenixpawl for "Destination", their sophomore track on Axtone, for their next release. For their final track of the year, they put out the single "Turn It Around," through Spinnin' Records as well.

In 2018, DubVision joined forces with Firebeatz to form the supergroup METAFO4R, debuting their collaboration at EDC Las Vegas. As a quartet, they released their first single, "Best Part Of Me," which was well-received by audiences. METAFO4R followed up in 2019 with the track "Rave Machine."

DubVision continued to gain recognition for their collaborative projects. In 2020, they worked with Alesso on the single "One Last Time." Their collaborations with Martin Garrix in 2022 produced tracks like "Starlight (Keep Me Afloat)" and "Oxygen," both featured on Garrix's album Sentio.

In July 2024 Dutch duo DubVision released their debut album Another World under STMPD RCRDS. Martin Garrix, Afrojack, Jem Cooke. and Shaun Farrugia appear on the album. The lead single from the album was "Home."

== Discography ==
=== Compilation albums ===
| Title | Details |
|---|---|
| Anthology | Released: 24 July 2015; Label: Plusquam; Format: Digital download, stream |
| Belgrado | Released: 12 January 2017; Label: Plusquam; Format: Digital download, stream |

=== Studio albums ===
| Title | Details |
|---|---|
| Another World | Released: 26 July 2024; Label: STMPD RCRDS; Format: Digital download, stream |

=== Extended plays ===
| Title | Details |
|---|---|
| Into White | Released: 3 June 2011; Label: Rococo; Format: Digital download, CD |

=== Singles ===
==== As lead artist ====
| Title | Year | Peak chart positions | | |
| Title | Year | NLD | BEL | US Airplay |
|---|---|---|---|---|
| "Tune It On" | 2011 | — | — | — |
| "All by Myself" | 2012 | — | — | — |
| "You & I" (with Project 46 featuring Donna Lewis) | 2012 | — | — | — |
| "Redux" | 2013 | — | — | — |
| "Into the Light" (with Sander van Doorn and Mako featuring Mariana Bell) | 2013 | — | — | — |
| "Triton (Dance Valley 2013 Anthem)" (with Sunnery James & Ryan Marciano) | 2013 | — | — | — |
| "Rifler" | 2013 | — | — | — |
| "Rockin" (with Firebeatz) | 2014 | — | — | — |
| "Hollow" | 2014 | — | — | — |
| "Backlash" (Martin Garrix Edit) | 2014 | — | — | — |
| "Destination" (with Feenixpawl) | 2014 | — | — | — |
| "Turn It Around" | 2014 | — | — | — |
| "Broken" | 2015 | — | — | — |
| "Vertigo" (featuring Ruby Prophet) | 2015 | — | — | — |
| "Invincible" (with Firebeatz featuring Ruby Prophet) | 2015 | — | — | — |
| "I Found Your Heart" (featuring Emeni) | 2015 | — | — | 29 |
| "Yesterday Is Gone" (with Dash Berlin featuring Jonny Rose) | 2015 | — | — | — |
| "Sweet Harmony" | 2016 | — | — | — |
| "Million Miles" (featuring Denny White) | 2016 | — | — | — |
| "Magnum" | 2016 | — | — | — |
| "Primer" | 2016 | — | — | — |
| "Under the Stars" (with Justin Oh) | 2016 | — | — | — |
| "Geht's Noch" | 2017 | — | — | — |
| "Satellites" | 2017 | — | — | — |
| "Fall Apart" | 2017 | — | — | — |
| "Something Real" (featuring Nevve) | 2017 | — | — | — |
| "Paradise" | 2017 | — | — | — |
| "New Memories" (with Afrojack) | 2017 | 124 | — (Note: "New Memories" didn't enter the Ultratop Flemish Singles top 50 chart, but peaked at no. 47 on the Flemish Dance Top 50 chart.) | — |
| "Keep My Light On" (with Raiden) | 2018 | — | — | — |
| "Steal The Moon" | 2018 | — | — | — |
| "Antares" | 2018 | — | — | — |
| "Yesterday" (with Raiden) | 2018 | — | — | — |
| "Are You Listening" (featuring Handed) | 2019 | — | — | — |
| "Enlighten Me" (with Syzz) | 2019 | — | — | — |
| "Rescue Me" (with Vigel featuring Nino Lucarelli) | 2019 | — | — | — |
| "Hope" | 2019 | — | — | — |
| "Back to Life" (with Afrojack) | 2019 | — | — | — |
| "Young Money" | 2019 | — | — | — |
| "Lambo" (with Firebeatz) | 2019 | — | — | — |
| "One Last Time" (with Alesso) | 2020 | — | — | — |
| "Into You" | 2020 | — | — | — |
| "Take My Mind" | 2020 | — | — | — |
| "Sign" | 2020 | — | — | — |
| "Like This" | 2020 | — | — | — |
| "Melody" (with Micar & Jash and Marmy) | 2020 | — | — | — |
| "Stand By You" (with Pontifexx) | 2020 | — | — | — |
| "I Wanna Be There" (with Anml Kngdm) | 2021 | — | — | — |
| "I Should Be Loving You" (with Armin van Buuren featuring You) | 2021 | — | — | — |
| "I Don't Wanna Know" | 2021 | — | — | — |
| "Anywhere with You" (with Afrojack and Lucas & Steve) | 2021 | 98 | — | — |
| "No More" | 2021 | — | — | — |
| "Sometimes" (with The Him) | 2022 | — | — | — |
| "Starlight (Keep Me Afloat)" (with Martin Garrix featuring Shaun Farrugia) | 2022 | — | — | — |
| "Oxygen" (with Martin Garrix featuring Jordan Grace) | 2022 | — | — | — |
| "Time After Time" (cover) (with Dash Berlin and Emma Hewitt) | 2022 | — | — | — |
| "P.R.O.G." | 2022 | — | — | — |
| "Feel My Love" (with Lucas & Steve featuring Joe Taylor) | 2022 | — | — | — |
| "Electricity" (with Otto Knows featuring Alex Aris) | 2022 | — | — | — |
| "Feels Like Home" (with Afrojack) | 2022 | — | — | — |
| "Stitch You Up" (with Robbie Rosen) | 2022 | — | — | — |
| "Stay A Little Longer" (with Nicky Romero featuring Phillip Strand) | 2022 | — | — | — |
| "P.R.O.G.2" | 2023 | — | — | — |
| "Fine Day" | 2023 | — | — | — |
| "Take Me To Another World" (with Jem Cooke) | 2023 | — | — | — |
| "The Horizon (With You)" (featuring Nu-La) | 2023 | — | — | — |
| "Out Of The Dark" (with Nu-La) | 2023 | — | — | — |
| "Can You Feel It" | 2023 | — | — | — |
| "Underwater" (with Afrojack) | 2024 | — | — | — |
| "Empty" (with Martin Garrix) | 2024 | — | — | 37 |
| "Wherever You Are" (with Martin Garrix) | 2024 | — | — | 40 |
| "I'll Be There" | 2024 | — | — | — |
"—" denotes a recording that did not chart or was not released.

==== As METAFO4R (with Firebeatz) ====
| Title | Year |
|---|---|
| "Best Part of Me" | 2018 |
| "Rave Machine" | 2019 |
| "Grollow" | 2020 |

Co Produced:

| Title | Year |
|---|---|
| "Wrangler" (DJ Junior) | 2020 |

=== Remixes ===
2010

- C-Jay and Shylock — "Watch Closely" (DubVision Remix)
- Jon Kong — "Elevate" (DubVision Remix)

2011

- Glitter — "Tageskarte" (DubVision Remix)
- Derek Howell — "Stride" (DubVision Remix)
- Hyline and Jaybeetrax — "Disturb" (DubVision Remix)
- Eddie Middle-Line — "Sunset Feel" (DubVision Remix)
- DJ BeCha — "Goodbye" (DubVision Remix)

2012

- Dark Matters (featuring Jess Morgan) — "The Real You" (DubVision Remix)
- Syke 'n' Sugarstarr and Jay Sebag — "Like That Sound" (DubVision Remix)
- Derek Howell — "Stride" (DubVision Remix)
- Pascal & Pearce (featuring Juliet Harding) — "Disco Sun" (DubVision Remix)
- Discopolis — "Falling (Committed To Sparkle Motion)" (DubVision Remix)

2013

- Royaal & Venuto — "Summertime" (DubVision Remix)

2014

- Icona Pop — "Just Another Night" (DubVision Remix)
- Dimitri Vegas & Like Mike — "Chattahoochee" (DubVision Remix)
- Foster the People — "Coming of Age" (DubVision Remix)
- Sander van Doorn, Martin Garrix and DVBBS — "Gold Skies" (DubVision Remix)

2015

- Dirty South (featuring Sam Martin) — "Unbreakable" (DubVision Remix)

2016

- Nervo (featuring Harrison Miya) — "Bulletproof" (DubVision Remix)
- Kris Menace and Life Like — "Discopolis" (DubVision Remix)
- Fais (featuring Afrojack) — "Hey" (DubVision Remix)
- The Chainsmokers (featuring Charlee) — "Inside Out" (DubVision Remix)
- Axwell & Ingrosso — "Thinking About You" (DubVision Remix)

2017

- Martin Garrix and Dua Lipa — "Scared to Be Lonely" (DubVision Remix)
- Armin van Buuren and Garibay (featuring Olaf Blackwood) — "I Need You" (DubVision Remix)
- Afrojack and David Guetta (featuring Ester Dean) — "Another Life" (DubVision Remix)

2018

- Martin Garrix (featuring Khalid) — "Ocean" (DubVision Remix)

2019

- Syzz and Taku-Hero — "Be My Love" (DubVision Remix)
- Hardwell (featuring Trevor Guthrie) — "Summer Air" (DubVision Remix)
- Martin Garrix featuring Bonn — "No Sleep" (Dubvision Remix)

2020

- Afrojack featuring Ally Brooke — "All Night" (DubVision Remix)
- Tritonal and Brooke Williams — "Someone To Love You" (DubVision Remix)
- Martin Garrix (featuring John Martin) — "Higher Ground" (DubVision Remix)
- GATTÜSO & Disco Killerz - I'll Be The One (DubVision Remix)

2021

- Andrew Rayel — "Silver Lining" (DubVision Remix)
- Afrojack and David Guetta — "Hero" (DubVision Remix)

2022

- Eir Aoi - "Heart" (DubVision Remix)
- Frank Walker, Two Feet - "Day by Day" (DubVision Remix)
- Martin Garrix & JVKE - "Hero" (DubVision Remix)
