= The Spark (Afrojack song) =

Single by Afrojack featuring Spree Wilson

from the album Forget the World
- Released: 11 October 2013
- Genre: Electro house; dance-pop
- Length: 4:03 (radio edit); 6:55 (club edit)
- Label: Wall Recordings; PM:AM; Universal; Island; Def Jam
- Songwriters: Nick van de Wall; Joseph Young III; Mark Maxwell
- Producer: Afrojack

Afrojack singles chronology
"As Your Friend" (2013)	"The Spark" (2013)	"Ten Feet Tall" (2014)

Spree Wilson singles chronology
"The Only One" (2013)	"The Spark" (2013)	"Ghostchild" (2015)

"The Spark" is a single by the Dutch DJ and record producer Afrojack, featuring vocals by American singer Spree Wilson. It was released on 11 October 2013, through Island Records, as the lead single from his debut studio album Forget the World (2014).

It was re-released in November and entered the UK singles chart at number 17. The song was also featured on the promos for the MTV EMA 2013 on 10 November. One of the locations in the video is Parisian Palace, by Nico Santucci.

== Music video ==
A music video to accompany the release of "The Spark" was first released on YouTube on 11 October 2013.

== Track listing ==
Digital download – single
No.	Title	Length
1.	"The Spark" (featuring Spree Wilson)	5:11

Digital download – EP
No.	Title	Length
1.	"The Spark" (Tiësto vs. Twoloud remix)	4:36
2.	"The Spark" (DubVision remix)	6:00
3.	"The Spark" (Michael Calfan remix)	6:02
4.	"The Spark" (Tetsuya Komuro remix)	4:04
5.	"The Spark" (Blasterjaxx remix)	5:22

== Charts ==
=== Weekly charts ===
Weekly chart performance
Chart (2013–14)	Peak position
Australia (ARIA)	37
Austria (Ö3 Austria Top 40)	39
Belgium (Ultratip Bubbling Under Flanders)	5
Belgium Dance (Ultratop Flanders)	16
Belgium (Ultratip Bubbling Under Wallonia)	4
Belgium Dance (Ultratop Wallonia)	17
Czech Republic Airplay (ČNS IFPI)	16
Denmark (Tracklisten)	37
Finland Airplay (Radiosoittolista)	13
Germany (GfK)	36
Netherlands (Dutch Top 40)	14
Netherlands (Single Top 100)	19
Poland Airplay (ZPAV)	9
Poland Dance (ZPAV)	44
Scottish Singles Sales (Official Charts)	10
Slovakia Airplay (ČNS IFPI)	59
Slovenia (SloTop50)	43
Switzerland (Schweizer Hitparade)	73
UK Singles (Official Charts)	17
UK Dance (Official Charts)	5
US Dance Club Songs (Billboard)	8
US Hot Dance/Electronic Songs (Billboard)	21

=== Year-end charts ===
Annual chart rankings
Chart (2013)	Position
Netherlands (Dutch Top 40)	77
Chart (2014)	Position
Netherlands (Dutch Top 40)	98
US Hot Dance/Electronic Songs (Billboard)	73

== Certifications ==
Region	Certification	Certified units/sales
Australia (ARIA)	Platinum	70,000^{‡}
Netherlands (NVPI)	2× Platinum	40,000^{^}
^{^} Shipments figures based on certification alone.^{‡} Sales+streaming figures based on certification alone.
