= Another Life (Afrojack and David Guetta song) =

Single by Afrojack and David Guetta featuring Ester Dean
- Released: 28 April 2017
- Recorded: 2017
- Genre: Future bass
- Length: 3:28
- Label: Wall
- Songwriter(s): Ester Dean; Faisal Ben Said; Nick van de Wall
- Producer(s): Nick van de Wall; David Guetta

Afrojack singles chronology
"Wave Your Flag" (2017)	"Another Life" (2017)	"No Tomorrow" (2017)

David Guetta singles chronology
"Light My Body Up" (2017)	"Another Life" (2017)	"2U" (2017)

Ester Dean singles chronology
"Crazy Youngsters" (2015)	"Another Life" (2017)

Music video
- "Another Life" on YouTube

"Another Life" is a song by Dutch DJ and record producer Afrojack and French DJ and record producer David Guetta, featuring American singer-songwriter Ester Dean. It was released on 28 April 2017 via Afrojack's label Wall Recordings.

== Background ==
The song was first teased by Afrojack on 23 April 2017 via Twitter, in which the single's release date and cover art was revealed.

== Music video ==
The music video was released alongside the single and directed by Sanghon Kim.

== Track listing ==
Digital download – Radio Mix
No.	Title	Length
1.	"Another Life" (featuring Ester Dean) (Radio Mix)	3:28

Digital download – The Remixes
No.	Title	Length
1.	"Another Life" (featuring Ester Dean) (The Him Remix)	3:13
2.	"Another Life" (featuring Ester Dean) (Regilio and Trilane Remix)	2:30

Digital download – The Remixes EP
No.	Title	Length
1.	"Another Life" (featuring Ester Dean) (Yellow Claw Remix (Explicit))	2:44
2.	"Another Life" (featuring Ester Dean) (The Him Remix)	3:13
3.	"Another Life" (featuring Ester Dean) (DubVision Remix)	3:11
4.	"Another Life" (featuring Ester Dean) (D.O.D Remix)	2:34
5.	"Another Life" (featuring Ester Dean) (Tom & Jame Remix)	3:18
6.	"Another Life" (featuring Ester Dean) (Regilio and Trilane Remix)	3:20

== Personnel ==
Adapted from Tidal.

- Afrojack – composition, production
- David Guetta – production
- Ester Dean – composition
- Faisal Ben Said – composition
- Jay Karama – drum programming
- Cassian Irvine – mastering engineering, mixing
- Elio Debets – mixing
- Adam Korbesmeyer – recording engineering

== Charts ==
=== Weekly charts ===
Chart (2017)	Peak position
Austria (Ö3 Austria Top 40)	73
Belgium (Ultratip Bubbling Under Wallonia)	34
Belgium Dance (Ultratop Flanders)	34
France (SNEP)	115
Netherlands (Dutch Top 40)	28
Netherlands (Mega Top 50)	32
Netherlands (Single Top 100)	64
Russia Airplay (Tophit)	97
Switzerland (Schweizer Hitparade)	65
US Hot Dance/Electronic Songs (Billboard)	35

=== Year-end charts ===
Chart (2017)	position
US Dance/Mix Show Airplay (Billboard)	38

== Release history ==
Region	Date	Format	Version	Label	Ref.
United States	28 April 2017	Digital download	Radio Mix	Wall	
Australia	5 May 2017	Contemporary hit radio	Original	Universal	
United States	7 July 2017	Digital download	The Remixes	Wall	
United States	28 July 2017	Digital download	The Remixes EP	Wall	
