= Louder than Words (David Guetta and Afrojack song) =

Promotional single by David Guetta and Afrojack featuring Niles Mason
- Released: 2 July 2010 (iTunes)
- Recorded: 2010
- Genre: EDM; electro house; big room house; dance-pop
- Length: 3:04 (radio edit)
- Label: Virgin; EMI
- Songwriter(s): David Guetta; Michael White; J. Armstrong; Afrojack; Terence Battle
- Producer(s): David Guetta; Afrojack

"Louder than Words" is a song recorded by French DJ David Guetta and Dutch DJ and music producer Afrojack featuring vocals from Niles Mason. It was released digitally on 2 July 2010 worldwide. It charted at number 35 in Austria and received more than 6 million views on YouTube.

== Track listing ==
Digital download
No.	Title	Length
1.	"Louder Than Words (Radio Edit)" (feat. Niles Mason)	3:04
2.	"Louder Than Words (Original Mix)" (feat. Niles Mason)	6:00
3.	"Louder Than Words (Album Edit)" (feat. Niles Mason)	4:18

== Chart performance ==
Chart (2010)	Peak position
Austria (Ö3 Austria Top 40)	35
Germany (GfK)	39

== Release history ==
Country	Release date	Format	Label
France	2 July 2010	Digital download	Virgin, EMI
