= Electroclash Festival =

Electronic music festival in New York (2001–2004)

- Genre: Electronic music, electroclash
- Locations: New York City, Europe
- Years active: 2001–2002
- Founders: Larry Tee

Electroclash is a genre of music that emerged at the end of the 1990s. In the US it came to media attention, when the Electroclash Festival was held from October 10 to 14, 2001 in Williamsburg, New York. The festival was founded by DJ Larry Tee, and held again in 2002 with subsequent live tours across the US and Europe in 2003 and then 2004. Other notable artists who performed at the festivals and subsequent tours include: Scissor Sisters, ADULT., Fischerspooner, Erol Alkan, Princess Superstar, Mignon, Miss Kittin & The Hacker, Mount Sims, Tiga, Johnathan Beebe "DJ John Soviet", DJ Simon and Spalding Rockwell. Boy George also made a guest appearance at the event. Also, Hungry Wives, led by Joseph Corcoran. Electroclash had also been successful in Germany before, but the hype is said to have been over by 2003.

== See also ==
- List of electronic music festivals
- Live electronic music
