= Afrojack =

Dutch DJ and record producer (born 1987)

- Afrojack in 2012
- Born: Nick Leonardus van de Wall; 9 September 1987 (age 39); Spijkenisse, South Holland, Netherlands
- Other names: NLW; Kapuchon
- Occupations: DJ; record producer; remixer
- Years active: 2007–present
- Spouse: Elettra Lamborghini (m. 2020)
- Relatives: Ferruccio Lamborghini II (brother-in-law)
- Awards: Full list
- Musical career
- Genres: House; minimal house; Dutch house; electro house; progressive house; big room house; future house; dance pop; trap; future bass; moombahton
- Labels: Wall; Armada; Island; Def Jam; Spinnin'; Revealed; LDH
- Website: afrojack.com

Nick Leonardus van de Wall (Note: In this Dutch name, the surname is van de Wall, not Wall.) (Dutch: [ˈnɪk leːjoːˈnɑrdʏs fɑn də ˈʋɑl]; (Note: In isolation, van is pronounced [vɑn].) born 9 September 1987), known professionally as Afrojack (stylized in all caps), is a Dutch DJ, record producer and remixer. In 2007, he founded the record label Wall Recordings; his debut album Forget the World was released in 2014. Afrojack regularly features as one of the ten best artists in the Top 100 DJs published by DJ Mag. He is also the CEO of LDH Europe.

== Early life ==
Nick Leonardus Van de Wall was born in Spijkenisse, South Holland, to a Dutch mother and a Surinamese father. He developed an interest in music at an early age and learned to play the piano at the age of five. From a single-parent household, his mother Debbie owned a local gym. After leaving school, Van de Wall studied graphic design at the Grafisch Lyceum in Rotterdam for a year before embarking on a career as a DJ/producer. At the age of 11, he started producing his own tracks from home for "five hours a day," and it took him a good seven years to produce his first release, "In Your Face."

== Musical career ==
At the age of 14, Van de Wall started DJing at local pubs and clubs and earning additional income by designing websites for fellow musicians. In 2007, he released "In Your Face", the first recording under the Afrojack name. He received international success with the song "Take Over Control" featuring Eva Simons, which charted in 10 countries. He took part in Episode 2 of 'Behind The Speedo', which is a comedy series by Redfoo.

His 2010 entry into the poll at number 19 was the highest new entry of that year's list. Afrojack was listed as number 7 on the DJ Mag Top 100 DJs of 2011. He ranked at number 9 on DJ Mag's Top 100 DJs of 2012. In 2013, he ranked at number 9 again.

In July 2010, Afrojack created an Essential Mix for BBC Radio 1. He released the Lost & Found EP on 22 December 2010. In 2011, he was featured on Pitbull's number 1 hit single "Give Me Everything" along with Ne-Yo and Nayer. He also contributed to the single "Run the World (Girls)" by Beyoncé. In January 2012 Afrojack received a European Border Breakers Award. Afrojack's newest single "The Spark" featuring Spree Wilson hit number 3 in Australia and New Zealand, and top 10 in over 7 more countries. In 2013, Afrojack was the 7th highest-earning DJ in the world, according to Forbes magazine.

In 2011, Afrojack co-produced music with many artists including David Guetta, Mike Brown and Madonna. In 2012, he was a headliner at a number of electronic dance music festivals, including Tomorrowland, Ultra Music Festival, and Coachella.

His debut album, Forget the World, was released on 19 May 2014 to mixed reviews.

On 17 March 2015, Afrojack was featured in David Guetta's single "Hey Mama" in which he co-produced with Guetta. The song featured him along with Nicki Minaj and Bebe Rexha. On 27 July 2017, he released the NLW EP under the alias NLW. This marked the launch of his new alias NLW under which he would go on to produce more underground style tracks.

In 2016, one of his songs, "Braver", was featured on the game Final Fantasy XV. He appeared in the 2016 documentary film about American DJ and producer Steve Aoki, titled I'll Sleep When I'm Dead, which was subsequently nominated for a Grammy Award.

On 28 April 2017, he released a new single "Another Life" collaborating with fellow DJ David Guetta featuring Ester Dean. On 7 September 2017, he released the single "No Tomorrow" featuring Belly, O.T. Genasis, and Ricky Breaker.

On 14 February 2018, he released his track "Bed of Roses" featuring Stanaj, which was played as an ID during his set at Ultra Music Festival 2017 in Miami. In July 2018, at Tomorrowland in Boom, Belgium, he debuted many of his new tracks such as "Bassride", "Step Back", which are all included in his Press Play EP, releasing on 31 August 2018.

In March 2020, Afrojack announced that he would perform at the Eurovision Song Contest 2020, in Rotterdam alongside Glennis Grace, however, the contest was cancelled due to the COVID-19 pandemic. He performed at the contest the following year, in the same city.

In March 2022, Afrojack released a new track along with David Guetta called "Trampoline." The song also features Missy Elliott, Bia and Doechii.

In September 2022, Afrojack announced "Jack to the Future" US tour. The tour includes fifteen cities.

=== Wall Recordings ===
Since 2007, Afrojack runs his own label, Wall Recordings, which represents producers including KIIDA, Apster, D-Wayne, D.O.D, Karim Mika, and others. The label used to operate as a sub-label to Spinnin' Records until late January 2016. Tom & Jame's Burn Down marked the last release of Wall Recordings as a sub-label. After going independent for a while, it became a sub-label to Armada Music in 2017, until it became independent again in 2019.

== Personal life ==
In 2019, Afrojack and Italian heiress, singer, socialite Elettra Lamborghini made their engagement public. The two were married on 26 September 2020 at Lake Como, Italy.

== Discography ==
- Forget the World (2014)

== Awards and nominations ==
=== Grammy Awards ===
Year	Category	Nominee / work	Result	Ref.
2011	Best Remixed Recording, Non-Classical	"Revolver (David Guetta's One Love Club Remix)"[with Dean Lewis]	Won	
2012	Best Remixed Recording, Non-Classical	"Collide (Afrojack Remix)"	Nominated	
2012	Best Rap Song	"Look at Me Now"	Nominated	
2021	Best Dance/Electronic Recording	"Hero"	Nominated	

=== MTV Europe Music Awards ===
Year	Category	Nominee / work	Result	Ref.
2011	Best Dutch Act	Afrojack	Nominated	
2012	Best Dutch Act	Afrojack	Won	
2012	Best European Act	Afrojack	Nominated	
2013	Best Electronic	Afrojack	Nominated	
2013	Best Dutch Act	Afrojack	Nominated	
2014	Best Electronic	Afrojack	Nominated	
2014	Best World Stage Performance	WS Live in Amsterdam 2013	Nominated	
2015	Best World Stage Performance	WS Live in Amsterdam 2015	Nominated	
2016	Best Electronic	Afrojack	Nominated	

=== DJ Magazine top 100 DJs ===
Year	Position	Notes	Ref.
2010	19	New Entry	
2011	7	Up 12	
2012	9	Down 2	
2013	9	No Change	
2014	12	Down 3	
2015	8	Up 4	
2016	10	Down 2	
2017	8	Up 2	
2018	8	No Change	
2019	9	Down 1	
2020	7	Up 2	
2021	6	Up 1	
2022	6	No Change	
2023	7	Down 1	
2024	7	No Change	
2025	8	Down 1	
2026	15	Down 7	
