= Dimitri Vegas & Like Mike discography =

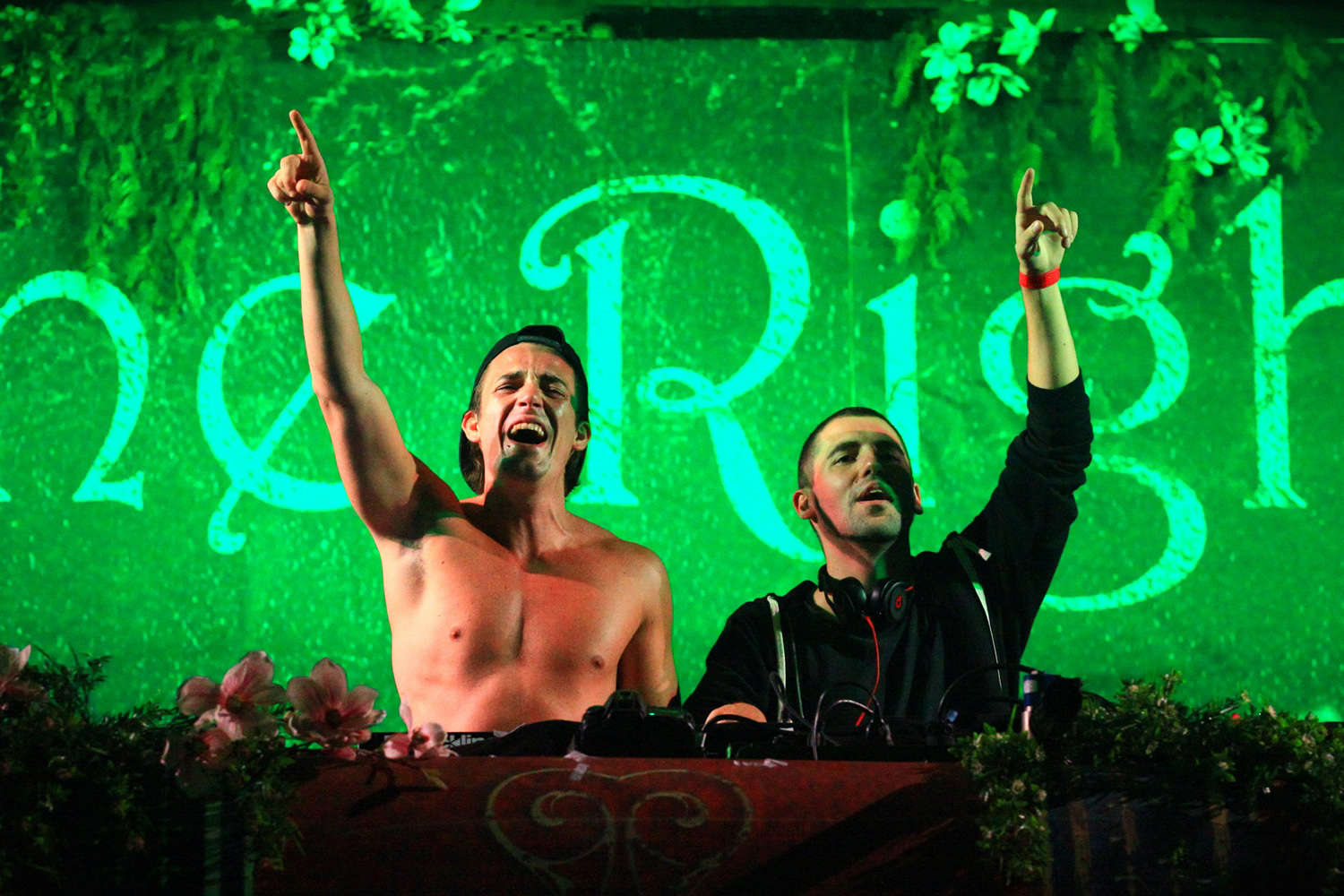
- Dimitri Vegas & Like Mike at TomorrowWorld 2013
- Compilation albums: 1
- Singles: 31
- Music videos: 27

Belgian DJ and record producer duo Dimitri Vegas & Like Mike released their first compilation album in 2014. "Mammoth" was their first single to chart in four countries. "Tremor" with Martin Garrix became their most successful single so far as it has charted in five countries, their only song to achieve this.

== Albums ==
=== Compilation albums ===
List of compilation albums
Title	Album details
Smash the House!	Released: February 2010; Label: DJ Magazine; Formats: CD
Tomorrowland Anthems – The Best Of	Released: 13 January 2016; Label: Avex Music Creative; Formats: CD, digital download

=== Soundtrack albums ===
List of soundtrack albums, with selected chart positions
Title	Album details	Peak chart positions	
Title	Album details	AUT	SWI
Bringing Home the Madness	Released: 6 December 2013; Label: CNR Music Belgium; Formats: CD, digital download	—	—
Bringing the World the Madness	Released: 12 December 2014; Label: CNR Music Belgium; Formats: CD, digital download	25	6
Asia Tour 2016 Edition	Released: 9 May 2016; Label: Love Da Records & ToCo Asia; Formats: CD, digital download	—	—
Bringing the Madness	Released: 16 December 2016; Label: Smash the House, Kontor; Formats: CD, digital download	—	—
"—" denotes a recording that did not chart or was not released in that territory.

== Extended plays ==
List of extended plays
Title	EP details	Peak chart positions
Title	EP details	BEL
Silence	Released: 27 February 2017; Label: Self-released; Format: Digital download	—
Tomorrowland 2018	Released: 29 July 2018; Label: Smash the House; Format: Digital download	—
Tomorrowland 2019	Released: 30 August 2019; Label: Smash the House; Format: Digital download	134
Garden of Madness 2020	Released: 15 May 2020; Label: Smash the House; Format: Digital download	—

== Singles ==
=== Charted singles ===
List of singles as lead artist, with selected chart positions and certifications, showing year released and album name
Title	Year	Peak chart positions								Certifications	Album
Title	Year	BEL	AUT	FRA	GER	NLD	SWI	UK	US Dance	Certifications	Album
"Liquid Skies" (as DNM featuring Jade)	2009	25	—	—	—	—	—	—	—		Non-album singles
"Under the Water"	2009	— (Note: "Under the Water" did not enter the Ultratop 50, but peaked at number 19 on the Ultratip chart.)	—	—	—	—	—	—	—		Non-album singles
"Tomorrow (Give in to the Night)" (Tomorrowland 2010 anthem) (with Dada Life and Tara McDonald)	2010	16	—	—	—	48	—	—	—		Non-album singles
"The Way We See the World" (Tomorrowland 2011 anthem) (with Afrojack & Nervo)	2011	34	—	—	—	—	—	—	—		Non-album singles
"Tomorrow Changed Today" (Tomorrowland 2012 anthem) (with The WAV.s featuring Kelis)	2012	20	—	—	—	—	—	—	—		Non-album singles
"Momentum" (with Regi)	2012	7	—	—	—	—	—	—	—		Non-album singles
"Madness" (with Coone featuring Lil Jon)	2013	35	—	—	—	—	—	—	—		Non-album singles
"Wakanda"	2013	27	—	—	—	—	—	—	—		Non-album singles
"Mammoth" (with Moguai)	2013	44	—	193	90	89	—	—	—	BEA: Gold	Non-album singles
"Chattahoochee" (Tomorrowland 2013 anthem)	2013	2	—	—	—	—	—	—	—		Non-album singles
"Project T" (vs. Sander van Doorn)	2013	29	39	—	33	—	21	—	—		Non-album singles
"Find Tomorrow (Ocarina)" (featuring Wolfpack and Katy B)	2013	2	—	—	—	—	—	—	—	BEA: Gold	Non-album singles
"G.I.P.S.Y." (featuring Boostedkids)	2013	19	—	—	—	—	—	—	—		Non-album singles
"Stampede" (vs. DVBBS and Borgeous)	2013	30	—	129	—	—	—	—	—		We Were Young
"Tremor" (Sensation 2014 anthem) (with Martin Garrix)	2014	3	55	116	—	44	—	30	—		Gold Skies
"Eparrei" (with Diplo and Fatboy Slim featuring Bonde do Rolê and Pin)	2014	5	—	—	—	—	—	—	—		Fatboy Slim Presents Bem Brasil
"Waves" (Tomorrowland 2014 anthem) (vs. W&W)	2014	7	—	—	—	—	—	—	—		Non-album singles
"Body Talk (Mammoth)" (with Moguai featuring Julian Perretta)	2014	2	—	106	—	—	—	—	—	BEA: Gold	Non-album singles
"Nova" (vs. Tujamo and Felguk)	2014	2	—	—	—	—	—	—	—		Non-album singles
"Tales of Tomorrow" (vs. Fedde le Grand featuring Julian Perretta)	2015	2	64	—	—	—	—	—	—		Non-album singles
"Louder" (with VINAI)	2015	42	—	—	—	—	—	—	—		Non-album singles
"The Hum" (vs. Ummet Ozcan)	2015	1	—	60	—	—	—	—	—	BEA: Platinum	Non-album singles
"Higher Place" (featuring Ne-Yo)	2015	1	—	131	—	—	—	—	1	BEA: Platinum	Non-album singles
"Arcade" (vs. W&W)	2016	37	—	97	—	—	—	—	—		Non-album singles
"Melody" (with Steve Aoki vs. Ummet Ozcan)	2016	12	—	—	—	—	—	—	—		Non-album singles
"Stay a While"	2016	3	—	—	—	—	—	—	—		Non-album singles
"Hey Baby" (vs. Diplo featuring Deb's Daughter; Remix with Kid Ink)	2016	1	—	—	65	—	—	—	1	BEA: Platinum	Non-album singles
"He's a Pirate" (with Hans Zimmer)	2017	35	—	—	—	—	—	—	—		Pirates of the Caribbean: Dead Men Tell No Tales
"Ready for Action"	2017	— (Note: "Ready for Action" did not enter the Ultratop 50, but peaked at number 4 on the Ultratip chart.)	—	—	—	—	—	—	—		Non-album singles
"Complicated" (with David Guetta featuring Kiiara)	2017	4	51	—	77	53	37	—	1	BEA: Platinum; NVPI: Platinum	Non-album singles
"Crowd Control" (vs. W&W)	2017	37	—	—	—	—	—	—	—		Non-album singles
"Slow Down" (with Quintino featuring Boef, Ronnie Flex, Ali B and I Am Aisha)	2018	14	—	—	—	2	—	—	—	BEA: Gold; NVPI: Platinum	Non-album singles
"Patser Bounce" (with Quintino)	2018	— (Note: "Patser Bounce" did not enter the Ultratop 50, but peaked at number 32 on the Ultratip chart.)	—	—	—	—	—	—	—		Non-album singles
"The House of House" (with Vini Vici and Cherrymoon Trax)	2018	— (Note: "The House of House" did not enter the Ultratop 50, but peaked at number 30 on the Ultratip chart.)	—	—	—	—	—	—	—		Non-album singles
"All I Need" (featuring Gucci Mane)	2018	18	—	—	—	—	—	—	—		Non-album singles
"When I Grow Up" (featuring Wiz Khalifa)	2018	9	—	—	—	—	—	—	—	BEA: Gold	Non-album singles
"Repeat After Me" (with Armin van Buuren and W&W)	2019	— (Note: "Repeat After Me" did not enter the Ultratop 50, but peaked at number 39 on the Ultratip chart.)	—	—	—	—	—	—	—		Non-album singles
"Daar gaat ze (Nooit verdiend)" (with Frenna)	2019	32	—	—	—	12	—	—	—		Francis (Deluxe)
"Selfish" (with Era Istrefi)	2019	29	—	—	—	—	—	—	1		Non-album singles
"B.F.A. (Best Friend's Ass)" (with Paris Hilton)	2019	— (Note: "B.F.A. (Best Friend's Ass)" did not enter the Ultratop 50, but peaked at number 25 on the Ultratip chart.)	—	—	—	—	—	—	—		Non-album singles
"Instagram" (with David Guetta and Afro Bros featuring Natti Natasha and Daddy Yankee)	2019	7	42	105	29	6	53	—	—	BEA: 2× Platinum	Non-album singles
"Boomshakalaka" (with Afro Bros and Sebastián Yatra featuring Camilo and Emilia)	2019	— (Note: "Boomshakalaka" did not enter the Ultratop 50, but peaked at number one on the Ultratip chart.)	—	—	—	—	—	—	—		Non-album singles
"The Anthem (Der Alte)" (with Timmy Trumpet)	2020	— (Note: "The Anthem (Der Alte)" did not enter the Ultratop 50, but peaked at number 42 on the Ultratip chart.)	—	—	—	—	—	—	—		Non-album singles
"Say My Name" (vs. Regard)	2020	27	—	—	—	—	—	—	—		Non-album singles
"Christmas Time" (with Armin van Buuren and Brennan Heart featuring Jeremy Oceans)	2020	32	—	—	—	—	—	—	—		Non-album singles
"We'll Be Dancing Soon" (with Azteck and Angemi)	2021	— (Note: "We'll Be Dancing Soon" did not enter the Ultratop 50, but peaked at number 25 on the Ultratip chart.)	—	—	—	—	—	—	—		Non-album singles
"Mexico" (with Ne-Yo and Danna Paola)	2023	46	—	—	—	—	—	—	—		Non-album singles
"Leader"	2023	—	—	—	—	—	—	—	—		Non-album singles
"She Knows" (with David Guetta, Akon, and Afro Bros)	2023	15	—	—	—	15	—	—	—		Rewind + Repeat
"Thank You (Not So Bad)" (with Dido, Tiësto, W&W)	2023	28	14	130	16	14	14	68	—	BPI: Gold	Non-album singles
"To the Beat" (with Regard, Natti Natasha and Sash!)	2024	35	—	—	—	—	—	—	—		Non-album singles
"Come On" (with Nmixx)	2024	—	—	—	—	—	—	—	—		Non-album singles
"Makina Time" (with Marlon Hoffstadt and DJ Konik)	2026	—	—	—	72	—	82	—	—		Non-album singles
"—" denotes a recording that did not chart or was not released in that territory.

=== Non-charted singles ===
Title	Year	Album
"Hello Hello" (featuring MoDiD)	2009	Non-album singles
"Control" (as DNM with diMaro)	2009	Non-album singles
"Drop That" (with Albin Myers)	2010	Non-album singles
"Deeper Love" (featuring VanGosh)	2010	Non-album singles
"Pump Up the Jam 2010" (with Technotronic)	2010	Non-album singles
"Salinas"	2010	Non-album singles
"The Underdog" (featuring Andy Taylor)	2010	Non-album singles
"Dope Demand"	2010	Non-album singles
"Madagascar" (with Yves V & Angger Dimas)	2011	Non-album singles
"Generation X"	2011	Bringing the World the Madness
"Rej"	2011	Awesome EDM Vol. 1
"Dream Together" (Tomorrowland 2012 Anthem) (featuring Eva Simons)	2012	Non-album singles
"Loops and Tings" (with Yves V)	2012	Awesome EDM Vol. 1
"Phat Brahms" (vs. Steve Aoki and Angger Dimas)	2012	Bringing Home the Madness
"Turn It Up" (with GTA and Wolfpack)	2013	Bringing Home the Madness
"More" (with Laidback Luke)	2013	Bringing Home the Madness
"Ocarina" (with Wolfpack)	2013	Bringing Home the Madness
"Check This Out" (vs. Born Loud)	2014	Non-album singles
"Feedback" (vs. Steve Aoki and Autoerotique)	2014	Non-album singles
"Hands Up (Van Gogh)" (vs. Afrojack)	2016	Summer of Madness
"Million" (with Brennan Heart)	2016	Summer of Madness
"The Island"	2016	Summer of Madness
"Roads" (with Deniz Koyu)	2016	Summer of Madness
"Meet Her at Tomorrowland" (featuring Da Hool)	2016	Summer of Madness
"Jaguar" (with Ummet Ozcan)	2016	Summer of Madness
"Leaves"	2016	Summer of Madness
"Insanity" (with Blasterjaxx)	2016	Summer of Madness
"Unity" (with Hardwell)	2018	Tomorrowland 2018 EP
"Untz Untz" (with Vini Vici and Liquid Soul)	2019	Non-album single
"Turn Up" (with John Christian)	2019	Tomorrowland 2019 EP
"K20" (with Angemi)	2019	Non-album single
"Boing" (with Quintino and Mad M.A.C.)	2019	Tomorrowland 2019 EP
"Mortal Kombat (Anthem)" (with Bassjackers and 2WEI)	2019	Tomorrowland 2019 EP
"Everybody Clap" (with Nicky Romero)	2019	Tomorrowland 2019 EP
"The Flight" (with Bassjackers and D'Angello & Francis)	2019	Non-album singles
"Beast (All As One)" (with Ummet Ozcan and Brennan Heart)	2019	Non-album singles
"The Chase" (with Quintino)	2020	Non-album singles
"Happy Together" (with Bassjackers)	2020	Non-album singles
"Clap Your Hands" (with W&W and Fedde Le Grand)	2020	Non-album singles
"Get In Trouble (So What)" (with Vini Vici)	2020	Non-album singles
"Do It!" (with Kim Loaiza and Azteck)	2020	Non-album singles
"Bonzai Channel One" (with Bassjackers and Crossnaders)	2020	Non-album singles
"Christmas Time" (with Armin van Buuren and Brennan Heart featuring Jeremy Oceans)	2020	Home Alone Christmas EP
"Back to the Oldskool" (with Quintino)	2021	Non-album singles
"Too Much" (with Dvbbs and Roy Woods)	2021	Non-album singles
"We Love Hardcore" (with Scooter)	2021	God Save the Rave
"Heard About Me" (with Felix Jaehn and Nea)	2021	Breathe
"Rampage"	2021	Non-album singles
"Feel Your Love" (with Timmy Trumpet and Edward Maya)	2021	Non-album singles
"Reunion" (with Kshmr and Alok)	2021	Non-album singles

=== Dimitri Vegas solo singles ===
2021

- "Pull Me Closer" [House of House]

2022

- "The Drop" (with David Guetta, Nicole Scherzinger and Azteck) [Smash the House]

==== 2023 ====
- "Friends" with Steve Aoki & Chapter & Verse

==== 2024 ====
- "Good For You" with Goodboys & Chapter & Verse

==== 2025 ====
- "Pum Pum" with David Guetta & Loreen

=== Like Mike solo singles ===
2010

- "Es Vedra" [Spinnin' Records]

2018

- "Memories" [Smash The House] (Note: Like Mike's first solo release, independent of Dimitri Vegas.)
- "Rewind" [Smash The House]
- "Back 2 U" [Smash The House]

2019

- "Paralyzed" (featuring Ricky Hil) [Self-released]
- "A.M." [Self-released]
- "Best Friend" (featuring Bhavi) [Self-released]
- "Lies" [self-released]
- "Stuck In The Melody" [Self-released]
- "Sinner" [Self-released]

2020

- "High Off Love" (featuring Angemi) [Green Room]
- "Put Your Lips" [Green Room]
- "Pineapple" [Poporis Dimitrios]
- "I Lose Me" (featuring Layton Greene) [Green Room]
- "Best for You" [Green Room]

2021

- "We Come One" (with Angemi) [Smash The House]

2022

- "Desire" [Smash The House]
- "Speed Of Light" [AFTR:HRS]
- "Feel You Close" [Tomorrowland Music]
- "Awaking" [Smash The House]

==== 2023 ====
- ''Esperanza'' [MoBlack]
- "Dance for Me" [Green Room]

=== as 3 Are Legend (with Steve Aoki) ===
2019

- "Khaleesi" (with W&W) [Ultra Music]

2020

- "Raver Dome" (with Justin Prime and Sandro Silva)
- "Deck the Halls" (with Toneshifterz, Brennan Heart and Timmy Trumpet)

==== 2022 ====
- ''Pump It Up'' [Smash The House]

==== 2023 ====
- ''Name of Your DJ'' [Smash The House]
- ''Nasty'' [Smash The House]

== Remixes ==
Year	Title	Original artists	Ref.
2008	"Work That Body" (Dimitri Vegas & Like Mike Remix)	Dave Lambert & Housetrap	
2008	"Universal Nation" (Dimitri Vegas & Like Mike Remix)	Push	
2008	"Acid" (Dimitri Vegas & Like Mike Remix)	David Tort	
2009	"Leave the World Behind" (Dimitri Vegas & Like Mike vs. SHM Dark Forest Remix)	Swedish House Mafia & Laidback Luke (featuring Deborah Cox)	
2009	"Times Like These" (Dimitri Vegas & Like Mike Remix)	Albin Myers	
2009	"Groove On" (Dimitri Vegas & Like Mike Remix)	Timati (featuring Snoop Dogg)	
2009	"Loaded Gun" (Dimitri Vegas & Like Mike Remix)	Regi and Tyler	
2009	"Something Phat" (Dimitri Vegas & Like Mike Remix)	Pedro Mercado & Karada	
2009	"The Music and Me" (Dimitri Vegas & Like Mike Remix)	Lissat & Voltaxx (featuring Betty Bizarre)	
2009	"Dubai" (Dimitri Vegas & Like Mike Remix)	Philip Jensen	
2010	"Love Inside" (Dimitri Vegas & Like Mike Remix)	John Dahlback (featuring Andy P)	
2010	"Fire Wire" (Dimitri Vegas & Like Mike Remix)	Cosmic Gate	
2010	"Who Knows" (Dimitri Vegas & Like Mike Remix)	Spencer & Hill	
2010	"Take It Off" (Dimitri Vegas & Like Mike Remix)	Regi and Kaya Jones	
2010	"Satisfaction" (Dimitri Vegas & Like Mike Remix)	Benny Benassi	
2010	"Alcoholic" (Dimitri Vegas & Like Mike Remix)	Tim Berg	
2010	"Love Vibrations" (Dimitri Vegas & Like Mike Remix)	Dada Life	
2010	"Tik Tok" (Dimitri Vegas & Like Mike Remix)	Bob Sinclar (featuring Sean Paul)	
2010	"Side by Side" (Dimitri Vegas & Like Mike Remix)	Provenzano (featuring Andy P)	
2010	"Work This Pussy" (Dimitri Vegas & Like Mike Remix)	Dani L. Mebius and Billy The Kit	
2010	"Look Into Your Heart" (Dimitri Vegas & Like Mike Remix)	Max Vangeli (featuring Max C)	
2010	"Your Fire" (Dimitri Vegas & Like Mike Remix)	Basto	
2010	"You're No Good for Me" (Dimitri Vegas & Like Mike Remix)	Super Beez	
2011	"One Look" (Axwell vs. Dimitri Vegas & Like Mike Remix)	David Tort (featuring Gosha)	
2011	"Champagne Showers" (Dimitri Vegas & Like Mike Remix)	LMFAO	
2011	"Marry the Night" (Dimitri Vegas & Like Mike Remix)	Lady Gaga	
2011	"Jägerbomb" (Dimitri Vegas & Like Mike Remix)	Riley & Durrant	
2012	"Shed My Skin" (Dimitri Vegas & Like Mike vs. Yves V Remix)	D*Note	
2013	"Watch Out for This (Bumaye)" (Dimitri Vegas & Like Mike Tomorrowland Remix)	Major Lazer (featuring Busy Signal, The Flexican and FS Green)	
2013	"Rock Your Body Rock" (Dimitri Vegas & Like Mike Remix)	Ferry Corsten	
2013	"Eat, Sleep, Rave, Repeat" (Dimitri Vegas & Like Mike vs. Ummet Ozcan Remix)	Fatboy Slim and Riva Starr (featuring Beardyman)	
2013	"Scream for Love" (Dimitri Vegas & Like Mike Remix)	Natali Yura	
2013	"Get Away" (Dimitri Vegas & Like Mike Remix)	Alex Hide	
2013	"Miracle" (Dimitri Vegas & Like Mike Remix)	Wolfpack (featuring Coco Star)	
2014	"I Am" (Dimitri Vegas & Like Mike vs. Wolfpack & Boostedkids Remix)	Sick Individuals and Axwell (featuring Taylr Renee)	
2014	"Born to Get Wild" (Dimitri Vegas & Like Mike vs. Boostedkids Remix)	Steve Aoki (featuring will.i.am)	
2014	"A Little Bit of Love" (Dimitri Vegas & Like Mike Remix)	Cherry Cherry Boom Boom	
2014	"Spending All My Time" (Dimitri Vegas & Like Mike Remix)	Perfume	
2015	"Don't You Want Me" (Dimitri Vegas & Like Mike Remix)	Felix	
2016	"Heading Up High" (Dimitri Vegas & Like Mike vs. Boostedkids Remix)	Armin Van Buuren (featuring Kensington)	
2016	"Café Del Mar 2016" (Dimitri Vegas & Like Mike Edit)	MATTN & Futuristic Polar Bears	
2016	"Cafè Del Mar 2016" (Dimitri Vegas & Like Mike vs. Klaas Edit)	MATTN & Futuristic Polar Bears	
2016	"F*ck" (Dimitri Vegas & Like Mike Edit)	Bassjackers	
2016	"Go!" (Dimitri Vegas & Like Mike Remix)	Wolfpack vs Avancada	
2016	"The Hills" (Dimitri Vegas & Like Mike Remix)	The Weeknd	
2016	"Lean On" (Dimitri Vegas & Like Mike Tomorrowland Remix)	Major Lazer & DJ Snake (featuring MØ)	
2016	"Hey Baby" (Dimitri Vegas & Like Mike Tomorrowland Remix)	Dimitri Vegas & Like Mike vs Diplo (featuring Deb's Daughter)	
2017	"What Is Love 2016" (Dimitri Vegas & Like Mike Remix)	Lost Frequencies	
2017	"All Aboard" (Dimitri Vegas & Like Mike Edit)	Bassjackers vs. D'Angello & Francis	
2017	"Something Just Like This" (Dimitri Vegas & Like Mike Remix)	The Chainsmokers and Coldplay	
2017	"Renegade Master" (Dimitri Vegas & Like Mike Edit)	M.A.D M.A.C vs. Jamis	
2017	"I Believe I'm Fine" (Dimitri Vegas & Like Mike Remix)	Robin Schulz and HUGEL	
2017	"He's a Pirate" (Zimmer vs. Dimitri Vegas & Like Mike Remix)	Hans Zimmer	
2018	"The House of House" (Dimitri Vegas & Like Mike vs. Vini Vici Remix)	Cherrymoon Trax	
2018	"When I Grow Up" (Dimitri Vegas & Like Mike vs. Hiddn Remix)	Dimitri Vegas & Like Mike (featuring Wiz Khalifa)	
2019	"Selfish" (Dimitri Vegas & Like Mike and Brennan Heart VIP Remix)	Dimitri Vegas & Like Mike (featuring Era Istrefi)	
2019	"Selfish" (Tomorrowland 2013 Aftermovie Remix)	Dimitri Vegas & Like Mike (featuring Era Istrefi)	
2019	"Sound of Synergy" (Dimitri Vegas & Like Mike Remix)	Esso	
2019	"B.F.A. (Best Friend's Ass) [Dimitri Vegas & Like Mike Remix]	Dimitri Vegas & Like Mike (featuring Paris Hilton)	
2019	"Instagram" (Dimitri Vegas & Like Mike and Trobi Remix)	Dimitri Vegas & Like Mike, David Guetta, Daddy Yankee, Afro Bros and Natti Natasha	
2019	"Narcotic" (Dimitri Vegas & Like Mike vs. Ummet Ozcan Remix)	YouNotUs, Janieck & Senex	
2019	"Carnival" (Dimitri Vegas & Like Mike Edit)	Timmy Trumpet, Mattn and Wolfpack (featuring DJ X-Tof)	
2020	"Girlz Wanna Have Fun" (Dimitri Vegas & Like Mike Remix)	Mattn, Stavros Martina, and Kevin D	
2020	"Ride It" (Dimitri Vegas & Like Mike and Quintino Remix)	Regard	
2020	"Kalinka" (Dimitri Vegas & Like Mike Edit)	Timmy Trumpet and Wolfpack (featuring Jaxx & Vega and R3spawn)	
2020	"All this Lovin" (Dimitri Vegas & Like Mike Remix)	Vlade Kay and DJ Snake	
2020	Candyman (Dimitri Vegas & Like Mike, W&W and Ummet Ozcan Remix)	Da Boy Tommy featuring Da Rick	
2021	"Hwaa" (Dimitri Vegas & Like Mike Remix)	(G)I-dle	

=== Dimitri Vegas solo remixes ===
2019

- Dimitri Vegas & Like Mike and Paris Hilton — "B.F.A. (Best Friend's Ass)" (Dimitri Vegas and Ariel Vromen Remix) [Smash The House]
- Dimitri Vegas & Like Mike, Bassjackers and 2WEI — "Mortal Kombat Anthem" (Dimitri Vegas and 2WEI Mortal Kombat 11 Trailer Mix) [Smash The House]

2021

- Dino Warriors and Julian Perretta — "Ayo Technology" (Dimitri Vegas Edit) [Smash The House]
- Ilkay Sencan and Vintage Culture featuring Yoelle — "Superpowers" (Dimitri Vegas Edit) [Smash The House]

=== 3 Are Legend remixes ===
2018

- Dimitri Vegas & Like Mike and W&W – "Crowd Control" (3 Are Legend Remix) [Smash The House]

== Music videos ==
Year	Title	Artists	Ref.
2011	"The Way We See the World"	Afrojack, Dimitri Vegas, Like Mike and NERVO	
2012	"Momentum" (Instrumental Video Edit).mov	Dimitri Vegas, Like Mike & Regi	
2012	"Shed My Skin" (Dimitri Vegas & Like Mike VS Yves V Remix)	D*Note	
2013	"Watch Out for This (Bumaye)" (Dimitri Vegas & Like Mike Tomorrowland Remix)	Major Lazer	
2013	"Eat Sleep Rave Repeat" (Tomorrowland Mix)	Fatboy Slim VS Dimitri Vegas, Like Mike & Ummet Ozcan	
2013	"MORE"	Laidback Luke & Dimitri Vegas & Like Mike	
2013	"Stampede"	Dimitri Vegas & Like Mike vs DVBBS & Borgeous	
2013	"Miracle" (Dimitri Vegas & Like Mike Remix)	Wolfpack (featuring Coco Star)	
2014	"Nova"	Dimitri vegas & Like Mike Vs Tujamo & Felguk	
2014	"G.I.P.S.Y."	Dimitri Vegas & Like Mike vs Boostedkids	
2014	"Body Talk (Mammoth)"	Dimitri Vegas, Moguai & Like Mike (featuring Julian Perretta)	
2014	"Tremor"	Dimitri Vegas, Martin Garrix, Like Mike	
2014	"Find Tomorrow (Ocarina)"	Dimitri Vegas & Like Mike (featuring Wolfpack & Katy B)	
2014	"Tomorrowland Anthem 2014 – Waves"	Dimitri Vegas & Like Mike vs W&W	
2014	"Born to Get Wild" (Dimitri Vegas & Like Mike vs Boostedkids Remix)	Steve Aoki (featuring Will.i.am)	
2014	"Eparrei"	Dimitri Vegas & Like Mike, Diplo & Fatboy Slim (featuring Bonde Do Role & Pin)	
2015	"The Hum"	Dimitri Vegas & Like Mike vs Ummet Ozcan	
2015	"Higher Place"	Dimitri Vegas & Like Mike (featuring Ne-Yo)	
2015	"Tales of Tomorrow"	Dimitri Vegas & Like Mike vs Fedde Le Grand (featuring Julian Perretta)	
2015	"Louder"	Dimitri Vegas & Like Mike vs. VINAI	
2015	"Don't You Want Me 2015" (Dimitri Vegas & Like Mike Remix)	Felix	
2016	"Arcade"	Dimitri Vegas & Like Mike vs W&W	
2016	"Melody"	Dimitri Vegas, Like Mike & Steve Aoki vs Ummet Ozcan	
2016	"Stay a While" (Tomorrowland video)	Dimitri Vegas & Like Mike	
2016	"Go!" (Dimitri Vegas & Like Mike Remix)	Wolfpack vs Avancada	oh did the Boston Red Sox hit a dinger? they did? alright
2016	"F*ck" (Dimitri Vegas & Like Mike Edit)	Bassjackers	
2016	"Stay a While"	Dimitri Vegas & Like Mike	
2016	"Hey Baby"	Dimitri Vegas & Like Mike vs. Diplo (featuring Deb's Daughter)	
2016	"Hey Baby"	Dimitri Vegas & Like Mike vs. Diplo & Kid Ink (featuring Deb's Daughter)	
