= Bassjackers discography =

Bassjackers is an electronic dance music duo, formed in 2007, consisting of Marlon Flohr and Ralph van Hilst, two Dutch DJs and producers.

== Albums ==
=== Studio albums ===
List of studio albums
Title	Album details
The Biggest	Released: 22 November 2019; Label: Spinnin'; Formats: Digital download, CD

== Extended plays ==
2009

- Sujo Soja

2016

- Destiny

2017

- Les Pays Bass

2018

- Les Pays Bass, Vol. 2

2020

2020

- Les Pays Bass, Vol. 3

2020

== Singles ==
=== Charted singles ===
Title	Year	Peak chart positions										Album
Title	Year	NLD	AUS	AUT	BEL	FRA	GER	IRL	SWE	SWI	UK	Album
"16" (with Jorn)	2009	20^{[A]}	—	—	6^{[A]}	—	—	—	—	—	—	Non-album singles
"Rocker"	2010	15^{[A]}	—	—	7^{[A]}	—	—	—	—	—	—	Non-album singles
"Stronger" (featuring Bizzey)	2010	97	—	—	11^{[A]}	—	—	—	—	—	—	Non-album singles
"Clifton"	2010	—	—	—	13^{[A]}	—	—	—	—	—	—	Non-album singles
"Crackin" (Martin Garrix Edit)	2014	72	—	—	29^{[B]}	—	—	—	—	—	—	Non-album singles
"Savior"	2014	—	—	—	57^{[B]}	—	—	—	—	—	—	Non-album singles
"Wave Your Hands" (with Thomas Newson)	2015	—	—	—	62^{[B]}	—	—	—	—	—	—	Non-album singles
"Bring That Beat"	2015	—	—	—	18^{[C]}	—	—	—	—	—	—	Non-album singles
"—" denotes a recording that did not chart or was not released in that territory.

=== Other singles ===
2010:

- Clifton [Samsobeats]
- ' 'Ritmo Do Meu Flow' ' (Ralvero & Bassjackers Remix) [Sneakerz Muzik (Spinnin' Records)]
- Showrocker (with The Partysquad) [Spinnin' Records]
- Bang Like A (with Ralvero) [Spinnin' Records]

2011:

- Rambo (with Ralvero) [Spinnin' Records]
- Mush, Mush [Musical Freedom]
- Brougham/Contour (with Apster) [Wall (Spinnin' Records)]

2012:

- Bronx (with Yves V) [Smash the House (Spinnin' Records)]
- Let’s Get Weird [Free download]
- Ria (with Angger Dimas) [Doorn (Spinnin' Records)]
- Hey! (with Showtek) [Spinnin' Records]

2013:

- Grid (with Dyro) [Spinnin' Records]
- Duckface (with Kenneth G) [Hysteria Recs]
- Collision (with Ferry Corsten) [Spinnin' Records]
- Raise Those Hands (with R3hab) [Fly Eye Records]
- Flag (with Gregori Klosman) [Spinnin' Records]
- Zing [Protocol Recordings]
- Gamer (with GRX) [Doorn (Spinnin' Records)]

2014:

- Crackin (Martin Garrix Edit) [Spinnin' Records]
- Battle (with Jordy Dazz) [Doorn (Spinnin' Records)]
- Derp (with Makj) [Hysteria Recs]
- Rampage (with Kenneth G) [Revealed Recordings]
- Like That [Smash The House]
- Savior [Spinnin' Records]
- X (with Dyro) [Wolv]

2015:

- Wave Your Hands (with Thomas Newson) [Smash The House]
- What We Live For (with Afrojack) [Wall Recordings]
- Alamo (with Brooks) [Skink]
- Memories (with KSHMR featuring Sirah) [Spinnin' Records]
- Bring That Beat [Smash The House]
- Sound Barrier (with Coone and GLDY LX) [Smash The House]
- Rough (with Reez) [Musical Freedom]

2016:

- SPCMN (with Crossnaders) [Free download]
- On The Floor Like (with Joe Ghost featuring MOTi) [Spinnin' Records]
- Marco Polo (with Breathe Carolina & Reez) [Spinnin' Records]
- F*CK (Dimitri Vegas & Like Mike Edit) [Smash The House]
- El Mariachi (with Jay Hardway) [Spinnin' Records]
- Dinosaur (with Jay Hardway) [Free Download/Spinnin' Records]
- Fireflies (featuring Luciana) [Spinnin' Premium]
- Destiny (featuring Mat B) [Spinnin' Premium]
- Extreme (with KSHMR featuring Sidnie Tipton) [Spinnin' Records]
- Pillowfight (vs. Skytech and Fafaq) [Spinnin' Records]

2017:

- Can't Take It (with Breathe Carolina featuring Cade) [Spinnin' Records]
- All Aboard (Dimitri Vegas & Like Mike Edit) (vs. D'Angello & Francis) [Smash The House]
- Joyride (with Brooks) [Spinnin' Records]
- These Heights (with Lucas & Steve featuring Caroline Pennell) [Spinnin' Records]
- Wobble & Jiggle [Spinnin' Records]
- The Fever (vs. Breathe Carolina and Apek) [Spinnin' Records]
- Ready (with L3N) [Spinnin' Records]

2018:

- Last Fight (vs. Crossnaders) [Smash The House]
- Are You Randy? (with Bali Bandits) [Musical Freedom]
- The Riddle [Smash The House]
- Switch (with Blasterjaxx) [Maxximize Records]
- The Jungle (with Dimitri Vegas & Like Mike) [Smash The House]
- Block (with Sunstars) [Spinnin' Records]
- Bounce (with Dimitri Vegas & Like Mike, Julian Banks featuring Snoop Dogg) [Smash The House]
- Zero Fs Given (with Wolfpack)

2019:

- No Style (with Apster) [Spinnin' Records]
- Flip the Beat (with Apek) [Spinnin' Records]
- You're Next (with Dimitri Vegas & Like Mike) (from Mortal Kombat 11) [Smash The House]
- Momento (with Twiig) [Spinnin' Records]
- Snatch [Spinnin' Records]
- Mortal Kombat Anthem (with Dimitri Vegas & Like Mike and 2WEI) [Smash The House]
- Limitless (with Jaxx & Vega) [Spinnin' Records]
- The Flight (with Dimitri Vegas & Like Mike and D'Angello & Francis) [Smash The House]
- Primal (with Dr Phunk) [Spinnin' Records]
- I Wanna Rave (with Steve Aoki) [Ultra Records]
- Mush Mush (2019 Reboot) [Musical Freedom]

2020:

- Big Orgus 2020 (with DJ Furax) [Smash The House]
- Happy Together (with Dimitri Vegas & Like Mike) [Smash The House]
- Want You (So Bad) [Spinnin' Records]
- Motivation [Smash The House]
- Old Money (with Wolfpack featuring Richie Loop) [Smash The House]
- Run Away (with Jaxx & Vega and Futuristic Polar Bears) [Smash The House]
- Halloween (with Wolfpack and Baba Yega) [Smash The House]
- Jingle Bells [Smash The House]
- Born to Run (with Dr. Phunk) [Smash The House]
- Bonzai Channel One (with Dimitri Vegas & Like Mike and Crossnaders) [Smash The House]

2021

- Show Me Your Love [Smash The House]
- Snake Whisperer (with Ang) [Smash The House]
- Helter Skelter (with Moti) [Smash The House]
- Say What U Want [Smash The House]
- Arabian Nights (with Diètro) [Smash The House]
- Scream It (with Makj) [Smash The House]
- Written In The Stars (with Tungevaag) [Spinnin' Records]
- In Doge We Trust (with PleasrDao) [Smash The House]
- All My Love (with Skytech) [Cyb3rpvnk]
- The Weekend [Smash The House]

2022

- De La Sol (with Makj) [Spinnin' Records]
- Dumb Dumb (with Mattn featuring Emy Perez) [Smash The House]
- Psycho (with Harris & Ford featuring Rebecca Helena) [Spinnin' Records]
- Mutant Ape Rave Club (Mutants Are Insane [Smash the House]
- Bored Ape Rave Club [Smash the House]
- Fall (with L3N) [Rave Culture]
- Blink 2022 (with Dimitri Vegas & Like Mike and John Dahlbäck) [Smash the House]
- Lose It (with SaberZ) [Smash the House]
- Oh Mandy) [Smash the House]
- Forever Young (with Tony Junior) [Smash the House]
- Raket (with Dimitri Vegas & Like Mike) [Smash the House]

2023

- Olé Olé (with ANG) [Smash the House]
- Les Pays Bass (EP) [Smash the House]
- Wrong or Right (The Riddle) [Spinnin' Records]
- Traffic [Musical Freedom]
- Komtie (Kom Tie Dan He!) (with Dimitri Vegas & Like Mike, The Darkraver and DJ Norman) [Smash the House]
- 16 Jahre [Heldeep Records]
- We Ride (feat. Teddy Bee) [Spinnin' Records]
- Eternity (with Timmy Trumpet and KSHMR) [Spinnin' Records]

== Remixes ==
Song	Year	Artist(s)
"Glad You Came"	2010	The Wanted
"Rockin'"	2010	Seductive
"Hello"	2010	Martin Solveig with Dragonette
"California King Bed"	2011	Rihanna
"Maximal Crazy"	2011	Tiësto
"Surrender"	2012	Spencer & Hill featuring Ari
"Wild Child"	2013	Adrian Lux and Marcus Schossow featuring JJ
"Dear Life"	2014	Dannic featuring Bright Lights
"Into The Madness"	2015	Coone
"Darker Than Blood"	2015	Steve Aoki featuring Linkin Park
"Higher Place"	2015	Dimitri Vegas & Like Mike featuring Ne-Yo
"No Promises"	2017	Cheat Codes featuring Demi Lovato
"Here with You"	2017	Lost Frequencies and Netsky
"These Heights (Club Mix)"	2017	Bassjackers and Lucas & Steve (featuring Caroline Pennell)
"Complicated"	2017	Dimitri Vegas & Like Mike and David Guetta
"Blah Blah Blah"	2018	Armin van Buuren
"All I Need" (VIP Mix with Bassjackers)	2018	Dimitri Vegas & Like Mike featuring Gucci Mane
"Zombie"	2019	Ran-D
"Instagram"	2019	Dimitri Vegas & Like Mike, David Guetta, Daddy Yankee, Afro Bros and Natti Natasha
"Stickup"	2020	Armin van Buuren
"Ocarina"	2020	Dimitri Vegas & Like Mike featuring Wolfpack
"Hearts on Fire"	2021	Illenium, Dabin and Lights
"Boomshakalaka"	2022	Dimitri Vegas & Like Mike, Afro Bros, Emilia Mernes, Sebastián Yatra & Camilo
"Friends"	2023	Dimitri Vegas, Steve Aoki & Chapter & Verse
