= Cycle of Life =

Cycle of Life or The Cycle of Life may refer to:

- Biological life cycle, a series of stages of the life of an organism

== Artworks ==
- Cycle of Life, a 1924 sculpture by Paul Manship
- Cycle of Life, a 1967 series of works by Siri Berg

== Music ==
- Cycle of Life (album), a 2016 album by Ghost Community
- Cycle of Life, a 1980 album by Sarcofagus
- "Cycle of Life", a 2008 song by 10 Years from Division (10 Years album)
- "Cycle of Life", a 2023 song by 2WEI from Onmyoji
- "The Cycle of Life", a 1997 song by Atlantic Ocean (band)
- The Cycle of Life, a 1997 album by The Choral Project

== Television ==
- "Cycle of Life", a 2020 episode of Absurd Planet
- "Circle of Life" (also known as "Cycle of Life"), a 2014 episode of Alaska: The Last Frontier
- "Cycle of Life" (Battle for Dream Island), a 2010 web series episode
- "Cycle of Life", a 2020 episode of Cake
- "The Cycle of Life", a 2007 episode of Lemur Street

== Other uses ==
- Cycle of Life: A Gold Medal Paralympian's Secrets to Success, a 2015 book by Carol Cooke
- Bawa Thanthayar (lit. 'Cycle of Life'), a 1956 Burmese black-and-white drama film

== See also ==
- Life cycle (disambiguation)
- Circle of Life (disambiguation)
- Poison Ivy: Cycle of Life and Death, a 2016 six-issue American comic book miniseries written by Amy Chu
