= Stay a While =

Single by Dimitri Vegas & Like Mike
- Released: 1 July 2016
- Genre: Deep house • Future bass
- Length: 3:52 (Radio version) 5:02 (Extended Mix)
- Label: Smash the House
- Songwriters: Dimitri Thivaios, Michael Thivaios
- Producers: Dimitri Thivaios, Michael Thivaios

Dimitri Vegas & Like Mike singles chronology
"Melody" (2016)	"Stay a While" (2016)	"Hey Baby" (2016)

"Stay a While" is a song recorded by the Belgian-Greek duo Dimitri Vegas & Like Mike. The single is a summer song which has the vocals from Like Mike, been the second single, after Higher Place, performed by him. The song became a hit in Belgium, reaching the 3rd position in Ultratop 50.

== Music video ==
A music video for the single was uploaded on the duo's YouTube channel at a total length of three minutes and fifty-six seconds.

== Track listing ==
Digital download (Belgium)
No.	Title	Length
1.	"Stay a While" (Radio Edit)	3:52
2.	"Stay a While" (Extended Mix)	5:02
3.	"Stay a While" (Acapella)	4:24
4.	"Stay a While" (Magic Wand Extended Remix)	4:02

== Chart performance ==
=== Weekly charts ===
Chart (2016)	Peak position
Belgium (Ultratop 50 Flanders)	3
Belgium (Ultratop 50 Wallonia)	31
