= Life or Death =

Life or Death may refer to:

== Books ==
- Life or Death, novel by the Kazakh author Gabiden Mustafin 1941
- Life or Death, novel by the Bulgarian author Dimiter Angelov
- Life or Death (novel), a novel by Michael Robotham 2014

== Film ==
- Life or Death (film), a 1955 Egyptian film
- Life or Death (Bulgarian film) (bg:На живот и смърт) 1974 Bulgarian film based on Angelov's novel

== Music ==
- Life or Death (C-Murder album), 1998
- Life or Death (Lili Añel album), 2008

== See also ==
- Life and death (disambiguation)
