= A Matter of Life and Death =

A Matter of Life and Death may refer to:

== Film ==
- A Matter of Life and Death (1946 film), starring David Niven
- A Matter of Life and Death, a 1972 film based on a novel by Yannis Maris
- A Matter of Life and Death, a 1981 television film based on the life of Joy Ufema, a nurse and thanatologist
- A Matter of Life and Death (2025 film), a romcom film directed by Anas Ba-Tahaf

== Television episodes ==
- "A Matter of Life and Death", Against the Wind episode 10 (1978)
- "A Matter of Life and Death", Baywatch season 3, episode 12 (1993)
- "A Matter of Life and Death", Climax! season 4, episode 11 (1957)
- "A Matter of Life and Death", Desmond's series 5, episode 12 (1993)
- "A Matter of Life and Death", I Am a Killer season 1, episode 10 (2018)
- "A Matter of Life and Death", Law of the Plainsman episode 3 (1959)
- "A Matter of Life and Death", Norman Corwin Presents episode 22 (1972)
- "A Matter of Life and Death", Secret Army series 2, episode 11 (1978)
- "A Matter of Life and Death", Sisters season 2, episode 17 (1992)
- "A Matter of Life and Death", The Ambassador series 2, episode 5 (1999)
- "A Matter of Life and Death", The Bill series 9, episode 84 (1993)
- "A Matter of Life and Death", The Event episode 4 (2010)
- "A Matter of Life and Death", The Honeymooners episode 5 (1955)
- "A Matter of Life and Death", The Protectors series 1, episode 16 (1973)
- "Matter of Life and Death", Space: 1999 series 1, episode 13 (1975)
- "Matters of Life and Death", All Creatures Great and Small (1978) series 3, episode 12 (1980)
- "Matters of Life and Death", Quincy, M.E. season 3, episode 14 (1978)
- "Matters of Life and Death", Seven Seconds episode 3 (2018)

== Literature ==
=== Fiction ===
- A Matter of Death and Life, a 1996 novel by Andrey Kurkov
- A Matter of Life and Death, a 2009 book by Alistair McGowan and Ronni Ancona
- A Matter of Life and Death, a 2016 Doctor Who graphic novel written by George Mann, featuring the Eighth Doctor
- A Matter of Life and Death, a 2021 novel by Phillip Margolin
- A Matter of Life and Death, a 2022 novel by Simon R. Green, the second installment in the Gideon Sable series
- Matters of Life and Death: New American Stories, a 1983 short story anthology edited by Tobias Wolff
- Matters of Life & Death, a 2006 short story collection by Bernard MacLaverty

=== Non-fiction ===
- A Matter of Death and Life, a 2021 non-fiction book by Irvin D. Yalom and Marilyn Yalom

== Other uses ==
- A Matter of Life and Death (album), 2006 by Iron Maiden
- A Matter of Life and Death (play), a 2007 stage adaptation of the 1946 film

== See also ==
- Life and death (disambiguation)
