= Thank You (Not So Bad) =

Single by Dimitri Vegas & Like Mike, Tiësto, Dido and W&W
- Released: 1 December 2023
- Recorded: 2023
- Length: 2:20
- Label: Sony
- Songwriters: Dido Armstrong; Paul Herman
- Producers: Dimitri Vegas & Like Mike; Tiesto; W&W; Ralph Van Hilst; Marlon Flohr; Renze Michels

Dimitri Vegas & Like Mike singles chronology
"She Knows" (2023)	"Thank You (Not So Bad)" (2023)	"Explode" (2024)

Tiësto singles chronology
"Run Free (Countdown)" (2023)	"Thank You (Not So Bad)" (2023)	"All My Life" (2024)

Dido singles chronology
"When Love Sucks" (2023)	"Thank You (Not So Bad)" (2023)

W&W singles chronology
"Ritmo De La Noche (Vamos A La Playa)" (2023)	"Thank You (Not So Bad)" (2023)	"Why am I doing this?" (2024)

Music video
- "Thank You (Not So Bad)" on YouTube

"Thank You (Not So Bad)" is a song by Belgian DJ duo Dimitri Vegas & Like Mike, Dutch DJ Tiësto, Dutch DJ duo W&W and English singer Dido. Released on 1 December 2023, the song is a remake of Dido's single, "Thank You", which uses the first verse as the chorus.

== Background ==
The song was played by Dimitri Vegas & Like Mike in their sets at many festivals prior to its launch and had also been played by Tiësto and W&W during their sets. While the original did not contain original vocals by Dido yet, the singer decided to get into the studio and lend her vocals after finding footage of the song circulating online.

== Charts ==
=== Weekly charts ===
Weekly chart performance for "Thank You (Not So Bad)"
Chart (2023–2024)	Peak position
Australia Dance (ARIA)	18
Austria (Ö3 Austria Top 40)	14
Belgium (Ultratop 50 Flanders)	28
Belgium (Ultratop 50 Wallonia)	22
Czech Republic Airplay (ČNS IFPI)	21
Czech Republic Singles Digital (ČNS IFPI)	22
Denmark (Tracklisten)	40
France (SNEP)	85
Germany (GfK)	16
Global 200 (Billboard)	148
Greece International (IFPI)	86
Ireland (IRMA)	36
Lithuania (AGATA)	94
Luxembourg (Billboard)	17
Netherlands (Dutch Top 40)	16
Netherlands (Single Top 100)	14
Norway (VG-lista)	38
Poland (Polish Streaming Top 100)	61
Portugal (AFP)	199
Slovakia Singles Digital (ČNS IFPI)	20
Sweden (Sverigetopplistan)	33
Switzerland (Schweizer Hitparade)	14
UK Singles (OCC)	50
UK Dance (OCC)	15
US Hot Dance/Electronic Songs (Billboard)	12

=== Year-end charts ===
2024 year-end chart performance for "Thank You (Not So Bad)"
Chart (2024)	Position
Australia Dance (ARIA)	38
Austria (Ö3 Austria Top 40)	19
Belgium (Ultratop 50 Flanders)	53
Belgium (Ultratop 50 Wallonia)	56
Denmark (Tracklisten)	65
Germany (GfK)	17
Hungary (Single Top 40)	83
Netherlands (Dutch Top 40)	61
Netherlands (Single Top 100)	27
Sweden (Sverigetopplistan)	33
Switzerland (Schweizer Hitparade)	36
US Hot Dance/Electronic Songs (Billboard)	49

2025 year-end chart performance for "Thank You (Not So Bad)"
Chart (2025)	Position
Austria (Ö3 Austria Top 40)	67
Belgium (Ultratop 50 Flanders)	155
Belgium (Ultratop 50 Wallonia)	186
Germany (GfK)	52

== Certifications ==
Certifications for "Thank You (Not So Bad)"
Region	Certification	Certified units/sales
Austria (IFPI Austria)	2× Platinum	60,000^{‡}
Belgium (BRMA)	3× Platinum	60,000^{‡}
Canada (Music Canada)	Gold	40,000^{‡}
Denmark (IFPI Danmark)	Platinum	90,000^{‡}
France (SNEP)	Platinum	200,000^{‡}
Germany (BVMI)	Platinum	600,000^{‡}
Hungary (MAHASZ)	6× Platinum	24,000^{‡}
Italy (FIMI)	Gold	50,000^{‡}
New Zealand (RMNZ)	Platinum	30,000^{‡}
Poland (ZPAV)	2× Platinum	100,000^{‡}
Spain (Promusicae)	Platinum	100,000^{‡}
Switzerland (IFPI Switzerland)	Platinum	30,000^{‡}
United Kingdom (BPI)	Gold	400,000^{‡}
^{‡} Sales+streaming figures based on certification alone.
