= X (Nicky Jam and J Balvin song) =

2018 single by Nicky Jam and J Balvin

Single by Nicky Jam and J Balvin

from the album Íntimo
- Language: Spanish
- Released: March 2, 2018
- Genre: Spanish dancehall
- Length: 2:53
- Label: Sony Latin
- Songwriters: Nick Rivera; José Osorio; Juan Diego Medina; Jonathan Thiel; Skrrt; Shareef Bedloe; Giordano Ashruf
- Producers: Jeon; Afro Bros

Nicky Jam singles chronology
"Bella y Sensual" (2017)	"X" (2018)	"Just Gettin' Started" (2018)

J Balvin singles chronology
"Ahora" (2018)	"X" (2018)	"Dime" (2018)

Music video
- "X" on YouTube

"X", also listed as "X (Equis)", is a song by American singer Nicky Jam and Colombian singer J Balvin. Written by the two singers, Juan Diego Medina, Giordano Ashruf and its producers, Jeon and Afro Bros, it was released by Sony Music Latin on March 2, 2018. It is a Spanish dancehall song, featuring a synth trumpet hook and elements of reggae, reggaeton, Latin pop and Afrobeats. A Spanglish version of the song was released on April 27, 2018. On June 28, 2018, a remix version featuring vocals by artists Maluma and Ozuna was released. The accompanying audio was also released on Nicky Jam's YouTube channel on the same day. The song topped the charts in Spain, Italy, Portugal, Bolivia, El Salvador, Panama, Paraguay and Peru. Nicky Jam performed the song solo during the 2018 FIFA World Cup closing ceremony.

== Music video ==
The music video for "X" was filmed in Miami and directed by Jessy Terrero. It was released on March 1, 2018, on Nicky Jam's YouTube account. It features Nicky Jam and J Balvin dancing in a vibrant colored room inside a plane. As of March 2026, the video has over 2.3 billion views on YouTube. Writing for NPR, Sidney Madden described the video as "a clean and vivid affair", likening it to Sean Paul's "I'm Still in Love with You" and Drake's "Hotline Bling".

== Track listings ==
Digital download
No.	Title	Length
1.	"X"	2:53

Digital download – Spanglish Version
No.	Title	Length
1.	"X" (Spanglish Version)	2:52

Digital download – Remix
No.	Title	Length
1.	"X" (Remix) (with Maluma and Ozuna)	3:56

== Charts ==
=== Weekly charts ===
Chart (2018)	Peak position
Argentina (Argentina Hot 100)	17
Austria (Ö3 Austria Top 40)	33
Belgium (Ultratop 50 Flanders)	19
Belgium (Ultratop 50 Wallonia)	12
Bolivia (Monitor Latino)	1
Canada Hot 100 (Billboard)	39
Chile (Monitor Latino)	2
Colombia (National-Report)	2
Costa Rica (Monitor Latino)	10
Croatia (HRT)	63
Czech Republic Singles Digital (ČNS IFPI)	80
Dominican Republic (SODINPRO)	3
Ecuador (National-Report)	3
El Salvador (Monitor Latino)	1
France (SNEP)	5
Germany (GfK)	13
Guatemala (Monitor Latino)	4
Honduras (Monitor Latino)	2
Hungary (Dance Top 40)	11
Hungary (Single Top 40)	37
Hungary (Stream Top 40)	32
Ireland (IRMA)	67
Italy (FIMI)	1
Mexico (Billboard Mexican Airplay)	4
Mexico Streaming (AMPROFON)	1
Netherlands (Dutch Top 40)	3
Netherlands (Single Top 100)	5
Nicaragua (Monitor Latino)	3
Norway (VG-lista)	24
Panama (Monitor Latino)	1
Paraguay (Monitor Latino)	1
Peru (Monitor Latino)	1
Poland Airplay (ZPAV)	30
Portugal (AFP)	1
Romania Airplay (Media Forest)	2
Russia Airplay (Tophit)	78
Scotland Singles (Official Charts)	79
Slovakia Airplay (ČNS IFPI)	37
Slovakia Singles Digital (ČNS IFPI)	45
Spain (Promusicae)	1
Spain (PROMUSICAE) Remix	15
Sweden (Sverigetopplistan)	30
Switzerland (Schweizer Hitparade)	3
UK Singles (Official Charts)	74
Uruguay (Monitor Latino)	3
US Billboard Hot 100	41
US Hot Latin Songs (Billboard)	1
US Latin Airplay (Billboard)	1
US Pop Airplay (Billboard)	39
US Rhythmic Airplay (Billboard)	39
Venezuela (Monitor Latino)	5

Chart (2025)	Peak position
Global Excl. US (Billboard)	194
Greece International (IFPI)	60

=== Monthly charts ===
Chart (2018)	Peak position
Brazil Streaming (Pro-Música)	32

=== Year-end charts ===
Chart (2018)	Position
Argentina (Monitor Latino)	10
Austria (Ö3 Austria Top 40)	72
Belgium (Ultratop Flanders)	83
Belgium (Ultratop Wallonia)	53
Canada (Canadian Hot 100)	95
France (SNEP)	10
Germany (Official German Charts)	44
Hungary (Dance Top 40)	74
Italy (FIMI)	8
Netherlands (Dutch Top 40)	44
Netherlands (Single Top 100)	24
Portugal (AFP)	2
Romania (Airplay 100)	11
Spain (PROMUSICAE)	10
Spain (PROMUSICAE) Maluma & Ozuna remix	74
Switzerland (Schweizer Hitparade)	11
US Billboard Hot 100	90
US Hot Latin Songs (Billboard)	4
Chart (2019)	Position
Portugal (AFP)	174
US Hot Latin Songs (Billboard)	41
Chart (2025)	Position
Switzerland (Schweizer Hitparade)	92

=== Decade-end charts ===
Chart (2010–2019)	Position
US Hot Latin Songs (Billboard)	23

== Certifications ==
Region	Certification	Certified units/sales
Belgium (BRMA)	Gold	10,000^{‡}
Canada (Music Canada)	3× Platinum	240,000^{‡}
Denmark (IFPI Danmark)	Gold	45,000^{‡}
France (SNEP)	Diamond	333,333^{‡}
Germany (BVMI)	Gold	200,000^{‡}
Hungary (MAHASZ)	3× Platinum	12,000^{‡}
Italy (FIMI)	3× Platinum	150,000^{‡}
Mexico (AMPROFON)	3× Diamond+Platinum	960,000^{‡}
Netherlands (NVPI)	Platinum	80,000^{‡}
Poland (ZPAV)	Platinum	20,000^{‡}
Portugal (AFP)	6× Platinum	150,000^{‡}
Spain (Promusicae)	3× Platinum	120,000^{‡}
Spain (Promusicae) Remix version	Platinum	40,000^{‡}
Switzerland (IFPI Switzerland)	2× Platinum	40,000^{‡}
United Kingdom (BPI)	Gold	400,000^{‡}
United States (RIAA)	35× Platinum (Latin)	2,100,000^{‡}
^{‡} Sales+streaming figures based on certification alone.

== See also ==
- List of number-one hits of 2018 (Italy)
- List of number-one songs of 2018 (Mexico)
- List of number-one singles of 2018 (Spain)
- List of Billboard number-one Latin songs of 2018
