= Mammoth (Dimitri Vegas, Moguai and Like Mike song) =

2013 single by Dimitri Vegas & Like Mike

Single by Dimitri Vegas, Moguai and Like Mike
- Released: 4 March 2013
- Genre: Big room house
- Length: 5:32 (original mix); 2:40 (radio edit)
- Label: Spinnin'
- Songwriters: Dimitri Thivaios, Michael Thivaios, André Tegeler
- Producers: Dimitri Vegas & Like Mike, Moguai

Dimitri Vegas & Like Mike singles chronology
"Wakanda" (2013)	"Mammoth" (2013)	"Chattahoochee" (2013)

Moguai singles chronology
"Brunette" (2012)	"Mammoth" (2013)	"Champs" (2013)

"Mammoth" is a song by Belgian electronic DJ duo Dimitri Vegas & Like Mike and German DJ and producer Moguai. It was released on Beatport on 4 March 2013. The song charted in Belgium, Germany, France, and the Netherlands. The song also recently finished second in Tomorrowland Radio Ones top 1000 songs ever played at Tomorrowland.

== Track listing ==
Digital download
No.	Title	Length
1.	"Mammoth" (Radio Version)	2:40
2.	"Mammoth"	5:32
3.	"Mammoth (Heroes x Villains & Carnage Remix)"	4:23
4.	"Mammoth (Coone Remix)"	4:41

== Chart performance ==
=== Weekly charts ===
Chart (2013)	Peak position
Belgium (Ultratip Bubbling Under Flanders)	44
France (SNEP)	193
Germany (GfK)	90
Hungary (Dance Top 40)	20
Netherlands (Single Top 100)	89
US Hot Dance/Electronic Songs (Billboard)	40

=== Year-end charts ===
Chart (2013)	Position
Hungary (Dance Top 40)	54

== Body Talk (Mammoth) ==
"Body Talk (Mammoth)"

Single by Dimitri Vegas, Moguai and Like Mike featuring Julian Perretta
- Released: 1 September 2014
- Genre: Electro house, big room house
- Length: 3:27; 4:50 (extended mix)
- Label: Spinnin'
- Songwriters: Dimitri Thivaios, Michael Thivaios, André Tegeler, Julian Perretta, Matthew Koma
- Producers: Dimitri Vegas & Like Mike, Moguai

Dimitri Vegas & Like Mike singles chronology
"Waves" (2014)	"Body Talk (Mammoth)" (2014)	"Nova" (2014)

Moguai singles chronology
"Real Life" (2014)	"Body Talk (Mammoth)" (2014)	"K I X S" (2014)

Julian Perretta singles chronology
"Wildfire" (2014)	"Body Talk (Mammoth)" (2014)	"Tales of Tomorrow" (2015)

Music video
- "Body Talk (Mammoth)" on YouTube

A year and a half later on 1 September 2014, "Mammoth" was re-released in a vocal version titled "Body Talk (Mammoth)" (also known as simply "Body Talk"), featuring vocals from English singer-songwriter Julian Perretta, co-written by American singer-songwriter Matthew Koma. Though this version was not as successful as the original instrumental, it peaked much higher in Belgium and also charted in France.

=== Music video ===
A music video to accompany the release of the vocal version was released on Spinnin' Records' YouTube channel on 9 August 2014 at a total length of three minutes and fifty-eight seconds. The video features model Lauren Niko, and is a one-shot for the first three and a half minutes until the song ends.

=== Track listing ===
Digital download
No.	Title	Length
1.	"Body Talk (Mammoth)"	3:27

=== Chart performance ===
==== Weekly charts ====
Chart (2014)	Peak position
Belgium (Ultratop 50 Flanders)	2
Belgium (Ultratop 50 Wallonia)	25
France (SNEP)	106

==== Year-end charts ====
Chart (2014)	Position
Belgium (Ultratop Flanders)	41
