= Circle of Life (disambiguation) =

"Circle of Life" is a Disney song from the 1994 animated film The Lion King.

Circle of life may also refer to:

- Circle of life, biological life cycle of procreation, birth, life, and death
- Circle of life, social circle, a community or subculture of a location
- Circle of life, called Ensō in Zen
- The "circle of life" or "course of nature", a concept mentioned in Christian New Testament in James 3 § Verse 6

== Disney ==
- Sing-Along Songs: Circle of Life, 1994 Disney karaoke version of the song
- Circle of Life: An Environmental Fable, a 1995 Disney film

== Music ==
- The Circle of Life (album), a 2005 album by Freedom Call
- Circle of Life, a 1992 album by Magpie (folk duo)
- '"Ben Leef" ("The Circle of Life")', a song by Samira Said
- "Circle of Life", a 2000 song by U.P.O. from the album No Pleasantries
- "Circle of Life", a 2005 song by G4 from the album G4 (album)
- "Circle of Life", a 2006 song by Termanology from the album Out the Gate
- "Circle of Life", a 2008 song by Greek heavy metal band Firewind from the album Live Premonition
- "Circle of Life", the theme song for the 2008 film Kamen Rider Kiva: King of the Castle in the Demon World

== Television ==
- "The Circle of Life", an episode of All Saints, see All Saints (season 11)
- "Circle of Life", an episode of Good Eats, see List of Good Eats episodes
- "Circle of Life", an episode of Lassie, see Lassie (season 18)
- "The Circle of Life", an episode of Notes from the Underbelly, see List of Notes from the Underbelly episodes
- "Circle of Life" (Slow Horses), a 2026 episode
- "Circle of Life", an episode of Walker: Texas Ranger, see List of Walker, Texas Ranger episodes

== Literature ==
- "Circle of Life", a story by Bruce Coville from the anthology series Bruce Coville's Book of Monsters
- The Circle of Life: Replacing Hardship with Love, a book by Walter Mikac

== Other uses ==
- Circle of Life (horse)
- Circle of Life Foundation
- Circle of Life Cemetery, a cemetery in Cook County, Illinois

== See also ==
- Cycle of Life (disambiguation)
- Life and death (disambiguation)
- Jeevana Chakra (lit. 'Circle of Life'), a 1985 Indian Telugu-language film
