= Life history =

Life history may refer to:

- Life history theory, a theory of biological evolution that seeks to explain aspects of organisms' anatomy and behavior by reference to the way that their life histories have been shaped by natural selection
- Life history (sociology), the overall picture of an informant's or interviewee's life
- Medical life history, information gained by a physician by asking specific questions of a patient

== See also ==
- Life cycle (disambiguation)
