= Life cycle =

Life cycle, life-cycle, or lifecycle may refer to:

== Arts and entertainment ==
- Life Cycles (The Word Alive album), 2012
- Life Cycle (Dave Holland album), 1983
- Life Cycle (Sieges Even album), 1988
- Life Cycle (Whit Dickey album), 2001
- Life Cycle (Sakerock album), 2005
- Lifecycle (album), a 2008 album by Yellowjackets

== Science and technology ==
- Biological life cycle, the sequence of life stages that an organism undergoes from conception to reproduction
- Life-cycle hypothesis, in economics
- Program lifecycle phase, a stage that a computer program undergoes, from creation to deployment
- Software release life cycle
- Systems development life cycle, a process for planning, creating, testing, and deploying, maintaining, and ultimate disposal of system in all phases of existence

== Business ==
- Enterprise life cycle, the process of changing a business enterprise
- Project life cycle
- Product lifecycle, the stages in the lifespan of a commercial or consumer product
- Records life-cycle, the treatment of records from their creation to archiving or destruction
- Life-cycle assessment, the analysis of the environmental impacts associated with a product
- Technology life cycle, the commercial gain of a product

== Other uses ==
- Jewish life cycle, a series of traditions associated with major life events in Judaism
- Life cycle ritual, a ritual to mark certain events in an individual's lifetime

== See also ==
- Āśrama (stage), life stages in Hinduism
- Adobe LiveCycle, a server software product used to build applications that automate business processes
- Cycle of Life (disambiguation)
- Erikson's stages of psychosocial development, in psychoanalysis
- Jeevana Chakra (lit. 'Life Cycle'), a 1985 Indian Telugu-language film
- Life history (disambiguation)
- New product development, the process of bringing a new product to market
- Object lifetime, of an object in object-oriented programming
