= She Knows (Dimitri Vegas & Like Mike song) =

Single by Dimitri Vegas & Like Mike, David Guetta, Afro Bros and Akon

from the album Rewind +Repeat
- Released: 21 July 2023
- Genre: House; dance-pop
- Length: 2:15
- Label: Smash the House
- Songwriters: Dimitri Thivaios; Michael Thivaios; David Guetta; Aliaune Damala Badara Akon Thiam; Bob Sandee; Dieter Kranenburg; Fabian Bohn; Giordano Ashruf; Joren van der Voort; Michel Rozenbroek; Rashid Badloe; Robin Albers; Shareef Badloe
- Producers: Dimitri Thivaios; Michael Thivaios; David Guetta; Fabian Bohn; Bob Sandee

Dimitri Vegas & Like Mike singles chronology
| "Komtie (Kom Tie Dan He!)" (2023) | "She Knows" (2023) | "Thank You (Not So Bad)" (2023) |

"She Knows" is a song by Belgian DJ duo Dimitri Vegas & Like Mike in collaboration with French DJ David Guetta and Dutch DJ duo Afro Bros featuring vocals from American singer Akon. The song is the duo's third collaboration with David Guetta, after "Complicated" and "Instagram" and the third collaboration with Afro Bros after "Instagram" and "Boomshakalaka". The song will be featured on the duo's debut album Rewind + Repeat.

== Background ==
On 20 July 2023, at The Gathering, a party organised before Tomorrowland, the duo announced the forthcoming release of their debut studio album Rewind + Repeat. On 23 July 2023, in an interview at One World Radio they declared that "She Knows" will be the first of a series of songs that they will release for the album. Before its release, the single was exclusively broadcast on One World Radio.

== Track listing ==
Digital download
| No. | Title | Length |
|---|---|---|
| 1. | "She Knows" (original mix) | 2:15 |
| 2. | "She Knows" (extended mix) | 3:10 |

== Charts ==
=== Weekly charts ===
Weekly chart performance for "She Knows"
| Chart (2023) | Peak position |
|---|---|
| Belgium (Ultratop 50 Flanders) | 15 |
| Belgium (Ultratop 50 Wallonia) | 30 |
| France (Club 40) | 4 |
| Latvia (EHR) | 20 |
| Netherlands (Dutch Top 40) | 4 |
| Netherlands (Single Top 100) | 15 |
| US Hot Dance/Electronic Songs (Billboard) | 38 |

=== Year-end charts ===
Year-end chart performance for "She Knows"
| Chart (2023) | Position |
|---|---|
| Belgium (Ultratop 50 Flanders) | 78 |
| Netherlands (Dutch Top 40) | 48 |
