= Life and death (disambiguation) =

Life and death is a fundamental concept in the game of Go.

Life and death may also refer to:

- Life and death, opposite conditions that distinguish organisms from inorganic objects, i.e. non-life

== Music ==
- Life and Death (album), a 2014 album by Confession
- "Life and Death", a song by Iced Earth from their 1990 album, Iced Earth
- "Life and Death", a song by Screaming Jets from their 1994 album, The Screaming Jets
- "Life and Death", a song by Terror from their 2003 album, Lowest of the Low

== Film and television ==
- Life and Death (1943 film), a Swedish drama film
- Life and Death (1980 film), a Norwegian film
- "Life and Death" (Dynasty), an episode of the TV series Dynasty
- "Life and Death" (Tales of the Jedi)

== Other uses ==
- Life & Death, a 1988 computer game
- Life and Death: Unapologetic Writings on the Continuing War on Women, a 1997 book by Andrea Dworkin
- Life and Death: Twilight Reimagined, a 2015 novel by Stephenie Meyer
- Life and Death, a 2015 story arc in the Walking Dead comics series
- Aliens vs. Predator: Life and Death, a 2016–2017 limited series in the Aliens vs. Predator comics series

== See also ==
- Life or Death (disambiguation)
- A Matter of Life and Death (disambiguation)
- Circle of life (disambiguation)
