= Ralvero =

Dutch DJ (born 1986)

- Born: Ralf Baartmans; 27 June 1986 (age 39); Roosendaal, Netherlands
- Genres: Dutch house; Big room house; Electro house; Progressive house; Future bass
- Occupations: Musician; DJ; record producer
- Instruments: Piano; Guitar; Synthesizer
- Years active: 2008–present
- Labels: Spinnin' Records; Doorn Records; Revealed Recordings; Mixmash Records
- Website: ralvero.com/

Ralf Baartmans (born Roosendaal, Netherlands 27 June 1986), better known by his stage name Ralvero, is a Dutch DJ and record producer.

He is a part of Spinnin' Records, the label on which he released most of his singles.

== Discography ==
=== Singles ===
==== Charted singles ====
Year	Title	Peak chart positions												Album
Year	Title	NLD	AUS	AUT	BEL (Vl)	BEL (Wa)	FIN	FRA	GER	IRL	SWE	SWI	UK	Album
2008	"Wicked"	62	—	—	—	—	—	—	—	—	—	—	—	Non-album singles
2008	"Pump It Loud"	11^{[A]}	—	—	—	—	—	—	—	—	—	—	—	Non-album singles
2008	"Party People"	53	—	—	—	—	—	—	—	—	—	—	—	Non-album singles
2009	"Party People" (featuring MC Boogshe)	18	—	—	—	—	—	—	—	—	—	—	—	Non-album singles
2009	"Killer Bee"	21^{[A]}	—	—	—	—	—	—	—	—	—	—	—	Non-album singles
2009	"Loose Control" (featuring Dadz "N" Effect)	25^{[A]}	—	—	—	—	—	—	—	—	—	—	—	Non-album singles
2010	"Samir's Theme 2011" (vs. King Mir 2)	25^{[A]}	—	—	30^{[A]}	—	—	—	—	—	—	—	—	Non-album singles
"—" denotes a recording that did not chart or was not released in that territory.

==== Other singles ====
- 2010: In My Bedroom (with Dadz N Effect) [Spinnin' Records]
- 2010: Bang Like A (with Bassjackers) [Spinnin' Records]
- 2011: Rambo (with Bassjackers) [Spinnin' Records]
- 2011: Xtreme [Hysteria Recs (Spinnin')]
- 2012: Rage [Hysteria Recs (Spinnin')]
- 2013: Jackpot (with Quintino) [Spinnin' Records]
- 2013: Fuck What U Heard [Hysteria Recs (Spinnin')]
- 2014: Spicebomb (featuring Nicci) [Hysteria Recs]
- 2014: Hayao (with Dropgun) [DOORN (Spinnin')]
- 2014: Noise [Oxygen]
- 2014: District [Revealed Recordings]
- 2014: Mayday [Oxygen]
- 2015: Rock The World [Metanoia Music (Arisa Audio)]
- 2015: Supa Woofa [Oxygen]
- 2015: Dreamin' (with Kill The Buzz) [Revealed Recordings]
- 2015: Trivia (with Jimmy Clash) [Oxygen]
- 2015: Mad (with Karim Mika) [Revealed]
- 2015: Generation [SKINK]
- 2015: Party People 2k15 [DOORN (Spinnin')]
- 2016: U Got 2 Know [Maxximize Records]
- 2016: Hunkaar [Armada Zouk]
- 2016: Run Wild (featuring Ina) [Mixmash Records]
- 2017: XOXO (with Laidback Luke featuring Ina) [Mixmash Records]
- 2017: Bubblegum (with Redhead Roman) [Mixmash Deep]
