= Absurd Planet =

2020 American TV series

- Genre: Nature documentary
- Composer: Edmund Butt
- Country of origin: United States
- Original language: English
- No. of seasons: 1
- No. of episodes: 12

Production
- Running time: 19 minutes
- Production companies: Condé Nast Entertainment; Love Productions USA

Original release
- Network: Netflix
- Release: April 22, 2020

Absurd Planet (stylized as Absurd! Planet) is a nature documentary television series produced by Condé Nast Entertainment and Love Productions USA and distributed by Netflix. The series follows the planet's most absurd animals.

== Cast ==
- Afi Ekulona - Mother Nature
- Ashlee Willis - As herself
- Paul Raff - As himself
- Christopher Zane Gordon - As himself
- Alfonso Lopez - As himself (12 episodes)/Associate Story Producer (12 episodes)
- Shalla Yudelevich - As herself (5 episodes)/Associate Producer (12 episodes)
- Steven Marmalstein - As himself (12 episodes)/Executive Producer (12 episodes)
- Thomas Mitchell - As himself (12 episodes)/Editor (12 episodes)
- Jeff Wild - As himself (12 episodes)/Consulting Producer (12 episodes)
- Colee Whitacre - As herself (8 episodes)/Story Assistant (11 episodes)
- Rich Gustus - As himself (10 episodes)/Executive in Charge (12 episodes)
- Daniel Brown - As himself (3 episodes)/Editor (10 episodes)
- Vanessa Fragoso
- Anna Pousho
- Paul Raff
- Mae Bartek
- Bushra Butt
- Sami Clark
- Steve Collins
- Melissa Fragoso
- Alexandra Komisaruk
- Seiko Murakami
- Kayla Murray
- Ignacio Pinerua
- Karen Segal
- Gina Stickley - As Harriett the Hermit Crab

== Release ==
Absurd Planet was released on April 22, 2020 on Netflix.

== Episodes ==
- S1E1 "Strangest Things"
- S1E2 "Raging Waters"
- S1E3 "Mate Expectations"
- S1E4 "The Cycle of Life"
- S1E5 "H2 wOah"
- S1E6 "Extremeliest"
- S1E7 "The Flight Stuff"
- S1E8 "Eat Prey, Live"
- S1E9 "Fights, Camera, Action!"
- S1E10 "Strangerer Things"
- S1E11 "We're All the Same"
- S1E12 "Absurd Is the Word"
