= Dimiter Angelov =

- Димитър Ангелов
- Born: September 27, 1904; Blateshnitsa, Principality of Bulgaria, Ottoman Empire
- Died: December 27, 1977 (aged 73); Sofia, People's Republic of Bulgaria
- Resting place: Central Sofia Cemetery
- Education: Sofia University
- Writing career
- Notable awards: Dimitrov Prize (1960)

Dimiter Angelov (Димитър Ангелов 1904-1977) was a Bulgarian writer best known for the novel Life or Death („На живот и смърт"), which was made into a Bulgarian film in 1974.
