= The Hum (Dimitri Vegas & Like Mike song) =

Single by Dimitri Vegas & Like Mike vs. Ummet Ozcan
- Released: 20 April 2015
- Genre: Big room house
- Length: 5:56 (original); 3:31 (short edit)
- Label: Smash The House
- Songwriters: Dimitri Thivaios, Michael Thivaios, Ummet Ozcan
- Producers: Dimitri Thivaios, Michael Thivaios, Ummet Ozcan

Dimitri Vegas & Like Mike singles chronology
"Tales of Tomorrowland" (2015)	"The Hum" (2015)	"Higher Place" (2015)

Music video
- "The Hum" on YouTube

The Hum is a song by the Belgian-Greek DJ duo Dimitri Vegas & Like Mike in collaboration with the Dutch DJ Ummet Ozcan. The song was released on 20 April 2015 and the instrumental belongs to the music genre Electro house. The song uses a sample from the 2013 movie The Wolf of Wall Street, which was the reason of the initial title of the song, The Wolf.

== Composition ==
The single was written and produced by Dimitri and Michael Thivaios, along Ummet Ozcan. It uses the humming and chest tapping that the characters Jordan Belfort and Mark Hanna (played by Leonardo DiCaprio and Matthew McConaughey, respectively) make in the movie The Wolf of Wall Street, along the repeating shout "Raise them up when the bass be dropping!" and "Raise them up when we don't stop rocking!".

== Promotion ==
The song was first played by Dimitri Vegas & Like Mike on July 18, 2014 at Tomorrowland 2014 and received positive acclaim which lead to the speculation about an early release under the initial title The Wolf, named after the sample from The Wolf of Wall Street. In March 2015 was announced the release of the single, but under the title The Hum, causing confusion among fans as it was heavily assumed the track would appear under the name The Wolf. On March 29, 2015, Like Mike posted a video on his Snapchat story where he, Dimitri Vegas and all of management were having dinner together while humming the tune and patting their chests.

== Music video ==
A screenshot from the music video, depicting Dimitri Vegas arm wrestling Jean-Claude Van Damme, with Like Mike, Ummet Ozcan and Charlie Sheen watching them

The song's official music video was first released on May 5, 2015, on Dimitri Vegas & Like Mike's official YouTube channel. The pictures of the set appeared on their Instagram profile with the faces of two movie stars being pixelated, which was intended to increase the tension of the fans. It turned out that the Hollywood actor Charlie Sheen and the Belgian film artist Jean-Claude Van Damme were hiding behind the censored images. On April 21, 2015, the duo posted a teaser of the music video on Facebook.

The music video received strong positive reviews because, unlike many recent videos, including many of their own, it is not a simple compilation of their live performances. It was announced to cost around $400,000. After its release, it was viewed almost 10 million times in just three months and was positively rated over 120 thousand times.

The full version has a length of 4 minutes and 44 seconds. The video was inspired by the party scenes from the movies The Hangover and Project X and it presents a crazy party organised by the DJs with Sheen and Van Damme as special guests.

== Track listing ==
Digital download (United States)
No.	Title	Length
1.	"The Hum" (Original Mix)	5:56
2.	"The Hum" (Short Edit)	3:31
3.	"The Hum" (Lost Frequencies Short Remix)	2:45
4.	"The Hum" (Lost Frequencies Extended Remix)	5:31
5.	"The Hum" (Kryder & Tom Staar Remix)	4:47

== Chart performance ==
Chart (2015–16)	Peak position
Belgium (Ultratop 50 Flanders)	1
Belgium (Ultratop 50 Wallonia)	10
France (SNEP)	60
US Hot Dance/Electronic Songs (Billboard)	39
US Dance Airplay (Billboard)	28

== Certifications ==
Region	Certification	Certified units/sales
Belgium (BRMA)	Platinum	30,000^{*}
Sweden (GLF)	Gold	20,000^{‡}
^{*} Sales figures based on certification alone.^{‡} Sales+streaming figures based on certification alone.
