= Hey Baby (Dimitri Vegas & Like Mike and Diplo song) =

Single by Dimitri Vegas & Like Mike Versus Diplo featuring Deb's Daughter
- Released: 28 October 2016
- Genre: Moombahton
- Length: 3:47 (extended mix); 3:21 (radio edit)
- Label: Smash the House; Mad Decent
- Songwriters: Dimitri Thivaios; Michael Thivaios; Thomas Wesley Pentz
- Producers: Dimitri Vegas & Like Mike; Thomas Wesley Pentz

Dimitri Vegas & Like Mike singles chronology
"Stay a While" (2016)	"Hey Baby" (2016)	"Complicated" (2017)

Diplo singles chronology
"To Ü" (2015)	"Hey Baby" (2016)	"Bang Bang" (2016)

"Hey Baby" is a song recorded by the Belgian DJ duo Dimitri Vegas & Like Mike and American producer/musician Diplo, featuring vocals from Deb's Daughter. The single gave the duo their second number one and the first for both Diplo and Deb's Daughter in the United States, where it topped the Billboard Dance Club Songs in its 29 April 2017 issue. A remix of the song, featuring American rapper Kid Ink, was later released.

== Composition ==
The single was written by Dimitri and Michael Thivaios and Thomas Wesley Pentz. The song has a instrumental influenced by Carabbian sounds and Moombahton beats combined with Electronic music.

== Music video ==
A screenshot from the music video depicting Dimitri Vegas, Diplo and Like Mike in their animated version

An animated video inspired by comics was uploaded on the duo's YouTube channel and has a total length of three minutes and sixteen seconds. It is the second video inspired by comics after Arcade. The video follows Dimitri Vegas, Like Mike and Diplo been caught in a movie where they fight with robots, dinosaurs, zombies and pirates, while been helped by a mysterious woman who gave them the tickets to the movie at the beginning of the video. Another version of the video was uploaded for the Kid Ink remix.

== Track listing ==
Digital download (United States)
No.	Title	Length
1.	"Hey Baby (Guest Ver.)" (feat. Kid Ink)	3:21
2.	"Hey Baby" (Lost Frequencies Remix)	3:19
3.	"Hey Baby" (Steve Aoki Remix)	3:25
4.	"Hey Baby" (Dimitri Vegas & Like Mike Tomorrowland Remix)	6:18
5.	"Hey Baby" (Blasterjaxx Remix)	5:40

== Charts ==
=== Weekly charts ===
Chart (2016–2017)	Peak position
Belgium (Ultratop 50 Flanders)	1
Belgium (Ultratop 50 Wallonia)	13
Germany (GfK)	65
US Dance Club Songs (Billboard)	1
US Hot Dance/Electronic Songs (Billboard)	30

=== Year-end charts ===
Chart (2016)	Position
Belgium (Ultratop Flanders)	82

Chart (2017)	Position
Belgium (Ultratop Flanders)	90
Belgium (Ultratop Wallonia)	96
US Dance Club Songs (Billboard)	14

== See also ==
- List of number-one dance singles of 2017 (U.S.)
- List of Ultratop 50 number-one singles of 2016
- List of Ultratop 50 number-one singles of 2017
