= Ghost Community =

British progressive rock band

Ghost Community was a British progressive rock band. It was formed in 2015, and was composed of John Paul Vaughan, Simon Rogers, Moray Macdonald, Jake Bradford-Sharp, and Matty Cohen.

They released one album called Cycle of Life in 2016.

In March 2019, the band announced that they were splitting up.
