= 2WEI =

German composer team

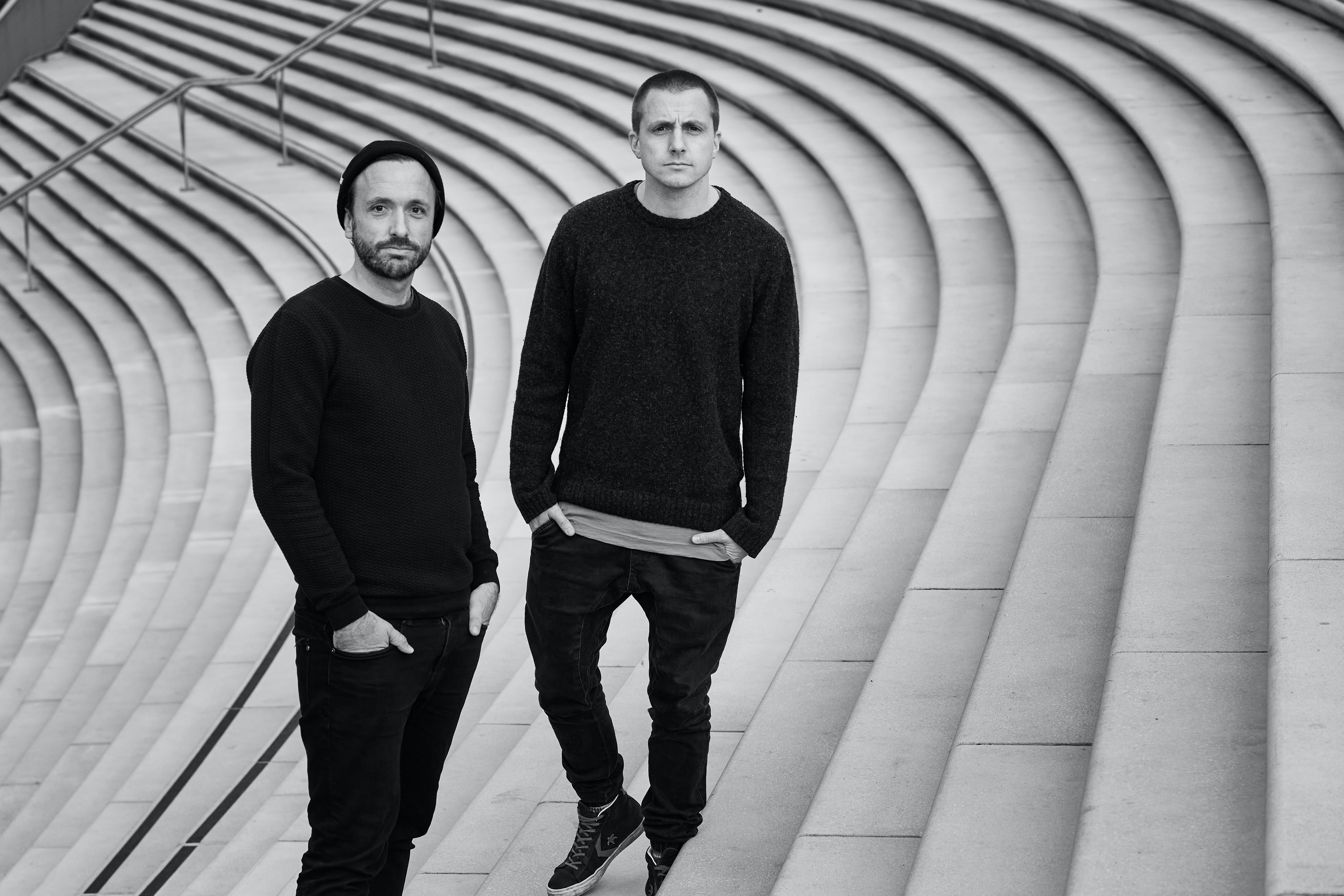
- Simon Heeger and past member Christian Vorländer

Background information
- Origin: Hamburg, Germany
- Genres: Trailer music, production music, electronic, film scores
- Years active: 2016–present
- Label: Position Music
- Members: Simon Heeger; Thomas Muis; Ruben Norg; Henning Sommer; Max Maier; Felix Wunderer; Marcel Neumann; Koray Daly
- Past members: Christian Vorländer
- Website: 2wei.audio

2WEI or 2WEI Music (from German "Zwei": "Two", the -ei being pronounced like the English letter i) is a composer team founded by Christian Vorländer and Simon Heeger in early 2016. The group is based in Hamburg, Germany. Their music has been featured in numerous movie trailers including Wonder Woman and Darkest Hour.

== Background ==
Christian Vorländer and Simon Heeger have known each other since college, after which they pursued different career paths. Vorländer began working for Hans Zimmer and Junkie XL in Los Angeles, while Heeger worked at advertising music houses like Mophonics and Yessian.

Vorländer returned to Germany in 2015, and in 2016 they joined forces and formed 2WEI, combining their skills from the advertising and film score music world.

Since then, the group has had a continuous success, licensing their tracks for various promotional campaigns. Most recently their tracks have been used in a series of animations created by YouTube user SAD-ist, based on events in the Dream SMP, a Minecraft server dedicated to improvisational role-playing. The popularity of these animations resulted in the group providing SAD-ist with an unreleased track to use specifically for her animation, as well as providing the sound design.

The composer team has had their tracks promoted to various trailer houses and music editors by Position Music, the label which they are currently working with. Soon after, their music was chosen to be featured in various major Hollywood movie trailers.

2WEI has won several awards, including a Golden Cannes Lions award for Best Composition in 2018 and Hollywood Music in Media Awards in 2024 for their composition in the game Honor of Kings.

== Licensing credits ==
=== Movie trailers ===
2WEI's music has been featured in trailers for the films Wonder Woman, Tomb Raider, Ghost in the Shell, War for the Planet of the Apes, Valerian and the City of a Thousand Planets, Darkest Hour, Mortal Engines, Les trois mousquetaires - D'artagnan, Hellboy, and Furiosa: A Mad Max Saga.

=== Game trailers ===
2WEI has composed and remixed music for trailers for many videogames, including League of Legends, Call of Duty, Battlefield, Need for Speed, Valorant, Assassin's Creed Valhalla, Apex Legends, Tiny Tina's Wonderlands, Onmyoji, Garena Free Fire, and War Thunder. On 9 January 2020, 2WEI presented, as an association with Edda Hayes and Blur Studio, a version of the song Warriors by Imagine Dragons, as the soundtrack of the music video to promote the 2020 season of League of Legends. On May 24, 2023, the track "Echoes" was used for the PlayStation Showcase final trailer, concluding the presentation.

=== Advertising ===
2WEI's music has been featured in ads for Lufthansa, Audi, Mercedes, FILA, Samsung, Facebook, BMW, Calgary Flames, and more. In 2018 they were awarded with the Golden Lion in Cannes for the best composition.

Television

Gangsta's Paradise, from the 2017 album "Escape Velocity", was featured on the intro to "The Finale Performances" (season 19, episode 19) of America's Got Talent.

=== Discography ===
- 2017: 2WEI — "Escape Velocity"
- 2018: 2WEI — "Sequels"
- 2019: Dimitri Vegas & Like Mike, Bassjackers and 2WEI — "Mortal Kombat (Anthem)"
- 2020: League of Legends, 2WEI and Edda Hayes — "Warriors"
- 2020: 2WEI feat. Ali Christenhusz — "Emergence"
- 2021: 2WEI, Edda Hayes — "Pandora"
- 2021: 2WEI, Edda Hayes — "Burn"
- 2021: 2WEI — "Kill The Crown"
- 2021: 2WEI, Schepetkov — "Shape of My Heart"
- 2021: 2WEI and Edda Hayes — "Blindside"
- 2021: 2WEI, Edda Hayes and Ali Christenhusz — "What a Wonderful World"
- 2021: VALORANT, 2WEI feat. Ali Christenhusz — "KAY/O"
- 2021: Onmyoji, 2WEI feat. Elena Westermann — "Broken Hero"
- 2022: Onmyoji, 2WEI feat. Elena Westermann — "Internal Burn"
- 2022: 2WEI, Tommee Profitt, Fleurie — "Mad World"
- 2022: League of Legends, 2WEI and Edda Hayes — "The Call"
- 2022: 2WEI, Schepetkov — "Taina"
- 2022: Tumult Kollektiv, 2WEI, Alan McDermott — Destruction AllStars (Original Video Game Soundtrack)
- 2023: 2WEI, Riot Forge, League of Legends, and Ali Christenhusz — "Lightbringer"
- 2023: Onmyoji, 2WEI feat. Elena Westermann — "Cycle of Life"
- 2024: League of Legends, 2WEI, Forts, Tiffany Aris — "Still Here"
- 2024: 2WEI — "Wellerman Sea Shanty (Skull and Bones Version)"
- 2024: 2WEI — Unreal Tournament - from "Unreal Tournament: Xan" Secret Level

== See also ==
- Trailer music
- Film score
- Music in advertising
