= Complicated (Dimitri Vegas & Like Mike and David Guetta song) =

Single by Dimitri Vegas & Like Mike vs David Guetta featuring Kiiara
- Released: 28 July 2017
- Length: 3:04
- Label: Smash the House; Epic; Sony
- Composers: Angemi Antonino; David Guetta; Dimitri Thivaios; Michael Thivaios
- Lyricists: Hailey Collier; Peter Hanna; Kiara Saulters; Ethan Roberts
- Producers: David Guetta; Dimitri Vegas & Like Mike

Dimitri Vegas & Like Mike singles chronology
"Hey Baby" (2016)	"Complicated" (2017)	"Crowd Control" (2017)

David Guetta singles chronology
"Versace on the Floor" (remix) (2017)	"Complicated" (2017)	"Dirty Sexy Money" (2017)

Kiiara singles chronology
"Whippin" (2017)	"Complicated" (2017)	"Wishlist" (2017)

Music video
- "Complicated" on YouTube

"Complicated" is a song by Belgian DJ and record producer duo Dimitri Vegas & Like Mike and French DJ and record producer David Guetta, featuring American singer-songwriter Kiiara. It was composed and produced by Angemi Antonino, David Guetta and Dimitri Vegas & Like Mike, with lyrics written by Hailey Collier, Peter Hanna, Kiiara and Ethan Roberts. The song was released on 28 July 2017 via Smash the House.

== Background ==
On 14 July 2017, Dimitri Vegas posted a photo of himself and David Guetta, captioned "Big things coming". On 23 July 2017, Dimitri Vegas & Like Mike and David Guetta made their live performance debut of the song in Ibiza. On 25 July 2017, the duo shared a teaser via Epic Amsterdam, revealing the track's details and release date.

== Critical reception ==
The song is described as an "irrefutably stylistic party anthem track that is sure to make a statement on the charts". Kat Bein of Billboard wrote that the song has "straightforward melodies, easy beats, and a good, clear vocal", and felt that there is "nothing flashy about this future bass drop". Jeffrey Yau of Your EDM thinks that the track "seemingly strikes the perfect balance between summer festival jam and infectious radio hit that'll easily stick in your head with its sugary-sweet lyrics and very simple chorus", "all three artists' sounds and styles" are well blended, and "the melodies in the track are memorable enough to keep the tune in your head for a full day or more". Erik of EDM Sauce wrote that the song "is not something groundbreaking" but "is honestly pretty good" and is "catchy and fun". He described the vocals as "electrifying" and the drop as "minimalist".

== Music video ==
A screenshot from the music video depicting Dimitri Vegas & Like Mike staying on the top of cobble-stone city and watching over the town

The music video was released on 21 August 2017. It was set in Ibiza and directed by Phillip R Lopez. The video depicts the Ibiza's landscapes with dancers. Kiiara can be seen wandering outdoors on cobble-stone city streets of Ibiza Town with Dimitri Vegas & Like Mike staying on the top of the stone and watching over the town before leaving and walking on place with colored smoke in the night at the end of the video. David Guetta is absent in the video.

== Track listing ==
Digital download
No.	Title	Length
1.	"Complicated" (featuring Kiiara; Dimitri Vegas & Like Mike vs. David Guetta)	3:04

Digital download – The Remixes Part 1
No.	Title	Length
1.	"Complicated" (featuring Kiiara; R3hab remix)	2:28
2.	"Complicated" (featuring Kiiara; Tom Zanetti remix)	4:36
3.	"Complicated" (featuring Kiiara; Diego Miranda & Wolfpack remix)	4:10
4.	"Complicated" (featuring Kiiara; It's Different remix)	2:33

Digital download – The Remixes Part 2
No.	Title	Length
1.	"Complicated" (featuring Kiiara; Robin Schulz remix)	4:49
2.	"Complicated" (featuring Kiiara; Fareoh remix)	2:57
3.	"Complicated" (featuring Kiiara; Brennan Heart remix)	3:25

== Credits and personnel ==
Credits adapted from Tidal.

- Dimitri Vegas & Like Mike – composition, production
- David Guetta – composition, production
- Kiiara – lyrics
- Angemi Antonino – composition, engineering
- Hailey Collier – lyrics
- Peter Hanna – lyrics
- Ethan Roberts – lyrics
- Miles Walker – mix engineering
- Andrew Bolooki – vocal production

== Charts ==
=== Weekly charts ===
Chart (2017)	Peak position
Austria (Ö3 Austria Top 40)	51
Belgium (Ultratop 50 Flanders)	4
Belgium Dance (Ultratop Flanders)	1
Belgium (Ultratop 50 Wallonia)	6
Belgium Dance (Ultratop Wallonia)	2
Czech Republic Singles Digital (ČNS IFPI)	96
Germany (GfK)	77
Netherlands (Dutch Top 40)	22
Netherlands (Mega Top 50)	34
Netherlands (Single Top 100)	53
Slovakia Singles Digital (ČNS IFPI)	68
Sweden (Sverigetopplistan)	44
Switzerland (Schweizer Hitparade)	37
US Dance Club Songs (Billboard)	1
US Hot Dance/Electronic Songs (Billboard)	22

=== Year-end charts ===
Chart (2017)	Position
Belgium (Ultratop Flanders)	39
Chart (2018)	Position
US Dance Club Songs (Billboard)	31

== Certifications ==
Region	Certification	Certified units/sales
Belgium (BRMA)	Platinum	20,000^{‡}
Germany (BVMI)	Gold	200,000^{‡}
Netherlands (NVPI)	Platinum	40,000^{‡}
Sweden (GLF)	Gold	20,000^{‡}
^{‡} Sales+streaming figures based on certification alone.
