= Higher Place =

Single by Dimitri Vegas & Like Mike featuring Ne-Yo
- Released: 15 August 2015
- Genre: Deep house
- Length: 4:24 (original mix); 2:54 (radio edit)
- Label: Smash the House; Motown; Capitol
- Songwriters: Dimitri Thivaios; Michael Thivaios; Shaffer Smith
- Producers: Dimitri Vegas & Like Mike

Dimitri Vegas & Like Mike singles chronology
"The Hum" (2015)	"Higher Place" (2015)	"Arcade" (2016)

Ne-Yo singles chronology
"Coming with You" (2015)	"Higher Place" (2015)	"Another Love Song" (2017)

"Higher Place" is a song by Belgian DJ duo Dimitri Vegas & Like Mike, featuring vocals from American singer Ne-Yo, who co-wrote the lyrics with Dimitri Thivaios. Like Mike also provides vocals for the song's chorus. The single gave the duo their first number one in the United States, where it topped the Billboard Dance Club Songs chart in its 6 January 2016 issue.

== Music video ==
A music video for the single was uploaded on the duo's YouTube channel at a total length of two minutes and fifty-three seconds. The video follows a group of friends traveling through the desert, interspersed with scenes of Like Mike and Ne-Yo singing, while Dimitri Vegas is seen working at an old gas station and appears to have supernatural powers.

== Track listing ==
Digital download (Belgium)
No.	Title	Length
1.	"Higher Place" (Radio Edit)	2:54
2.	"Higher Place" (Instrumental)	4:25
3.	"Higher Place" (A cappella)	2:54

Digital download (United States)
No.	Title	Length
1.	"Higher Place" (Afrojack Remix)	3:15
2.	"Higher Place" (Bassjackers Remix)	4:48
3.	"Higher Place" (Regi & Wolfpack Radio Edit)	2:40
4.	"Higher Place" (Dante Klein Remix)	5:13
5.	"Higher Place" (Andrew Rayel Remix)	4:56
6.	"Higher Place" (Filterheadz Remix)	6:39
7.	"Higher Place" (Angemi Radio Edit Mix)	4:16
8.	"Higher Place" (Extended Mix)	4:24

== Chart performance ==
=== Weekly charts ===
Chart (2015–16)	Peak position
Belgium (Ultratop 50 Flanders)	1
Belgium (Ultratop 50 Wallonia)	22
Czech Republic Airplay (ČNS IFPI)	15
France (SNEP)	131
Japan Hot 100 (Billboard)	15
Poland (Video Chart)	3
US Dance Club Songs (Billboard)	1
US Hot Dance/Electronic Songs (Billboard)	18
US Dance Airplay (Billboard)	14

=== Year-end charts ===
Chart (2015)	Position
Belgium (Ultratop Flanders)	10
Chart (2016)	Position
US Dance Club Songs (Billboard)	13
US Hot Dance/Electronic Songs (Billboard)	66

== Certifications ==
Region	Certification	Certified units/sales
Belgium (BRMA)	Platinum	20,000^{‡}
New Zealand (RMNZ)	Gold	7,500^{*}
^{*} Sales figures based on certification alone.^{‡} Sales+streaming figures based on certification alone.

== See also ==
- List of Billboard number-one dance songs of 2016
