= Afro Bros =

DJ and record production duo from Arnhem, Netherlands

- Born: Giordano Ashruf & Rashid Badloe
- Origin: Arnhem, Netherlands
- Genres: Dance, Latin, house, reggaeton
- Occupations: DJs, producers
- Instruments: Keyboards
- Years active: 2006–present
- Members: Giordano Ashruf; Rashid Badloe
- Website: afro-bros.com

Afro Bros is the stage name of Giordano Ashruf and Rashid Badloe, an Afro-Dutch DJ and record production duo. Notable productions include the songs "X" and "Instagram".

== Career ==
In 2017, Afro Bros collaborated with Boaz van de Beatz and Ronnie Flex, and produced two songs, "Energie" and "Come Again" which later received a Buma Award.

Afro Bros co-produced the song "Sua Cara" with Major Lazer, and it later won a Latin Grammy Award.

In 2018, Afro Bros collaborated with Jeon, and produced the track "X", featuring Nicky Jam and J Balvin which has been viewed 1.9 billion times on YouTube and also won a Buma Export Award as well as being nominated for Latin Grammy Awards.

In July 2019, the duo produced the song "Instagram" with Dimitri Vegas & Like Mike, David Guetta, Daddy Yankee and Natti Natasha. In 2019, they also worked with Jamaican singer Sean Kingston and released the song "How Many Times".

Afro Bros signed a contract with Universal Music Group in 2020.

== Discography ==
=== Singles ===
Song	Year	Artist	Reference
"18 Plus"	2016	Finest Sno	
"Kijken Mag"	2018	Supergaande	
"Push"	2018	Finest Sno, Kalibwoy & Darr3n	
"How Many Times"	2018	Sean Kingston	
"Instagram"	2019	Daddy Yankee, David Guetta, Natti Natasha and Dimitri Vegas & Like Mike	
"Shaka Bum"	2022	Afro Bros, MC Fioti, Omar Montes, Oryane	
"She Knows"	2023	Dimitri Vegas & Like Mike and David Guetta featuring Akon	
"Runaway"	2025	Afro Bros & Oryane	

=== Production ===
Song	Year	Artist	Ref.
Sua Cara	2017	Major Lazer, Anitta, Pabllo Vittar	
Energie	2017	Ronnie Flex, Frenna	
Come again	2017	Ronnie Flex, Boef	
So Much Love	2018	Charly Black	
X (Enguis)	2018	Nicky Jam & J Balvin	
Dame tu Cosita	2018	Pitbull & Karol G	
Instagram	2019	Dimitri Vegas & Like Mike & David Guetta, Daddy Yankee, Natti Natasha	
How Many Times	2019	Sean Kingston	
Runaway	2025	Afro Bros & Oryane	

== Awards ==
Year	Award	Song	Category	Ref.
2018	Buma Award	Come Again	Best collaboration	
2018	Buma Award	Energie	Best urban song	
2019	Buma Award	X	Best international song	
2020	Latin Grammy Awards	Amarillo	Best Urban Album	
