= Instagram (2019 song) =

2019 single by multiple artists

Single by Dimitri Vegas & Like Mike, David Guetta, Daddy Yankee, Afro Bros, and Natti Natasha
- Language: English; Spanish
- Released: 5 July 2019
- Recorded: 2018
- Genre: Dance
- Length: 3:04
- Label: Smash the House
- Songwriters: David Guetta; Francesca Richard; Dimitri Thivaios; Michael Thivaios; Ramon Luis Ayala Rodriguez; Giordano M.S. Ashruf; Natalia Alexandra Gutierrez Batista; Rashid M.S. M Badloe; Sharef M.R. Badloe
- Producers: Dimitri Vegas & Like Mike; David Guetta; Afro Bros

Dimitri Vegas & Like Mike singles chronology
"Untz Untz" (2019)	"Instagram" (2019)	"Turn It Up" (2019)

David Guetta singles chronology
"Stay (Don't Go Away)" (2019)	"Instagram" (2019)	"Thing for You" (2019)

Daddy Yankee singles chronology
"Si Supieras" (2019)	"Instagram" (2019)	"China" (2019)

Afro Bros singles chronology
"How Many Times" (2019)	"Instagram" (2019)	"She Knows" (2023)

Natti Natasha singles chronology
"Runaway" (2019)	"Instagram" (2019)	"Viene y Va" (2020)

"Instagram" is a song by Belgian production duo Dimitri Vegas & Like Mike, French DJ David Guetta, Puerto Rican rapper Daddy Yankee, Dutch DJ duo Afro Bros, and Dominican singer Natti Natasha. It was released as a single on 5 July 2019 by Smash the House. The song is about the popular social media app of the same name as the song. The single reached Top 10 in Belgium and Netherlands and the most popular single of Dimitri Vegas and Like Mike on Shazam.

== Background ==
On 18 June 2019, Natti Natasha and Daddy Yankee announced the song on their social media by posting photos from the video set in Ibiza, Spain. Natasha also posted a video thanking the artists, calling it an "amazing moment".

== Composition ==
The song was written by David Guetta, Francesca Richard, Dimitri Thivaios, Michael Thivaios, Ramon Luis Ayala Rodriguez, Giordano M.S. Ashruf, Natalia Alexandra Gutierrez Batista, Rashid M.S. M Badloe and Sharef M.R. Badloe, while Dimitri Vegas & Like Mike, David Guetta and Afro Bros produced the single.

The single has verses in English and Spanish about Instagram and the fame on this social media platform, having also a reference at Peter Pan. The instrumental has influences of Reggaeton. The single is one of few explicit songs of Dimitri Vegas & Like Mike.

== Music video ==
A screenshot from the music video depicting Dimitri Vegas, Daddy Yankee, Natti Natasha, David Guetta and Like Mike taking a selfie at a party

A music video to accompany the release of "Instagram" was first released onto YouTube on 5 July 2019 at a total length of three minutes and thirty-six seconds. It was filmed in Ibiza.The video presents the DJs, Natasha and Daddy Yankee at a party in Ibiza, while they use the Instagram app and making together a selfie.

== Charts ==
=== Weekly charts ===
Chart (2019–2020)	Peak position
Austria (Ö3 Austria Top 40)	42
Belgium (Ultratop 50 Flanders)	7
Belgium (Ultratop 50 Wallonia)	24
Colombia (National-Report)	79
France (SNEP)	104
Germany (GfK)	29
Netherlands (Dutch Top 40)	5
Netherlands (Single Top 100)	6
New Zealand Hot Singles (RMNZ)	28
Poland Airplay (ZPAV)	30
Portugal (AFP)	95
Romania (Airplay 100)	16
Slovakia Airplay (ČNS IFPI)	37
Slovakia Singles Digital (ČNS IFPI)	52
Sweden (Sverigetopplistan)	99
Switzerland (Schweizer Hitparade)	53
US Hot Dance/Electronic Songs (Billboard)	23

=== Year-end charts ===
Chart (2019)	Position
Belgium (Ultratop Flanders)	31
Netherlands (Dutch Top 40)	38
Netherlands (Single Top 100)	33
Romania (Airplay 100)	94
US Hot Dance/Electronic Songs (Billboard)	78

Chart (2020)	Position
Belgium (Ultratop Flanders)	86
Romania (Airplay 100)	52

== Certifications ==
Region	Certification	Certified units/sales
Belgium (BRMA)	2× Platinum	40,000^{‡}
France (SNEP)	Gold	100,000^{‡}
Germany (BVMI)	Gold	200,000^{‡}
Italy (FIMI)	Gold	35,000^{‡}
Mexico (AMPROFON)	Platinum	60,000^{‡}
Poland (ZPAV)	Platinum	20,000^{‡}
Portugal (AFP)	Gold	5,000^{‡}
Spain (Promusicae)	Platinum	60,000^{‡}
Switzerland (IFPI Switzerland)	Gold	10,000^{‡}
^{‡} Sales+streaming figures based on certification alone.
