= Dimitri Vegas & Like Mike =

Belgian DJ duo

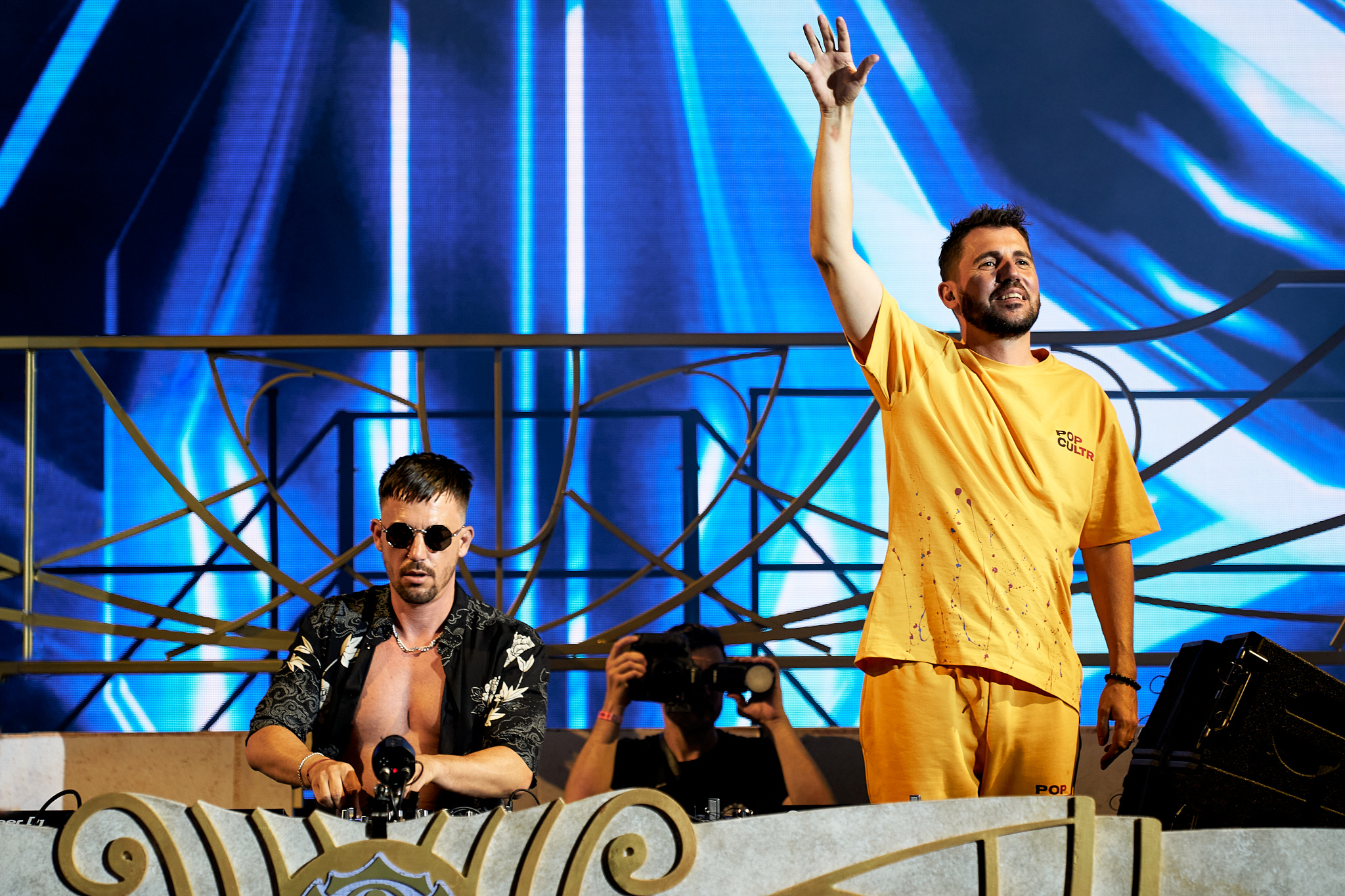
- Dimitri Vegas & Like Mike performing at Tomorrowland in 2022

Background information
- Also known as: MobNoiz, NoiseFreak, TerraPlastik, Dnm
- Origin: Willebroek, Belgium
- Genres: Electro house; big room house; trap; Dutch house; future house
- Occupation: DJs
- Instruments: Keyboards; mixer; synthesizer
- Years active: 2008–present
- Labels: Smash the House; Spinnin Records; Armada Music; Epic Amsterdam; Orchard; Sony
- Members: Dimitri Thivaios (Dimitri Vegas); Michael Thivaios (Like Mike)

Dimitri Vegas & Like Mike are a Belgian DJ duo composed of brothers Dimitri and Michael Thivaios. They were ranked No. 1 on DJ Mag's Top 100 DJs list in 2015 and 2019, and No. 2 in 2014, 2016 through 2018, 2020 and 2023.

They have performed at numerous festivals worldwide such as EXIT Festival, Electric Daisy Carnival, Electric Zoo, Parookaville, UNTOLD Festival, VIBE Fesztivál, Creamfields, Tomorrowland and SunBurn Music Festival, where they have been the official resident DJs since 2010. They have held summer DJ residencies in Ibiza at Amnesia (2014-2016) and more recently Ushuaïa Ibiza (2017 to present).

They run the record label Smash the House which was founded in 2010, and have collaborated with artists that include Afrojack, Armin van Buuren, Daddy Yankee, David Guetta, Era Istrefi, Fatboy Slim, Gucci Mane, Hardwell, Martin Garrix, Paris Hilton, Steve Angello, Sebastian Yatra, Kid Ink and Nmixx, and have remixed artists such as Lady Gaga, the Chainsmokers and (G)I-dle.

== History ==
=== Pre–2009: Early life and career ===
Known by their stage names, Dimitri Vegas (Dimitri Thivaios) and Like Mike (Michael Thivaios) were born on 16 May 1982 (age 44) and 3 December 1985 (age 40) respectively, in Belgium. Dimitri and Michael Thivaios are of Greek origin. The brothers grew up in the Flemish municipality of Willebroek. They began to make their first steps as DJs reportedly at a young age. Very quickly, they made several appearances in small clubs and were resident BeatFM radio DJs. Dimitri then left Belgium in 1999 and began touring Europe. He lived in Mallorca and then in Halkidiki, Greece, before moving to Ibiza in 2003, where he was a resident in major clubs such as Privilege and Space.

=== 2009–present: Breakthrough and success ===
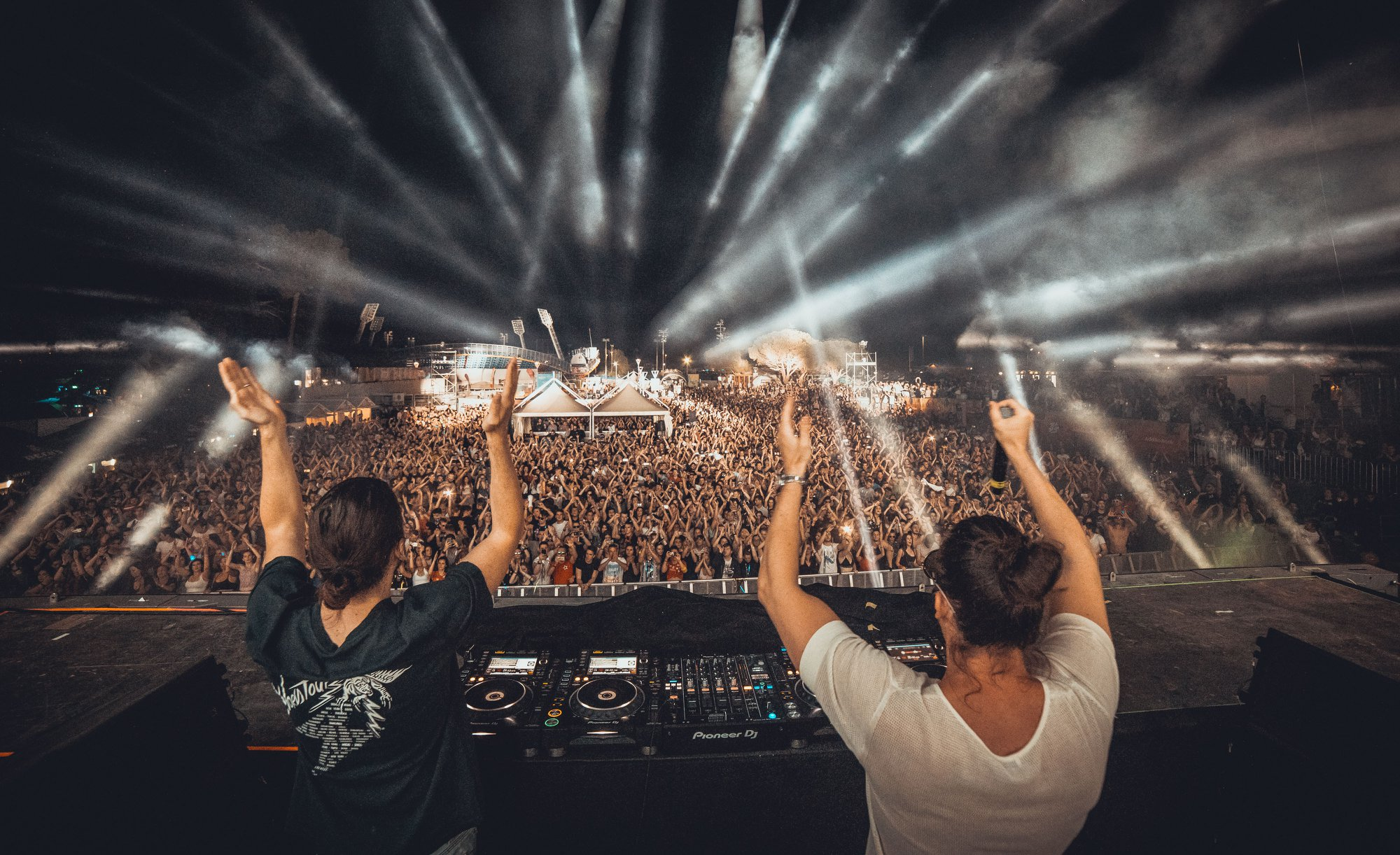
Dimitri Vegas & Like Mike performing at Sea Star Festival 2018

Dimitri Vegas & Like Mike released their first single in 2009, "Liquid Skies" under the alias Dnm. In 2010, after founding their own record label Smash the House, they were tasked with writing the official anthem for the 2010 edition of Tomorrowland, "Tomorrow (Give in to the Night)". This song was their first top 20 hit, peaking at number 16 in Belgium. The duo continued to write the Tomorrowland anthems up to the 2014 edition, this included the 2013 anthem "Chattahoochee" which peaked at number two in the Belgian charts. 2014 also saw the release of "Tremor" with Dutch DJ Martin Garrix which, in 2018, Billboard named their best song.

In May 2015, Dimitri Vegas & Like Mike scored their first Belgian number one with "The Hum" with Dutch dj Ummet Ozcan. Charlie Sheen and Jean-Claude Van Damme starred in the song's official music video. "The Hum" was quickly followed by the release of "Higher Place" (featuring Ne-Yo) which also peaked at number one in Belgium, both songs also certified platinum in the duo's home country. At Amsterdam Dance Event 2015, the duo were voted as the world's number one DJ, by DJ Magazine, being the first Belgians to do so. 2016 saw the group's third number one and platinum single with "Hey Baby". and they finished runners-up in DJ Mag's top 100 DJ poll behind Martin Garrix.

2017 saw the release of their platinum selling single "Complicated", certifying in both Belgium and The Netherlands, in addition to their long-awaited festivals gimmick "Crowd Control". They also released a rendition of "He's a Pirate" with Hans Zimmer for the Pirates of the Caribbean: Dead Men Tell No Tales movie that same year. At Tomorrowland, the duo debuted their "Garden of Madness" stage at the festival which has been a part of the event ever since.

On 22 June 2018, Dimitri Vegas & Like Mike released the single "When I Grow Up", with American rapper Wiz Khalifa. The music video for "When I Grow Up" was directed by Belgian directors Adil El Arbi and Bilall Fallah, who had recently cast Dimitri & Mike for an acting role in their Belgian movie Gangsta. On 28 September the duo released the song "Bounce" featuring Bassjackers, Julian Banks and Snoop Dogg.

On 15 February 2019, Dimitri Vegas & Like Mike and Era Istrefi released "Selfish" which achieved the number one position on the Billboard Dance Chart. On 10 May 2019, Dimitri & Mike released their song "Best Friends Ass" with Paris Hilton. The music video for the single featured a number of known personalities including YouTubers Nikita Dragun, Vitaly Zdorovetskiy and Juanpa Zurita, singer-songwriter Chester Lockhart, former UFC fighter Chuck Liddell and Kim Kardashian. Later in 2019, they achieved their first 2× platinum single with "Instagram", a collaboration with David Guetta, Daddy Yankee, Afro Bros and Natti Natasha. In addition to this, after three years in second place, Dimitri Vegas & Like Mike reclaimed their place as world's No.1 DJs in the DJ Mag Top 100 DJs Poll. The brothers closed the decade with a collaboration with Sebastian Yatra, Afro Bros, Camilo and Emilia on ‘Boomshakalaka’.

On 5 February 2021, Dimitri Vegas & Like Mike released a remixed version of "Hwaa" by (G)I-dle, a South Korean kpop girl group.

On 24 July 2020, Dimitri Vegas & Like Mike along with DJ Regard released a dance cover of Destiny's Child "Say My Name". The following day the duo played the closing set for the first virtual festival held by Tomorrowland. The event named "Tomorrowland Around the World" took place on 25 July and 26 July as a replacement for the usual festival which was cancelled due to the COVID-19 pandemic.

In August 2021, the duo collabed with mobile battle royale game "Garena Free Fire", under the collab game has released playable characters based on the duo in-game, official announcement was made by Garena Free Fire's official social media handles on 4 August 2021.

Dimitri Vegas & Like Mike had also previously released track for in-game event "Rampage" of Garena Free Fire in July 2021. On 20 August 2021, Dimitri Vegas & Like Mike along with Alok and KSHMR released collaboration song for the Garena Free Fire's 4th anniversary.

On 3 March 2023, the duo released their second collaboration with Ne-Yo, "Mexico", along the Mexican singer Danna Paola. In July 2023, the duo announced the forthcoming release of their debut studio album Rewind + Repeat, which will feature the single "She Knows" with David Guetta, Afro Bros and Akon. In August 2023 at Tomorrowland (festival), it was announced that Vegas would appear in the video game Hitman III as an Elusive Target (a special one time event that players only have one shot at completing), portraying a successful DJ named Alexios Laskaridis. Taking place in the Berlin level, "The Drop" would be available from October 27th to November 27th. The Drop would return from September 12th to October 14th 2024 and again from March 13th to April 6th 2025. Additionally on March 22nd, 2024, The Drop would become available in the Elusive Target Arcade Mode under the name The Base by purchasing The Drop DLC Pack. Along with The Base players would receive a variety of DJ inspired items.

On 1 December 2023, the duo released the awaited single Thank You (Not So Bad), a remake of the song Thank You, in collaboration with Tiesto, W&W and Dido.

== "3 Are Legend" project ==
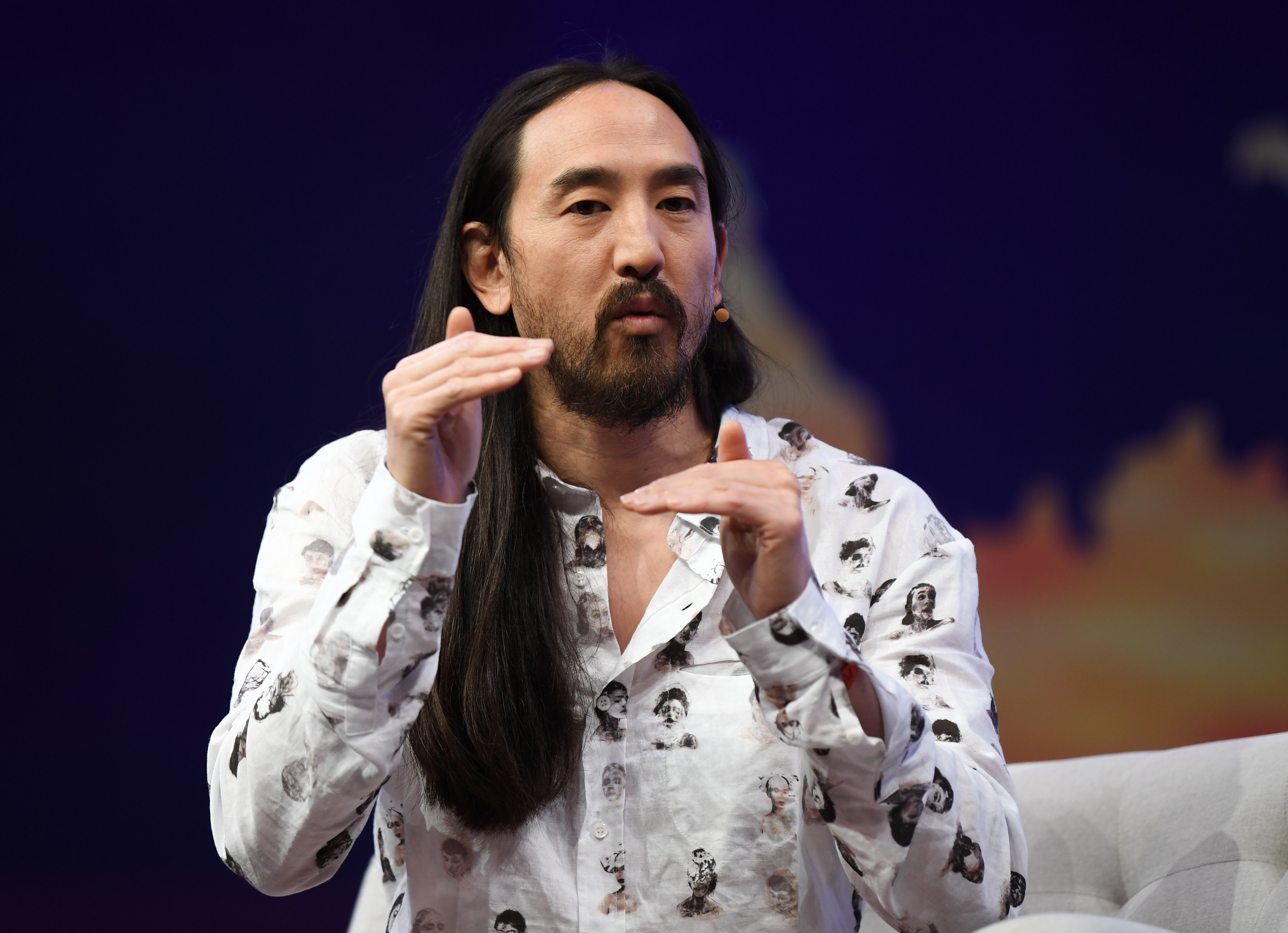
American DJ Steve Aoki is the third member of the "3 Are Legend" project

3 Are Legend is a supergroup consisting of Dimitri Vegas & Like Mike and American DJ Steve Aoki. The trio have performed together at several music festivals such as TomorrowWorld, Tomorrowland, Creamfields, Ultra Music Festival and Untold. They officially first performed under the 3 Are Legend alias at the 2014 edition of Ultra Music Festival.

== Personal lives ==
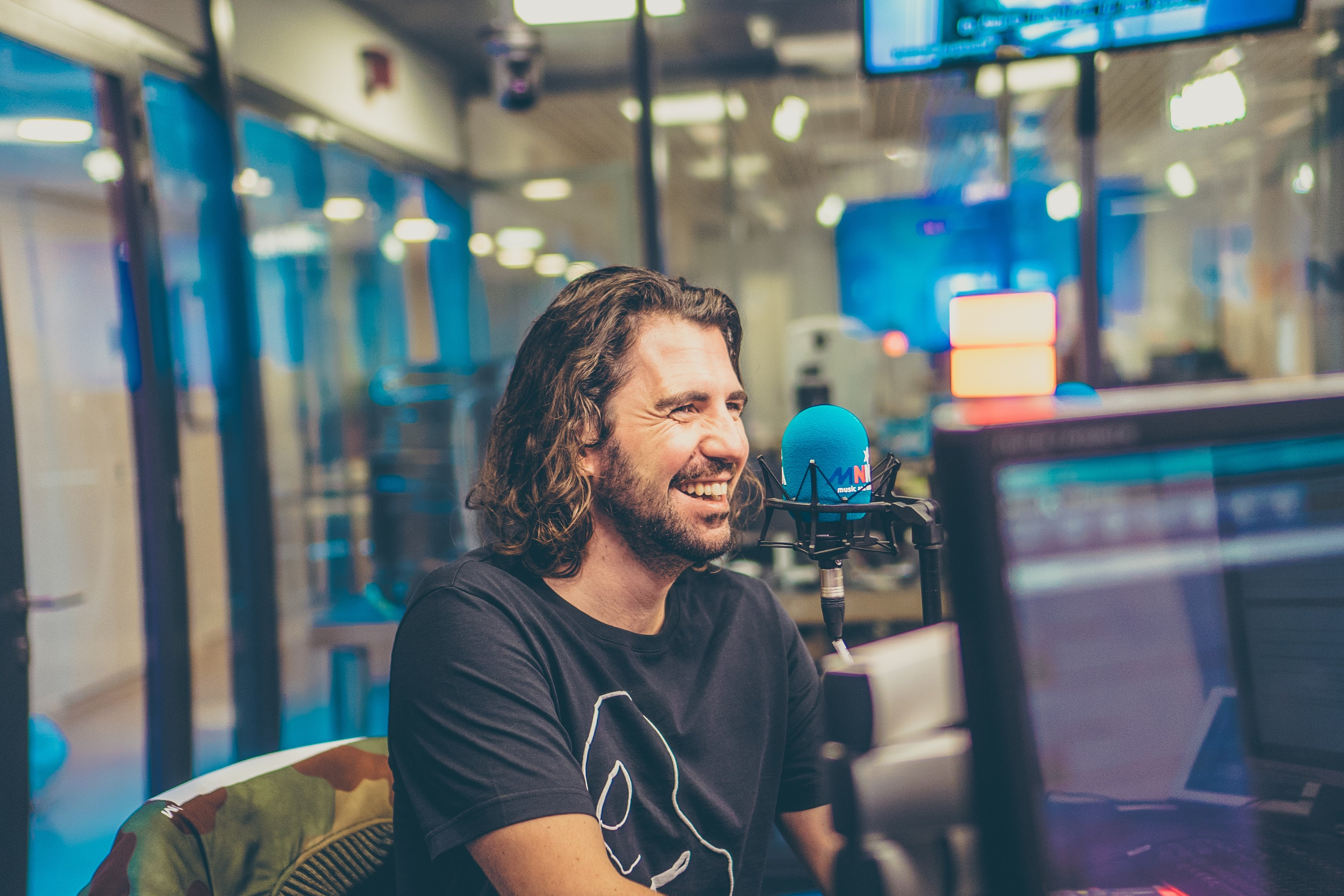
Dimitri Vegas in the MNM radio studio, 2018

Dimitri Vegas is a big comic book fan and owns a large collection, with his favourite being the Spider-Man series. In 2017, Dimitri married Belgian-born DJ and producer Mattn in Ibiza. In 2021 the couple had a son named London Thivaios. Vegas has also appeared in several feature films that include Jurassic World: Dominion, The Bouncer, Men in Black: International, Rambo: Last Blood, Yummy, H4Z4RD and It's a Wonderful Knife.

Like Mike, in addition to his music career, also writes, produces and raps under the same name. In February 2020 Mike announced the launch of his own record label Green Room for his solo music projects. Also, he releases singles under the alter-ego Hereon, a project dedicated for Melodic Techno genre in collaboration with Tomorrowland Music. The first album of this project will be released in 2024. He is in a relationship with Gemma Winterrose of 3 years.

For a tour of Scandinavia in 2020, the duo used BMW M8 Competition Gran Coupés as their tour vehicles as part of a promotional endeavour with the car company.

== Concert tours ==
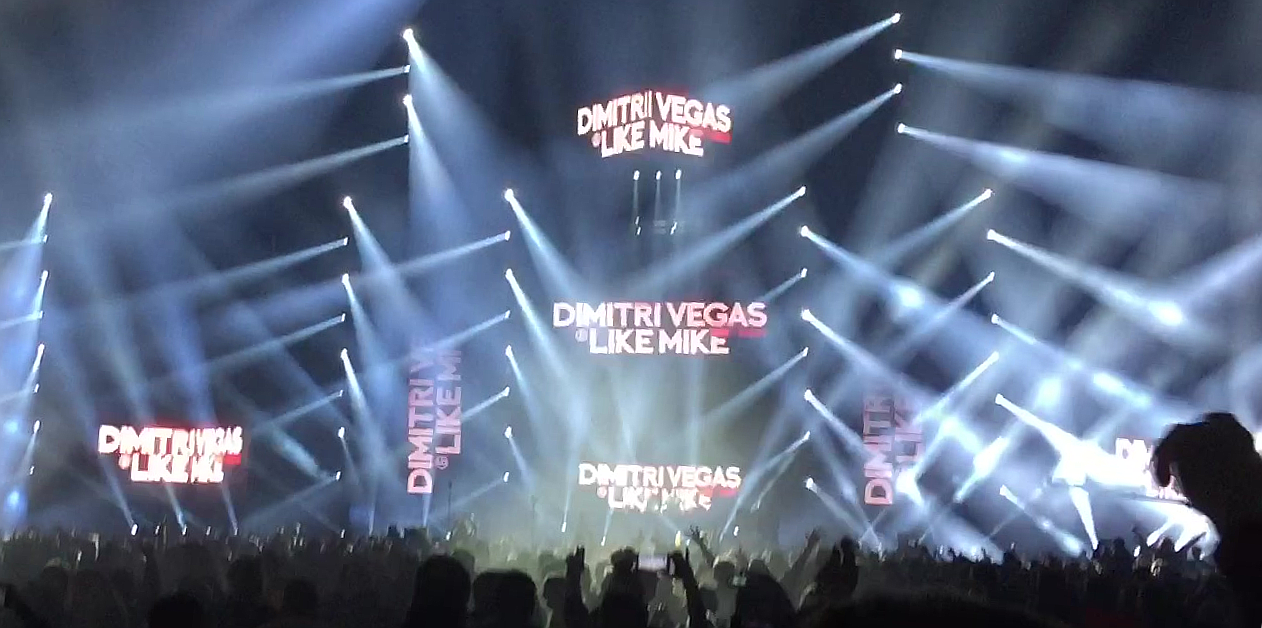
A Dimitri Vegas & Like Mike concert at the Veltins Arena in Germany

On 19 and 20 December 2014, Dimitri Vegas & Like Mike hosted their first concert at Antwerp's Sportpaleis with the event concept "Bringing the World the Madness", which saw 40,000 fans joining them over the two day event. The following year they announced the 2016 edition of the arena show at Antwerp's Sportpaleis increasing the run of dates to four nights (16, 17, 18, 19 December). Tomorrowland founder Michiel Beers The duo's manager, Nick Royaards, help produce and manage the annual event concepts, with Tomorrowland providing production behind all of the shows.

In November 2016, Dimitri Vegas & Like Mike played a "Bringing Germany the Madness" concert, in association with World Club Dome Winter Edition show, at the Veltins Arena in Gelsenkirchen, Germany. The concert entered the German history books following a record-breaking show that saw Dimitri Vegas & Like Mike play to a crowd of 45,000 people — the biggest solo DJ show in Germany ever.

For 2019, Vegas & Mike rebranded their annual concert at Antwerp's Sportpaleis as "Tomorrowland Presents Garden of Madness". The line-up for the 2019 edition featured guests DJs Armin van Buuren, Netsky, Nicky Romero and Lil Kleine. In the build up to the homecoming show in Belgium, Vegas & Mike also toured the Garden of Madness show in Liverpool and New York.

== Awards and nominations ==
=== DJ Awards ===
Year	Category	Work	Outcome	Ref.
2014	Best Electro House DJ	—N/a	Nominated	
2015	Best Electro/Progressive House DJ	—N/a	Nominated	
2015	Best International DJ	—N/a	Nominated	
2016	Best Big Room House DJ	—N/a	Nominated	
2016	Best International DJ	—N/a	Nominated	
2017	Best Big Room House DJ	—N/a	Nominated	

=== DJ Magazine top 100 DJs ===
Year	Position	Notes	Ref.
2011	79	New Entry	
2012	38	Up 41	
2013	6	Up 32	
2014	2	Up 4	
2015	1	Up 1	
2016	2	Down 1	
2017	2	No Change	
2018	2	No Change	
2019	1	Up 1	
2020	2	Down 1	
2021	5	Down 3	
2022	3	Up 2	
2023	2	Up 1	
2024	3	Down 1	
2025	4	Down 1	

==== Pre-2016 ====
Year	Category	Work	Outcome	Ref.
2013	Best Breakthrough DJ	—N/a	Won	
2014	Best European DJ	—N/a	Won	
2014	Best Group	—N/a	Won	
2015	Best European DJ	—N/a	Won	
2015	Best Group	—N/a	Nominated	
2016	Best R&B/Urban Dance Track	"Higher Place"	Nominated	
2016	Best Electro/Progressive House Track	"Higher Place"	Nominated	
2016	Best Electro/Progressive House Track	"The Hum"	Nominated	
2016	Best European DJ	—N/a	Won	
2016	Best Group	—N/a	Won	

==== 2018–present ====
(Note: No award ceremony was held in 2017. In 2018 winners were chosen by the Winter Music Conference themselves. 2019 marks the first year of public voting since the Winter Music Conference's restructure.)

Year	Category	Work	Result	Ref.
2020	Best Male (Dance / Electronic)	—N/a	Won	

=== MTV Europe Music Awards ===
Year	Category	Work	Outcome	Ref.
2014	Best Belgian Act	Dmitri Vegas & Like Mike	Won	
2015	Best Belgian Act	Dmitri Vegas & Like Mike	Won	
2018	Best Belgian Act	Dmitri Vegas & Like Mike	Won	

=== NRJ Music Awards ===
Year	Category	Work	Outcome	Ref.
2016	Best Collaboration of the Year	—N/a	Nominated	
2016	DJ Award D'Honneur	—N/a	Won	

=== WDM Radio Awards ===
Year	Category	Work	Outcome	Ref.
2017	Best Party DJ	—N/a	Nominated	
2018	Best Bass Track	"Complicated"	Nominated	

=== YouTube Creator Awards ===
- Dimitri Vegas & Like Mike
  (5.5 million subscribers - Feb 2023)

== See also ==
- Smash the House
- Tomorrowland
