= Bassjackers =

Dutch music production and DJ duo

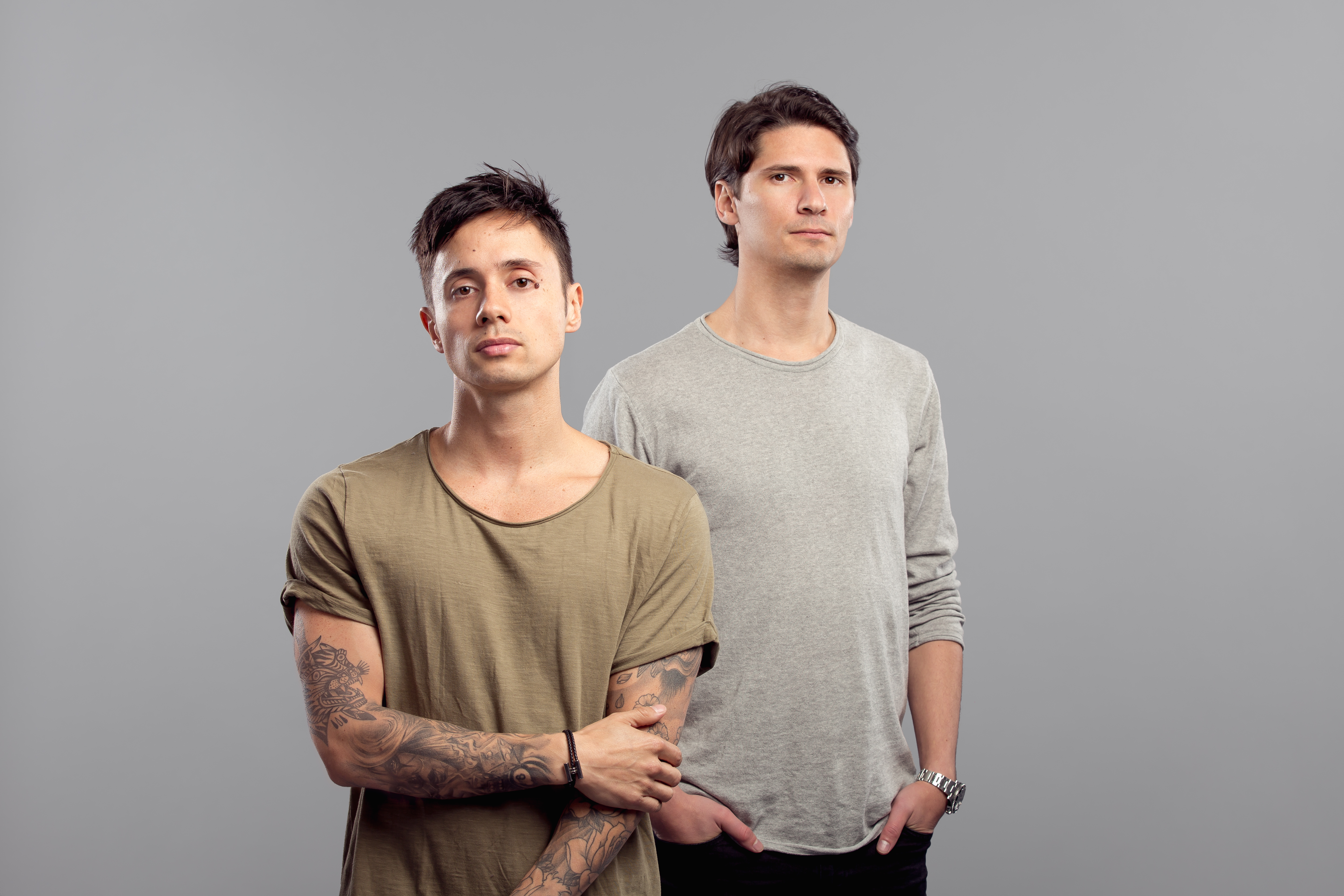
- Marlon Flohr (left) and Ralph van Hilst (right)

Background information
- Origin: Tilburg, Netherlands
- Genres: Dutch house; electro house; big room house; trap; future house
- Years active: 2007–present
- Labels: Spinnin'; Revealed; Musical Freedom; Smash the House; Wall Recordings; Protocol Recordings
- Members: Marlon Flohr; Ralph van Hilst
- Website: bassjackers.com

Bassjackers is a Dutch electronic music production and DJ duo consisting of Marlon Flohr & Ralph van Hilst. Marlon is the more outspoken member of the duo whereas Ralph takes care of "behind-the-scenes" production.

The duo's electro house tracks, including "Savior", "Crackin" and "Wave Your Hands", reached the Beatport top 100. They are best known for their 2013 single, "Crackin". They ranked at #27 on DJ Mag's Top 100 DJs of 2022. They have released their tracks on the labels Spinnin' Records, Revealed Recordings and Smash the House.

== History ==
=== Beginnings (2007) ===
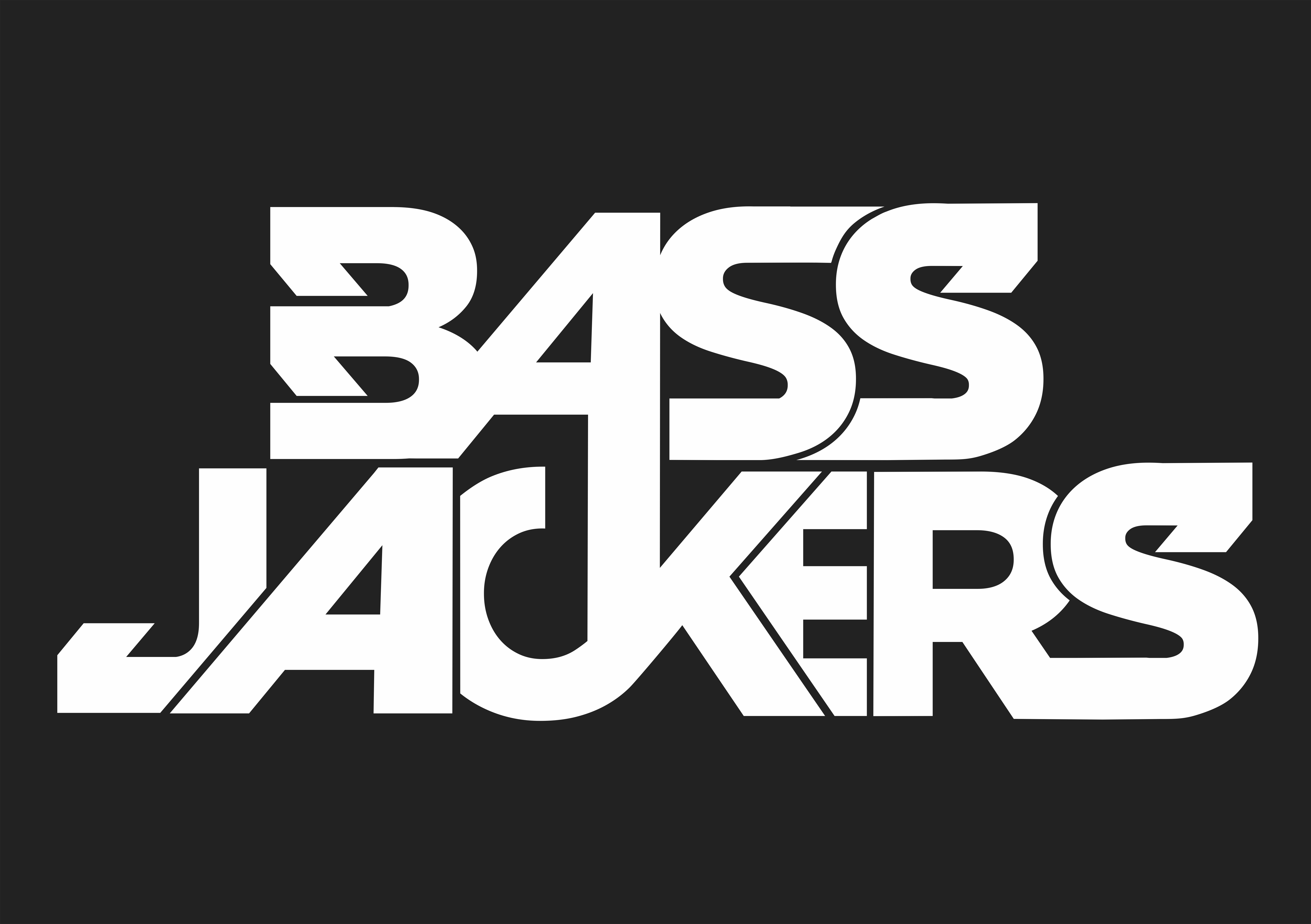
Bassjackers' official logo

Marlon and Ralph were friends in high school, where they formed Bassjackers in 2007. The duo began performing together, with Marlon as the showman and Ralph more involved in "behind-the-scenes" production.

=== First successes and recording contract (2010–2012) ===
In 2011, the single "Mush Mush" appeared on Beatport. The track was more successful than their earlier singles and reached the top 10 of the Beatport charts for a period of over two months. It was played by DJs Hardwell, Dimitri Vegas & Like Mike and the Swedish House Mafia in their sets.

In 2012, the duo performed at a number of festivals and began to tour the United States. Their first large concert appearance was at the Ultra Music Festival in Miami. At the EDC Vegas they played their track "Mush Mush", as well as their next planned single "Hey!", a collaboration with the Dutch DJ duo Showtek. The release was postponed and the publication of their Angger Dimas collaboration went on. The single "RIA" was published in March through Sander van Doorn's label Doorn Records. A few months later, in August, they released together with Yves V the single "Bronx" through Dimitri Vegas & Like Mike's label Smash the House. The duo made the song "Let's Get Weird" available for free download.

=== "Crackin" (2013–2014) ===
Their collaboration with DJ and producer Dyro was their first release in 2013. The single was released in February under the title "Grid". It followed the track "Duckface", a collaboration with Kenneth G.

On 15 July 2013, they published "Raise Those Hands" together with R3hab through Calvin Harris' label Fly Eye Records. The duo's performance of "Raise Those Hands" with R3hab at the Electric Daisy Carnival Las Vegas was included in the official music video. It was followed in July by their first appearance at the largest EDM festival, Tomorrowland, in Belgium. Their next single was "Flag", a collaboration with Gregori Klosman. In the fall of 2013, they started working in the studio with Martin Garrix who just released his breakthrough hit, "Animals". The single "Gamer", their first collaboration, was released on 4 November 2013 through Doorn Records.

On 20 January 2014, the next collaboration titled "Crackin" followed. This single soon became their most successful track. Crackin' appeared in two variations, firstly in a Bassjackers version and in a Martin Garrix remix version. The Bassjackers version was provided for free download while Garrix's version came in second of the Beatport charts as actual single version for a long time and thus represents the first peak position of the duo. They even made an entry in the Dutch singles chart. The official music video reached over 15 million views on Spinnin' TV.

=== Genre exchange and collaborations with DJs (2014–2015) ===
On 10 February 2014, the track "Battle" was released in cooperation with the Dutch DJ and producer Jordy Dazz through Doorn Records. As a follow-up single, a collaboration with the producer MAKJ was released through Hysteria Records. The track is titled "Derp" and differs slightly in style compared to the previous track. The single "Rampage", another collaboration with Kenneth G, was released on 15 August 2014 through Hardwell's label Revealed Recordings.

On 17 October 2014, Bassjackers released another solo single titled "Savior". Together with Dyro, they produced the single "X" which was released on 15 December 2014 with "Wave Your Hands" followed as their first track in 2015, a collaboration with Thomas Newson. The single "Wave Your Hands" became their first number one hit on Beatport.

On 20 February 2015, Afrojack played "What We Live For" for the first time at Ultra Music Festival Argentina, a collaboration between him and Bassjackers. The single "Alamo", a collaboration with Dutch DJ and producer Brooks, was released on 25 May 2015 through Showtek's label, Skink. That year, the group released the single "Memories" with KSHMR, in the middle of a tour in the US and Canada. They also had their first collaboration with hardstyle DJ and producer Coone, called "Sound Barrier".

On 17 October 2015, Bassjackers were ranked 39th on the DJ Mag Top 100 DJs list in their first appearance on the list.

== Awards and nominations ==
Year	Award	Nominated work	Category	Result
2015	DJ Mag	Bassjackers	Top 100 DJs	39
2016	DJ Mag	Bassjackers	Top 100 DJs	34
2017	DJ Mag	Bassjackers	Top 100 DJs	35
2018	DJ Mag	Bassjackers	Top 100 DJs	30
2019	DJ Mag	Bassjackers	Top 100 DJs	34
2020	DJ Mag	Bassjackers	Top 100 DJs	29
2021	DJ Mag	Bassjackers	Top 100 DJs	28
2022	DJ Mag	Bassjackers	Top 100 DJs	27
2023	DJ Mag	Bassjackers	Top 100 DJs	31
2024	DJ Mag	Bassjackers	Top 100 DJs	44
