= Dance FM UAE =

Beat 97.8
- Company type: Dance Radio Station
- Industry: Mass media
- Predecessor: Dance FM UAE (2016-2020)
- Founded: 2020
- Headquarters: Dubai, United Arab Emirates
- Area served: United Arab Emirates
- Services: Radio broadcasting
- Owner: Fun Asia Network
- Website: beat978.com/

Dance FM UAE was a dance radio station, from Dubai, belonging to Shock Middle East, which broadcast on 97.8FM in the Emirate of Dubai, UAE, and online. It was officially launched in September 2016 as the first full dance music radio station in the UAE.

In July 2017, Dance FM UAE was one of the official media partners for Belgian festival Tomorrowland.

Dance FM later relaunched its website and launched three new internet streams: Dance Urban Radio (playing non-stop local hip-hop and rap music), Dance Top 40 (playing non-stop chart music) and Dance Desi (playing non-stop Bollywood music).

In about September 2017, the schedule was revised. Many DJ sets were moved from the overnight hours (12-4am) to Friday lunchtime (12-3pm) and weekday late night hours (8-10pm).

The majority of programming is normal presenter-led music shows and live sets from 30 high-profile DJs. Live DJ sets are broadcast Sunday - Thursday 8pm - midnight, Friday midday - 1am and Saturday 6pm - midnight.

The Station officially shutdown in April 2020 and has since been renamed "Beat 97.8."

== Programming ==
=== Local Programs ===
- Beauty & the Beat
- Beat the Drive with Jake Gray

=== Syndicated Programs ===
- Heartfeldt Radio with Sam Feldt
- Heldeep Radio with Oliver Heldens
- The Martin Garrix Show
- Sugar Radio Robin Schulz
- Lost Radio with Lost Frequencies
