= De Schorre =

Belgian park, which hosts Tomorrowland

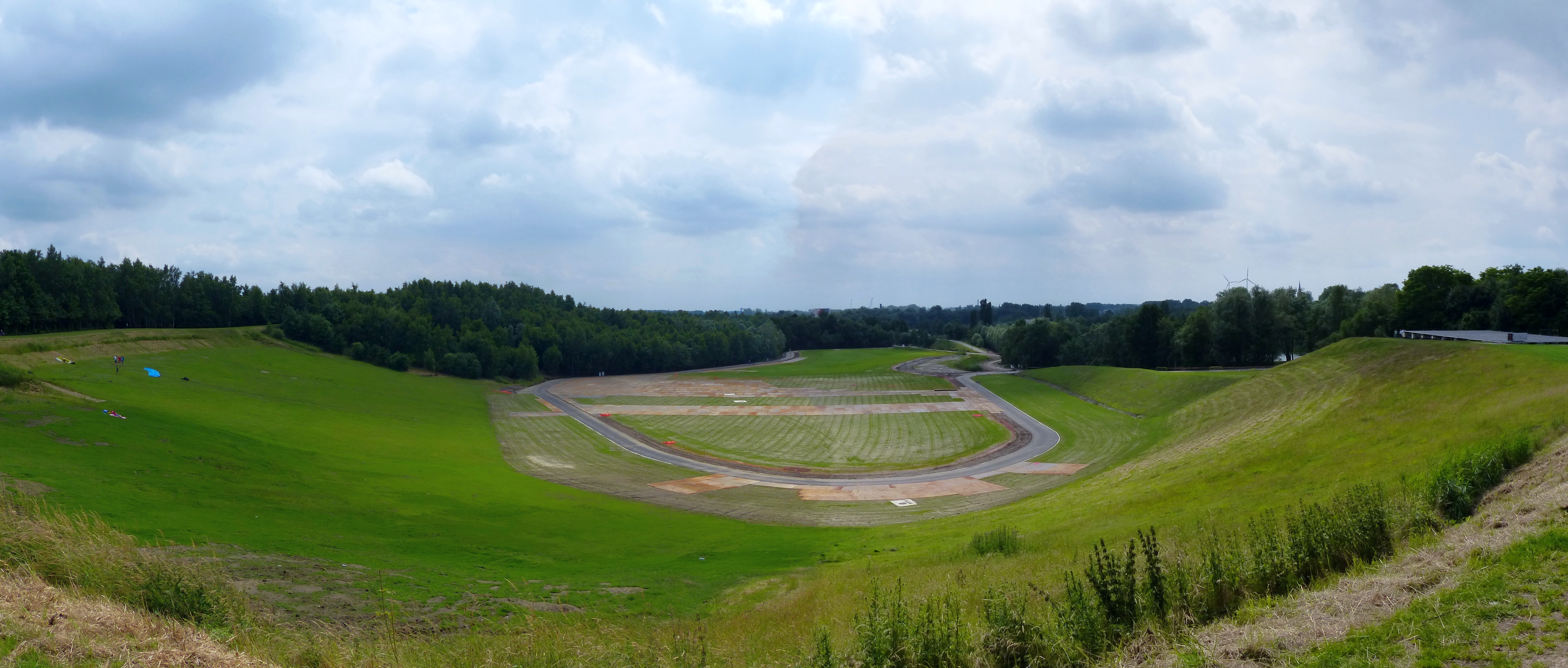
Former Claypit in De Schorre (Panorama)

De Schorre is a provincial recreation domain operated by the province of Antwerp located in Boom. The 75 hectare domain is available for recreational use, sports and events. The domain was built around a number of old clay pits.

It was purchased from Boom in December 1986 by the province of Antwerp.

== Facilities ==
On the domain, there are a number of facilities available to the public. These include:

- A recreational pond for recreational fishing, water paddling, kayak polo and pedal boats.
- Indoor and Outdoor playgrounds.
- A congress center, named De Pitte, which can accommodate 100 people.
- Parking for mobile homes and electric cars.

The sports infrastructure of De Schore includes:

- Football Fields
- Field Hockey Fields (owned by Braxgata)
- A skate park
- A mountain bike route/trail

=== Tomorrowland additions ===
Since the dance festival, Tomorrowland is held in De Schorre, the owners behind the festival have contributed to additions to the domain. This includes:

- A walking and cycling bridge, called the One World Bridge, in 2014. It features more than 210,000 messages from the visitors of the festival on wooden slats.
- A magical troll forest, built by Thomas Dambo in 2019. This forest is very popular with visitors and younger children.
- A 60 meter long, handcrafted mosaic staircase, called The Stairway to Unity in 2022.
- A new brasserie, offering a warm atmosphere, takeaway options and more, called Brasserie De Schorre in 2025.

== Events ==
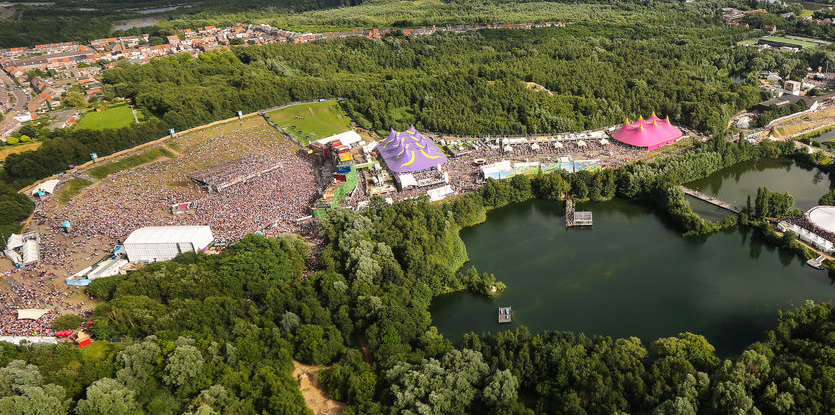
Tomorrowland - Aerial Image

De Schorre hosts a number of events, year around. This includes:

- The large dance festival Tomorrowland, has been held in De Schorre since 2005. During the building and breaking down period, De Schorre is closed from June until Mid-August, or for about 13 weeks.
- The Sparticus Run, a course of 10 km with 27 challenges, has been held in De Schorre since 2012.
- In 2013, De Schorre hosted the EuroHockey Championship, along with Braxgata.
- In 2025, De Schorre hosted the event Lightpoints against Cancer (in Dutch: Lichtpuntjes tegen Kanker) in collaboration with the organisation, Kom op tegen Kanker.
- Every year in May, Theater aan Twater, a two-day festival, is hosted in De Schorre.

These events are required, as of 2025, to also keep the troll forest open for the public year around.
