= Tomorrowland (festival) =

Belgian annual electronic dance music festival

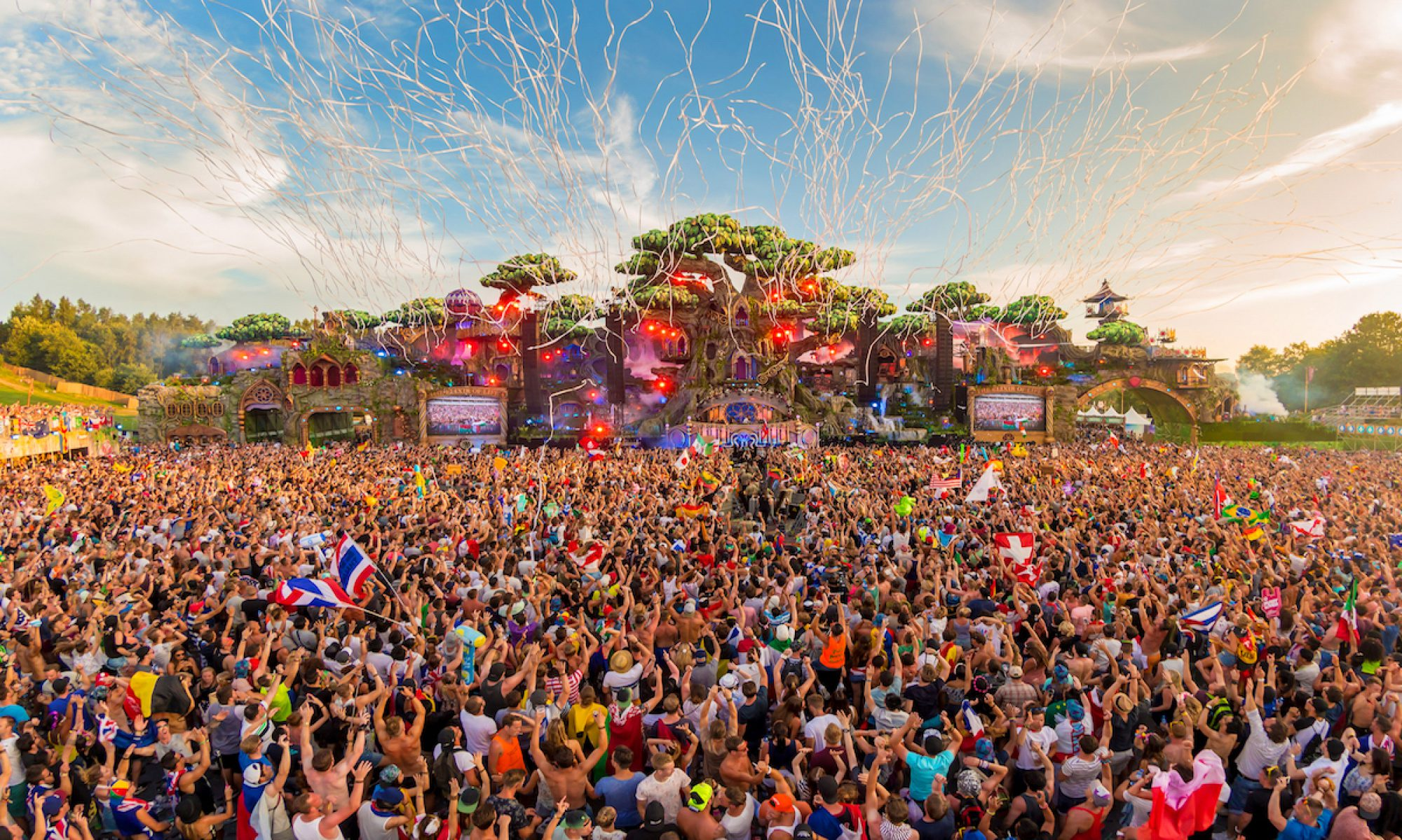
- Main stage 2016
- Genre: Electronic, pop, hip hop, dance, EDM
- Dates: Final two weekends of July
- Locations: De Schorre (Boom, Antwerp, Belgium) Tomorrowland has expanded beyond its original Belgian edition and now has two additional editions worldwide: one in South America and one in Asia: Tomorrowland Winter – Alpe d´Huez, France (Since 2019); Tomorrowland Brasil – São Paulo state, Brazil (2015; resumed in 2023); Tomorrowland Thailand – Wisdom Valley, Pattaya, Thailand (since 2026)
- Coordinates: 51°05′32″N 04°23′08″E
- Years active: 2004–2019, 2022–present
- Founders: Manu Beers and Michiel Beers
- Attendance: 400,000 per edition
- Capacity: 200,000 per week-end
- Organiser: We Are One World
- Website: www.tomorrowland.com

Tomorrowland is a large-scale annual electronic dance music festival held in Boom, Flanders, Belgium. Taking place within De Schorre provincial recreational park, it held its first edition in 2005, from an idea conceived by brothers Manu and Michiel Beers in 2004. Since then, Tomorrowland has become one of the best known music festivals in the world. It has won numerous accolades and awards, including being voted five times in a row as "best musical event of the year" at the International Dance Music Awards. It employs 80 people year-round for the organisation and 15,000 people during the event.

Tomorrowland's success has led to the creation of spin-off festivals. From 2013 to 2015, the concept was briefly exported to the United States, near Atlanta, under the name TomorrowWorld. In 2015, a festival known as Tomorrowland Brasil was started in Brazil. Since 2019, the festival has set up a winter edition, Tomorrowland Winter, in the ski resort of Alpe d'Huez, France. In 2026, Tomorrowland announced its expansion into Asia for the first time, with Tomorrowland Thailand scheduled to take place in Pattaya, Thailand, from 11 to 13 December 2026.

== History ==
=== 2005–2009 ===
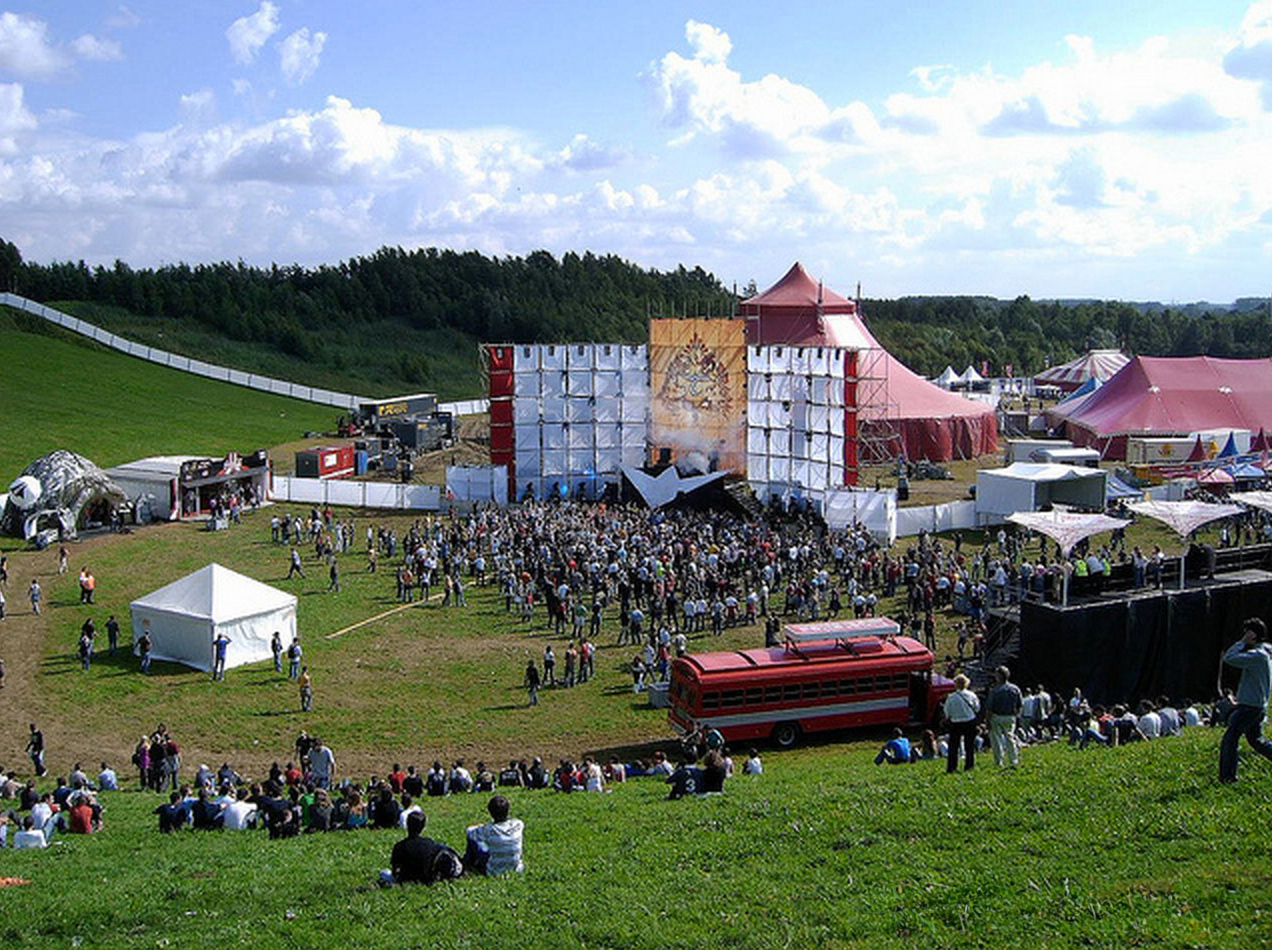
Tomorrowland 2005

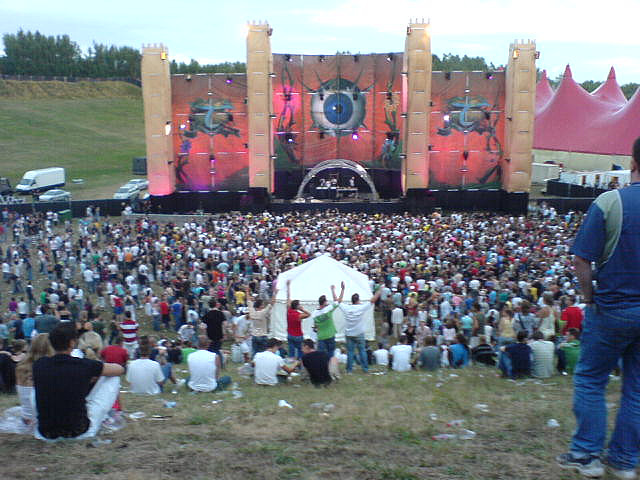
Tomorrowland 2006

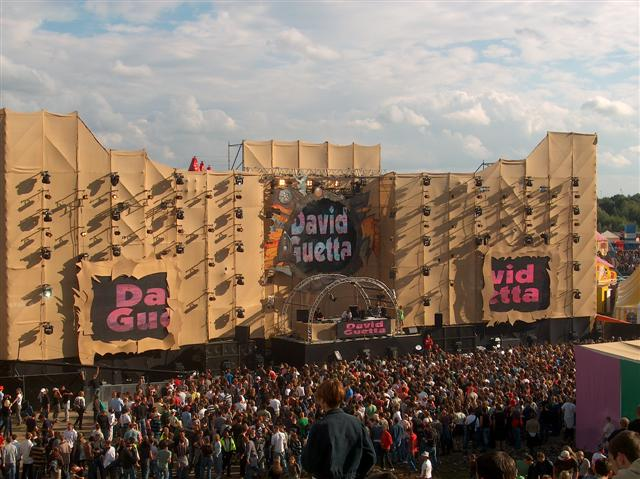
Tomorrowland 2007

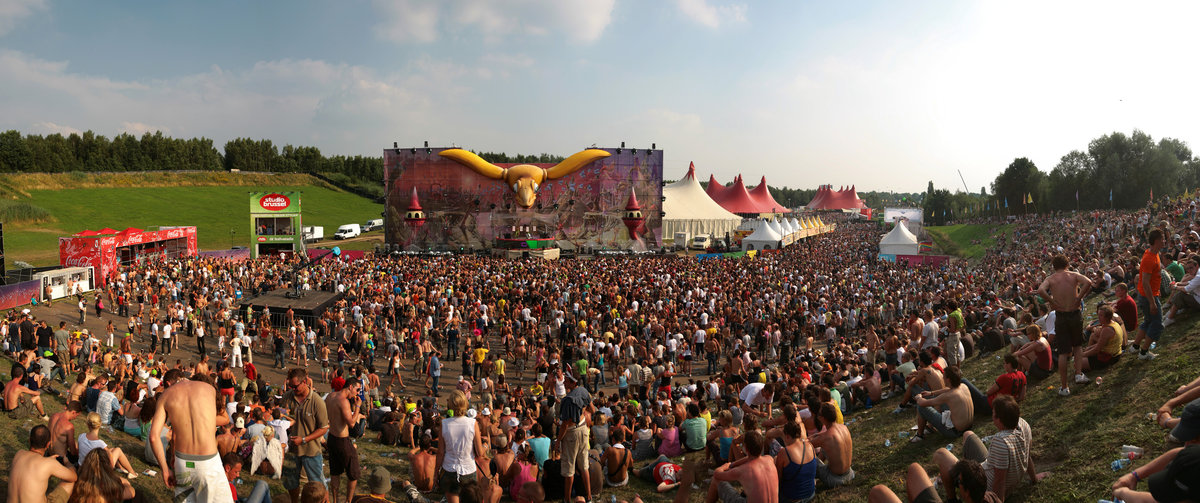
Tomorrowland 2008

The first edition of the festival took place on 15 August 2005. Manu Beers, Michiel Beers and ID&T organized the festival. Performers included Push (M.I.K.E.), Marino Sagaert, Armin van Buuren, Cor Fijneman, Yves Deruyter, Technoboy, Yoji Biomehanika and Coone.

The second festival, on 30 July 2006, hosted Armin van Buuren, Marino Sagaert, Axwell, Marco Bailey, Fred Baker, David Guetta, Ruthless and DJ Zany. The DJ and producer Paul Oakenfold was also announced on the poster, but canceled at the last moment, as he was on tour with Madonna at the time. Emjay, the producer of "Stimulate", the anthem of 2006, performed on the main stage with The Atari Babies.

The third year, the festival lasted two days for the first time in its history, taking place on 28 and 29 July 2007.

In 2008, the festival took place on 26 and 27 July, and achieved 50,000 visitors.

For the fifth event, ID&T led to even more venues, one ski, and much more. Sun has included an "I Love the 90's" stage, where musicians such as Push, Natural Born Deejays and SASH from the dance scene were present. La Rocca performed live at the event for the first time. The special act on the main stage was Moby. Tomorrowland 2009 took place on 25 and 26 July and attracted 90,000 people. The festival saw the use of a theme for the first time: "Masker (Mask)".

=== 2010–2014 ===
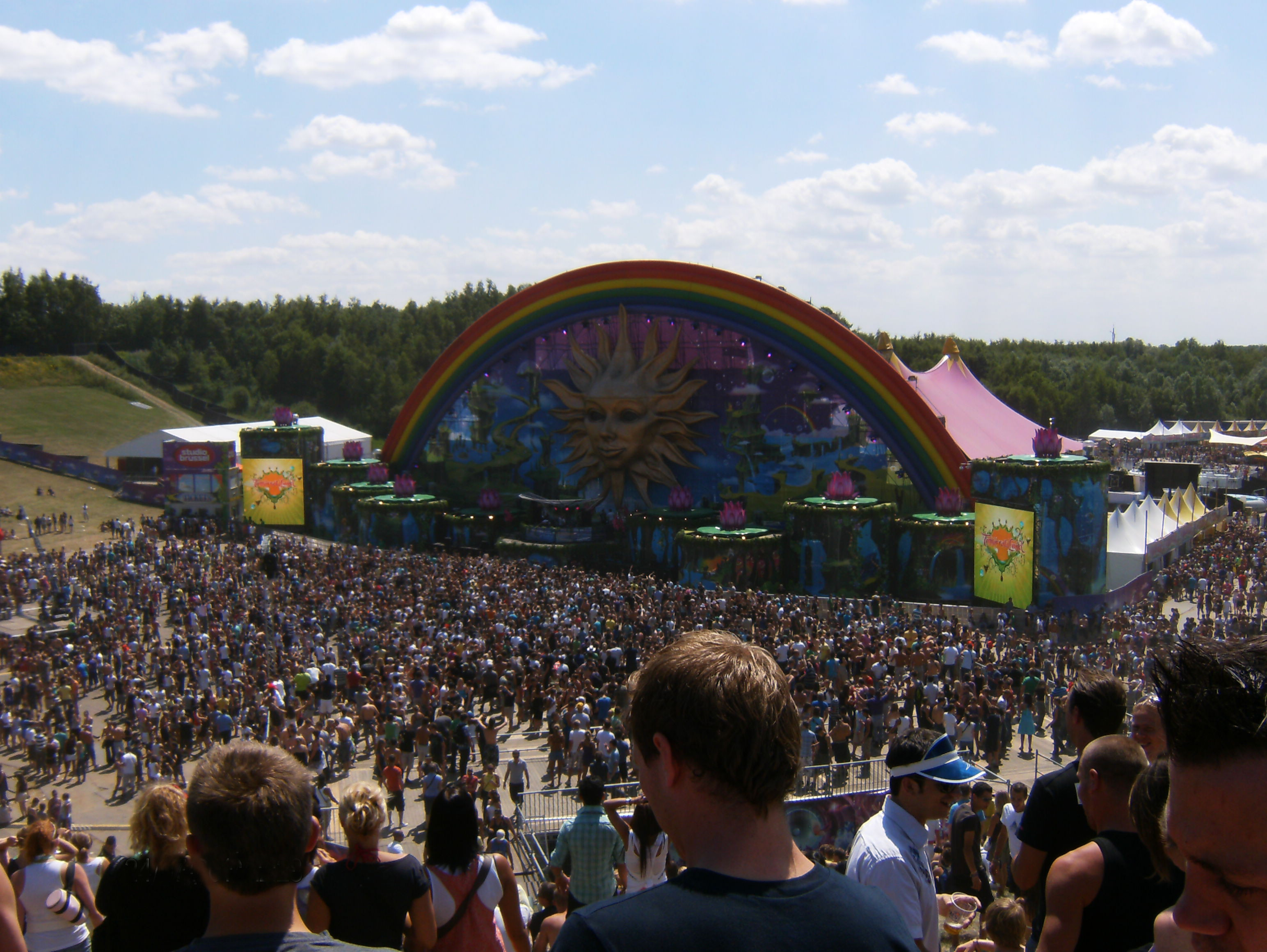
Tomorrowland Mainstage 2010

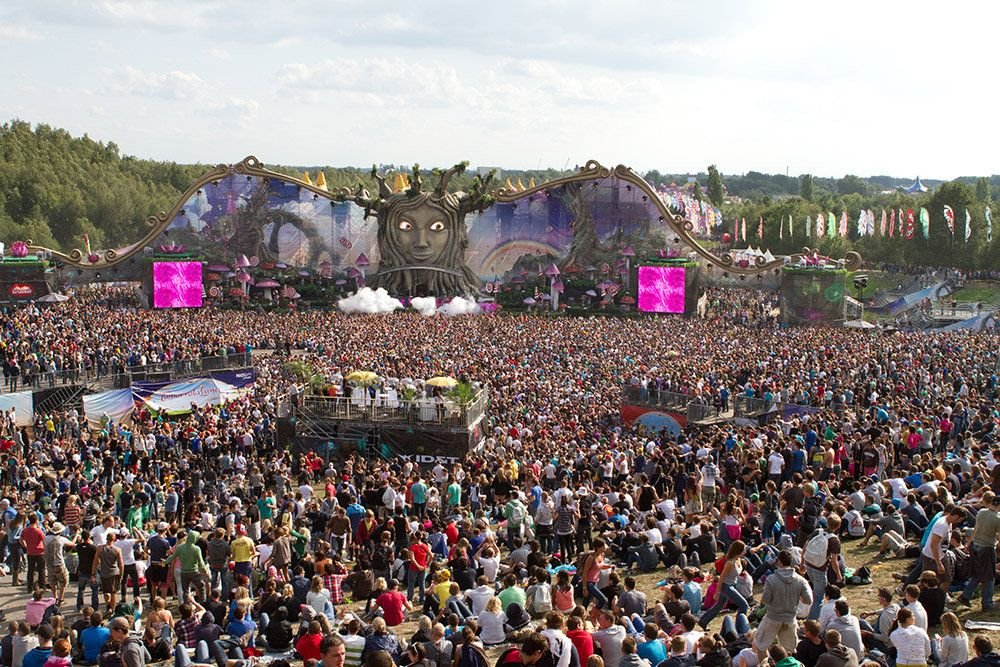
Tomorrowland Mainstage 2011

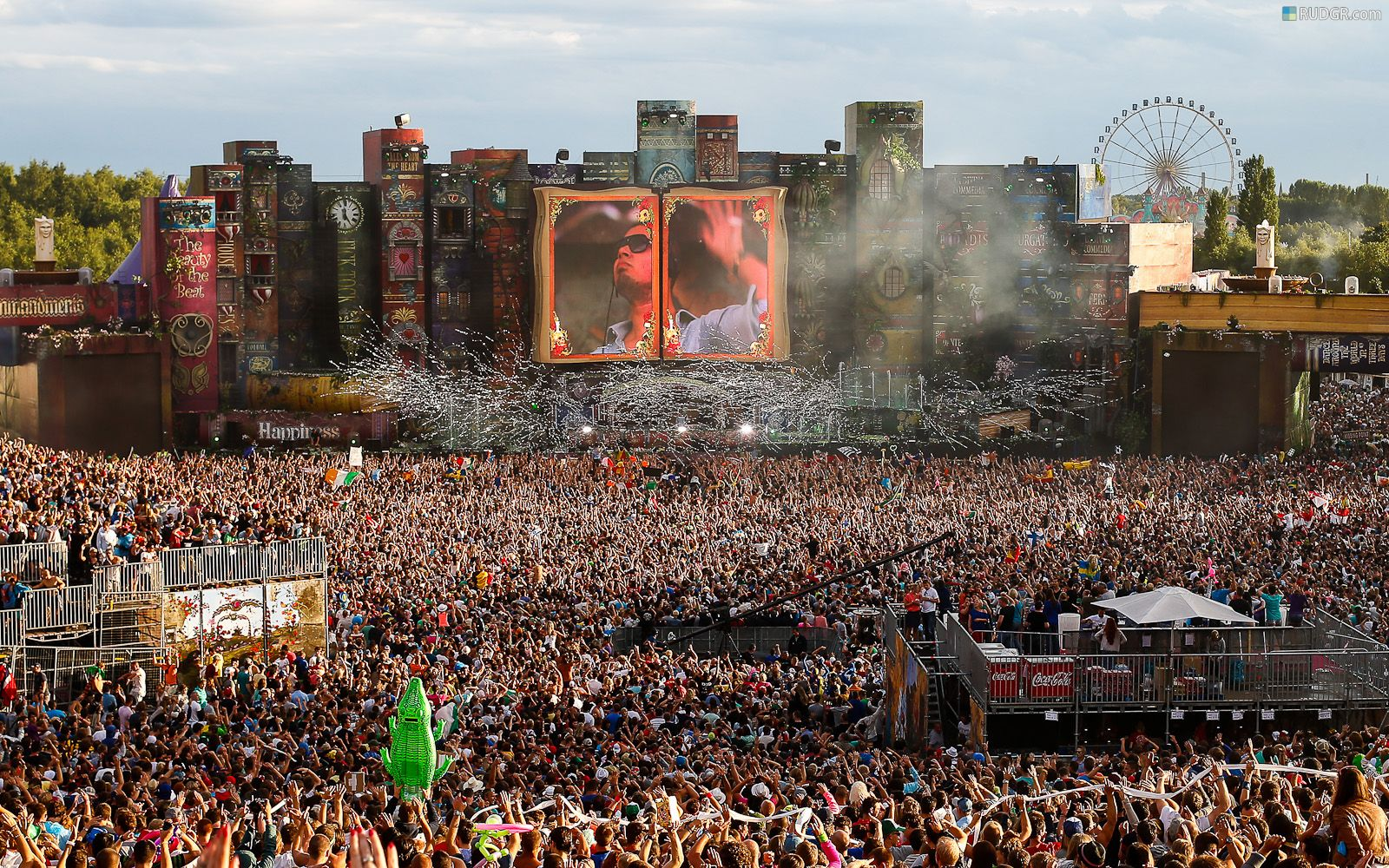
Tomorrowland Mainstage 2012

Tomorrowland 2010 sold out days before the event, with a record attendance of 180,000 visitors over two days. Dada Life, Dimitri Vegas & Like Mike and Tara McDonald wrote the official anthem "Tomorrow/Give Into The Night", performing the song twice on the main stage after Swedish House Mafia. The track was made by Like Mike, Dada Life and Dimitri Vegas and the vocal melody and lyrics were written and recorded by Tara McDonald. The song reached number 5 in the Belgian commercial charts and is the biggest selling anthem for Tomorrowlands to date. The festival's theme was "Zon (Sun)" and was nominated for the Best Music Event by the International Dance Music Awards in 2011.

Tomorrowland 2011 marked the festival's expansion to three days occurring on 22–24 July. Tomorrowland 2011 had the theme "The Tree of Life" and the anthem "The Way We See The World" by Dimitri Vegas & Like Mike featuring Afrojack and Nervo. Among the artists performed in the event were David Guetta, Nervo, Swedish House Mafia, Avicii, Tiësto, Hardwell, Carl Cox, Paul van Dyk, Raven Tensnake, Laidback Luke, Brodinski, Juanma Tudon, Basto, Mike Matthews, De Jeugd van Tegenwoordig. It was voted the Best Music Event by the International Dance Music Awards for the first time in 2012.

Tomorrowland 2012 took place on 27–29 July. The line-up consisted of 400 DJs, such as Ferry Corsten, Skrillex, Avicii, Marco Bailey, Skazi, David Guetta, Nervo, Hardwell, Swedish House Mafia, Afrojack, Steve Aoki, Juanma Tudon, Carl Cox, The Bloody Beetroots, Paul van Dyk, Martin Solveig, Chuckie, Fatboy Slim, Dimitri Vegas & Like Mike and Pendulum playing on fifteen stages each day. Tomorrowland partnered with Brussels Airlines to provide exclusive travel packages from over 15 cities around the world. Other highlights of the festival were the Cloud Rider, the highest mobile Ferris wheel in Europe, and the fact that 25 flights were organized to bring spectators to the festival from all over the world. The festival's theme was "The Book of Wisdom" and featured the anthem "Tomorrow Changed Today" by Dimitri Vegas & Like Mike. The festival again won the International Dance Music Awards in 2013 for the Best Music Event. Tomorrowland 2012 also won the DJ Award for the Best International Dance Music Festival.

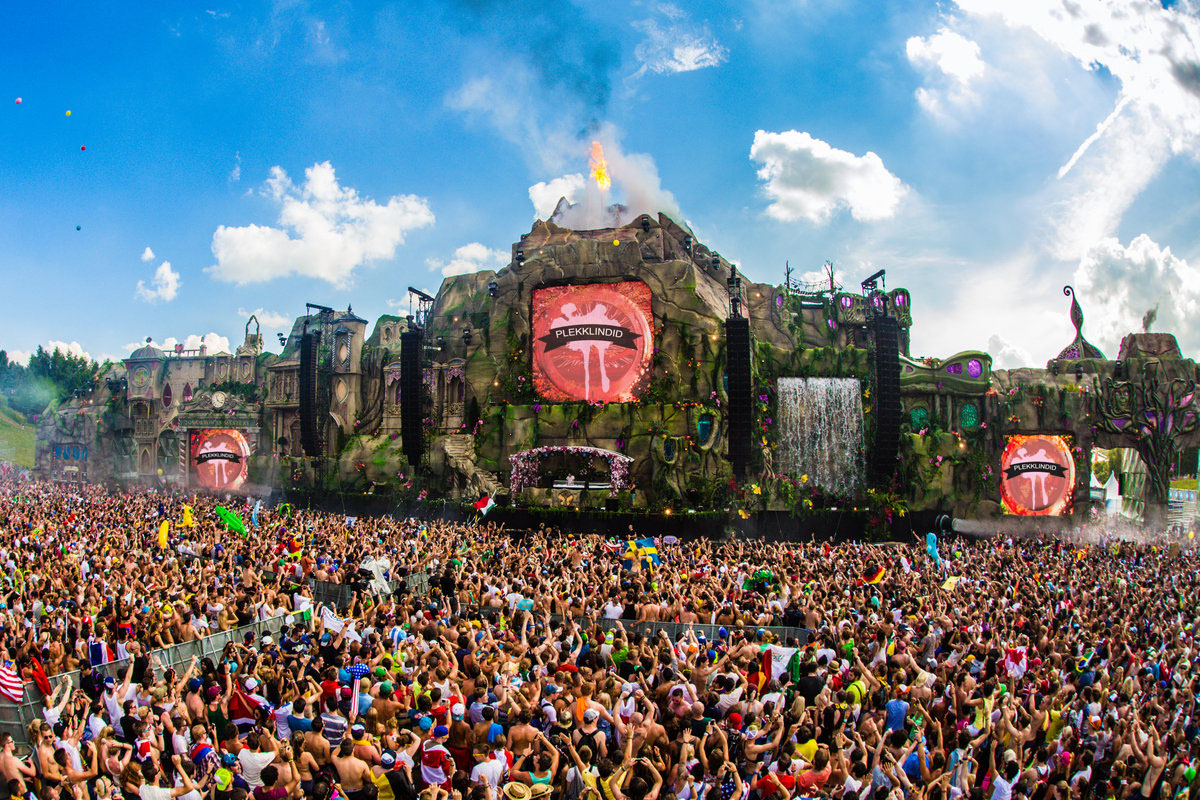
Tomorrowland Mainstage 2013

Tomorrowland 2013 took place on 26–28 July. Full madness passes sold out in 35 minutes, and the remainder of tickets sold out in a reported one second. Tomorrowland again offered its Global Journey packages with Brussels Airlines which had 140 additional flights from 67 different cities around the world transporting festival goers with 92 different nationalities to Boom, Belgium. The anthem for Tomorrowland 2013 was "Chattahoochee" by Dimitri Vegas & Like Mike featuring Maarten Vorwerk. That year's edition with the theme "The Arising of Life" saw performances from Axwell, Armin van Buuren, Hardwell, Afrojack, David Guetta, and Sebastian Ingrosso.

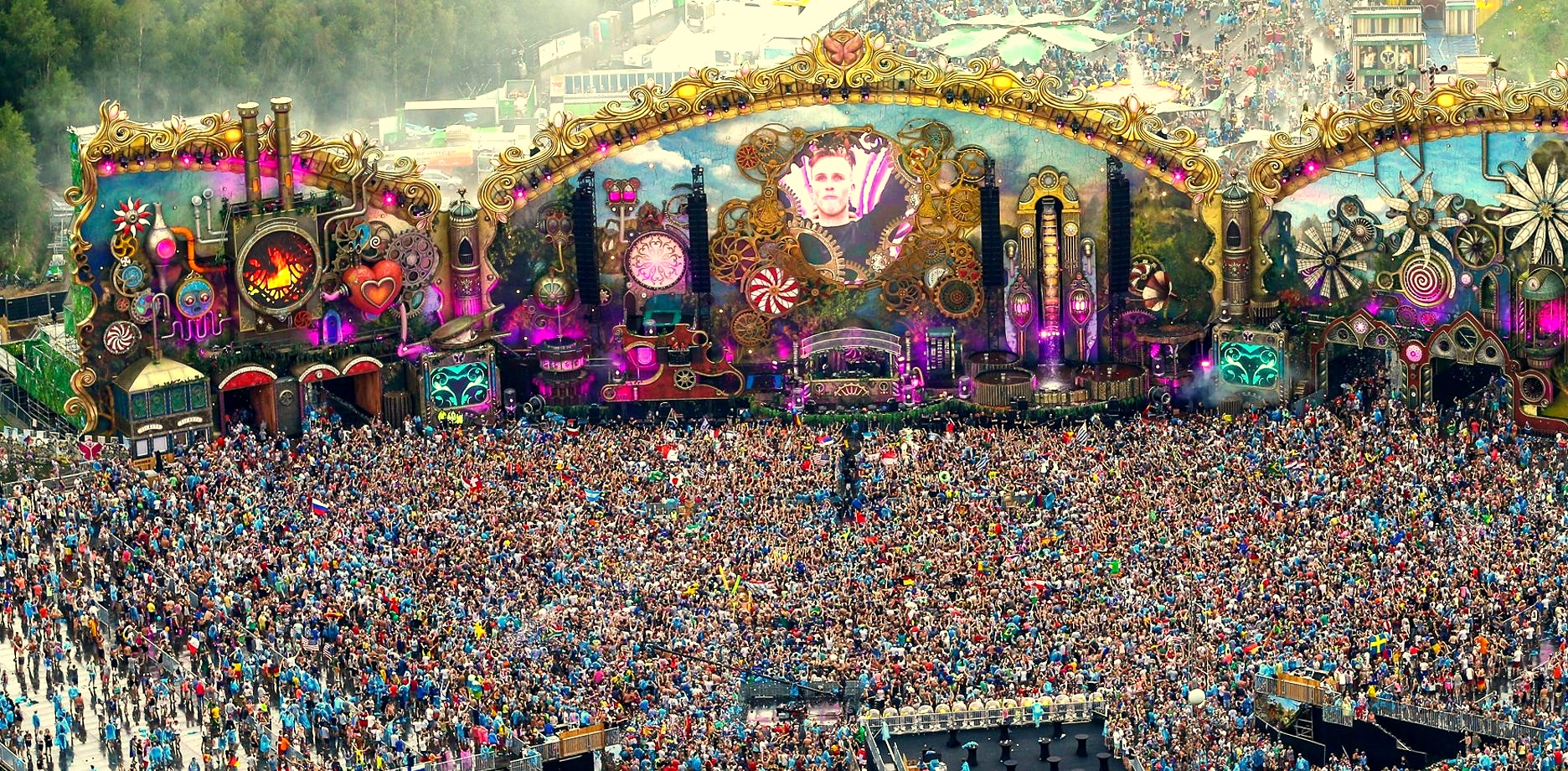
Tomorrowland Mainstage 2014

To celebrate the festival's tenth anniversary, and to meet the high demand for tickets, Tomorrowland 2014 was held over two weekends; 18–20 July and 25–27 July. The line-up for both weekends was more or less the same. In April 2014, MTV announced that it would produce two hour-long MTV World Stage specials featuring performances from the festival (to be aired in August 2014), and that it would produce a documentary surrounding the tenth anniversary of Tomorrowland. On April 16, composer Hans Zimmer and Tomorrowland announced that they had produced a classical hymn that would premiere during the festival. Veteran DJ Dave Clark, who hosted the second largest stage, believes that "a more diverse lineup that covered a wider range of underground music" was Tomorrowland 2014's top selling point. Dimitri Vegas & Like Mike again were responsible for the Tomorrowland anthem, this year working with W & W for the song "Waves".

=== 2015–2019 ===
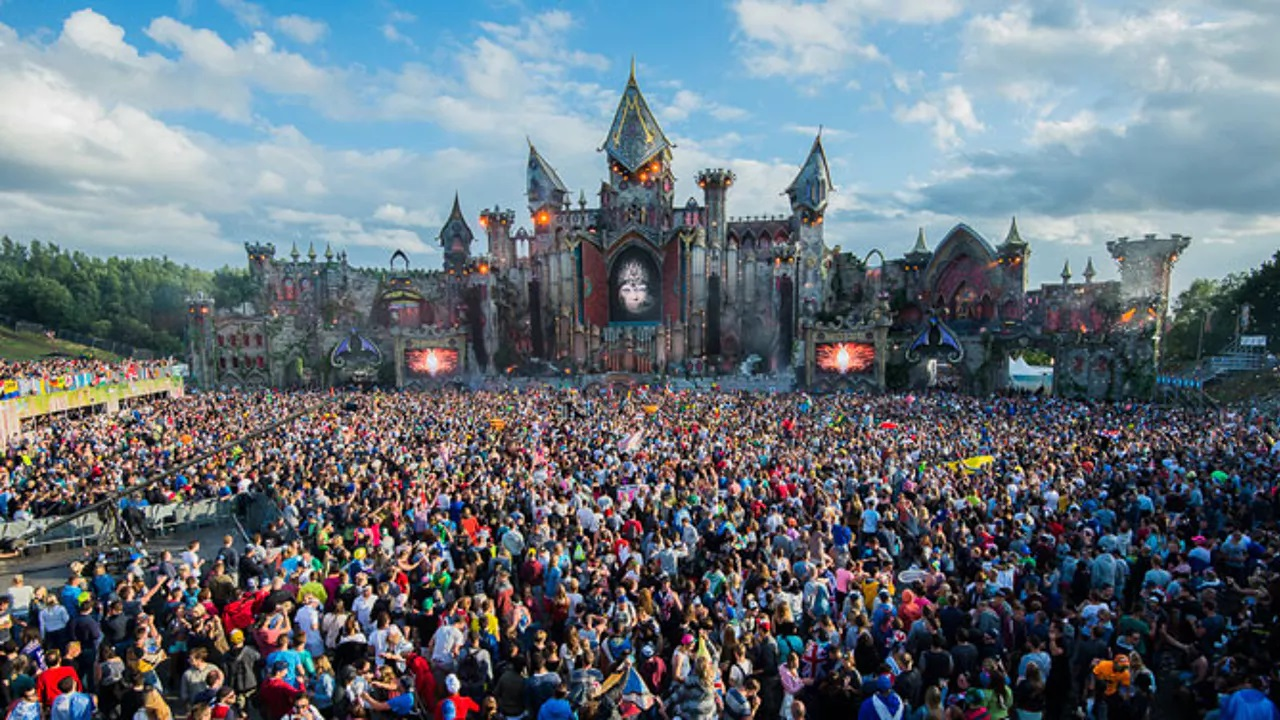
Tomorrowland Mainstage 2015

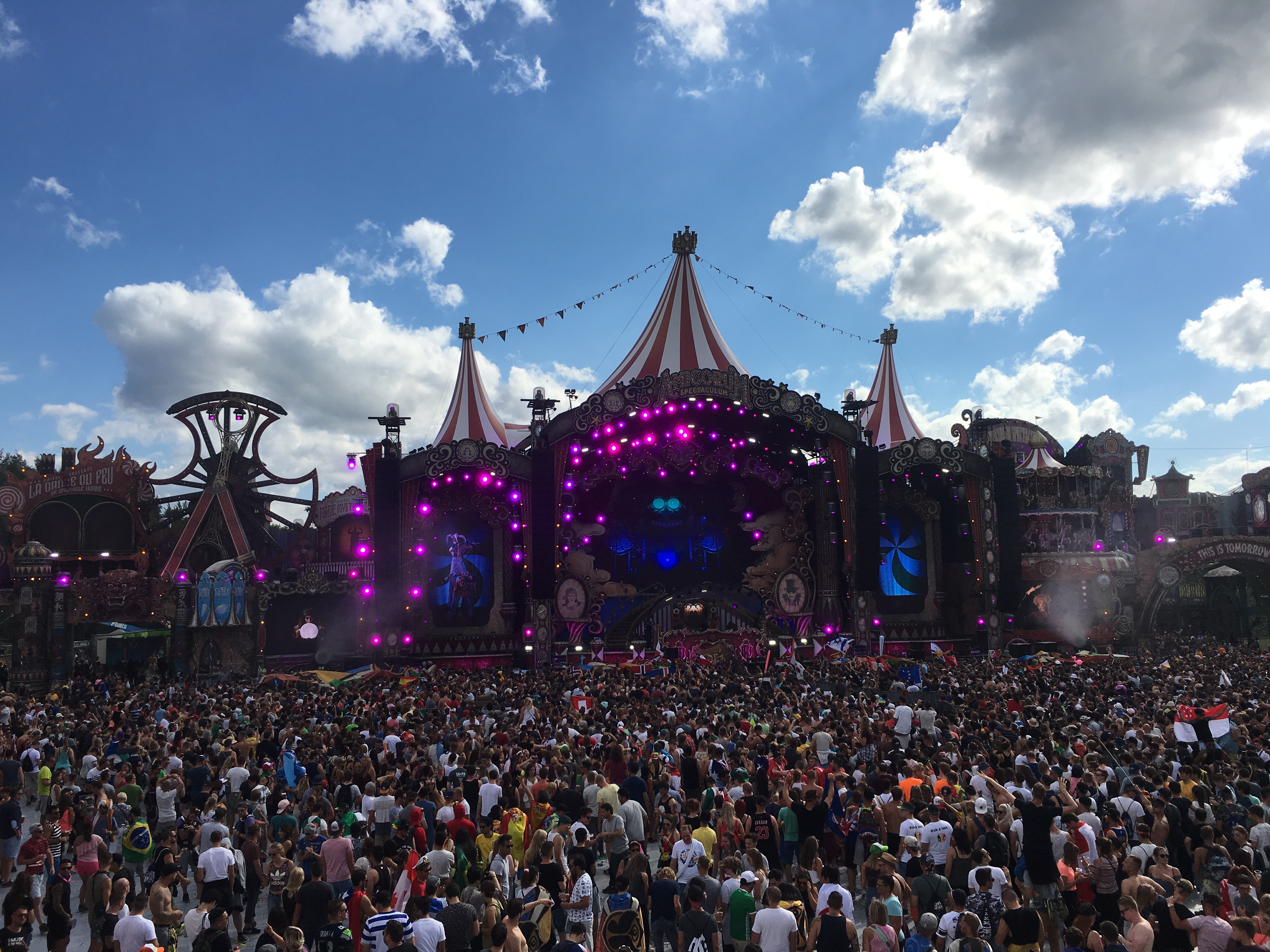
Tomorrowland Mainstage 2017

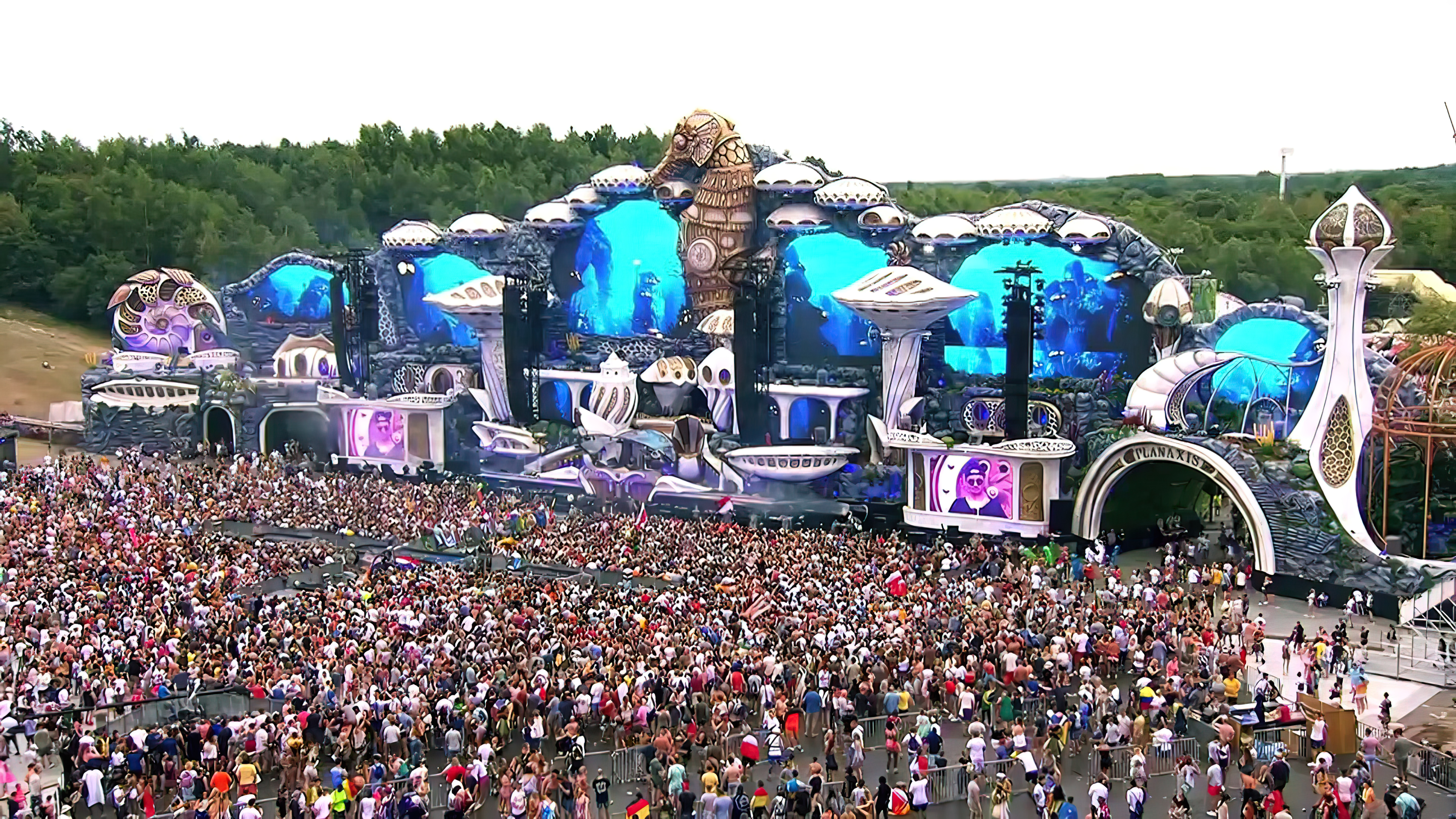
Tomorrowland Mainstage 2018

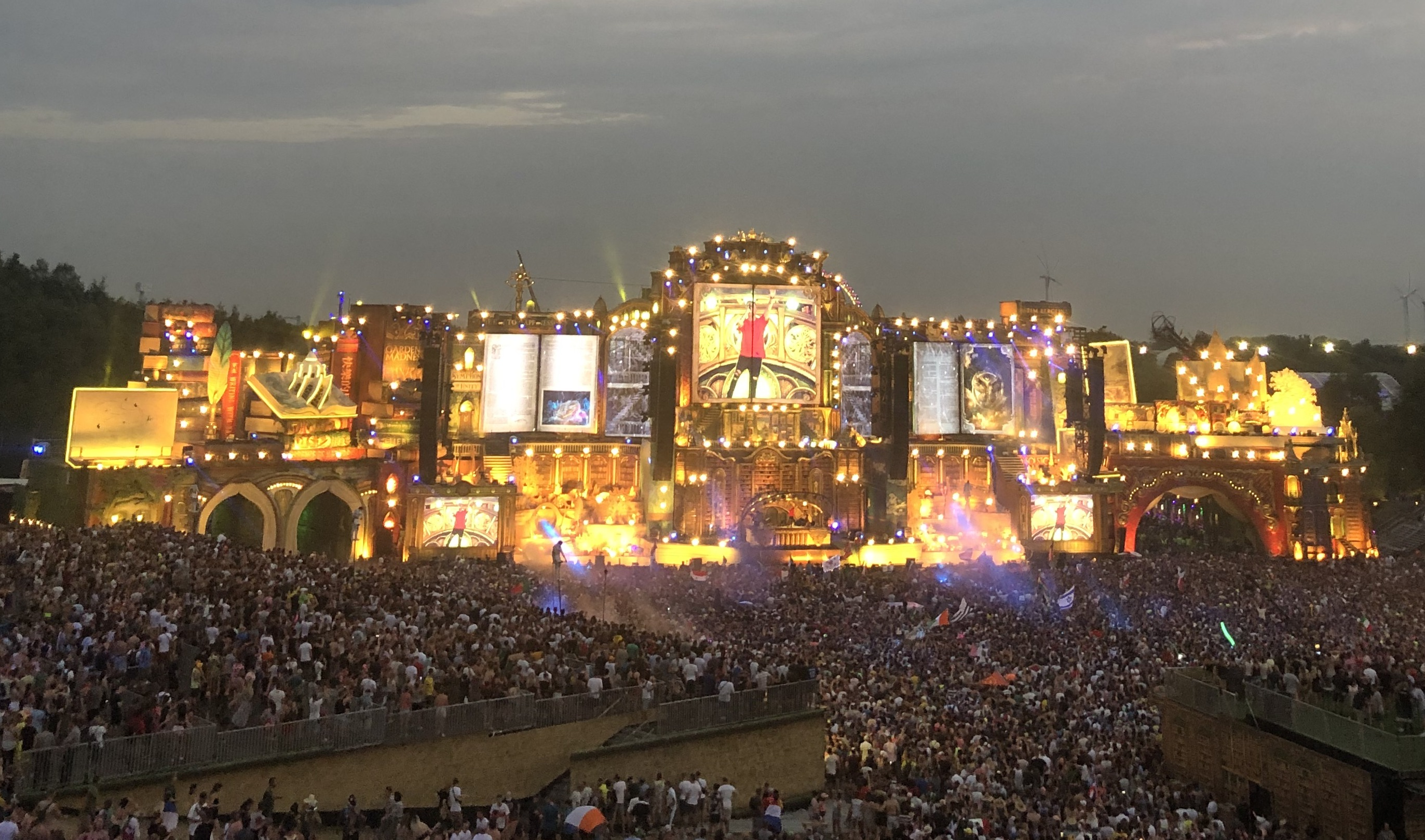
Tomorrowland Mainstage 2019

Tomorrowland 2015 took place on 24–26 July. The theme for the year was "The Secret Kingdom of Melodia". Performers included Avicii, Hardwell, David Guetta, Tiësto, Armin van Buuren, and Carl Cox. The 2016 edition of the International Dance Music Awards awarded the Tomorrowland 2015 the Best Global Festival for the fifth consecutive year, and the readers of DJ Magazine voted Tomorrowland 2015 the World's Best Festival.

Tomorrowland 2016 took place on 22–24 July. The theme for the year was "The Elixir of Life". The 2016 edition of Tomorrowland saw a surprise set from Tiësto on the Thursday prior to the weekend and was sponsored by Budweiser. Other performers included Axwell Λ Ingrosso, Martin Garrix, The Chainsmokers, and Dimitri Vegas & Like Mike.

Tomorrowland 2017 saw an expansion to a two weekend event for the first time since the tenth anniversary in 2014. The theme, "Amicorum Spectaculum", and dates were announced in January 2017, and was scheduled for 21–23 and 28–30 July. That year, a record number of tickets was sold; 400,000 tickets spanning the two weekends. The festival saw a massive increase in the number of performers to span the 16 stages, including festival regulars and new artists making their festival debut. Regular headliner Martin Garrix premiered his song "Pizza" as the closing song of his set. The song was originally intended to be a Tomorrowland exclusive before it was released as a single a month later. In 2017, the festival was nominated by the European Festivals Awards and the Electronic Music Awards for World's Best Festival. The festival was also visited by King Philippe and Queen Mathilde. Towards the end of August, Tomorrowland 2017 became the biggest social media music events in the world at the time, reaching over 1.2 billion views from over 200 million people. Regular headliners Armin van Buuren and David Guetta stated the following with regards to the festival's achievements:

"It’s an amazing feeling to know that while you’re getting goosebumps at the MainStage in Belgium, literally millions of people around the world are watching my performance, even organizing home parties and having an amazing time as well." – Armin van Buuren

"Not only has the growth of the event itself been amazing but also the content that they produce, like the live registration and after-movie. It just gets better and better each year. I think it’s great that people at home can watch the live stream and experience the festival as if they were there themselves." – David Guetta

Tomorrowland 2018 saw an attendance of 400,000 people for the second year running across the two weekends. The festival took place on 20–22 July and 27–29 July, with tickets for the two weekends selling out in an hour. Mainstage performers included Armin van Buuren, Black Coffee, David Guetta, Dimitri Vegas & Like Mike, Alan Walker and Martin Garrix. This edition also marked the return of Hardwell, who headlined the festival three years after his previous set in 2015. The theme for the 2018 edition of the festival was "The Story of Planaxis". Tomorrowland 2018 also saw numerous Avicii tributes to commemorate the death of the Swedish DJ, which occurred three months prior to the festival. Avicii's songs "Levels" and "Wake Me Up" came second and eighth respectively in Tomorrowland 2018's most played songs. Tributes to Avicii came from Axwell Λ Ingrosso, Don Diablo, Nicky Romero, and Dimitri Vegas & Like Mike. Digital Spy described the event as "the most elaborate festival on earth", with the only downside being the admission pricings.

For its fifteenth anniversary, Tomorrowland returned to "The Book of Wisdom" as its mainstage theme, previously used in 2012. The festival took place on 19–21 and 26–28 July, and saw regular performers such as The Chainsmokers, Armin van Buuren, KSHMR and David Guetta return. Non-EDM artists like Bebe Rexha and ASAP Rocky were also on the lineup, however, the latter had to cancel his appearance following his arrest in Sweden. The mainstage design featured a tribute to Avicii, to whom tributes were also paid the previous year. 200,000 copies of a limited edition fantasy novel by Sarah Maria Griffin were issued in decorative cases with hidden compartments to festival subscribers. Supergroup Swedish House Mafia were rumoured to close the event following Steve Angello's claim in the autumn of the previous year that the group would play at the festival "by any means necessary". Rumours became even stronger when the group's signature "three dots" appeared on the Tomorrowland lineup. However, the "three dots" were announced last minute to be 3 Are Legend, leading many to believe that the group pulled out last minute. Axwell and Steve Angello claimed that the group were never booked for the festival.

=== 2020–present ===
The year after the anniversary, Tomorrowland chose "The Reflection of Love" as its theme, which had been surreptitiously revealed on the main stage in 2019, as there was a book with that theme title near the right centre of the stage with "2020" in Roman numerals. On 15 April, Tomorrowland announced that the 2020 edition of the festival would not take place due to the COVID-19 pandemic. On 4 June, organisers announced that they would instead produce a virtual concert known as "Tomorrowland Around the World" on 25 and 26 July. The event featured filmed performances by DJs on chroma key sets in Boom, Los Angeles, São Paulo, and Sydney, which were composited into eight 3D-rendered stages in a virtual world known as Pāpiliōnem, which utilized Unreal Engine. Users could purchase a "live" admission or a delayed "relive" admission for on-demand streaming following the event. Tomorrowland also organised a virtual New Year's Eve festival on 31 December, taking place from 8pm to 3am in each time zone.

On 17 March 2021, Tomorrowland announced it would delay the return of the festival until the final weekend of August and the first weekend of September. The move was an attempt to make the festival more secure in light of declining COVID-19 infection rates and the vaccination programme. The move would have seen the festival occur five weeks later than its usual dates at the end of July. In April, Tomorrowland announced that a second edition of Tomorrowland Around the World would take place during the traditional July dates. Despite Belgium planning to allow large-scale outdoor events with up to 75,000 people starting from 13 August 2021, on 17 June, the mayors of Boom and Rumst jointly announced that they would deny permission for Tomorrowland to be held, citing international travel concerns and the Delta variant. On 23 June, the festival was therefore cancelled for a second time.

Tomorrowland 2022 was expanded to three weekends, taking place on 15–17 July, 22–24 July, and 29–31 July. The theme was "The Reflection of Love". The festival welcomed 600,000 visitors from 200 countries.

Tomorrowland 2023 took place during two weekends, 21–23 and 28–30 July. About more than 600 DJs performed on 14 different stages. The July line-up was announced on 28 January 2023, during the special digital event "Adscendo - A Digital Introduction", an exclusive livestream for all pre-registered people. The digital livestream event featured 30–60 minutes performances from R3HAB, Afrojack, Armin van Buuren, W&W, Amelie Lens, Ape Rave Club, Like Mike, Dom Dolla, Kölsch, Sunnery James & Ryan Marciano, Amber Broos, James Hype, Tale Of Us or Mandy.

In 2023, the province of Antwerp and the cities of Boom and Rumst announced that they had reached an agreement with festival parent company WeAreOne.World to allow Tomorrowland to continue to use De Schorre for the next 66 years.

Tomorrowland 2024 took place over 19–21 and 26–28 July with 400,000 people in attendance, celebrating its twentieth anniversary.

As the only major festival still using disposable cups during the summer of 2024, it received a fine of 727,000 euros, broken down into 27,200 euros of planned fine and the capital gain of 700,000 euros saved by not respecting the rules according to the spokesperson for the Department of the Environment.

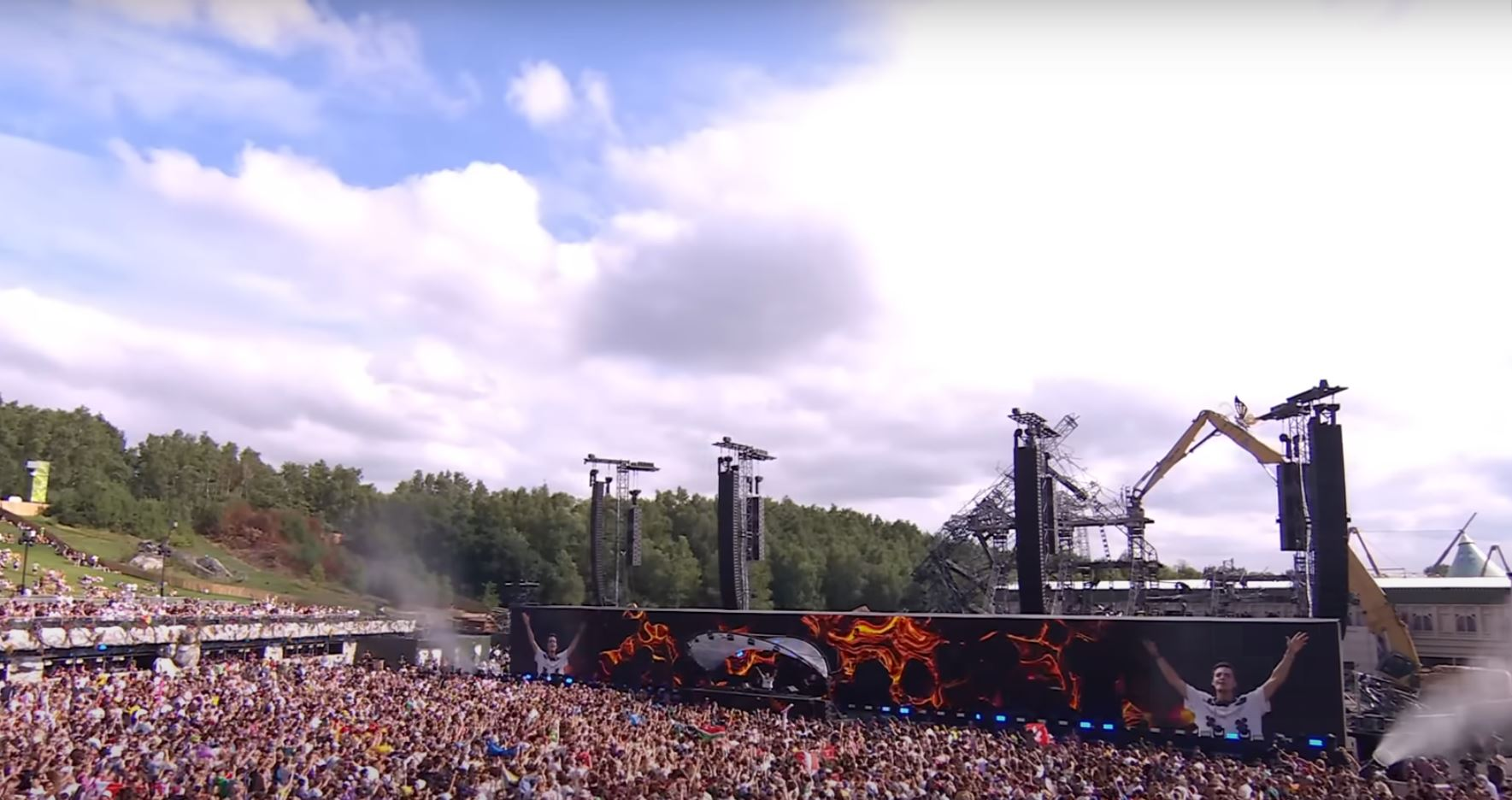
Tomorrowland Mainstage 2025, with the destroyed remains of the original mainstage in the background

On 16 July 2025, two days prior to the opening day of the first weekend of that year's festival, the main stage was completely destroyed by a fire. Antwerp authorities are investigating the incident as an "unintentional arson", and no injuries were reported. Organisers stated that they were working to prioritise the safety of attendees, and were "finding solutions for the festival weekend". The DreamVille campsite opened on 17 July as scheduled, and it was announced that a smaller, alternative main stage would be constructed by either 18 or 19 July (with DreamVille's Gathering Stage used as a backup for 18 July if it was not completed). The rapid destruction of the main stage drew criticism, as experts noted it was built from highly flammable materials like polystyrene and wood—making it vulnerable to fire even from a small spark, according to VRT NWS. The new main stage was completed on 18 July, consisting of a wide video wall and DJ booth erected in front of the remaining scaffolding of the destroyed stage; it was reportedly constructed using components from the touring rig of Metallica's M72 World Tour, which were still in storage in Austria.

=== Event summary ===
Year	Dates	Attendance	Anthem	Theme
2005	14 August	~10,000	—N/a	—N/a
2006	30 July	15,000	—N/a	—N/a
2007	28, 29 July	20,000	—N/a	—N/a
2008	27, 28 July	50,000	—N/a	—N/a
2009	26, 27 July	90,000	—N/a	Masker (Mask)
2010	25, 26 July	180,000	"Tomorrow (Give in to the Night)" (Dimitri Vegas & Like Mike, Dada Life, Tara McDonald)	Zon (Sun)
2011	22, 23, 25 July	180,000	"The Way We See the World" (Dimitri Vegas & Like Mike, Afrojack, NERVO)	The Tree of Life
2012	27, 28, 29 July	270,000	"Tomorrow Changed Today" (Dimitri Vegas & Like Mike, WAV.s)	The Book of Wisdom
2013	26, 27, 28 July	270,000	"Chatthoochee" (Dimitri Vegas & Like Mike)	The Arising of Life
2014 (Note: Special 10th Anniversary Festival)	18, 19, 20 July; 25, 26, 27 July	540,000	"Waves" (Dimitri Vegas & Like Mike, W&W)	The Key to Happiness
2015	24, 25, 26 July	180,000	—N/a	The Secret Kingdom of Melodia
2016	22, 23, 24 July	180,000	—N/a	The Elixir of Life
2017	21, 22, 23 July; 28, 29, 30 July	400,000	—N/a (Note: Whilst not an official Tomorrowland anthem, "Pizza" by Martin Garrix was intended to be a Tomorrowland exclusive however was released as a single a month later.)	Amicorum Spectaculum
2018	20, 21, 22 July; 27, 28, 29 July	400,000	—N/a	The Story of Planaxis
2019	19, 20, 21 July; 26, 27, 28 July	400,000	—N/a	The Book of Wisdom: The Return
2020	Cancelled due to the COVID-19 pandemic (Note: Tomorrowland: Around the World, the virtual festival that took place instead, attracted over one million online attendees.)			
2021	Cancelled due to the COVID-19 pandemic			
2022 (Note: Special 1st Festival Post Pandemic)	15, 16, 17 July; 22, 23, 24 July; 29, 30, 31 July	600,000	"Worlds on Fire" (Afrojack, R3HAB, Au/Ra)	The Reflection of Love
2023	21, 22, 23 July; 28, 29, 30 July	400,000	—N/a	Adscendo
2024 (Note: Special 20th Anniversary Festival)	19, 20, 21 July; 26, 27, 28 July	400,000	"Allein Allein" (Alok, INNERVERSE, FREY)	LIFE
2025	18,19,20 July; 25, 26, 27 July	400,000	—N/a	Orbyz / Unity
2026	17, 18, 19 July; 24, 25, 26 July		—N/a	Consciencia

== Venue ==
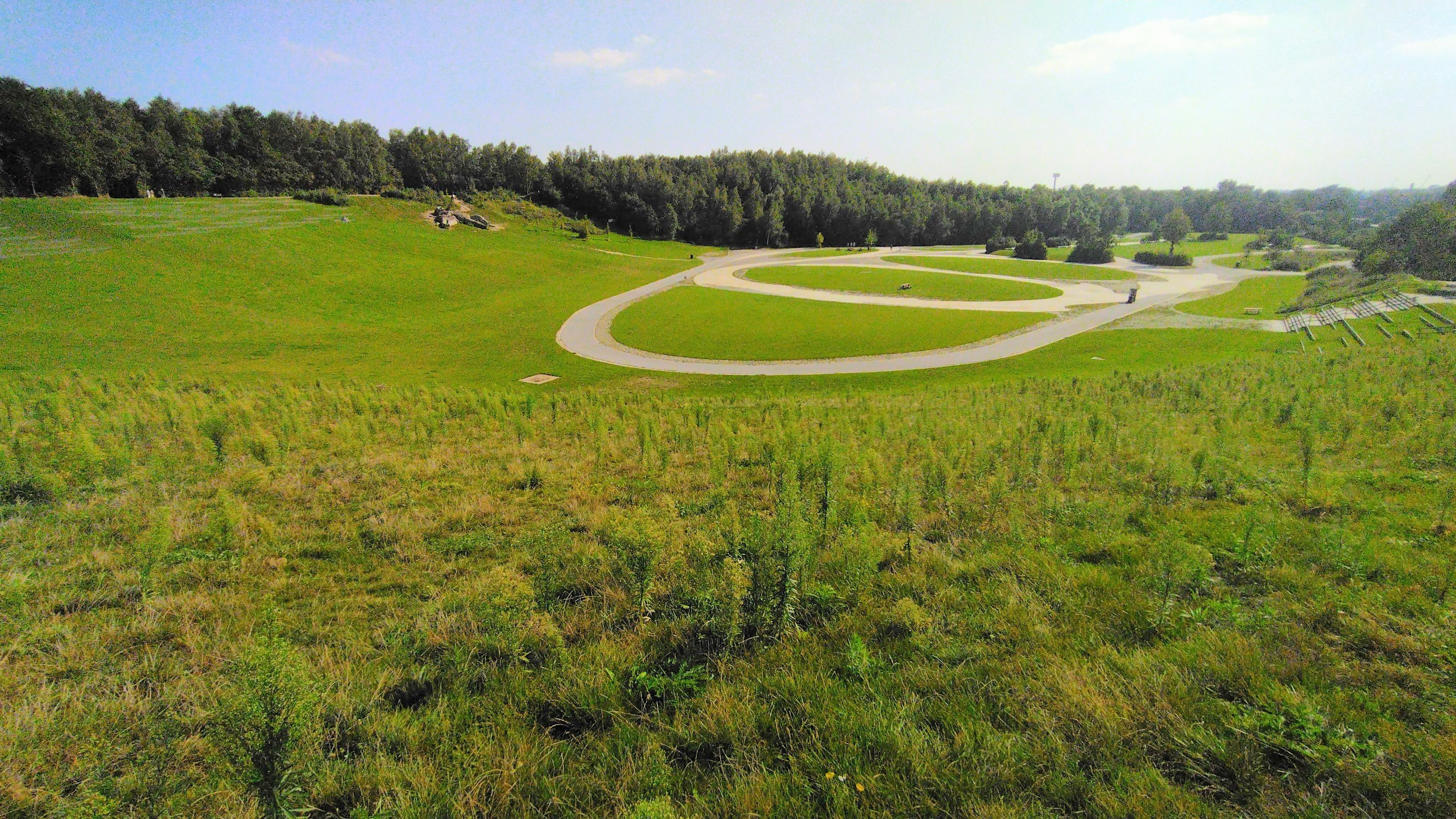
Main stage location at De Schorre provincial recreational park, in its year-round unconstructed state

Tomorrowland is held at De Schorre public recreational park in Boom, Belgium, about 16 km (9.9 mi) south of Antwerp and 32 km (20 mi) north of Brussels. The recreational area was constructed around a number of disused old clay pits; it is now administered by the province of Antwerp. When not in use as the Tomorrowland venue, the park serves its normal purpose of providing green recreational spaces to the local population.

In collaboration with Tomorrowland, the domain contains a number of art pieces, including the bridge with carved messages from visitors and the sculpture One World by Arne Quinze, the Magical Troll Forest by Thomas Dambo and the mosaic staircase The Stairway to Unity.

== Stages ==
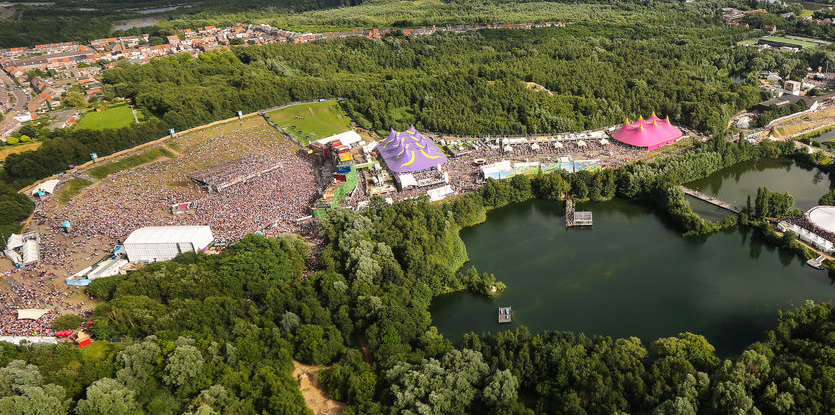
An aerial photograph of part of the Tomorrowland site, including the main stage to the left, 2012

Over the years, Tomorrowland has evolved its stages annually, but for the most part, since ~2014 there have been ~15 stages. Some of these locations have moved over the years, or switched places and had various different names and in-cases sponsors and upgrades.

As of July 2025, this section is mostly outdated and focusing on the 2019 edition of the festival and doesn't have all the historical data. Data prior to 2014 is proving to be difficult to obtain accuracy with as the maps and other bits of information aren't as easily obtainable online. In general, the site map hasn't changed its core layout since at least 2014. With 12 stages in 2025 still being located in the same approximate location that had a stage in 2014.

Years prior to 2015 where also based on the stage host, in the maps, vs the stage name, which makes it trickier to associate a stage with a specific name. While stage hosts are still a thing as of 2025, it is not a prominent in marketing materials beyond an initial teaser

=== Mainstage ===
The mainstage is the festival's centrepiece and has grown and evolved from its debut with the festival itself in 2005. Since then, it has become the largest and most elaborate stage of any festival across the globe. The mainstage features all the headline artists, and continues with sets until 1 a.m. Its design changes each year and, since 2009, has been based on the festival theme for the year (for images of some of these designs, see the "History" section). In 2022, the largest mainstage so far, 270 m (890 ft) wide and 53 m (174 ft) high, was built.

At the 2025 edition of the festival, the Main Stage caught fire. The fire broke out on July 16, 2025, two days before Tomorrowland (starting July 18) in Boom, Belgium. It originated on one side of the main stage and spread rapidly, destroying approximately 75% of the structure. Emergency services were quick to the scene, ensuring no injuries and protecting surrounding areas. It was decided to let the festival continue in a modified form.

This stage has appeared at every edition of Tomorrowland.

=== Atmosphere ===
Atmosphere was introduced to Tomorrowland in 2018, and is located inside a circus top tent. The stage is 32 m (105 ft) tall and 20 m (66 ft) wide, and is suspended from a custom-built crane. It is known for its LED lights and laser displays, which are produced from 18 arrays of 4 Kara each making up a 270° screen. Each issue pushes the boundaries of what is possible and introduces new technologies and innovative concepts to delight the audience. The stage contains an L-ISA Immersive Hyperreal Sound system.

This stage has appeared at every physical edition of Tomorrowland since being introduced.

=== Cage ===
Cage is located behind Rave Cave and is home to harder styles of electronic dance music. The stage has darker lighting than the other indoor stages.

This stage has appeared at every physical edition of Tomorrowland since being introduced in 2017.

=== Casa Corona ===
Casa Corona was introduced in 2019 in place of the House of Masks. It is a small stage that functions more as bar than a stage despite music being played. The stage is located on the water's edge near to the Freedom stage.

This stage has appeared at every physical edition of Tomorrowland since being introduced.

=== Core ===
Debuting in 2017, Core is a stage located away from the main festival area and in part of the surrounding forest, devoted primarily to house and melodic techno. The stage incorporates the local woodland into its design and makes use of wooden paneling and soft lighting to give the stage a more natural atmosphere. A new face-themed stage design for Core was introduced during the Tomorrowland Around the World virtual event in 2020, and made its physical debut in 2022. In 2024, the stage introduced a new design featuring a head bisected by a tall video wall; the new design utilizes inflatable components, allowing it to easily stored and transported to the festival and other events.

Due to its popularity, Core has since been featured as a stage in Tomorrowland's spin-off events and international editions, received a regular show on Tomorrowland's One World Radio, and spun-off as a multi-stage festival event in other cities such as Brussels (in collaboration with Rock Werchter), Los Angeles (in collaboration with Insomniac), Medellín, Melbourne, and Tulum.

=== Freedom ===
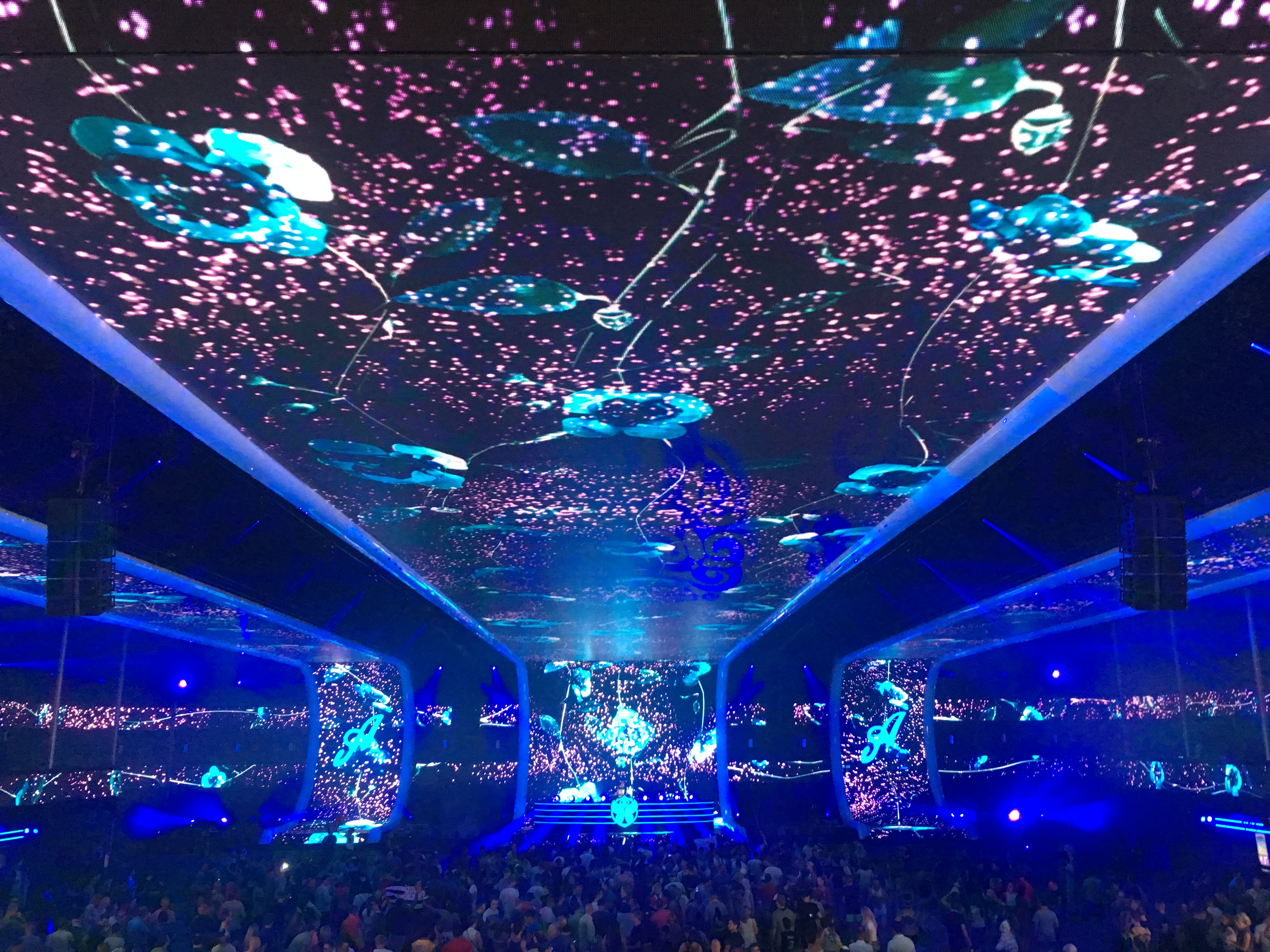
The Freedom stage, 2017

The Freedom stage is an indoor stage that was first introduced in 2017; the stage is a warehouse-styled arena with a main floor and multiple floors of balconies.

In 2022, Freedom received a redesign, expanding to two floors of balconies, and featuring suspended butterflies with LED screens on its roof. In 2025, the stage was redesigned again with a "floating sky", consisting of 210 video screens on winches that can be raised and lowered above the crowd.l

=== Garden of Madness ===
Officially known as "Dimitri Vegas & Like Mike presents Garden of Madness", the stage is built over the water and is a circular shape. The stage is in the centre of the circle. It features hanging plants growing from the ceiling and water fountains surround the stage. Since 2017, Dimitri Vegas & Like Mike have brought the Garden of Madness to Ushuaïa for an annual summer residency. In 2018, they also collaborated with Creamfields for a special one-off event.

The garden of madness stage appeared at Tomorrowland Belgium from 2014 until 2019.

=== Harbour House ===
Harbour House was a small stage located above the water between Q-Dance (Later Mesa Garden) and Casa Corona (Later Melodia by Corona). The stage is house-shaped and makes use of bubble and smoke machines. It was introduced in 2016 and last appeared in 2022, as of 2023 this stage was replaced by Elixir.

=== Elixir ===
Elixir is a small stage located above the water between Mesa Garden and Melodia by Corona. The stage looks like the top of a viewing platform tower in a castle with a giant lily pointing out the top of it.

=== Kara Savi ===
Kara Savi was introduced in 2019 and replaced The Tulip. The stage is a medium-sized stage with a sea shell shaped design. It has a sand dancefloor and generally sees a large gathering of dancers, with dancers dancing around the surrounding banks, this stage appeared again in 2022, but in 2023 was replaced by the "Rise by Coca-Cola" stage, using a more simplistic stage design.

=== Leaf ===
Leaf is a fairly small house music stage located on the walkway across the lake that divides the Tomorrowland site. The stage has a geodome design. This stage was introduced in approx 2015, in a slightly different location (before moving to its second location, replacing the old Mazda sponsored stage location). With JBL being the sponsor from 2018 until 2022. In 2023 the stage became Terra Solis, before being fully removed in 2024 onwards. JBL did not sponsor a stage in 2023, but they returned in 2024 with House of Fortune, which is located directly behind Main Stage on the 2nd floor of a set of toilets.

=== Lotus ===
Lotus is a grass amphitheatre with a concrete dancefloor and grass terraces. The stage is generally sparsely populated with dancers. The stage has a very relaxed atmosphere with dancers mostly choosing to sit or lie down and simply listen to the music. The stage sees a mix of established artists and newcomers to the industry. This stage was present in 2019 but replaced in 2022 by "The LIbrary", which was then upgraded to "The Great Library" in 2025

=== L'Orangerie ===
L'Orangerie is another stage built over water and is a semi-circular shape. The stage has a metal dance floor and is built out of stained glass and exposed metal beams. It saw its debut at Tomorrowland Winter 2019.

=== Q-Dance ===
Q-Dance was debuted as its own stage in 2019 replacing Theatre Formidable (French for "Great Theatre"), and is home to harder styles of electronic dance music. The stage designed features a giant sword piercing the earth which can be seen from most places across the site. This stage also makes heavy used of LED lighting.

=== Rave Cave ===
Rave Cave is the smallest Tomorrowland stage. It is converted from a tunnel under a bridge which has one entrance blocked off. The stage is very intimate and can only host a small number of dancers.

=== Rose Garden ===
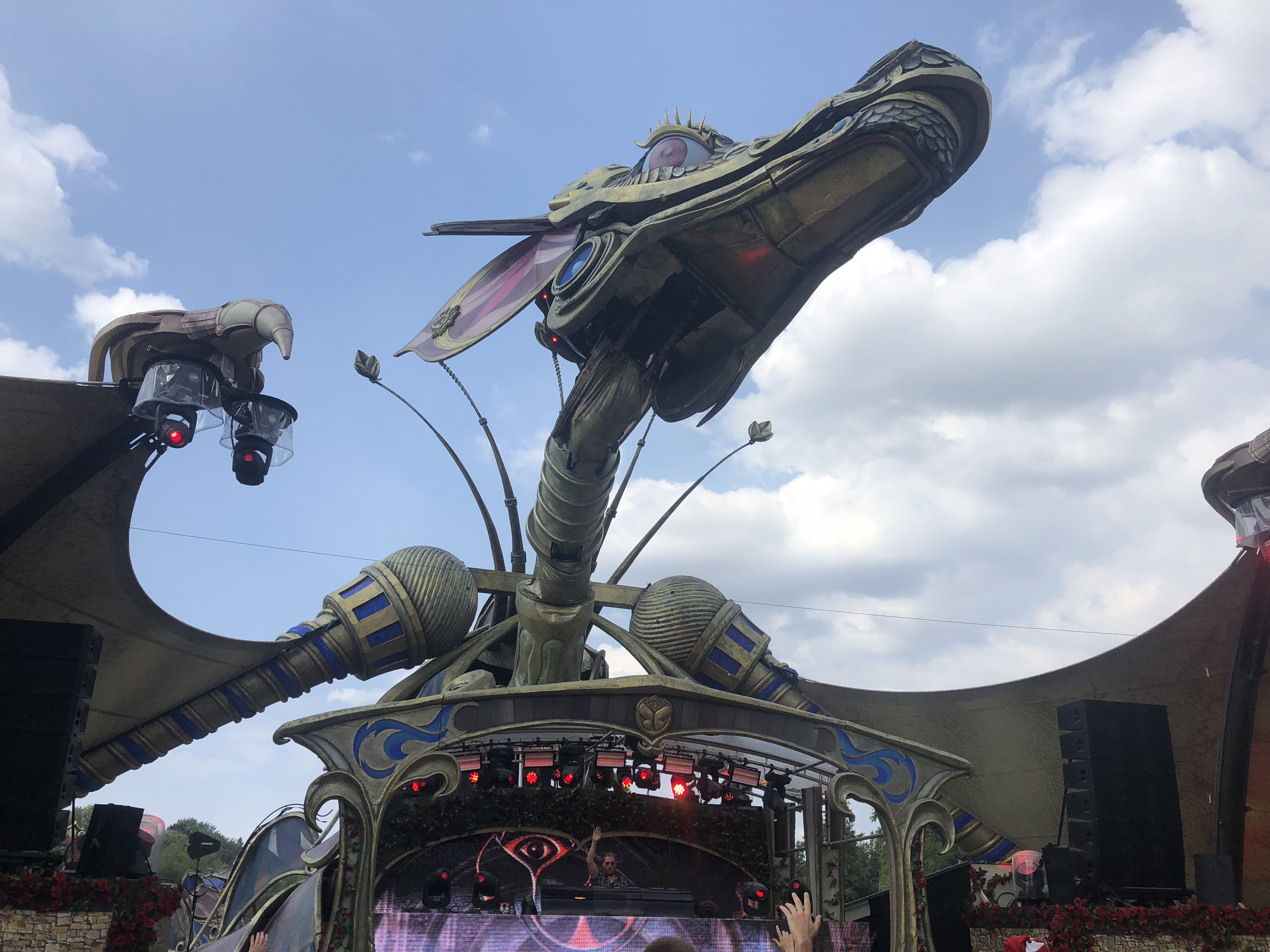
The Rose Garden dragon, 2018

Rose Garden is one of the oldest stages at Tomorrowland. The stage is semi-circular and had a lattice framing. The stage's most iconic feature is a giant mechanical dragon which is moving constantly, including mouth opening and blinking. Steam jets are located inside the mouth and nose to give the impression that it is breathing smoke.

=== The Moose Bar ===
Located at the end, far left of the main entrance. The Moose Bar was introduced at Tomorrowland Belgium for the first time in 2018. It is a replica of a ski-lodge, based on a concept organised annually in various Belgian cities in winter. It features Après-ski style music, which typically encourages drinking, dancers dressed in dirndls and pints of beer in hard plastic Maßkrug-style cups, providing an Oktoberfest-like experience. The Moose Bar is also present at the spin-off festival Tomorrowland Winter.

=== Youphoria ===
Youphoria (pronounced "Euphoria") is a fairly large stage which is half covered at the rear of the dancefloor. The stage has a rather plain design apart from the giants mushrooms which appeared to grow from the DJ booth.

== Flag ==
The festival's flag features the Tomorrowland logo on a background split into four quadrants diagonally, each separated by a white diagonal stripe, which in turn is bordered by a black diagonal stripe on each side, expanding towards the corners.

The festival logo features a butterfly, crown and an eye. The butterfly symbolises freedom, the beauty of nature, and the purity of the human soul. The crown symbolises equality and stewardship, where as the eye encourages people to look out for each other and appreciate nature's beauty. The four background colours represent the classical elements of nature: water, earth, fire, and air.

For every flag bought, Tomorrowland donates €5 to the Tomorrowland Foundation, a global charity aiming to teach music, dance, and arts to children across the globe.

== Catering and accommodation ==
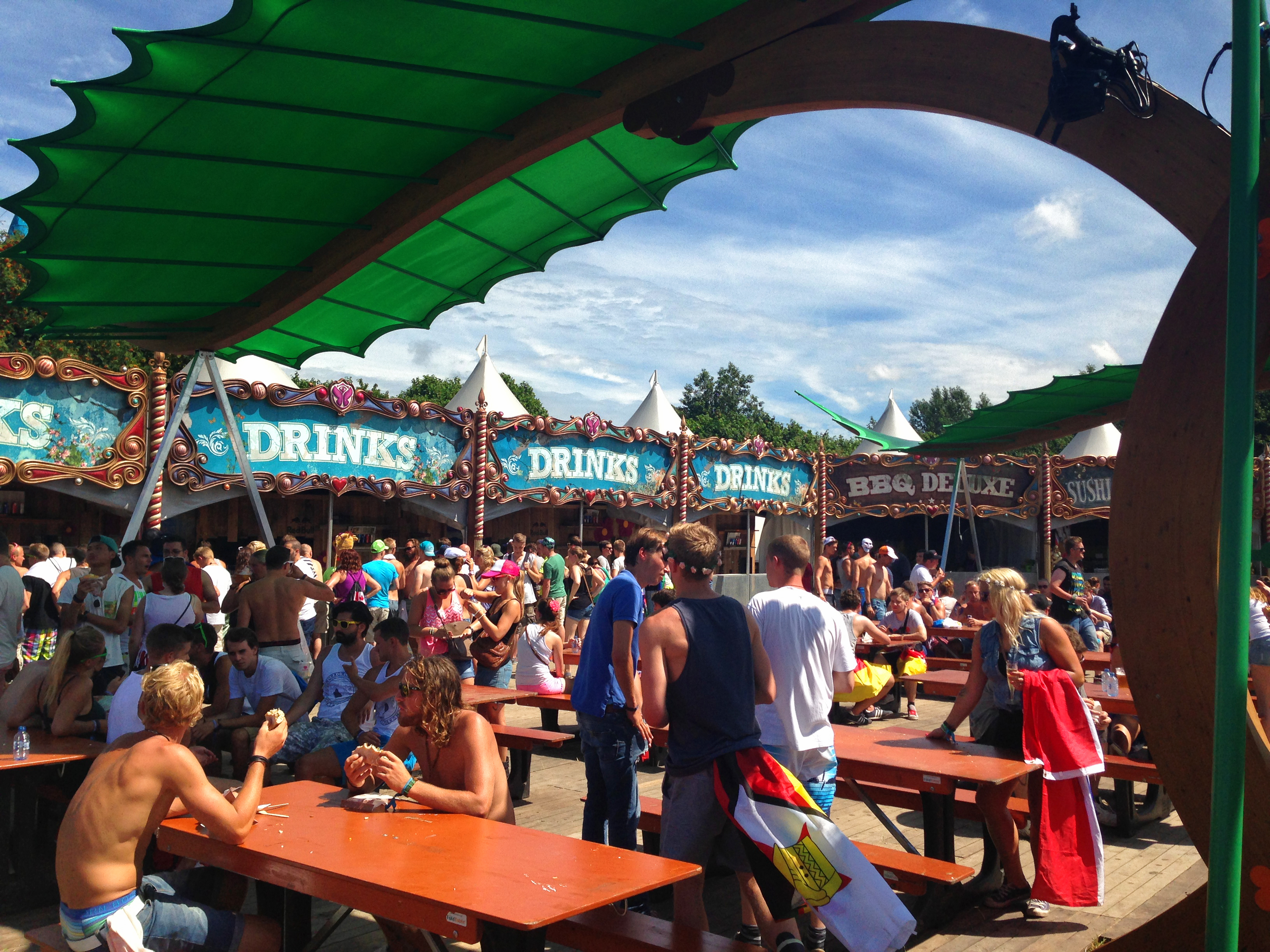
Food outlets at the Tomorrowland site, 2013

Tomorrowland's Dreamville currently has seven camping areas. The camping options range from the Magnificent Greens Area which houses basic campers to the Terra Soils Area which is their most luxurious camping option featuring lockable suites. Tomorrowland also offers mansion packages where guests stay in a privately rented mansion in the local countryside, and hotel packages where guests can stay in a variety of Brussels hotels.

In terms of catering, the Tomorrowland site has numerous food outlets across the site serving a variety of street foods from across the globe, as well as local Belgian specialities.

== Promotion and economy ==
=== Sponsorships and social media ===
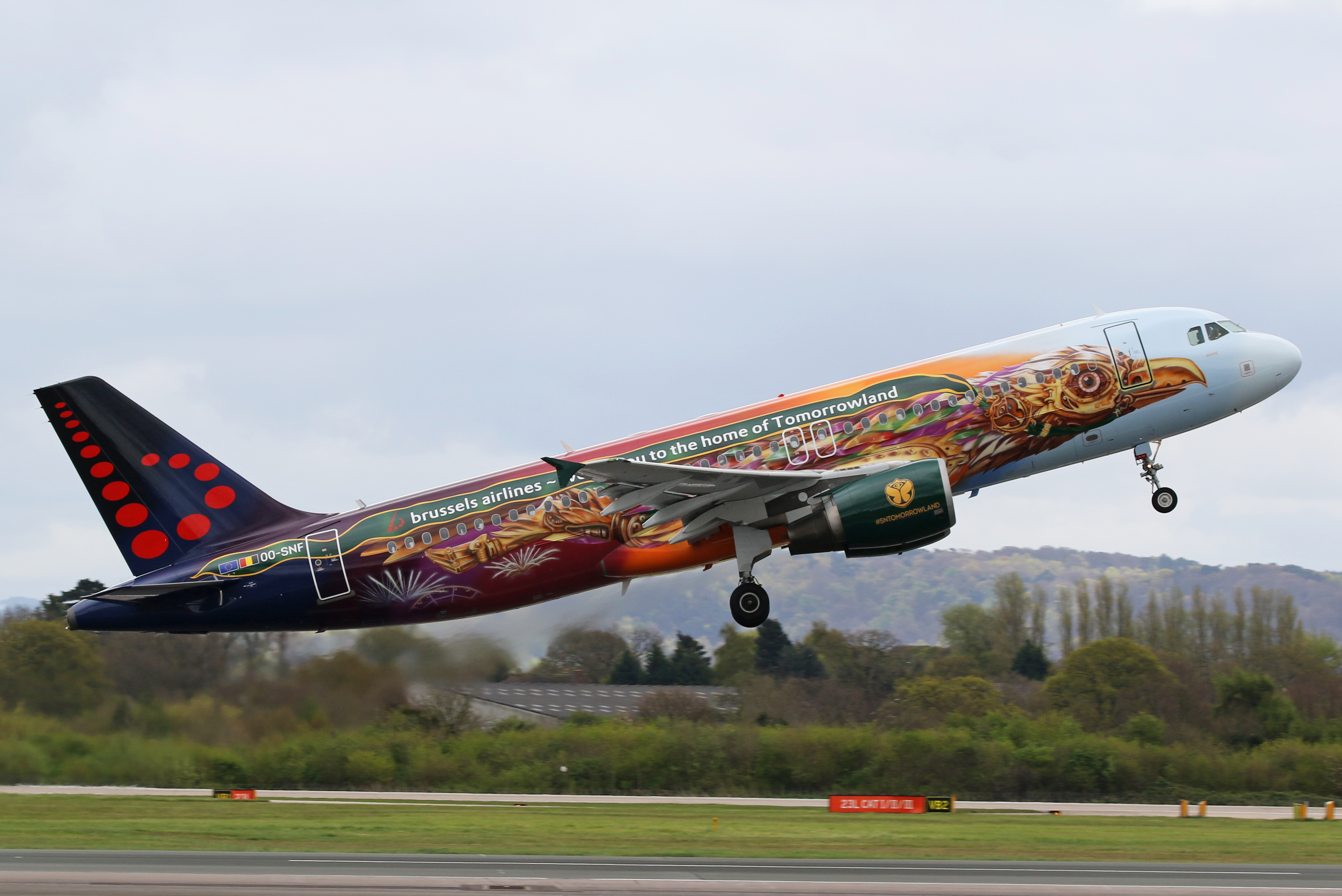
A Brussels Airlines Airbus A320 at Manchester Airport with promotional Tomorrowland livery

Tomorrowland currently has twenty-six official partners including Coca-Cola, Budweiser, and Brussels Airlines, which do various work to promote the festival. Since 2011, Tomorrowland has been filming the event and posting the sets on YouTube. The filming is also used to make an official aftermovie in which extra emphasis is put on the festival goers aiming to expand ticket sales for the following year. The film crew is made up of about 200 editors, producers, and camera people. As of December 2024, Tomorrowland's YouTube channel has over 2.201.242.947 views and over 11.2 million subscribers. Elsewhere on social media, Tomorrowland has over 9.8 million followers on Instagram, and over 2.2 million followers on X.

The 2012 edition of Tomorrowland saw the debut of the Tomorrowland's Global Journey packages in partnership with Brussels Airlines. The package includes a weekend ticket in addition to flights and hotels and saw 25 flights carrying 2,000 passengers from 17 departure cities. 2013 saw a large increase in popularity for this package seeing 140 flights carrying 8,000 passengers from 67 cities with the top five flight destination being Basel, Tel Aviv, Geneva, Oslo, and London. Buyers of the Global Journey packages had the option to upgrade to party flights of which there were twenty; ten standard, eight with streamed music and two with live DJ sets. Previous Global Journey setlists have come from Dimitri Vegas & Like Mike, Yves V, and Romeo Blanco. Since 2017, Tomorrowland has been partnered with Dance FM UAE allowing live setlists from the festival and exclusive interviews with the performers to be broadcast on the station.

- YouTube Creator Awards
  (10.5 million subscribers - May 2023)

=== Employment and economic impact ===
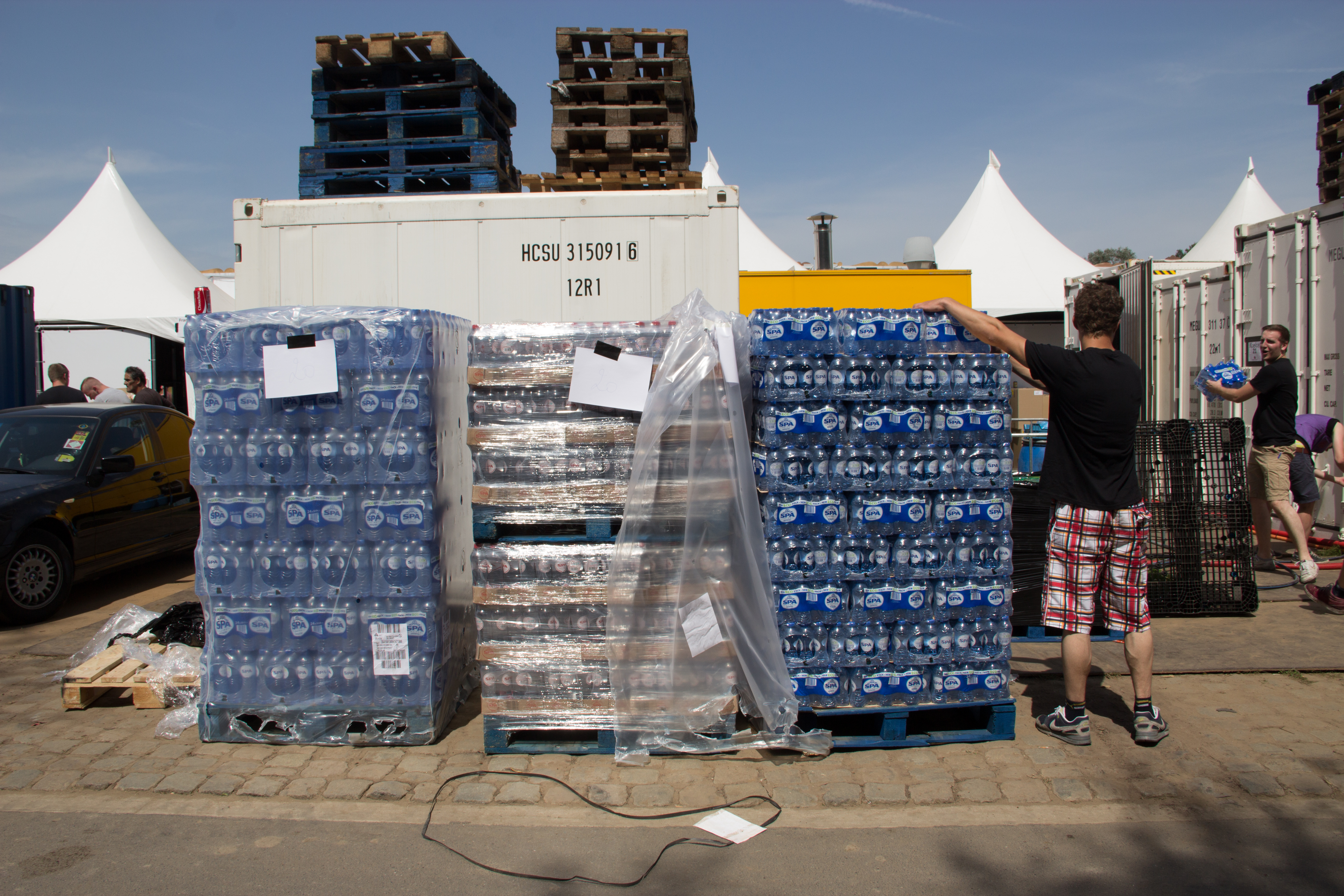
Festival workers supplying bottled water to the festival

Tomorrowland 2013 brought €70 million to the Belgian economy, €19 million of which was spent by people living outside of Belgium. In 2016, the festival brought €100 million and employed 700 people full-time before and during the festival. 2017 reported a similar value, again bringing €100 million to the local economy, but that year employing a reported 12,000 people during the festival. A crew of 12,000 was also employed for the 2018 edition. The 2019 edition saw an expanded crew, with 15,000 staff members employed, and was estimated to have made €20 million in profit.

== Spin-off festivals ==
=== TomorrowWorld ===
TomorrowWorld
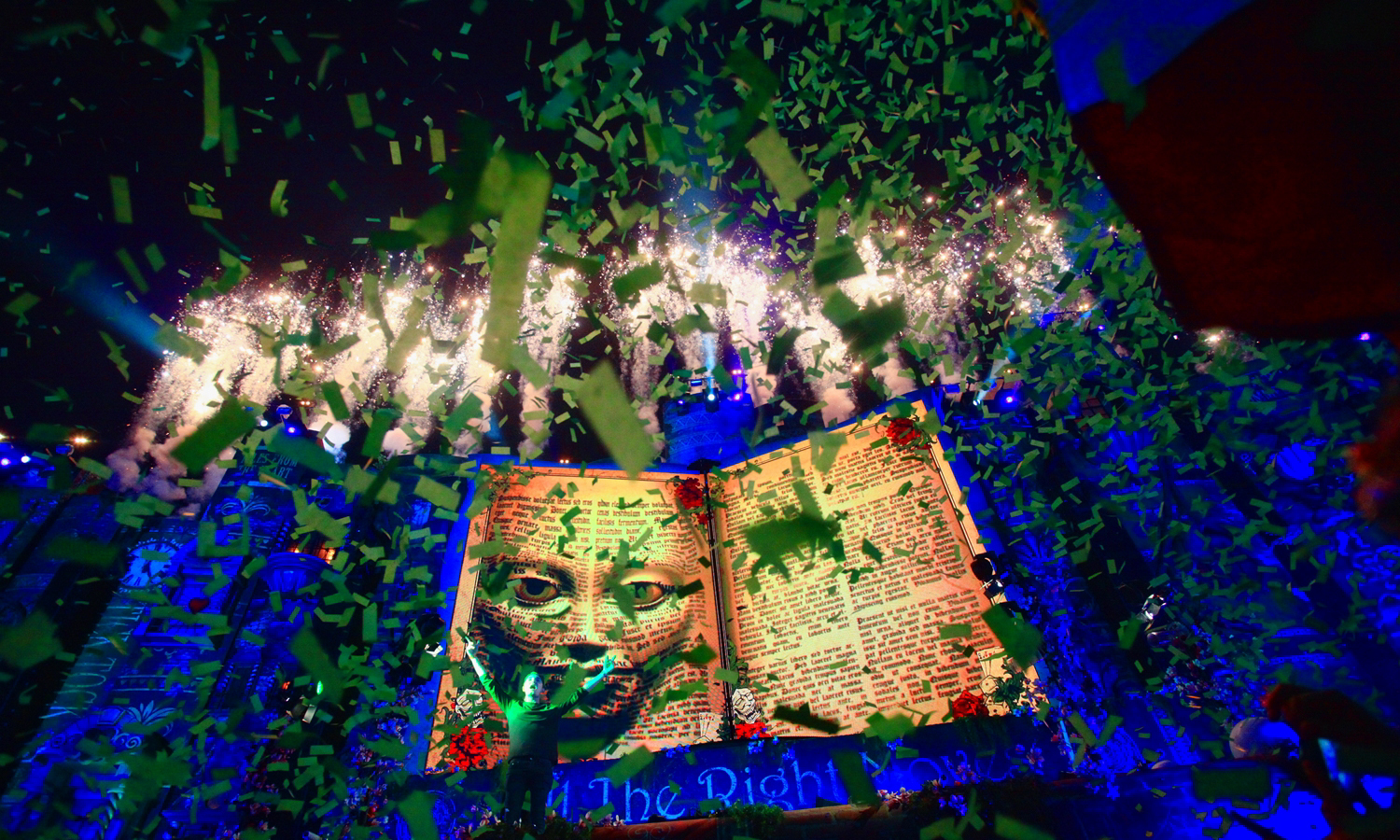
- "The Book of Wisdom" was the theme for TomorrowWorld 2013
- Genre: EDM
- Dates: Final weekend of September
- Location: Chattahoochee Hills, Georgia
- Years active: 2013–2015
- Organiser: ID&T North America

On 20 March 2013, ID&T Belgium and SFX Entertainment announced that they would begin organising an American spin-off of Tomorrowland, known as TomorrowWorld. The festival was held at the Bouckaert Farm in Chattahoochee Hills, Georgia, located 48 km (30 mi) south-west of Atlanta. The site was specifically chosen due to its resemblance to the Boom location in which Tomorrowland is traditionally held.

The inaugural edition of TomorrowWorld, held 27, 28, and 29 September 2013, reused the "Book of Wisdom" design used for the main stage at Tomorrowland in 2012. Nearly 140,000 attended the event over the weekend. Officials reported TomorrowWorld 2013 brought $85.1 million into the Georgia economy, including $70 million directly to Atlanta. That $70 million matches the impact the city got from hosting the NCAA Final Four in 2013. Moreover, the attendees' direct expenditures added $28.7 million into the local economy in areas such as lodging, restaurants and sight-seeing, TomorrowWorld officials said.

The 2014 edition of TomorrowWorld was held on 26, 27, and 28 September 2014. The theme was "The Arising of Life," and used the volcano main stage which debuted at Tomorrowland in 2013. The festival hosted a pre-festival concert called "The Gathering" on Thursday 25 September 2014 for attendees staying in Dreamville, the camp grounds of TomorrowWorld. Over 40,000 people camped at Dreamville, selling out the basic camping option. More than 160,000 people attended TomorrowWorld 2014.

The third and final edition of TomorrowWorld was held on the weekend of September 25, 26, and 27 2015. The event descended into chaos after being marred by inclement weather. Rain showers resulted in muddy terrain at the festival grounds, and entrance roadways to the grounds becoming unusable. On Saturday, due to the road conditions, organisers restricted shuttle service for attendees travelling back to Atlanta; those who were not stranded without shelter at the grounds overnight were required to hike miles towards areas where taxi cab and Uber drivers offered rides back to Atlanta at high prices. The following morning, festival organisers announced that the remainder of the festival would only be open to those who had camped on-site, and that refunds would be issued to those who were affected by the transport issues or had bought tickets for day 3.

On 2 March 2016, the official TomorrowWorld Facebook page announced that the festival would not be held in 2016.

=== Tomorrowland Brasil ===
Tomorrowland Brasil
- Genre: EDM
- Dates: First weekend of May (first edition); Third weekend of April (second edition); Second weekend of October (current editions).
- Locations: Parque Maeda, Itu, São Paulo, Brazil
- Years active: 2015–2016; 2023-present
- Organiser: Plus Talent (SFX) - 2015-2016; DC Set Group - 2023-present

As announced on 20 July 2014, by David Guetta's streamed Tomorrowland set to Brazil, and on the Tomorrowland website, the next edition to Tomorrowland Brasil was held on 1–3 May 2015 in Itu, São Paulo. Various DJ's performed such as W&W, Hardwell, Dimitri Vegas & Like Mike, Showtek, Steve Aoki, and many more main stage performers. Some of the stage hosts were Revealed Recordings, Dim Mak, Smash The House, Q-Dance, Super You & Me and many more. The mainstage again reused the "Book of Wisdom" theme. All 180,000 tickets sold out one day after being announced.

The second edition of Tomorrowland Brasil took place once again at Itu in São Paulo, Brazil, on 21–23 April 2016. The lineup included Axwell & Ingrosso, Ferry Corsten, Laidback Luke, Loco Dice, Markus Schulz, Afrojack, Alesso, Armin van Buuren, Chris Lake, Infected Mushroom, Nicky Romero, Dimitri Vegas & Like Mike, Solomun, Steve Angello, and many others.

In November 2016, it was announced that Tomorrowland Brasil would not return due to concerns over the country's economic instability.

In December 2022, after a six-year hiatus, a new edition of the event was confirmed for 12, 13 and 14 October 2023. The 2023 edition of Tomorrowland Brasil sold out in under three hours.

On Thursday, the first day of the 2023 edition, the festival was hit with bad weather. The grassy festival site turned into deep slippery mud and access roads collapsed due to the heavy traffic and large amounts of rainfall. To ensure safety, the second day of the festival was cancelled in order to get the event venue, Parque Maeda, and its access roads ready for the last festival day, Saturday. A replacement timetable was announced for festival visitors staying at Dreamville, the festival campsite, and a secondary stage was set up on the campsite, "stage 02".

In October 2024, the fourth edition of the festival took place in Brazil from October 11 to 13 at Parque Maeda in São Paulo. The event featured hundreds of DJs, including Afrojack, Armin Van Buuren, Hardwell, Boris Brejcha, Dimitri Vegas, and Timmy Trumpet, along with a special drone show by DJ Alok. The 2024 edition attracted over 150,000 attendees over the course of the three-day festival.

=== Tomorrowland Winter ===
Tomorrowland Winter
- Genre: EDM
- Dates: Second/Third week of March
- Locations: Alpe d'Huez, France
- Years active: 2019–
- Attendance: 22,000 (2023)
- Organiser: WEAREONE.world (WAOW)

In March 2018, Tomorrowland announced the coming of a new festival, Tomorrowland Winter, to take place annually during the second or third week in March in Alpe d'Huez in the French Alps.

The first Tomorrowland Winter took place between 13 and 15 March 2019, with 30,000 tickets selling and used the theme "The Hymn of the Frozen Lotus". It featured Martin Garrix, Dimitri Vegas & Like Mike, Armin van Buuren, Martin Solveig, Afrojack, DJ Snake, Steve Aoki and others. For the participants, the choice of 4 or 7 day passes were available for packages including accommodation and skiing.

On 13 August 2019, Tomorrowland announced that Tomorrowland Winter would return to the Alpe d'Huez for the 2020 edition which will be on the third week of March with ticket sales opening in September. On 5 March 2020, the French Government decided to cancel the 2020 edition due to the COVID-19 pandemic. On 6 October 2020, it was announced that the 2021 edition would also be cancelled due to the pandemic.

Tomorrowland made its return to Alpe d'Huez for the second edition of Tomorrowland Winter on 19–26 March 2022. However, the festival has since been mired in controversy because the second edition was scaled back with a much downsized festival arena and the outdoor main stage completely removed, instead replaced with a small mediocre marquee.

The third edition of Tomorrowland Winter welcomed 18,000 visitors and took place on 18–25 March 2023. The aftermovie was released on 26 April the same year. At the same time, the dates for the fourth edition were announced. As with 2022's edition, the Mainstage was smaller and indoor again with customer dissatisfaction continuing to build.

The fourth edition of Tomorrowland Winter will take place on 16–23 March 2024. The organisers announced the mainstage would be in a small marquee next to the local sports hall again, leading to widespread disappointment and falling ticket sales. Tomorrowland stated they were well aware of the disappointment but due to cost-cutting measures, had to put on a scaled back indoor version again.

In 2019 30,000 tickets sold out in less than 1 day. Comparatively, for the 2024 edition, due to widespread disappointment from 2022 and 2023's editions, the allocation of 18,000 tickets failed to sell out and it remains to be seen whether the festival will return post-2024 due to uncertainty around the financial liquidity of the parent organisation 'One World'.

In November 2023, the municipal council of Alpe d'Huez authorized the mayor of Alpe d'Huez, Jean-Yves Noyrey, to sign a contract with Tomorrowland providing, among other things, for the renewal of the festival for a further 5 editions (until 2030), the enlargement of the main stage to accommodate 2,000 people more, and the possible relocation of the ice rink and swimming pool.

==== Opposition ====
From the very first edition, in 2019, opposition has been voiced against the festival's arrival in Alpe d'Huez. France Nature Environnement accused the event of "folie des grandeurs", while environmentalists denounced its impact on the environment. On the cultural front, the Auvergne-Rhône-Alpes region's financial contribution of €400,000 to the project raised questions, leading to a tribune supported by dozens of signatories from the cultural world.

For the second edition, in 2022, the French militant movements PEPS (Pour une Écologie Populaire et Sociale) and Extinction Rebellion called for a demonstration in Bourg-d'Oisans against the festival during "La montée des Grelous ".

On October 12, 2023, opponents of the festival got together and launched the Stop Tomorrowland Alpe d'Huez collective at a public meeting in Grenoble. Its members denounced "a festival with disastrous ecological costs, financially disproportionate, reserved for a public with (very) high purchasing power, adding noise and visual disturbance to an already overcrowded mountain".

Ten days later, Pierre Janot, an ecologist regional consultant from the region Auvergne-Rhône-Alpes, publicly voiced his opposition to the festival, announcing that he had voted against a resolution granting a lump-sum subsidy of 50,000 euros to the commune of Alpe d'Huez, for the organization of the festival.

=== Tomorrowland Thailand ===
Tomorrowland Thailand
- Genre: EDM
- Dates: December 11-13
- Locations: Wisdom Valley, Pattaya, Thailand
- Years active: 2026–
- Attendance: TBA
- Organiser: WEAREONE.world (WAOW)

In January 2026, it was announced that Tomorrowland Thailand would be held later in the year as its first event in Asia, being hosted in the Wisdom Valley in Pattaya, Thailand from 11–13 December 2026. Tickets went on sale in March 2026, reportedly selling out within an hour.

=== Unity ===
In March 2025, Tomorrowland and U.S. promoter Insomniac announced that it would host a residency at Sphere in Las Vegas known as Unity; the event utilized the venue's spherical screen and sound system to present an "audiovisual journey through the imagination" inspired by Tomorrowland's themes and Insomniac's festival brands (including Electric Daisy Carnival and Beyond Wonderland among others), featuring "cinematic compositions and iconic dance anthems".

== Unite with Tomorrowland ==
Tomorrowland has also organised Unite with Tomorrowland events in other countries, which serve as a satellite link to the main event in Belgium featuring live streams from the festival with synchronised effects, joined by in-person headliners. Unite with Tomorrowland currently operates in the United Arab Emirates, Germany, Spain, Lebanon, Taiwan, Malta, South Korea, Greece, and Israel.

== Incidents ==
In 2015, the third edition of TomorrowWorld in Atlanta, GA was hit with bad weather. The festival site became inaccessible and the third festival day (Sunday) was subsequently cancelled for non-camping visitors.

On 29 July 2017, the Unite event in Parc de Can Zam, Barcelona, Spain, was cut short after the stage caught fire due to a "technical malfunction" causing over 22,000 people to be evacuated. Firefighters on the scene hypothesised that the fire was caused by a failed pyrotechnics display; however, this was never officially confirmed. Twenty five per cent of the stage was destroyed and twenty people were treated for minor injuries or anxiety.

In a statement, Tomorrowland said:

"Saturday night July 29th 2017, the UNITE Barcelona stage caught fire due to a technical malfunction. Thanks to the professional intervention of the authorities all 22.000 visitors were evacuated safely and without reports of injuries. Local authorities will follow up and continue the investigation together with the Spanish organisation of UNITE."

In 2019, after Weekend 1, The Freedom Stage ceiling went down due to extremely hot temperatures and too much weight on the ceiling, and it was kept closed for Weekend 2. The Freedom Stage was converted into an open-air stage outside the doors of the stage.

In 2023, during the Tomorrowland Brasil event, the festival was confronted with heavy rainfall during the first day and local infrastructure was insufficiently prepared for this. The second day was cancelled. In a press release, Tomorrowland said:

"Persistent, heavy rain and thunderstorms were posing lots of challenges and although the shows were able to continue, the venue, parking lots and access roads are too damaged and need to be restored. This night and morning, production crew worked with all their might to prepare the festival grounds. It is dry now, but additional time will be needed. The safety of the festivalgoers, crew and artists is the highest priority. Festival-goers staying at the campsite DreamVille will be taken care of and The Gathering will open with an alternative program today. Refund information will follow soon. Every effort will be made so that the venue can reopen to all festival-goers on Saturday 14 October."

On 16 July 2025, two days before the opening day of that year's festival, the main stage was destroyed by a fire; the organisers said the festival would continue without the stage and nobody was injured, although some residents of nearby homes were evacuated over fears the fire would spread. On 18 July 2025, a smaller mainstage was constructed with an announcement stating that the main stage will open at the originally planned time on the same day.

== Awards and nominations ==
=== DJ Awards ===
Year	Category	Work	Result	Ref.
2012	Best International Dance Music Festival	Tomorrowland	Won	

=== DJ Magazine ===
Year	Category	Work	Result	Ref.
2015	World's Best Festival	Tomorrowland - Boom, Belgium	Won (Note: From 2015 to 2017, only winners were chosen. From 2019, the award entered a chart format.)	
2019	World's Best Festival	Tomorrowland - Boom, Belgium	1st	
2020	World's Best Festival	Tomorrowland - Boom, Belgium	No Poll	
2021	World's Best Festival	Tomorrowland - Boom, Belgium	No Poll	
2022	World's Best Festival	Tomorrowland - Boom, Belgium	1st	

=== European Festivals Awards ===
Year	Category	Work	Result	Ref.
2009	Best Major Festival	Tomorrowland (Belgium)	Nominated	
2010	Best Major Festival	Tomorrowland (Belgium)	Nominated	
2011	Best Major Festival	Tomorrowland (Belgium)	Nominated	
2012	Best Major Festival	Tomorrowland (Belgium)	Won	
2013	Best Major Festival	Tomorrowland (Belgium)	Nominated	
2014	Best Major Festival	Tomorrowland (Belgium)	Nominated	
2015	Best Major Festival	Tomorrowland (Belgium)	Nominated	
2016	Best Major Festival	Tomorrowland (Belgium)	Nominated	
2017	Best Major Festival	Tomorrowland (Belgium)	Nominated	

=== Electronic Music Awards ===
Year	Category	Work	Result	Ref.
2017	Festival of the Year	Tomorrowland - Boom, Belgium	Nominated	

=== Festicket Awards ===
Year	Category	Work	Result	Ref.
2016	Best EDM/Dance Festival	Tomorrowland	1st	

=== International Dance Music Awards ===
==== Pre-2016 ====
Year	Category	Work	Result	Ref.
2011	Best Music Event	Tomorrowland - Boom, Belgium	Nominated	
2012	Best Music Event	Tomorrowland - Boom, Belgium	Won	
2013	Best Music Event	Tomorrowland - Boom, Belgium	Won	
2014	Best Music Event	Tomorrowland - Boom, Belgium	Won	
2015	Best Music Event	Tomorrowland - Boom, Belgium	Won	
2016	Best Music Event	Tomorrowland - Boom, Belgium	Won	

==== 2018-Present ====
Note (Note: No award ceremony was held in 2017. In 2018 winners were chosen by the Winter Music Conference themselves. 2019 marks the first year of public voting since the Winter Music Conference's restructure.)

Year	Category	Work	Result	Ref.
2019	Best Festival	Tomorrowland	Won	
2020	Best Festival	Tomorrowland	Won	

=== MTV Europe Music Awards ===
Year	Category	Work	Result	Ref.
2015	Best World Stage	Tomorrowland	Nominated	
2016	Best World Stage	Tomorrowland	Nominated	
2017	Best World Stage	Tomorrowland	Nominated	

=== Red Bull Elektropedia Awards ===
Year	Category	Work	Result	Ref.
2011	Best Festival	Tomorrowland	Won	
2012	Best Festival	Tomorrowland	Won	
2013	Best Festival	Tomorrowland	Won	

=== UK Festival Awards ===
Year	Category	Work	Result	Ref.
2014	Best overseas Festival	Tomorrowland (Belgium)	Won	

=== Others ===
In 2023 Tomorrowland was granted an honorary star in Nirvana Studios - Wall of Fame.

== See also ==
- List of electronic music festivals
