= TomorrowWorld =

Annual electronic music festival

Coordinates: 33.6361338°N 84.7075252°W

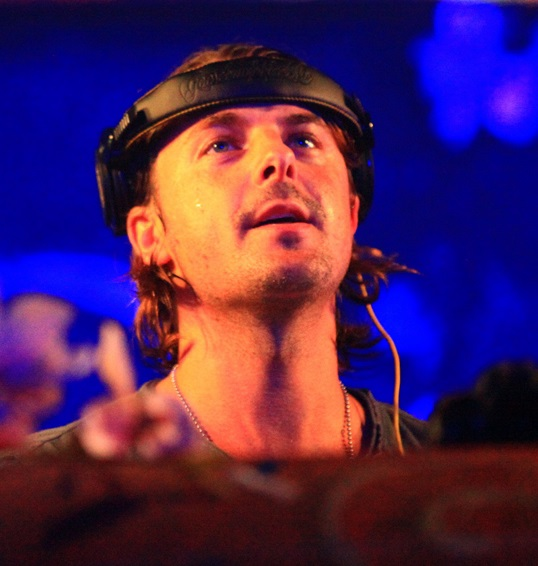
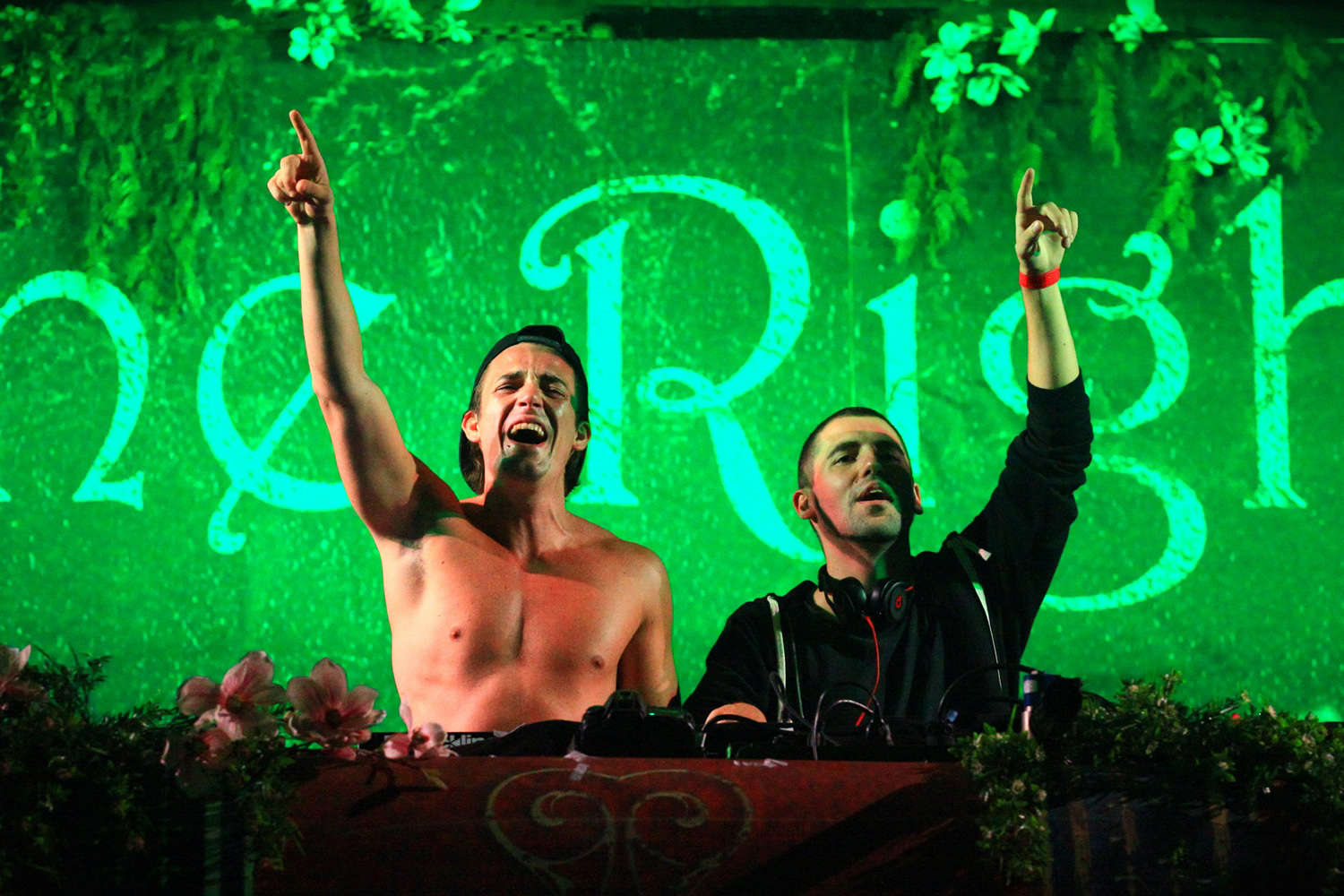
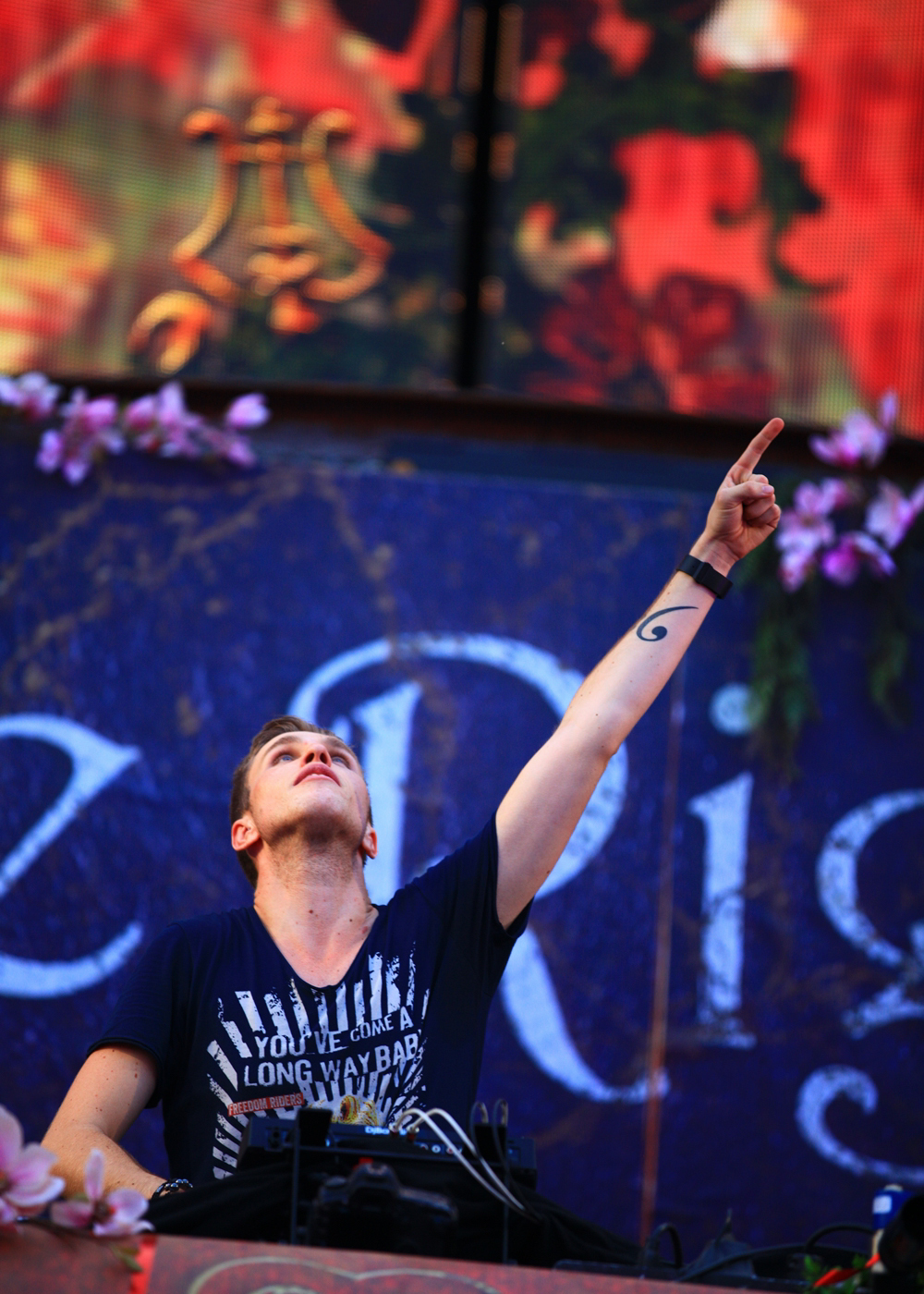
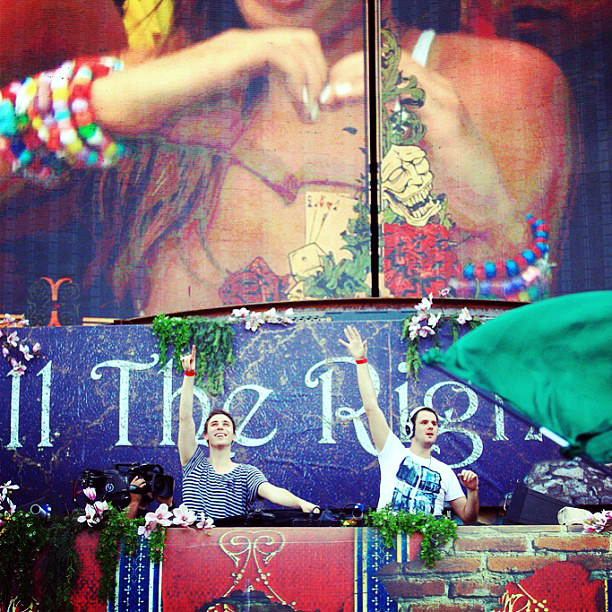
- Clockwise from top left: Axwell, Dimitri Vegas & Like Mike, W&W, Nicky Romero at TomorrowWorld 2013
- Genre: EDM
- Locations: Chattahoochee Hills, Georgia
- Years active: 2013–2015
- Organiser: ID&T
- Website: Official site

TomorrowWorld was an electronic music festival, held in the Atlanta metropolitan area within the town of Chattahoochee Hills, Georgia. Held from 2013 to 2015, the festival was a spinoff of the Belgian festival Tomorrowland. The festival was owned by LiveStyle, Inc. (formerly known as SFX Entertainment, Inc.) and organized and produced by EDM promoter ID&T, a wholly owned subsidiary of LiveStyle. In its inaugural year, TomorrowWorld received a nomination for Best Music Event at the International Dance Music Awards. The festival did not return in 2016 due to the bankruptcy of the SFX entertainment and also the backlash event organizers received due to weather-related and logistical issues during the 2015 edition.

== History ==
=== 2013 ===
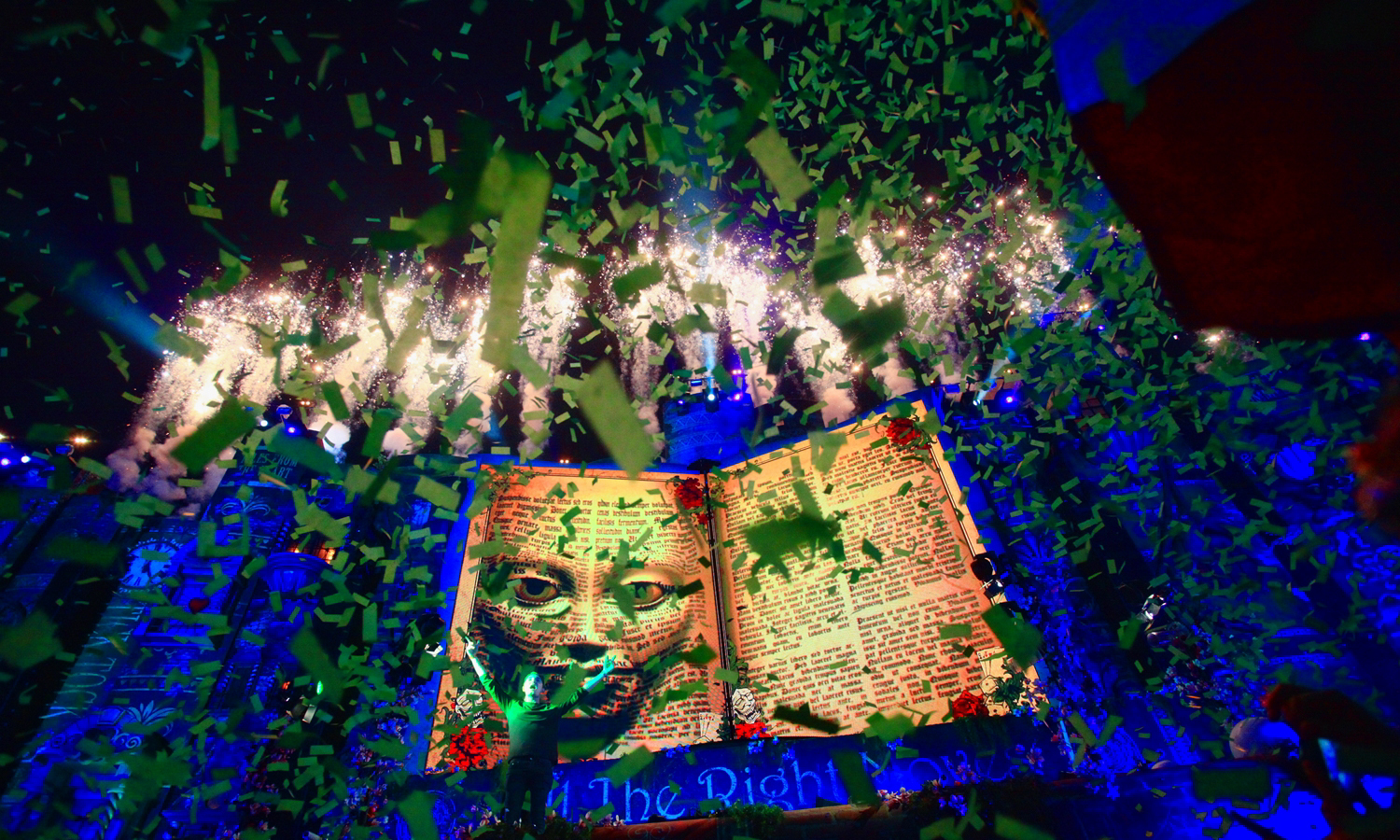
"The Book of Wisdom", used as the Tomorrowland 2012 theme, was used again for TomorrowWorld 2013

In March 2013, Barnette Group, ID&T and SFX Entertainment announced that it would start holding an American spin-off of Tomorrowland, known as TomorrowWorld. The festival is held at Chattahoochee Hills, near Atlanta, Georgia. The site was specifically chosen due to its resemblance to Boom, Belgium, where Tomorrowland is traditionally held. To symbolize TomorrowWorld as the "next chapter" of the Tomorrowland festival franchise, the inaugural edition would re-use the "Book of Wisdom" main stage design that was used for the previous Tomorrowland in 2012.

Given TomorrowWorld was the first EDM event following two deaths at New York's Electric Zoo Festival, ticket sales were slower than expected overall. Adding the unconventional location and a higher age restriction of 21, industry insiders feared a potential flop. Nevertheless, TomorrowWorld had a successful inaugural edition without incidents. During the final week of September of that year, over 140,000 people gathered at Chattahoochee Hills, near Atlanta, Georgia to listen to the likes of Armin van Buuren, Tiësto, Hardwell and more than 300 other EDM artists performing on eight different stages. Nearly 30,000 individuals stayed on site at the TomorrowWorld campground, known as Dreamville.

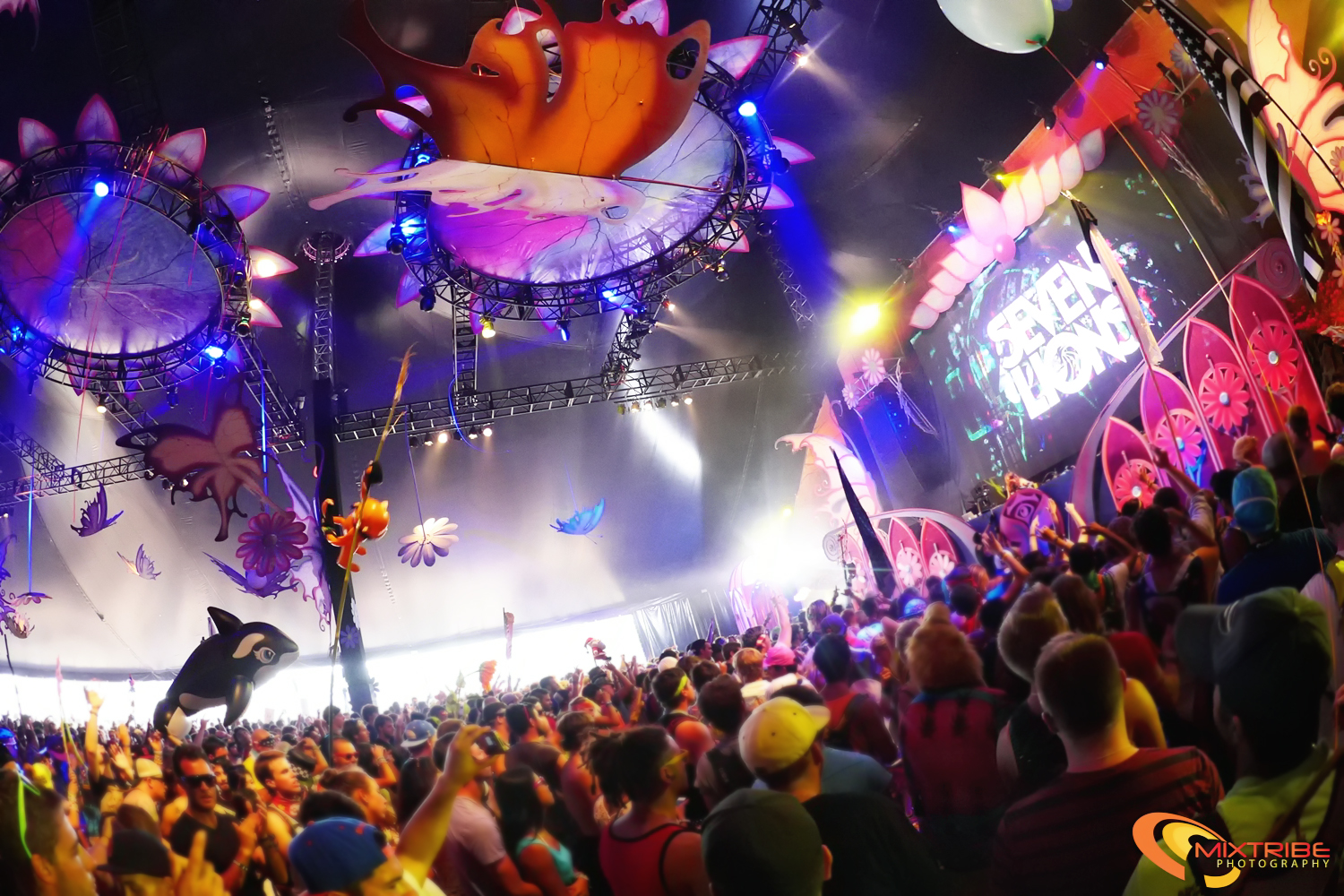
One of the indoor stages at the festival

=== 2014 ===
The second edition of TomorrowWorld happened in September 2014, and brought a larger crowd with 150,000 attendees. An innovation was employing only cashless transactions, done by the same radio-frequency identification wristbands that served as entry tickets.

The first two editions of Tomorrowworld were billed as a Chattahoochee Hills event, despite being held just outside the city limits. On April 1, 2015, the City of Chattahoochee Hills annexed 4,920 acres of land, including the property that hosts Tomorrowworld. This meant that the festival would then be held inside the Chattahoochee Hills city limits. In addition to annexing the Tomorrowworld property, the Chattahoochee Hills City Council also unanimously approved a land use permit allowing for the event to be held until 2025. Carl Bouckaert, the owner of the land where Tomorrowworld is held, asked the City Council to approve his land use permit as a part of the annexation petition.

=== 2015 ===
The third edition of TomorrowWorld was held on the weekend of September 25, 2015. The event was marred by inclement weather; rain showers resulted in muddy terrain at the festival grounds, and entrance roadways to the grounds becoming unusable. On Saturday, due to the road conditions, organizers restricted shuttle service for attendees travelling back to Atlanta; those who were not outright stranded without shelter at the grounds overnight were required to hike miles towards areas where taxicab and Uber drivers offered rides back to Atlanta at high prices. The following morning, festival organizers announced that the remainder of the festival would only be open to those who had camped on-site, and that refunds would be issued to those who were affected by the transport issues or had bought tickets for day 3.

=== Discontinuation ===
The fate of the 2016 edition was left in question due to the February 2016 bankruptcy filing of SFX, as well as the weather issues experienced in 2015. On March 2, 2016, SFX officially announced that TomorrowWorld 2016 had been cancelled.

=== Edition's summary ===
Year	Dates	Attendance	Theme
2013	27, 28, 29 September	140,000	The Book of Wisdom
2014	26, 27, 28 September	150,000	The Arising of Life
2015	25, 26, 27 September	150,000	The Key to Happiness

== Economic impact ==
A study commissioned by TomorrowWorld organizers concluded that the festival had an economic impact on the metro Atlanta area equivalent to the $70 million generated for the city during the 2013 NCAA Final Four. Independent research firm Beacon Economics reported in its study that visiting attendees' direct expenditures added $28.7 million into the local economy across areas such as lodging, restaurants, sight-seeing, etc. An estimated $4.3 million in tax revenues went to state and local governments as a result of event-related spending for TomorrowWorld 2013. This would be the equivalent of hiring 80 full-time school teachers for one year at a salary of $53,000. Labor income for workers in metro Atlanta and the greater state of Georgia increased by $34 million thanks to the direct and indirect work needed to support the influx of people and increased business from the event. TomorrowWorld employed the equivalent of 749 annual full-time jobs.

The second edition was also a financial success. SFX's profits were $10 million higher compared to the first TomorrowWorld, allowing the company to recover from net losses during the second quarter of 2014.

== Awards and nominations ==
Year	Awards	Category	Result	Ref.
2014	International Dance Music Awards	Best Music Event	Nominated	

== See also ==
- List of electronic music festivals
