= Barcelona Beach Festival =

Electronic music festival held annually in Platja del Fòrum, Barcelona

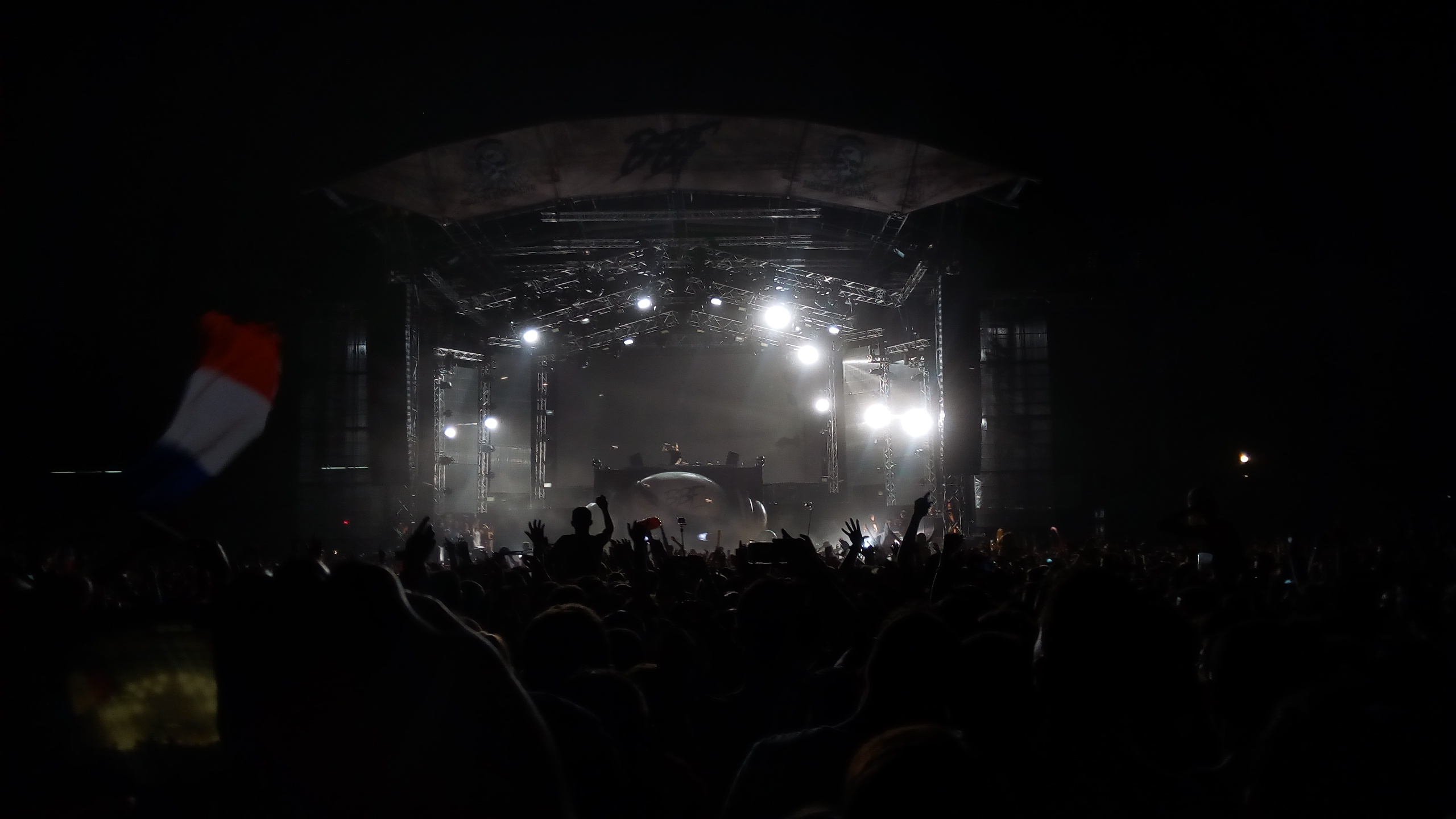
Martin Garrix at Barcelona Beach Festival 2016

Barcelona Beach Festival is an electronic music festival that was held annually in Platja del Fòrum, Barcelona. It is organized by Live Nation and it is estimated that more than 70,000 people attend annually. It is one of the biggest music festivals in Spain. Recent performers include David Guetta, Armin van Buuren, DJ Snake and Dimitri Vegas & Like Mike.

In 2024, it was announced that the festival would move to Madrid.

== Venue ==
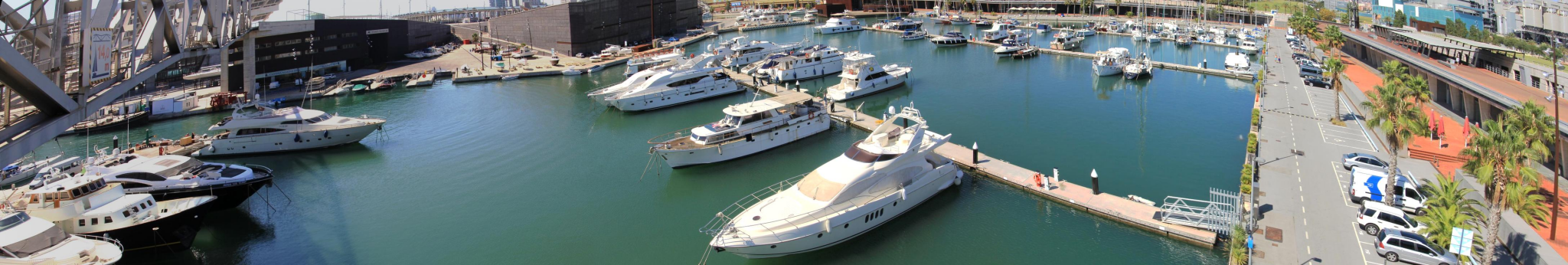
Port next to the venue at Sant Adrià de Besòs

Platja del Fòrum is a beach located next to the port and the Port Fòrum marina, in the north of Barcelona. The sea views provide an incredible backdrop, with the city center within walking distance.

In 2024, the event was held at IFEMA Madrid Fairgrounds.

== Editions and artists ==
=== 2014 ===
National DJs

- Fonsi Nieto
- Marsal Ventura
- Sergi Domene
- Alex de Guirior
- Quique Tejada
- Joan Reyes
- Oliver Schmit
- JP Candela
- Brian Cross
- Juan Magan
- The Zombie Kids

International DJs

- David Guetta
- Avicii
- Steve Angello

=== 2015 ===
National DJs

- Marsal Ventura
- Sergi Domene
- Quique Tejada
- Brian Cross
- The Zombie Kids

International DJs

- David Guetta
- Axwell /\ Ingrosso
- Hardwell
- Martin Garrix

=== 2016 ===
National DJs

- Jordi Véliz
- Sergi Domene
- Quique Tejada
- Brian Cross
- JP Candela

International DJs

- David Guetta
- Axwell /\ Ingrosso
- Hardwell
- Martin Garrix
- Ruby Rose
- Sander Van Doorn
- Nicky Romero
- Alesso

=== 2017 ===
National DJs

- Jordi Véliz
- Marsal Ventura
- Dj Neil
- Brian Cross
- JP Candela
- Joswerk

International DJs

- Dimitri Vegas & Like Mike
- Kygo
- Axwell /\ Ingrosso
- Hardwell
- Martin Garrix
- Armin van Buuren
- Lost Frequencies
- Kittens

=== 2018 ===
National DJs

- Xavi Alfaro
- Sergi Domene
- Jordi Vèliz
- Javi Reina
- Abel The Kid
- The Tripletz
- JP Candela
- Brian Cross

International DJs

- Robin Schulz
- Oliver Heldens
- Don Diablo
- David Guetta
- The Chainsmokers
- Axwell /\ Ingrosso
- Armin van Buuren
- Tom Staar

=== 2019 ===
National DJs

- Brian Cross
- DJ Nano
- JP Candela
- Dgrace
- Uri Farre
- Xavi Alfaro
- Sergi Domene
- Jordi Vèliz

International DJs

- Alesso
- Armin van Buuren
- David Guetta
- DJ Snake
- Dimitri Vegas & Like Mike
- Don Diablo
- Steve Aoki
- W&W
- DJ Pelos
- Jerry Davila

=== 2020 (Cancelled by COVID-19 pandemic) ===
Headliners

- Alan Walker
- Armin van Buuren
- Dimitri Vegas & Like Mike
- Marshmello
- Steve Aoki
- Sunnery James & Ryan Marciano
- Timmy Trumpet
- W&W

Other DJs

- Brian Cross & DJ Nano
- DJ Pelos & Jerry Davila
- JP Candela & Alex Now
- Albert Neve

=== 2022 ===
Headliners

- Armin van Buuren
- Dimitri Vegas & Like Mike
- Don Diablo
- Marshmello
- Morten
- Sunnery James & Ryan Marciano
- Timmy Trumpet
- Vini Vici

Special Guest

- Brian Cross B2B Yves V
- Chelina Manuhutu
- Gonçalo

Support Acts

- Abel Ramos X Albert Neve
- Dgrace & JP Candela
- DJ Neil
- Alex Now
- Sergi Domene

=== 2024 ===
Headliners

- Armin van Buuren
- Claptone
- Hardwell
- Korolova
- Martin Garrix
- Sam Feldt

Support Acts

- Fast Boy
- Brian Cross B2B DJ Nano
- Gonçalo & Groove Amigos
- Joyse & Dgrace & Alex Now
- Vickman Romero & Mike Sildavia
