= Wolfpack (DJs) =

Belgian DJ

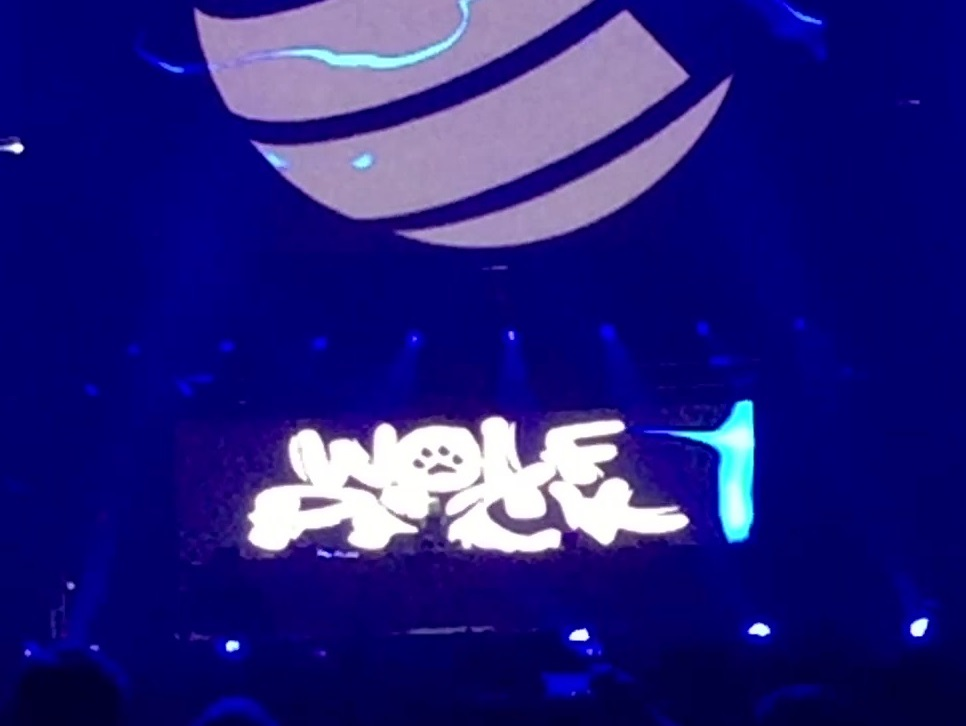

Background information
- Origin: Willebroek, Belgium
- Genres: Progressive house; electro house; big room house
- Years active: 2011–present
- Label: Smash the House
- Members: Steve Braet; Ruben Khaza
- Website: www.wolfpackdj.com/

Wolfpack is a Belgian DJ and production duo from Willebroek, formed in 2011.

== Biography ==
Wolfpack members Steve Braet and Ruben Khaza are from Willebroek, near the DJ duo Dimitri Vegas & Like Mike.

Wolfpack produces electro house music through the label Smash The House (sub-label Spinnin' Records). They reached #1 in Beatport's top 100 with the singles "Turn It Up" (with Dimitri Vegas & Like Mike, GTA) and "Ocarina" (with Dimitri Vegas & Like Mike).

== Awards and nominations ==
2014	TOP 100 DJ'S	WOLFPACK	84
2015	TOP 100 DJ'S	WOLFPACK	52
2016	TOP 100 DJ'S	WOLFPACK	63
2017	TOP 100 DJ'S	WOLFPACK	41
2018	35		

== Discography ==
=== Charting singles ===
Year	Title	Peak chart positions												Album
Year	Title	AUS	AUT	BEL (Vl)	BEL (Wa)	FIN	FRA	GER	IRL	NLD	SWE	SWI	UK	Album
2011	"Rising Moon"	—	—	5^{[A]}	—	—	—	—	—	—	—	—	—	Non-album singles
2013	"Miracle" (featuring Coco Star)	—	—	37^{[B]}	3^{[C]}	—	—	—	—	—	—	—	—	Non-album singles
2013	"Turn It Up" (Dimitri Vegas & Like Mike and GTA featuring Wolfpack)	—	—	2^{[A]}	—	—	—	—	—	—	—	—	—	Non-album singles
2013	"Find Tomorrow (Ocarina)" (Dimitri Vegas & Like Mike featuring Wolfpack and Katy B)	—	—	2	13	—	—	—	—	—	—	—	—	Non-album singles
2014	"How I Feel" (Wolfpack Remix) (Flo Rida featuring Wolfpack)	—	—	44^{[B]}	—	—	—	—	—	—	—	—	—	Non-album singles
2016	"Phatt Bass 2016" (with Warp Brothers)	—	—	9^{[A]}	—	—	—	—	—	—	—	—	—	Non-album singles
2016	"GO!" (Dimitri Vegas & Like Mike Remix) (vs. Avancada)	—	—	16^{[A]}	—	—	—	—	—	—	—	—	—	Non-album singles
"—" denotes a recording that did not chart or was not released in that territory.

=== Singles and extended plays ===
- 2012: Rising Moon [Smash The House]
- 2013: Miracle (with Dimitri Vegas & Like Mike Remix) [Smash The House]
- 2013: Turn It Up (with Dimitri Vegas & Like Mike vs. GTA) [Musical Freedom]
- 2013: Ocarina (The TomorrowWorld Anthem) (with Dimitri Vegas & Like Mike) [Smash The House]
- 2014: H.A.M. (with Ale Mora) [Smash The House]
- 2014: Jump (with Bobby Puma) [Smash The House]
- 2014: Sirens [Dim Mak Records]
- 2014: We Are One (with We Are Loud) [Smash The House]
- 2014: What Does This Button Do (with Aarow) [Smash The House]
- 2015: Drop The Smiley (with Funk D featuring Fatman Scoop) [Smash The House]
- 2015: You (with DIMARO) [Free Download/Smash The House]
- 2015: Wallcreeper (with Jimmy Clash) [Free Download/Smash The House]
- 2016: Phatt Bass 2016 (with Warp Brothers) [Smash The House]
- 2016: Light the Sky (with Regi featuring Alessia) [Mostiko]
- 2016: GO! (with Avancada) (Dimitri Vegas & Like Mike Remix) [Smash The House]
- 2016: Nashville (with Diego Miranda) [Smash The House]
- 2016: Loknez (with BOOSTEDKIDS) [Smash The House]
- 2017: Point Break (with Diego Miranda) [Smash The House]
- 2017: Cactus (with Futuristic Polar Bears featuring X-Tof) [Smash The House]
- 2017: Like Air (with NERVO) [Got Me Baby! Records]
- 2017: Destiny (with Futuristic Polar Bears featuring Shurakano) [Smash The House]
- 2018: Moksha (with Futuristic Polar Bears) [Cmmd Records]
- 2018: Riot (featuring Exploits, Leo, and Nweli)
- 2018: Zero Fs Given (with Bassjackers) [Smash The House]
- 2018: Derb (with Futuristic Polar Bears) [Smash The House]
- 2019: Apache (with Eastblock Bitches) [Smash The House]
- 2019: We Got This (with 22 Bullets) (Futuristic Polar Bears Edit) [Cmmd Records]
- 2019: Unleash The Beast (with Tony Junior) [Smash The House]
- 2019: Elev8 (with Diego Miranda featuring Fatman Scoop) [Smash The House]
- 2019: Tear Me Apart [Smash The House]
- 2019: Be Strong (with Vinny featuring Joshua Khane) [Smash The House]
- 2019: Arabian Bounce (with X-TOF, Fatman Scoop and Mike Bond) [Smash The House]
- 2019: Carnival (with Timmy Trumpet and Mattn) (Dimitri Vegas & Like Mike Edit) [Smash The House]
- 2020: Lord Of The Rave (with Futuristic Polar Bears and Nick Havsen) [Smash The House/Generation Smash]
- 2020: Moving Mountains (featuring Jonathan Mendelsohn) [Smash The House]
- 2020: Old Money (with Bassjackers featuring Richie Loop) [Smash The House]
- 2020: Make Some Noise (with Mike Bond and Fatman Scoop) [Smash The House]
- 2020: Sound The Alarm (with Richie Loop and Jimmy Clash) [Smash The House]
- 2020: Halloween (with Bassjackers and Baba Yega) [Smash The House]
- 2020: Kalahari (with Jaxx & Vega) [Smash The House]
- 2021: By My Side (with Jerry Dávila featuring Jonathan Mendelsohn) [Smash The House]
- 2021: Superstar (with Angemi and Flaremode) [Smash The House/Smash Deep]
- 2021: Gotta Tell You (with Vinny and Dennis Cartier featuring Adannay) [Smash The House]
- 2021: Universe (with Alchimyst) [Smash The House]
- 2023: Curura (with Jaxx & Vega and DJ Junior) [Smash The House]
- 2023: When I Wake Up (with Futuristic Polar Bears and Chris Burke) [Smash The House]

=== Remixes ===
- 2012: Ginuwine, Timbaland and Missy Elliott - Get Involved (Wolfpack Remix) [Smash The House]
- 2012: Regi and Dimitri Vegas & Like Mike - Momentum (Yves V and Wolfpack Remix) [Smash The House]
- 2013: Dimitri Vegas & Like Mike, Steve Aoki, and Angger Dimas - Phat Brahms (Wolfpack Remix) [Dim Mak Records]
- 2013: Nicolaz and Angelika Vee - Riot (Wolfpack Remix) [Wooha!]
- 2013: Rohmir - Seal Me (Wolfpack Remix) [RBMC Music]
- 2014: Flo Rida - How I Feel (Wolfpack Instrumental Mix) [Poe Boy/Atlantic]
- 2015: Dimitri Vegas & Like Mike - Wakanda (Wolfpack Remix) [Musicheads Electro]
- 2015: Nervo - It Feels (Wolfpack Remix) [Ultra]
- 2015: Dvbbs - White Clouds (Wolfpack Remix) [Spinnin' Remixes]
- 2017: Dimitri Vegas & Like Mike, David Guetta, and Kiiara - Complicated (Diego Miranda and Wolfpack Remix)
