= Sunbeam (band) =

German trance band

- Also known as: Chrome & Price; Iron Wobble; System Faith; Plastic Pete
- Origin: Germany
- Genres: Trance, hard trance, electro
- Years active: 1993-present
- Labels: Kontor Records; Armada Music
- Members: Michael Gerlach; Florian Preis
- Website: www.sunbeam.de

Sunbeam is a German electronic music project. The band consists of Florian Preis (born 1972 in Bensheim) and Michael Gerlach (born 1973 in Tehran). Since 1992, they have made progressive dance/trance-productions and remixes.

Their biggest hit "Outside World" (1994) contains two vocal samples from the anime film Akira ("You know we aren't meant to exist in the outside world" and "I came to get you").

== Discography ==
=== 1994 ===
- E.P. of High Adventure (CD)
- Outside World E.P. (vinyl/single)
- Outside World (Mixes) (vinyl/single)
- Sunbeam EP (vinyl in Italy)

=== 1995 ===
- Love is Paradise (vinyl/single)
- Out of Reality (CD/album - USA only)

=== 1996 ===
- Arms Of Heaven (vinyl/single)

=== 1997 ===
- Dreams (vinyl/single)
- Out of Reality (US-album)

=== 1998 ===
- Lost In Music (promo-vinyl)

=== 1999 ===
- Outside World (vinyl/single)

=== 2000 ===
- Versus (Tomcraft vs. Sunbeam) (vinyl/single)
- Wake Up (vinyl/single)

=== 2001 ===
- Do It (vinyl/single)
- One Minute In Heaven (vinyl/single)
- Lightyears (album)

=== 2003 ===
- Watching the Stars (vinyl)

=== 2004 ===
- Low Gravity (vinyl)

=== 2019 ===
- Outside World (with Le Shuuk)
