= Jonathan Mendelsohn (singer) =

American singer

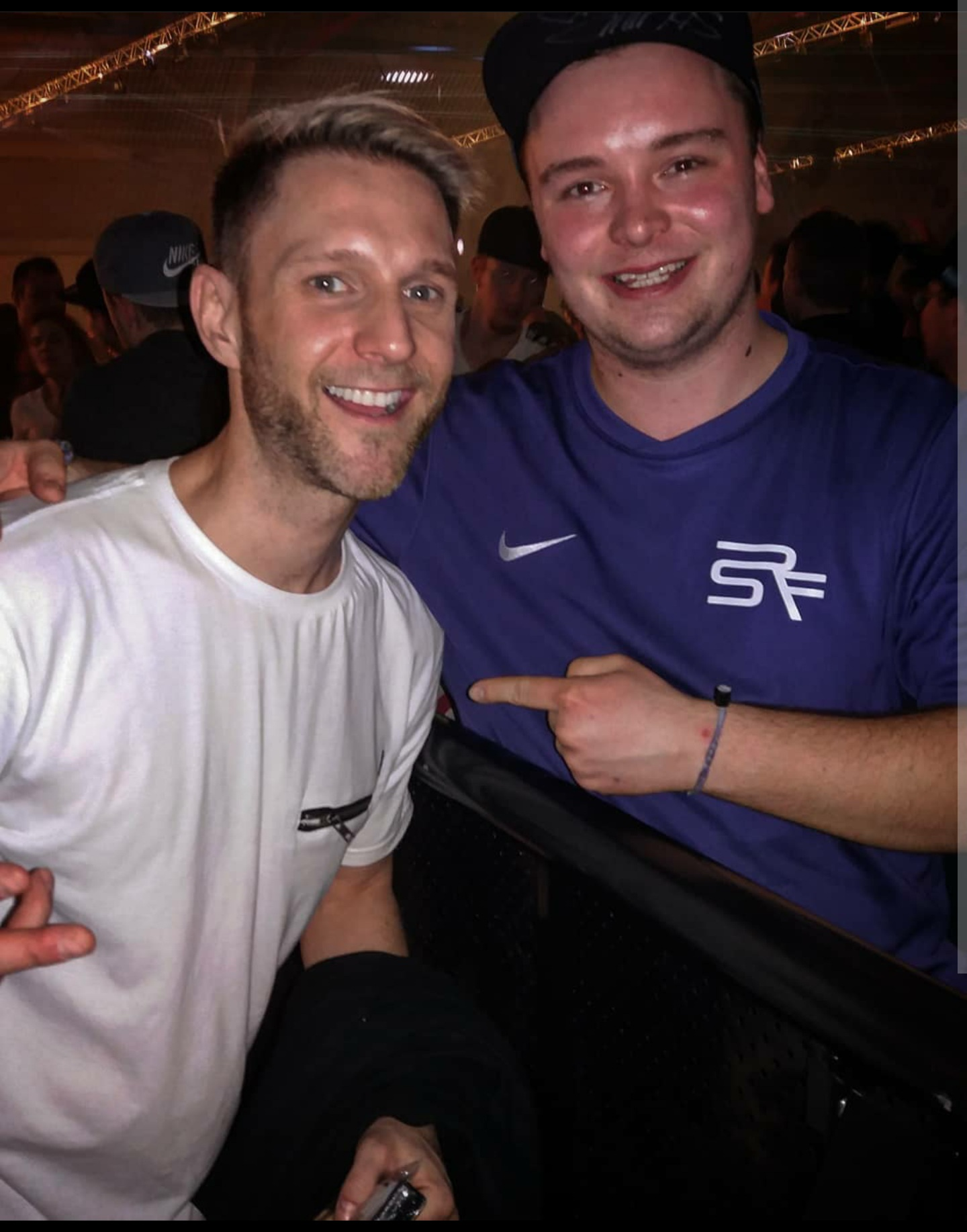
- Jonathan Mendelsohn (left) at I AM Hardstyle
- Born: June 19, 1980 (age 46); Brooklyn, New York City, U.S.
- Occupations: Singer, songwriter
- Years active: 2008–present
- Musical career
- Genres: Pop; EDM; Trance; Hardstyle; Bigroom; Progressive house
- Labels: Revealed Recordings; Armada; WE R

Jonathan Mendelsohn (born 19 June 1980) is an American singer and songwriter. He has worked with EDM DJs such as Hardwell, Brennan Heart and Blasterjaxx. Their collaborations "We Are Legends", "Imaginary" and "Ghost In The Machine" held the number one position on the respective Beatport Top 100, while the song "Till Tonight" with Laidback Luke was ranked in the Dutch national charts. Also two tracks with Dash Berlin received a nomination for 'Best Trance Track' at the IDMA's.

== Early life ==
Mendelsohn was born in Brooklyn, New York City, and raised in Upstate New York.He began writing songs at the age of 10 after learning chord progressions from his mother, a music teacher and pianist.. He cites Top 40 radio as a major musical influence and Mariah Carey, Whitney Houston and George Michael as inspiration for developing his own vocal style, before discovering electronic music in the NYC Rave scene in the late 90’s In 2002, Mendelsohn was the season finale winner of 'Amateur Night' at the Apollo Theater, One of his first musical releases was with producer Chris Brann of Wamdue Project called “Forgiveness” the release attracted the attention of Sony executives, and Mendelsohn was subsequently signed to Sony BMG. shortly after, but a change in executive leadership led to his release from the label before his debut could be launched.

== Career in electronic dance music ==
Mendelsohn's first significant international release was "This Moment", a collaboration with Claus Terhoeven, one half of Cosmic Gate, under his Nic Chagall alias. Released in 2009, the track was featured multiple times on Armin van Buuren's A State of Trance radio show, and was later included on the Universal Religion Chapter 4 mix compilation.

In 2013, Mendelsohn did the vocals for the song "Imaginary" by Brennan Heart. It was part of the Defqon.1 endshow and got released on Brennan Heart's album "Evolution of Style". The song held the number one position on the Hard Dance Beatport Charts and was ranked in the Top 100 for 777 days. It was voted as best hardstyle track of the year by Q-dance. In 2019, "Imaginary" was certified gold in the Netherlands, and achieved the platinum award in 2022.

In 2015 Mendelsohn was featured in Hardwell's album "United We Are" with the collaboration "Echo". It was released as a single later that year and was ranked #1 on the Dutch iTunes charts and #2 worldwide.

Starting 2017 Mendelsohn worked together with Swedish producer Kaaze. Their collaboration with Hardwell "We Are Legends" was released on the Hardwell & Friends EP Vol.1 and was ranked #1 in the Bigroom Beatport Charts. Two more collaborations followed on Revealed Recordings in 2017 and 2019.

== Discography ==
Year	Title	Producer	Label	Genre
2008	King Of My Castle	Wamdue Project	Pacha	Progressive house
2009	Forgiveness	Wamdue Project	Fierce Angel	House
2009	This Moment	Nic Chagall	High Contrast	Trance
2010	Till Tonight	Laidback Luke	Mixmash	Trance
2010	Timebomb	Laidback Luke	Mixmash	Progressive House
2010	Coming Back	Marco V	In Charge	Trance
2010	Love We Got	Laurent Wolf	Wolf Project	Electro House
2011	Walking Away	Chris Kaeser	House And Love	Progressive House
2011	Better Half Of Me	Dash Berlin	Aropa	Trance
2011	Wonderful	World Sketch	Roth Project	House
2011	Never Letting Go	World Sketch	Roth Project	House
2011	Ready To Love	World Sketch	Roth Project	House
2011	You Just Don't Love Me	David Morales	Ultra	Progressive House
2011	Bring Me Back	Dennis Shepherd	High Contrast	Trance
2012	Something For Everybody	Cazwell, Get Far, DAB	Melodica	Progressive House
2012	Where Did You Go	Morgan Page, Andy Caldwell	Nettwerk	Pop
2012	World Falls Apart	Dash Berlin	Aropa	Trance
2012	Back To Me	Jody Wisternoff	Anjunadeep	Deep House
2012	Out Of Reach	Jody Wisternoff	Anjunadeep	Deep House
2012	Slowmotion	Jody Wisternoff	Anjunadeep	Deep House
2012	Last Time	David Morales	Ultra	House
2012	Standing In Your Way	StoneBridge, Matt Joko	Zouk	Bigroom
2012	Tears	Gina Star	LOI	-
2013	Imaginary	Brennan Heart	WE R	Hardstyle
2013	Steal You Away	Dash Berlin & Alexander Popov	Aropa	Trance
2013	Tonight	Juanjo Martin	Supermartxe	Progressive House
2013	Hurricane	Dohr & Mangold	Trice	Bigroom
2014	Apart	Orjan Nilsen	Armada	Trance
2014	One In A Million	Andrew Rayel	Armada	Trance
2014	A New Dream	Tenishia	Black Hole	Trance
2014	Starlight	World Sketch	Roth Project	House
2014	Satellite	Tritonal	Enhanced	Bigroom
2014	Earthquake	Venom One	Coldharbour	Trance
2014	Follow The Light	Brennan Heart	WE R	Hardstyle
2015	Echo	Hardwell	Ultra	Trance
2015	This Time	Nic Chagall	Wake Your Minds	Trance
2015	Shooting Star	Juanjo Martin	Clipper's Sound	Progressive House
2015	Thunda	Honey Dijon & Tim K	Classic	-
2015	Ghost In The Machine	Blasterjaxx & MOTi	Spinnin'	Bigroom
2015	All My Life	Cosmic Gate	Armada	Trance
2016	Open My Eyes	Tom Swoon	Revealed	Bigroom
2016	Memories	Juanjo Martin	Blanco y Negro	Pop
2016	Miracle	Fedde Le Grand	WePLAY	-
2016	Lost	Fedde Le Grand	WePLAY	-
2016	Way To Happiness	Mark Sixma	Armada	Trance
2016	World Like This	Alexander Popov	Armada	Trance
2016	Be Here Now	Brennan Heart	WE R	Hardstyle
2017	Home	Andrew Rayel	Armada	Trance
2017	Forgiven	Andrew Rayel	Armada	Trance
2017	Streets Of Gold	Standerwick	Armada	Trance
2017	Sun Comes Again	Tenishia	Interplay	Trance
2017	Black Rose	Blasterjaxx	Maxximize	Bigroom
2017	We Are Legends	Hardwell & Kaaze	Revealed	Bigroom
2017	End Of The World	Kaaze	Revealed	Bigroom
2017	Broken	Brennan Heart & Code Black	WE R	Hardstyle
2017	Return To Love	Shane 54	Armada	Trance
2017	In My Dreams	Futuristic Polar Bears	Knightvision	-
2018	Ocean	Seven Lions & Jason Ross	Ophelia	Pop
2018	This Is Where It Starts	Solarstone	Black Hole	Trance
2018	Coming Back To You	Brennan Heart	WE R	Hardstyle
2019	Close Your Eyes	Jason Ross	Anjunabeats	House
2019	Locked Out Of Heaven	Dash Berlin	Armada	Trance
2019	Nothing Hurts Like Love	Dash Berlin	Bodywrmr	Trance
2019	Young At Heart	Navarra	Pitch	Pop
2019	Never Before	Gareth Emery, Ashley Wallbridge	Garuda	Trance
2019	Poison Lips	Kaaze	Revealed	Bigroom
2020	Moving Mountains	Wolfpack	Smash The House	Bigroom
2020	Foolish Of Me	Seven Lions, Jason Ross, Crystal Skies	Ophelia	Dubstep
2020	Hurts Sometimes	Slander, Fairlane	Heaven Sent	Dubstep
2020	Journey	Brennan Heart	WE R	Hardstyle
2021	By My Side	Wolfpack and Jerry Dávila	Smash The House	Bigroom
2021	Make It Out Alive	Blasterjaxx	Lmg / Outfly	Bigroom
2022	Dancing With Tears In My Eyes	Jeffrey Sutorius	Revealed	Progressive House
2022	Down To Love	Alpha9	Anjunabeats	Trance
2022	Final Frontier	Alpha9	Anjunabeats	Trance
2023	Lightning Strikes	ARTY	Armada	Progressive House
2024	Staring At The Sun	Farius	Enhanced Progressive	Trance
2024	Better Day	Brennan Heart	I AM HARDSTYLE	Hardstyle
2024	Endless In Between	k?d	Monstercat	Trap / Future Bass
2025	The Sea	Sandro Silva	AVANTII Records	Dance / Pop
2026	I Wish You Well	Andrew Bayer	Ophelia	Mainstage
2026	Into The Sun	Last Heroes & Man Cub	Ophelia	Mainstage
2026	Afterlight	Andrew Bayer	Ophelia	Trance
