= Jonathan Mendelsohn =

Jonathan Mendelsohn may refer to:

- Jonathan Mendelsohn (singer) (born 1980), American singer
- Lord Mendelsohn (born 1966), British lobbyist
