= Blasterjaxx =

Dutch electronic music duo

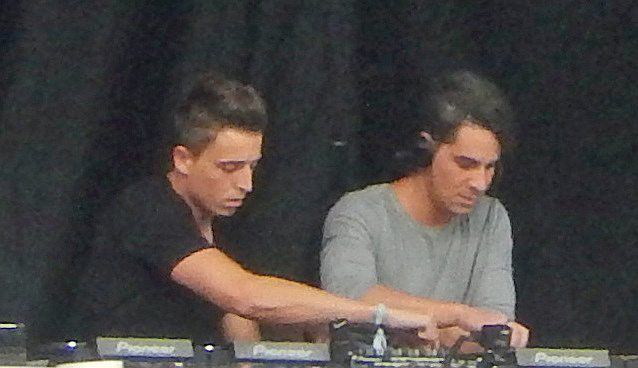
- Blasterjaxx at the 2014 Spring Awakening Music Festival; Thom Jongkind (left), Idir Makhlaf (right)

Background information
- Also known as: THOM
- Origin: The Hague, Netherlands
- Genres: Electro house; big room house; progressive house; hardstyle; future bass; trap; Techno
- Years active: 2010–present
- Labels: Maxximize Records; Spinnin' Records; Revealed; Musical Freedom; Smash the House; Dirty Dutch Music; Mixmash Records; Protocol Recordings; Ones to Watch Records; Dim Mak
- Members: Thom Jongkind; Idir Makhlaf
- Website: blasterjaxx.com

Blasterjaxx is a Dutch DJ and record production duo composed of Thom Jongkind (born 1990) and Idir Makhlaf (born 1991), originated in The Hague and active since 2010. They are mostly known for producing big room house and electro house music, being more active in the first genre.

== History ==
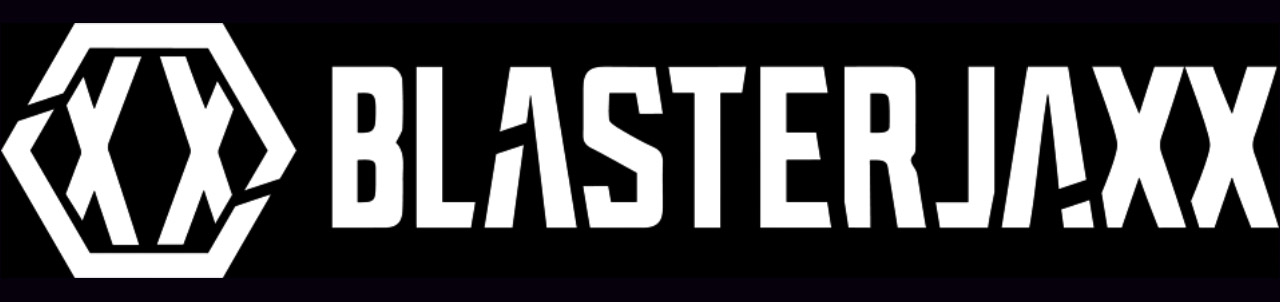
Logo of Blasterjaxx

In 2010, Thom Jongkind, known professionally as Scalix, formed a duo called Blasterjaxx with producer Leon Vielvoije, who left soon after joining. Jongkind then continued under the Blasterjaxx name and started collaborating with Idir Makhlaf, known professionally as Macosta. Makhlaf eventually officially joined Jongkind under the name Blasterjaxx.

In 2012, the Reborn EP was released as a collaboration with D-Rashid, and contained two tracks, "Reborn" and "Where We Go." Dutch EDM producer and DJ, Laidback Luke, signed the tracks to his own label Mixmash Records. In early 2013, the group produced Loud & Proud together with Billy The Kit, with DJ Tiësto subsequently signing the track to his personal record label, Musical Freedom. Blasterjaxx remixed the Tiësto hits "Adagio for Strings" and "Love Comes Again" as well as collaborating with him on a remix of "United," the official anthem of Ultra Music Festival. Blasterjaxx has additional collaboration credits with EDM acts as Dimitri Vegas & Like Mike, David Guetta, Hardwell, Afrojack, Nicky Romero, Quintino, Ibranovski and others.

Blasterjaxx's single "Faith" was a big charting hit in the Netherlands in 2013 and in Sweden in 2014. They subsequently released a collaboration with Hardwell, who edited the track "Fifteen." Blasterjaxx first entered DJ Mag's Top 100 DJs poll at #71 in 2013. 2014 saw the duo reach #13, and #19 in 2015. In June 2015 Blasterjaxx partnered with Electronic Music lifestyle brand Electric Family to produce a collaboration bracelet with 100% of the proceeds being donated to the 20x20x20 Foundation.

In September 2015, Makhlaf announced he was to cease touring, but continue to produce music with Jongkind, citing panic attacks.

In 2024, For the first time Blasterjaxx present their new Techno-alias: THOMM.

== Discography ==
=== Studio albums ===
Title	Album details
Perspective	Released: 19 July 2019; Label: Maxximize, Spinnin'; Format: Digital download

=== Extended plays ===
Title	Year	Record label	Additional information
Get Down / Dealer	2010	Dutch Star Records	
Reborn EP	2012	Mixmash Records	with D-Rashid
Koala EP	2013	Ones To Watch Records	
XX Files	2017	Maxximize Records	
XX Files [Festival Edition]	2017	Maxximize Records	
Blasterjaxx Booster Pack	2017	Maxximize Records	as free download
IV	2020	Maxximize Records	
Welcome To Mystica	2021	Maxximize Records	
Mystical Chapter II	2021	Maxximize Records	

=== Singles ===
Title	Year	Record label	Additional information
"La Vaca"	2010	First Class Music	
"Kingston"	2010	First Class Music	featuring Royal Flavour
"Bambu"	2010	Squeeze Music	with Chaosz
"Afrika"	2010	Dutch Only! Recordings	with Retrick Abigail
"Like Thiz"	2010	Squeeze Music	
"Escucha"	2011	Dirty Dutch Music	with Carlos Barbosa
"Blossom"	2011	First Class Music	
"Dopenez Anthem"	2011	First Class Music	
"Devotion"	2012	First Class Music	
"Toca Flute"	2012	Moganga	with Carlos Barbosa
"Bomberjack"	2012	First Class Music	
"FaYa"	2012	First Class Music	
"Bermuda"	2013	Peak Hour Music	
"Rock Like This"	2013	Smash The House	with Dave Till
"Loud & Proud"	2013	Musical Freedom (Spinnin')	with Billy The Kit
"Puzzle"	2013	DOORN Records (Spinnin')	with Quintino
"Faith"	2013	Powerhouse Music	
"That Big"	2013	Spinnin' Records	with Yves V
"Snake"	2013	Dim Mak	
"Mystica"	2014	Revealed Recordings	
"Titan"	2014	Spinnin' Records	with Badd Dimes
"Mystica (Werewolf)"	2014	Revealed Recordings	
"Astronaut"	2014	DOORN Records (Spinnin')	with Ibranovski
"Echo"	2014	Protocol Recordings	
"Rocket"	2014	Revealed Recordings	with W&W
"Legend Comes To Life"	2014	Mixmash Records	
"Gravity"	2014	Spinnin' Records	
"You Found Me"	2014	Spinnin' Records	featuring Courtney Jenaé
"Beautiful World"	2015	Revealed Recordings	with DBSTF
"No Place Like Home"	2015	Ultra	featuring Rosette
"Forever"	2015	Dim Mak	featuring Courtney Jenaé
"Bowser"	2015	Revealed Recordings	with W&W
"Ghost In The Machine"	2015	Spinnin' Records	with MOTi featuring Jonathan Mendelsohn
"Heartbreak"	2015	Maxximize Records (Spinnin')	
"Parnassia"	2016	Maxximize Records (Spinnin')	with DBSTF
"Soldier"	2016	Maxximize Records (Spinnin')	with Breathe Carolina
"The Silmarillia"	2016	Maxximize Records (Spinnin')	Carlos cover
"Hit Me"	2016	Maxximize Records (Spinnin')	with DBSTF featuring Go Comet!
"Going Crazy"	2016	Revealed Recordings	with Hardwell
"Big Bird"	2016	Maxximize Records (Spinnin')	
"Heart Starts To Beat"	2016	Maxximize Records (Spinnin')	with Marnik
"No Sleep"	2016	Maxximize Records (Spinnin')	
"Collide"	2017	Maxximize Records (Spinnin')	featuring David Spekter
"More"	2017	Maxximize Records (Spinnin')	featuring Mister Blonde
"Black Rose"	2017	Maxximize Records (Spinnin')	featuring Jonathan Mendelsohn
"Savage"	2017	Maxximize Records (Spinnin')	
"All I Ever Wanted"	2017	Maxximize Records (Spinnin')	with Tom Swoon
"Bizarre"	2017	Maxximize Records (Spinnin')	with Uhre
"Narco"	2017	Maxximize Records (Spinnin')	with Timmy Trumpet
"Follow"	2017	Maxximize Records (Spinnin')	
"Phoenix"	2018	Maxximize Records (Spinnin')	with Olly James
"1 Second"	2018	Maxximize Records (Spinnin')	
"Rio"	2018	Maxximize Records (Spinnin')	
"Switch"	2018	Maxximize Records (Spinnin')	with Bassjackers
"Bigroom Never Dies"	2018	Revealed Recordings	with Hardwell
"Super Friends"	2019	Maxximize Records (Spinnin')	featuring Jack Wilby
"Children of Today"	2019	Maxximize Records (Spinnin')	
"Let the Music Take Control"	2019	Rave Culture	with W&W
"Never Be Lonely"	2019	Maxximize Records (Spinnin')	featuring Envy Monroe
"Wonderful Together"	2019	Maxximize Records (Spinnin')	with Dbstf featuring Envy Monroe
"Hide Away"	2019	Maxximize Records (Spinnin')	featuring Envy Monroe
"Music is Our Religion"	2019	Maxximize Records (Spinnin')	
"Blackout"	2019	Maxximize Records (Spinnin')	
"Monster"	2019	Maxximize Records (Spinnin')	featuring Junior Funke
"Life Is Music"	2019	Maxximize Records (Spinnin')	with Olly James
"Mthrfckr"	2020	Maxximize Records (Spinnin')	
"Party All Week"	2020	Maxximize Records (Spinnin')	featuring Jamez
"Alive"	2020	Maxximize Records (Spinnin')	with Asco featuring Norah B.
"Phantasia"	2020	Maxximize Records (Spinnin')	
"Tarzan"	2020	Armada Music	with Armin van Buuren
"One More Smile"	2020	Maxximize Records (Spinnin')	with Shiah Maisel
"Legion"	2020	Maxximize Records (Spinnin')	from Watch Dogs: Legion
"Rescue Me"	2020	Maxximize Records (Spinnin')	featuring Amanda Collins
"Wild Ride"	2020	Maxximize Records (Spinnin')	featuring Henao
"Zurna"	2020	Maxximize Records (Spinnin')	with Zafrir
"Jingle Bell Rock"	2020	Smash The House	with Tony Junior
"Bodytalk (STFU)"	2020	Maxximize Records (Spinnin')	with Raven & Kreyn
"Golden"	2021	Maxximize Records (Spinnin')	with Gabry Ponte featuring Riell
"Rulers Of The Night (10 Years)"	2021	Maxximize Records (Spinnin')	featuring Riell
"Make It Out Alive"	2021	Lmg / Outfly	featuring Jonathan Mendelsohn
"Dreams"	2021	Maxximize Records (Spinnin')	with Mariana Bo
"Our World"	2021	Maxximize Records (Spinnin')	featuring Daniele Sorrentino
"Speaker Slayer"	2021	Maxximize Records (Spinnin')	
"Flying Dutchman"	2021	Maxximize Records (Spinnin')	with Zafrir
"Liberty"	2021	Maxximize Records (Spinnin')	featuring Heleen
"Hard Rave"	2021	Maxximize Records (Spinnin')	
"Breathe Again"	2021	Maxximize Records (Spinnin')	with Blackcode featuring Robbie Rosen
"Bassman"	2021	Maxximize Records (Spinnin')	with Harris & Ford
"Insomniacs"	2021	Maxximize Records (Spinnin')	with Dr. Phunk featuring Maikki
"Saga"	2021	Maxximize Records (Spinnin')	featuring Junior Funk
"Moonlight Sonata Festival I"	2021	Maxximize Records (Spinnin')	Beethoven cover
"Squid Play"	2021	Maxximize Records (Spinnin')	with Cuebrick
"Dynamite (Bigroom Nation)"	2021	Rave Culture	with W&W
"God Mode"	2021	Maxximize Records (Spinnin')	with Riell
"Frozen Fire"	2021	Maxximize Records (Spinnin')	
"The Crown"	2021	Maxximize Records (Spinnin')	featuring Melissa Bonny
"Braveheart"	2021	Maxximize Records (Spinnin')	
"Rabbit Hole"	2021	Maxximize Records (Spinnin')	with Raven & Kreyn
"Shadows"	2021	Maxximize Records (Spinnin')	with Hollywood Undead
"Burn It To The Ground"	2022	Maxximize Records (Spinnin')	featuring Jay Mason
"Hasta La Vista"	2022	Spinnin' Records	with Gabry Ponte
"Chupa"	2022	Maxximize Records	with Sevenn
"Hurricane"	2022	Spinnin' Records	with Prezioso and LIZOT featuring Shibui
"Brutal"	2022	Maxximize Records	with LNY TNZ featuring Jex and Jones Suave
"The Devil's Holding On"	2022	Maxximize Records	featuring Diandra Faye
"Purpose"	2022	Maxximize Records	with Maddix
"Superman"	2022	Armind	with Armin van Buuren featuring 24H
"Stay"	2022	Maxximize Records	with Marnik and LUNAX
"Out the Sky"	2022	Maxximize Records	with BEAUZ
"WASABI"	2022	Dirty Workz	with Da Tweekaz featuring Maikki
"Summer Jams"	2022	Spinnin' Records	with Henri PFR and Jay Mason
"He's a Pirate"	2022	Maxximize Records	
"Holy Water"	2022	Maxximize Records	featuring Maikki
"Boten Anna"	2022	Smash the House	Basshunter cover
"So High"	2022	Maxximize Records	with Le Shuuk featuring Crooked Bangs
"Alice in Wonderland"	2023	Maxximize Records	with Hard Lights and DJ Soda
"Elegibo (Uma Historia de Ifa)"	2023	Spinnin' Records / We Next Music	with Paolo Pellegrino and Mildenhaus
"La Bomba"	2023	Armada Music / Armind	with Armin Van Buuren
"Money On My Mind"	2023	Spinnin' Records	with Sofiloud
"Gabber Style"	2023	Maxximize Records	with NIVIRO
"Nasty"	2023	Smash the House / Dim Mak Records	with 3 Are Legend
"Coconut"	2023	Spinnin' Records	with Prezioso and GRY
"Warriors"	2023	Maxximize Records	with GISHIN and The Way
"New Generation"	2023	Maxximize Records	with Le Prince

=== Remixes ===
Artist	Remix	Label	Year
Merlin Miles	Take A Bow (Blasterjaxx Remix)	Fuckin' House	2011
Tiësto	Adagio For Strings (Blasterjaxx Remix)	Magik Muzik	2013
Tiësto	Love Comes Again (Blasterjaxx Remix)	Magik Muzik	2013
Ayumi Hamasaki	Feel The Love (Blasterjaxx Remix)	Avex Trax	2013
Tom Staar	Kingdom (Blasterjaxx Remix)	Mixmash Records	2013
Quintino and Alvaro	World In Our Hands (Blasterjaxx Remix)	SPRS	2013
Afrojack featuring Spree Wilson	The Spark (Blasterjaxx Remix)	Universal Music	2013
Tiësto	United (Tiësto and Blasterjaxx Remix)	Musical Freedom	2013
Laidback Luke and Dimitri Vegas & Like Mike	More (Blasterjaxx Remix)	Mixmash Records	2013
DVBBS and Borgeous	Tsunami (Blasterjaxx Remix)	SPRS	2013
Vato Gonzalez	Vamos De Rumba (Blasterjaxx Remix)	Dirty House (NL)	2013
David Guetta featuring Sam Martin	Lovers On The Sun (Blasterjaxx Remix)	What A Music Ltd.	2014
Armin van Buuren	Save My Night (Blasterjaxx Remix)	Armind	2014
Jack Eye Jones	Far East (Blasterjaxx Remix)	IBZ Records	2014
Carly Rae Jepsen	I Really Like You (Blasterjaxx Remix)	Interscope Records	2015
Tritonal featuring Chris Ramos and Shanahan	This Is Love (Blasterjaxx Remix)	Enhanced Recordings	2016
Nytrix featuring Dev	Electric Walk (Blasterjaxx Remix)	From Beyond Tomorrow Records	2016
Steve Aoki featuring Sherry St. Germain	Heaven On Earth (Blasterjaxx Remix)	Ultra Records	2016
Krewella	Marching On	Columbia	2016
Dimitri Vegas & Like Mike Vs. Diplo and Kid Ink featuring Deb’s Daughter	Hey Baby (Blasterjaxx Remix)	CNR Music Belgium NV	2017
Wasback and D3fai	Flight 49 (Blasterjaxx Edit)	Warner Music Group	2017
The Chainsmokers featuring XYLØ	Setting Fires (Blasterjaxx Remix)	Columbia Records	2017
Crystal Lake	Roots (Blasterjaxx Edit)	Warner Music Group	2017
Armin van Buuren	Lifting You Higher (ASOT 900 Anthem) (Blasterjaxx Remix)	Armada Music	2019
Armin van Buuren	Million Voices (Blasterjaxx Remix)	Armada Music	2020

== Awards and nominations ==
=== DJ Magazine top 100 DJs ===
Year	Position	Notes	Ref.
2013	71	New Entry	
2014	13	Up 58	
2015	19	Down 6	
2016	43	Down 24	
2017	36	Up 7	
2018	37	Down 1	
2019	36	Up 1	
2020	70	Down 34	
2021	61	Up 9	
2022	52	Up 9	
2023	58	Down 6	
