= Raven & Kreyn =

French electronic music duo

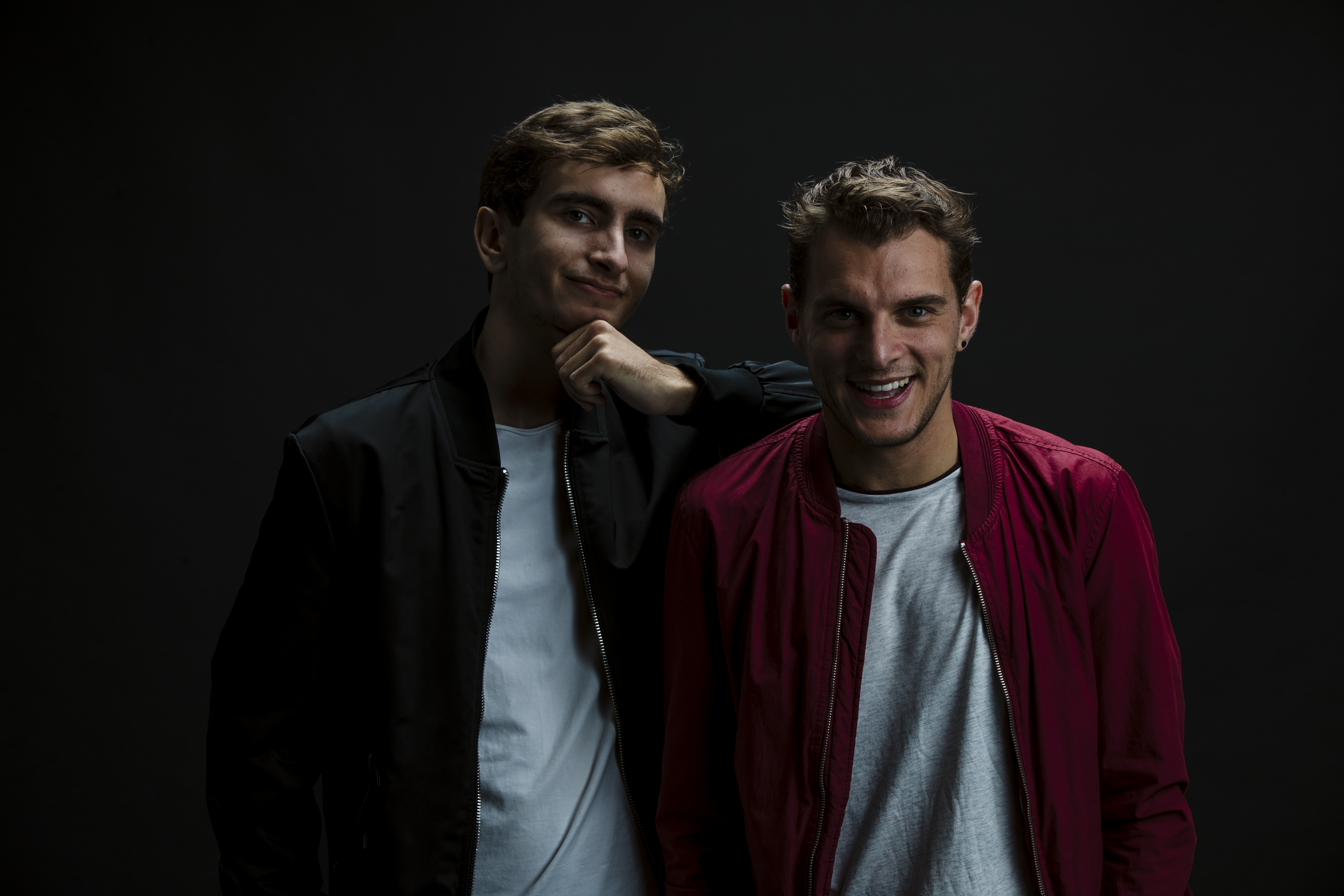
- Raven & Kreyn in 2019

Background information
- Origin: France
- Genres: House; Electro house; Bass house; Future house
- Occupations: Producer; DJ; musician
- Years active: 2013–present
- Labels: Spinnin', Warner Music, Revealed Recordings, Musical Freedom, Armada Music, Ministry of Sound Australia, Hexagon, NoCopyrightSounds
- Members: Alexandre Abescat; Tom Mokrane
- Website: www.ravenkreyn.com

Raven & Kreyn is a French electronic music duo of disc jockeys and producers. Consisting of Alexandre Abescat and Tom Mokrane, Raven & Kreyn started in 2013. The duo signed on notable labels such as Spinnin' Records, Armada Music, Universal Music, Warner Music, Atlantic Records, Big Beat Records, Ministry Of Sound Australia, Hexagon and NoCopyrightSounds.

They are mostly known for their NoCopyrightSounds singles, for example So Happy which reached over 10 million views on YouTube, In The Air which reached over 5 million, Bubble 5 million, Rich 5 million, and others such as Call Me Again, Get This Party, and Sing For You which reached over 10 million on Spotify, 'Bodytalk with Blasterjaxx reached 17 million as well as Bam Bam with Laidback Luke. They now count more than 350 millions streams in total.

However, Raven & Kreyn appeared several times in the international Beatport Top 10 best selling chart, in particular with their single Back To The Future, Bam Bam (with Laidback Luke) as 4th, Nobody Else (with RetroVision) 2nd, Rock Now at the 29th place, Long Game 30th place, Chicago 32nd. and even more recently.

These young disc jockeys were played and supported numerous times by David Guetta, Avicii, Tiësto, Martin Garrix, Alan Walker, Dimitri Vegas & Like Mike, Afrojack, Laidback Luke, Bingo Players, and many other artists from the electronic dance music scene.

They debuted radio broadcasting in 2018, with DJ sets on the national French radio Fun Radio.

In 2019, they went for the first time at Tomorrowland, together with Don Diablo.

In 2020, they were ranked as 19th Best producers in the world according to 1001tracklists Top 101, becoming one of the highest entry of all time.

They previously ranked as 110th in 2019.

== Musical career ==
Raven & Kreyn first caught the public's attention with their 2015 bounce anthem "Rave It". After the track charted as 19th in the Beatport Top 100 it didn't take long until the EDM industry discovered their sound. Taking a step in the Bass House scene, they released "Long Game" and "Rock Now" the following year, two tracks that pushed the duo's imprint forward, and gathered a surprising amount of support from the electronic dance music scene.

In 2016, Raven & Kreyn released their first track on Don Diablo's Hexagon label, a collaboration with Steff Da Campo called "Chicago". The duo's aggressive sound that made the success of Rock Now quickly resonated in DJ sets all around the world, continuing to build the hype around the French act.

Although, 2017 has seen the duo grow very quickly with multiple releases on Hexagon, Armada Music, and NoCopyrightSounds. Tracks such as So Happy, In The Air, Call Me Again had made the duo popular on YouTube, Spotify, and SoundCloud. The release of Nobody Else, a collaboration with French producer RetroVision took place the same year. It was heard all around the globe, and gathered an enormous number of supports from music industry leaders. Featuring vocal samples from Loleatta Holloway's Love Sensation, the track is a crossover between old-school breakdowns and future house. It became Raven & Kreyn most industry-supported track up to this day, and one of the most DJ-played tracks of 2017.

The duo ended 2017 with an official remix of Galantis & Throttle song Tell Me You Love Me.

In 2018, Raven & Kreyn teamed-up with Maxim Schunk to revisit Destiny's Child's 90s classic Say My Name, featuring vocals by BISHØP.

The French DJs released Bubble, Biscuit and Muffin on NoCopyrightSounds a few months later, three songs that confirmed their new futuristic approach of House music. Apart from the YouTube and SoundCloud community, the duo had imposed itself with numerous Spinnin Records releases.

Raven & Kreyn also released an official remix for Joe Jonas band DNCE and Italian DJs Merk & Kremont the same year.

== Ranking top 101 best producers in the world ==
- 2019: #110º
- 2020: #19º

== Discography ==
=== Singles ===
Artist(s)	Title	Label	Genre	Date
Raven & Kreyn, KDH, Scarlett	Dum Dum	NoCopyrightSounds	Future house	03/02/2023
Raven & Kreyn, Flakkë, Reverse Prime	That Melody (feat. Like Lions)	Loudkult	House	01/04/2022
Raven & Kreyn feat. Mingue	Be Better	Revealed Recordings	Future house	28/01/2022
Blasterjaxx and Raven & Kreyn	Bodytalk (STFU) [D-Stroyer Hard Mix]	Maxximise	Hardstyle	10/12/2021
Blasterjaxx and Raven & Kreyn	Rabbit Hole	Maxximise	Big room house	03/12/2021
Raven & Kreyn, Aryue, Parah Dice	DO IT TO IT (feat. Dsnt Matter)	One Seven Music	House	29/11/2021
Raven & Kreyn	Diamonds	Maxximize Records	Future rave	29/10/2021
Raven & Kreyn, Chester Young	Telephone	Dharma Records	House	24/09/2021
Raven & Kreyn, Chester Young	Feel The Beat	Revealed Recordings	Future house	09/09/2021
Raven & Kreyn, Deekey, M7STIC	Time To Shine	Revealed Recordings	Future house	22/07/2021
Raven & Kreyn x Breathe Carolina	Vibes	Spinnin' Records	Bass house	02/07/2021
Raven & Kreyn x BounceMakers	Ready	Maxximize Records	Bass house	18/06/2021
Raven & Kreyn x jeonghyeon	You & I (VIP MIX) [ft. David Taylor]	HEXAGON	Future house	14/05/2021
Raven & Kreyn	Lift Your Voices	Future House Music	Future house	16/04/2021
Raven & Kreyn x jeonghyeon	Out Of Me	Musical Freedom	Future house	19/02/2021
Raven & Kreyn x jeonghyeon	You & I (ft. David Taylor)	HEXAGON	Dance pop	28/01/2021
Raven & Kreyn	Trouble (VIP Mix)	Future House Music	Future house	08/01/2021
Raven & Kreyn	Trouble	Future House Music	Dance pop	01/01/2021
Blasterjaxx and Raven & Kreyn	Bodytalk (STFU)	Maxximise	Big room house	18/12/2020
Raven & Kreyn	House Of Love	Future House Music	Future house	28/08/2020
Raven & Kreyn and RudeLies	Drank	Time Machine/Hexagon	House	11/07/2020
Smack and Raven & Kreyn	In My Opinion	Spinnin' Records	House	16/06/2020
Raven & Kreyn x Damon Sharpe	Let's Get Real	Armada Music	House	12/06/2020
Raven & Kreyn x Mo Falk	Ain't Right	Hexagon	House	21/05/2020
Raven & Kreyn	No Playin	Hysteria Records	House	28/04/2020
Raven & Kreyn	Express Yourself	Maxximize Records	Bass house	28/03/2020
Raven & Kreyn x Charmes	Step Back	Protocol Records	House	13/03/2020
Raven & Kreyn	Lose Control	Mixmash Records	House	11/02/2020
Robert Falcon and Raven & Kreyn	Sunny	Spinnin' Records	House	04/01/2020
Raven & Kreyn	1995	Future House Music	Future house	20/12/2019
Laidback Luke x Raven & Kreyn	Bam Bam	Mixmash Records	House	11/10/2019
Raven & Kreyn	Tear It	Fonk Recordings	Bass house	16/09/2019
Raven & Kreyn	The Future	Hexagon	Future house	29/08/2019
Raven & Kreyn	Step Aside	Maxximize Records	House	12/08/2019
Raven & Kreyn	BullDog	Hysteria Records	Bass house	28/06/2019
Raven & Kreyn	There For You	Future House Music	House	15/06/2019
Raven & Kreyn	RICH	NoCopyrightSounds	Bass house	01/06/2019
Raven & Kreyn x Breathe Carolina	Stronger	Spinnin' Records	Bass house	15/03/2019
Raven & Kreyn x Dante Klein	Escape	Spinnin' Records	Future house	25/02/2019
Raven & Kreyn	Bad Boy	Hexagon	House	11/02/2019
Raven & Kreyn	Muffin	NoCopyrightSounds	House	10/11/2018
Raven & Kreyn	Sing For You	Future House Music	Future house	21/09/2018
Raven & Kreyn x Holl & Rush	Faith	Spinnin' Records	House	31/08/2018
Raven & Kreyn featuring Bishop	Touch	Spinnin' Records	Future house	04/08/2018
Raven & Kreyn	Biscuit	NoCopyrightSounds	House	07/07/2018
Raven & Kreyn x Uplink	Memories	Spinnin' Records	Trap	20/04/2018
Raven & Kreyn	Bubble	NoCopyrightSounds	House	07/04/2018
Raven & Kreyn X Moji X Illusion	Dream Forever	NoCopyrightSounds	Trap	14/03/2018
Raven & Kreyn	Honey	Mixmash Records	Future house	16/02/2018
Maxim Schunk x Raven & Kreyn feat. BISHOP	My Name	Enhanced Recordings	Future house	02/02/2018
Raven & Kreyn, Retrovision	Nobody Else	Spinnin' Records / Hexagon	Future house	10/11/2017
Raven & Kreyn	Call Me Again	NoCopyrightSounds	House	04/10/2017
Raven & Kreyn	So Happy	NoCopyrightSounds	House	29/07/2017
Raven & Kreyn	Get This Party	NoCopyrightSounds	Future house	15/06/2017
Raven & Kreyn	In The Air	NoCopyrightSounds	House	06/04/2017
Raven & Kreyn, Matroda	Back To The Future	Spinnin' Records / Hexagon	House	03/03/2017
Raven & Kreyn	Delight	Ministry Of Sound / Astrx	Future house	17/02/2017
Raven & Kreyn	With You	Armada Music / Showland	Electro house	30/01/2017
Raven & Kreyn, FractaLL	Killed It	MixFeed / Feature	House	08/11/2016
Raven & Kreyn, Steff Da Campo	Chicago	Spinnin' Records / Hexagon	Electro house	15/07/2016
Raven & Kreyn	Rock Now	Guru Recordings	Electro house	25/04/2016
Raven & Kreyn	Long Game	Guru Recordings	Electro house	04/01/2016
Raven & Kreyn	Just Bounce	Repost Network	Electro house	15/07/2015
Raven & Kreyn	Rave It	Ministry Of Sound / Hussle	Electro house	13/04/2015

=== Remixes ===
Artist(s)	Song title	Label	Date
Galantis & Dotan	Never Felt A Love Like This (Raven & Kreyn Remix)	Atlantic / Big Beat	26/03/2020
Aloe Blacc & Mathieu Koss	Never Growing Up (Raven & Kreyn Remix)	Scorpio Music	16/08/2019
Laidback Luke & Keanu Silva	Oh Yes (Raven & Kreyn Remix)	Mixmash Records	24/05/2019
Breathe Carolina & Robert Falcon	My Love (Raven & Kreyn Remix)	Spinnin' Records	11/01/2019
Merk & Kremont feat. DNCE	Hands Up (Raven & Kreyn Remix)	Universal Music	03/08/2018
Galantis & Throttle	Tell Me You Love Me (Raven & Kreyn Remix)	Atlantic / Big Beat	15/12/2017
