= We Got That Cool =

Single by Yves V featuring Afrojack and Icona Pop
- Released: 14 June 2019
- Recorded: 2019
- Length: 3:33
- Label: Spinnin'; Warner Bros.
- Songwriter(s): Hanna Jäger; Yves Van Geertsom; Nick van de Wall; Caroline Hjelt; Aino Jawo; Neal Conway; Crystal Waters; Nathaniel Hardy
- Producer(s): Yves V; Afrojack; The Basement Boys

Yves V singles chronology
"My Friend" (2019)	"We Got That Cool" (2019)	"Not So Bad" (2020)

Afrojack singles chronology
"Cut It Up" (2019)	"We Got That Cool" (2019)	"Sad" (2019)

Icona Pop singles chronology
"Sink Deeper" (2019)	"We Got That Cool" (2019)	"Freak on Me" (2019)

"We Got That Cool" is a song written by Hanna Jäger and co-recorded and produced by Belgian DJ Yves V featuring Dutch DJ/producer Afrojack and Swedish synth-pop duo Icona Pop. The song interpolates Crystal Waters's 1991 hit "Gypsy Woman (She's Homeless)". In the United States, the single reached number four on Billboard's Dance/Mix Show Airplay chart in November 2019. It was also featured in the FIFA 21 video game soundtrack.

== Track listings ==
Digital download and stream

1. "We Got That Cool" – 3:33

Remixes

1. "We Got That Cool" (Anton Powers Extended)
2. "We Got That Cool" (Anton Powers Radio Edit)
3. "We Got That Cool" (Carta Extended)
4. "We Got That Cool" (Carta Radio Edit)
5. "We Got That Cool" (Carta DJ Edit)
6. "We Got That Cool" (Robert Falcon, Jordan Jay Extended Remix)
7. "We Got That Cool" (Robert Falcon, Jordan Jay Remix)
8. "We Got That Cool" (Robert Falcon, Jordan Jay Dj Edit)
9. "We Got That Cool" (Robert Falcon, Jordan Jay Instrumental Remix)
10. "We Got That Cool" (Chico Rose Extended)
11. "We Got That Cool" (Chico Rose DJ Edit)
12. "We Got That Cool" (Chico Rose Radio Edit)
13. "We Got That Cool" (Chico Rose Instrumental)
14. "We Got That Cool" (Disto Extended)
15. "We Got That Cool" (Disto Radio Edit)
16. "We Got That Cool" (Buzz Low Extended)
17. "We Got That Cool" (Buzz Low DJ Edit)
18. "We Got That Cool" (Buzz Low Radio Edit)

== Charts ==
Chart (2019)	Peak position
Belgium (Ultratip Bubbling Under Flanders)	12
Belgium (Ultratop 50 Wallonia)	40
France (SNEP)	183
Hungary (Dance Top 40)	33
Poland (Polish Airplay Top 100)	22
UK Singles (OCC)	68
UK Dance (OCC)	9
US Dance/Mix Show Airplay (Billboard)	4

== Certifications ==
Region	Certification	Certified units/sales
United Kingdom (BPI)	Silver	200,000^{‡}
^{‡} Sales+streaming figures based on certification alone.
