= Mark Sixma =

Dutch DJ

- Also known as: M6
- Born: Mark Frederik Sixma; 23 February 1983 (age 43); Breda, Netherlands
- Genres: Trance; progressive house
- Occupations: Remixer; music producer; DJ; composer; musician
- Instruments: Synthesizer; drum machine; Steinberg Cubase
- Years active: 2006–present
- Labels: Armada; A State of Trance; Revealed Recordings
- Website: www.marksixma.com

Mark Frederik Sixma (Dutch pronunciation: [ˈmɑr(ə)k ˈsɪksmaː]; born 23 February 1983) is a Dutch trance and house music producer and DJ. In his career, Sixma has worked on collaborations with Armin van Buuren, Faruk Sabanci and W&W, among others. He is best known for his hit singles "Sinfonia", "X", "Chased" (with Andrew Rayel), and "Panta Rhei" (with Armin van Buuren).

== Career ==
Mark Sixma made his first notable trance music production with Def Tactical whilst also releasing a Project 6 E.P at Five AM Records. This was followed up by a release called Destination 6 and received 'Tune of the Week’ status on Armin van Buuren’s radio show, A State Of Trance. His next single led him signing up to record label Armada Music, 'Fade 2 Black' made him once again earn a 'Tune of the Week' status on A State Of Trance.

Armin van Buuren has selected Sixma's tracks for his annual A State Of Trance compilation for three years. Armin also featured one of Sixma's tracks on his Wii Game and also gave him the opportunity to remix Minack, the collaboration between Armin Van Buuren and Ferry Corsten.

In 2013 Sixma released a single called 'Requiem' on W&W's 'Mainstage Music' label which it made it to the top in the Beatport trance chart and was the most played trance track in 2013. He also remixed the iconic song called 'Adagio for Strings' in which was supported by many artists like Armin van Buuren, Markus Schulz, Cosmic Gate and Andrew Rayel.

He toured around the globe with A State of Trance Festival alongside Ferry Corsten, Armin Van Buuren and other DJs, and also performed at Ultra Music Festival. He has not entered the DJ Mag top 100 DJs poll.

== Discography ==
=== Singles ===
==== 2007 ====
- "Destination 6" (Mark Sixma presents M6)
- "Invictus" (with Def Tactical)

==== 2008 ====
- "Fade 2 Black"
- "Visionary"
- "Amazon Dawn / There And Back Again" (Mark Sixma presents M6)

==== 2009 ====
- "Piranha" (with Re:Locate)
- "Into The Unknown / Byte Me" (Mark Sixma presents M6)
- "Interplay" (Mark Sixma presents M6, with B.E.N.)
- "Origin" (Mark Sixma presents M6, with Willem van Hanegem)
- "Paradise Lost / Opus Sectrum" (Mark Sixma presents M6)
- "Terminal 69" (with Willem Van Hanegem)
- "Deep Inside" (Mark Sixma presents M6)
- "Silverback / Ultimatum" (Mark Sixma presents M6)

==== 2010 ====
- "Hidden Light" (Mark Sixma presents M6, with Klauss Goulart)
- "The Flow" (Mark Sixma presents M6)
- "Walking Away" (Featuring Dee-On)
- "Forsaken"
- "The Rising / Obscura" (Mark Sixma presents M6)
- "Genesis / Inferno" (Mark Sixma presents M6, with Willem van Hanegem)
- "Want To Fly" (with Klauss Goulart, featuring Outono Em Marte)
- "Days Of Wonder" (Mark Sixma presents M6)

==== 2011 ====
- "Unspoken / Forgotten Shores" (Mark Sixma presents M6)
- "Twist" (with W&W)
- "Fair & Square" (Mark Sixma presents M6)
- "Arrivals"

==== 2012 ====
- "Cupid's Casualty" (Featuring Amba Shepherd)
- "Starbust" (with Faruk Sabanci)
- "Perlas" (with Fisherman & Hawkins)

==== 2013 ====
- "Requiem"
- "Rio" (with Klauss Goulart)
- "Tripod" (with Faruk Sabanci)
- "Character"
- "Refused" (with Jerome Isma-Ae)

==== 2014 ====
- "The Saga" (with Chris Schweizer)
- "Shadow" (W&W edit)
- "Adagio For Strings"
- "Rise Up" (with Kill The Buzz)

==== 2015 ====
- "Vendetta"
- "Panta Rhei" (with Armin Van Buuren)
- "Stellar"
- "Connected" (Mark Sixma presents M6, with Audyon)
- "Restless Hearts" (featuring Emma Hewitt)
- "Chased" (with Andrew Rayel)

==== 2016 ====
- "Cupid's Casualty" (with Futuristic Polar Bears featuring Amba Shepherd)
- "Way to Happiness" (featuring Jonathan Mendelsohn)
- "Fuego" (Mark Sixma presents M6)
- "Omega"
- "Rebirth" (Mark Sixma presents M6 and Standerwick)

==== 2017 ====
- "Invincible" (featuring Betsie Larkin)
- "Heartbeat" (Mark Sixma presents M6)
- "Destiny"
- "Missing" (featuring Emma Hewitt)

==== 2018 ====
- "Prime" (with Husman)
- "Sinfonia"
- "Sphere"
- "The Clock"

==== 2019 ====
- "The Bass" (with Ben Nicky)
- "X"
- "Anasthasia" (with T99)

==== 2020 ====
- "Paint the Sky" (featuring Eline Esmee)
- "Our Song" (with Morgan Page)
- "Never Forgotten" (as M6)
- "Bad Dreams" (as M6)
- "Somebody Else Instead" (with Jordan Shaw)

==== 2021 ====
- "Elemental" (as M6 with Avao)
- "Pantheon" (with Ørjan Nilsen)

=== Remixes ===
2016

- Cosmic Gate - Exploration of Space (Mark Sixma Remix)

2018

- Andrew Rayel and David Gravell — "Trance Reborn (FYH100 Anthem)" (Mark Sixma Remix)
- Binary Finary - "1998" (Mark Sixma Remix)
