= Jean Marie (DJ) =

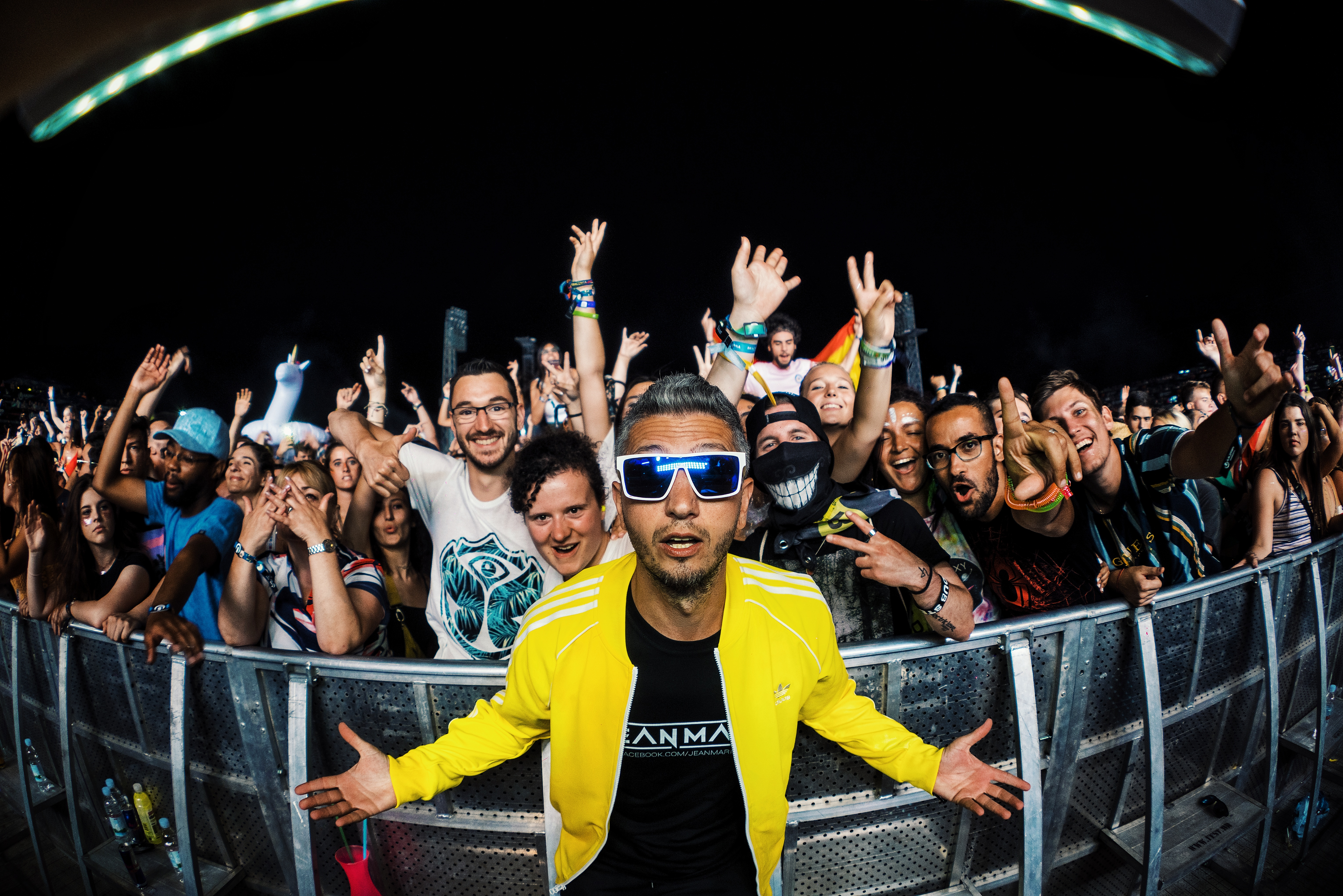
- Jean Marie at Ultra Music Festival

Background information
- Born: Jean Marie Carrabba; 20 November 1982 (age 43); Italy
- Genres: Electronic Dance Music, Pop, Jazz
- Occupations: DJ, Songwriter, Music Producer
- Instruments: DJ, Digital audio workstation
- Years active: 2008 - present
- Labels: Spinnin' Records, Smash The House, Sony Music
- Website: www.jeanmarie.pro

Jean Marie Carrabba (born 20 November 1982), known as Jean Marie is an Italian DJ, producer, songwriter and remixer.

== Career ==
JEAN MARIE was producing & DJing under the name Hotfunkboys before. In 2016 he released the single 'Basketball' under the name Jean Marie, with vocals by the American rapper Flo Rida and the Spanish pop singer Marta Sánchez. In 2017, he presented his song 'Moonlight Fiesta' at the Ultra Music Festival Miami Main stage featuring Sean Paul. He has DJed at festivals Spring Break in Croatia and the Sun Valley Festival in Switzerland. He entered the Top 10 Main Chart of Beatport and iTunes several times and has released digital and radio interviews, including DJ Mag, In 2018, He released 'Gaia' featuring Vini Vici and Blastoyz on Spinnin' Records and crossed over more than 1 Million Streams, later in 2019, Vini Vici, Jean Marie and Hilight Tribe together released a new single 'Moyoni' via Smash The House.

In 2020, He projected 'Future Kids' with multiple DJs and producers, also featuring Snoop Dogg on the project.

In 2021, He released 'Kiss Me Now' featuring Flo Rida and Future Kids

== Discography ==
Title	Featured artist(s)	Year	Record label
Kiss Me Now	Flo Rida, Future Kids	2021	Hi Klass Music (Sony Music Entertainment)
Future Kids	Snopp Dogg	2020	Sony Music Italy
Freed From Desire	Robert Blues, Audio Sonik	2020	Smash The House
Moyoni	Vini Vici, Hilight Tribe	2019	Smash The House
Dolci Pensieri	Flaremode, Matt Joe	2019	Smash The House
Gaia	Vini Vici, Blastoyz	2018	Spinnin' Records
Moonlight Fiesta	Sean Paul	2017	Spinnin' Records
Basketball	Marta Sanchez, Flo Rida	2017	Sony Music Entertainment (on behalf of Dance Tunes Records)
Afterhourz	Mister V	2015	Blanco y Negro Music
House of Mirrors		2012	
