= Brian Cross =

Spanish DJ and musicproducer

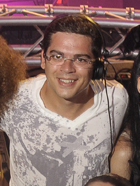
- Brian Cross at Amnesia Ibiza, 2012

Background information
- Born: Brian Fortuny Cruz; 9 December 1979 (age 46); Barcelona, Catalonia, Spain
- Genres: House, Pop
- Occupations: Music producer, DJ, remixer
- Labels: Ultra Records, Sony Music, Armada Music
- Website: djbriancross.com

Brian Cross is a Spanish record producer, DJ and entrepreneur from Barcelona, Catalonia, Spain.

He is known for working with numerous other artists from different music styles including Armin van Buuren, Ricky Martin, Sophie Ellis-Bextor, Yandel, Robbie Rivera, Inna, Leah Labelle and many more. He has released on some of the world's biggest record labels including Armada Music, Ultra Music, Dirty Dutch, Big Beat Records, In Charge, Sony Music and A State of Trance. In 2015 he signed with Ultra Music.

Brian Cross is also the creator of POPSTAR festival in Amnesia Ibiza featuring artists like Hardwell, Avicii, Cedric Gervais and global pop icons including Pitbull, Nelly Furtado, Inna, Sophie Ellis-Bextor and many more.

In 2014, Brian Cross signed for the summer season with Ushuaïa Ibiza and Hard Rock Hotel Ibiza sharing the stage with Snoop Dogg, Robin Thicke, Jason Derulo, Pitbull, Kylie Minogue, The Prodigy, Nile Rodgers, Ellie Goulding, Placebo and Icona Pop.

In 2015, Brian Cross signed with SuperMartXé as their weekly resident at the world's biggest club Privilege Ibiza and for the worldtour of the brand. The weekly performances included guests like Afrojack, Chuckie, Deniz Koyu, Matthew Koma, Two Tone and the 12-hour non-stop closing party featuring Nervo, Thomas Gold, Glowinthedark and Yves V. 2015 was also the year where Brian Cross performed for the first time at Tomorrowland Festival in Belgium and Tomorrowworld Festival in Atlanta. Both performances took place at the V Session Stages with artists like Chuckie, Borgore, Firebeatz, Ftampa, Quintino, R3hab and of course the host of the stage Yves V.

In May 2016, Brian became the new Head of the Electronic department of Livenation, Spain. He has also signed for another season as headliner for SuperMartXé in Privilege Ibiza sharing the stage with Steve Angello, Chris Brown, Afrojack, Chuckie, NERVO, Yves V and many more. In April 2016 Brian Cross had his debut at Tomorrowland Brasil in Itu, São Paulo, and is also confirmed to perform for the second time at Tomorrowland in Boom, Belgium on the V sessions stage.

In 2017, Brian Cross performed for the third time on Tomorrowland in Boom, Belgium and returned to Amnesia Ibiza as weekly guest on the new event Black Out which hosted guests like Dimitri Vegas & Like Mike, Hardwell, Nicky Romero and many more.

== Discography ==
Studio albums

- Darkness To Light (2016)
- Popstar - The Album (2013)

Singles

- Futuristic Polar Bears and Brian Cross - Ravers Unite // Generation Smash (2021)
- Chuckie, Brian Cross, and Luis Roca featuring New Black Light Machine - Make Me Feel // Dirty Dutch (2017)
- Brian Cross featuring Carlinhos Brown - Magalenha // sono Music (Armada) (2017)
- Brian Cross featuring JV - Gonna Be Yours // Universal Music (2017)
- Brian Cross featuring Lali - Firestarter // Sony Music (2016)
- Brian Cross featuring Miguel Bosé - Hielo // Sony Music (2016)
- Brian Cross featuring Yandel - Baile y Pasion // Sony Music (2016)
- Brian Cross and 2Maniaks - Fat Beat // Dirty Dutch (2016)
- Brian Cross featuring Vein, IAMCHINO and Two Tone - Faces and Lighters // Sony Music (2016)
- Brian Cross featuring Angelika Vee - "Unbreakable" (Heren Remix) // Ultra Music (2015)
- Brian Cross featuring Angelika Vee - "Unbreakable" // Ultra Music (2015)
- Edurne featuring Brian Cross - "Amanecer" // Sony Music (2015)
- Ricky Martin featuring Brian Cross - "Disparo al Corazón" (Remix)// Sony Music (2015)
- Marco V and Brian Cross - "Squeezed" // Ultra Music (2015)
- Brian Cross and 2Maniaks - "Take Me" // Ultra Music (2015)
- Brian Cross featuring Daniel Gidlund - "Soldier" // Sony Music (2013)
- Brian Cross featuring Leah LaBelle - "Shotgun" // Sony Music (2013)
- Brian Cross featuring Inna - "Boom Boom" // Sony Music (2013)
- Brian Cross featuring Sophie Ellis-Bextor - "Save Myself" // Sony Music (2013)
- Brian Cross featuring Daniel Gidlund - "Together" Sony Music (2012)
- Brian Cross featuring Recardo Patrick - "Why Don't you" // Sony Music (2011)
- Brian Cross featuring Monica Naranjo - "Dream Alive" - Sony Music
- Brian Cross featuring Keneida - Waiting // "In Charge - Be Yourself" (2009)
- Brian Cross - "4U" // Armada Music (2008)

Remixes

- TINI - Great Escape (Brian Cross remix) // Universal Music (2016)
- Nervo featuring Child of Lov - People Grinnin' (Brian Cross remix) // Big Beat Records (2016)
- Alx Veliz - "Danzing Kizomba" (Brian Cross Remix - Spanish version) // Universal Music (2016)
- Alx Veliz - "Danzing Kizomba" (Brian Cross Remix - English version) // Universal Music (2016)
- Ricky Martin - "La Mordidita" (Brian Cross remix) // Sony Music (2015)
- Ricky Martin - "Vida" (Brian Cross remix) // Sony Music (2014)
- Innocence - "Jeopardy" (Brian Cross remix) // Sony Music
- David Bisbal - "Esclavo De Sus Besos" (Brian Cross Remix) // Universal Music
- Marco V - "Solitary Confinement" (Brian Cross remix) // In Charge - Be Yourself (2009)
- Robbie Rivera - "Back To Zero" (Brian Cross remix) // In Charge - Be Yourself (2008)
- Marco V - "Dudak" (Brian Cross remix) // In Charge - Be Yourself (2008)
- Robbie Rivera - "Float Away" (Brian Cross remix) // Ultra Music (2007)
- Elastika - "Rush" (Brian Cross remix) // Armada Music (2007)
- Armin Van Buuren - "Burned with desire" (Brian Cross remix) // Armada Music (2004)

== Mixes ==
- KU Music Radio Show #65 w/ Brian Cross
- Glowinthedark - Lightstate #31 w/ Brian Cross
- Amnesia Ibiza DJ Sessions Vol 1 - mixed by Marco V and Brian Cross
- Amnesia Ibiza DJ Sessions Vol 2 - mixed by Marco V and Brian Cross
- Amnesia Ibiza DJ Sessions Vol 3 - mixed by Tocadisco and Brian Cross
- Amnesia Ibiza DJ Sessions Vol 4 - mixed by Benny Benassi and Brian Cross
- Amnesia Ibiza DJ Sessions Vol 5 - mixed by Seb Fontaine and Brian Cross
- Amnesia Ibiza DJ Sessions Vol 6 - mixed by Brian Cross and Michael Woods
- Amnesia Ibiza DJ Sessions Vol 7 - mixed by Brian Cross and Hardwell

== Radio Shows ==
Brian Cross Radio show

Every weekend Brian Cross hosts his weekly radio show in the Spanish national radio station Europa FM. In 2016/2017 his weekly guest artists are David Guetta Armin Van Buuren, Hardwell, Yves V, Chuckie, W&W and Nervo. In 2014/2015 his weekly guests were Steve Aoki and Yves V. Other guests included Nervo, Chuckie, Vinai, Dannic, Borgore, Firebeatz, Quintino, Dyro and AN21.

Brian Cross presents Ultra Radio

From 2014 till 2016 Brian Cross was the official host of the weekly Ultra Radio Show in Spanish. Every week he hosted different guest on the show including Steve Aoki, Kygo, Nervo, Paul Van Dyk, Mako, Dank and many more. The show is broadcast on various radio stations all over the world, on SoundCloud and Mixcloud
