= Diego Miranda =

Paraguayan footballer (born 1986)

Personal information
- Full name: Diego Armando Miranda
- Date of birth: 20 January 1986 (age 40)
- Place of birth: Paraguay
- Height: 1.82 m (6 ft 0 in)
- Position: Striker

Team information
- Current team: Gimnasia (J)
- Number: 17

Senior career*
| Years | Team | Apps | (Gls) |
| 2004–2007 | Club 12 de Octubre | 50 | (4) |
| 2008– | Gimnasia (J) | 15 | (1) |
- * Club domestic league appearances and goals as of 29 March 2009

Diego Miranda (born 20 January 1986) is a Paraguayan football striker. He currently plays for Gimnasia y Esgrima de Jujuy in Argentina.
