= Anouk Matton =

Belgian disc jockey

Mattn
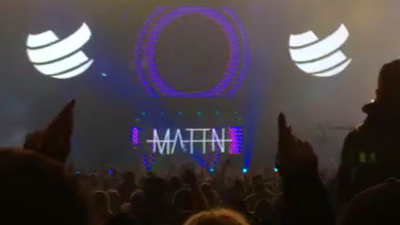

Background information
- Born: Anouk Matton; 1992 (age 33–34)
- Origin: Antwerp
- Genres: house music, EDM
- Occupation: Disc Jockey

Instagram information
- Page: Anouk MATTN
- Followers: 483,000 (21 September 2024)

Anouk Matton (born 1992), also known as Mattn, is a Belgian DJ and record house producer. She has regularly featured in the top 100 DJs poll and is known as one of the most prominent women in the EDM music scene.

== Career ==
Mattn was born in 1992 and comes from Antwerp, Belgium. Her music has been styled as "electro-house", and she also combines singing with her DJing. She has played live sets worldwide, including at notable events such as Creamfields and Tomorrowland.

Mattn has produced a number of hit tracks, typically on the Smash the House record label, including "Café Del Mar 2016" with Futuristic Polar Bears that peaked at #22 in the Belgian charts in 2016. In 2020 Mattn collaborated with D-Wayne to release the track "Morning Mood".

In 2021 Mattn had a reality tv series, Anouk Matton Privé, on the VTM TV channel. The series attracted negative criticism in the media. Following a cessation, in 2022 Mattn returned to live touring which included performing a series of shows at the Ushuaïa Ibiza Beach Hotel supporting Dimitri Vegas & Like Mike.

=== Awards and recognition ===
In 2019 Mattn won the MTV Europe Music Award for Best Belgian Act. She has been listed five times, from 2018 to 2022, in the DJ Mag Top 100 poll of worldwide disc jockeys as voted by the public. Her highest position, #42, was in 2020. DJ Mag also stated in 2020 that Mattn was a "trailblazer" as one of the few women prominent in the EDM genre.

== Personal life ==
Mattn married Dimitri Vegas, half of the DJ act Dimitri Vegas & Like Mike, in Ibiza in 2017. Mattn had a son in 2021.

== Discography ==
Mattn singles
Title	Artist	Year	Peak Belgium	Peak France
Café Del Mar 2016	Mattn & Futuristic Polar Bears	2016	22	87
Let The Song Play	Mattn & Magic Wand feat. Neisha Neshae	2017	37	—
