= Korolova (DJ) =

Ukrainian DJ and music producer

- Born: Olga Korolova; March 17, 1988 (age 38); Chernihiv, Ukrainian SSR, Soviet Union
- Genre: Melodic techno
- Years active: 2012–present

Olga Korolova (born 17 March 1988), also known as Korolova, is a Ukrainian DJ and music producer. She primarily produces melodic techno.

Korolova has played the main stage at the music festival Tomorrowland, performed at EDC Las Vegas, Untold, NEON Countdown, So Track Boa, Parookaville, and collaborated with record labels Tomorrowland Music, Insomniac, and Anjunabeats.

Korolova released tracks on Ultra Records, Armada, AFTR:HRS, and Get Physical Music, before starting her own label, Captive Soul, in 2023.

In 2023, Korolova delivered over 100 performances across 50 countries.

== Early life ==
Korolova was born and raised in Chernihiv, Ukraine. She always had an affinity for music, but fell in love with electronic music specifically in 2004 when she attended a live set of Gabriel & Dresden. At that point she started increasingly listening to trance DJs and soon realized that she wanted to get into the world of DJing herself.

For most of her early career, Korolova played EDM under the name DJ Da Queen, but it wasn't until her set at Daydream Festival in 2017 that she realized she was ready for a change.

== Career ==
Korolova publishes much content on social media, including concerts, entire DJ sets, and singles. In August 2026, she had almost 300 million views and 900,000 subscribers on YouTube, over 1.6 million followers on TikTok, over 2.2 million followers on Instagram, and about 1.3 million monthly listeners on Spotify.

Throughout her career, Korolova has collaborated with a variety of producers (Jan Blomqvist, Spada, Meduza, Tube & Berger, etc.) to create singles that have become staples in her concerts. Some of her best known collaboration tracks are “Be Strong” with Spada (2022), “Lost in Space” with Franky Wah (2022), “Ready for More” with Two Are and Alar (2021), her remix of “This Feeling” by Vintage Culture & Goodboys (2022), “Sweet Disposition” with Gundamea and Andy Ruddy (2022), and “Nightshapes” with MotherEarth and Tyoz (2024).

In October 2023, Korolova started her own label, also called Captive Soul, where she began releasing her own music and collaborations with other artists. It doubles as an events brand, which she uses to put on shows at well-known venues where she headlines alongside other electronic music peers.

In 2024 Korolova was featured as "Artist of the Month" in the July issue of the Mixmag Ukraine magazine. She has twice appeared in the DJ Mag worldwide Top 100 DJs poll, being listed at number 60 in 2024 and number 50 in 2025.

== Personal life ==
Korolova left her home in Chernihiv, Ukraine due to the Russian invasion of Ukraine. She initially fled to Poland, then moved to Lisbon, Portugal in 2022, before returning to Poland in 2024. She has since returned to Portugal and currently resides in Lisbon with her family.
