= Alex Hosking =

Australian singer-songwriter

- Born: 1992/93 (age 33–34); Adelaide, Australia
- Genres: pop; dance; house
- Occupation: Singer
- Years active: 2012–present
- Label: Sony

Alex Hosking (born 1992/93) is a singer-songwriter from Adelaide, Australia. She came to prominence following her feature on the PS1 single "Fake Friends", which peaked at number 19 on the Official Singles Chart.

== Early life ==
Hosking was raised in Adelaide, Australia. She began writing songs at the age of seven.

== Career ==
Hosking began her singing career via a YouTube channel. This led to her recording her first album, Wish, in Nashville in 2012; the album has since been removed from download and streaming services. In the same year, she auditioned for The X Factor, reaching the Top 25 in the 'Under-25 Girls' category, and wrote the debut single, "Bodies", for Vera Blue.

Hosking began writing music professionally in 2017, some of her early work including "Saying Something" alongside Lucas & Steve and "Skin Deep" alongside Tom Ferry. Her debut single, "Monsters", was released in 2019.

In 2020, "Fake Friends", a song Hosking had written in 2017 with producer Mark Alston, and songwriters Anne Tello and Barry MacClean was released as a collaboration with PS1, a DJ from New York City, with a music video premiering in June 2020. The song entered the UK Official Singles Chart in the same month, eventually peaking at number 19 in September 2020. By September 2020, the song was certified Silver by the British Phonographic Industry, and was eventually certified Gold in June 2021.

In 2021, Hosking released a second song alongside PS1, entitled "Life Goes On". The song peaked at number 41 in the Official Singles Chart.

== Personal life ==
Hosking is based in London. She is dyslexic.

== Discography ==
=== Singles ===
==== As lead artist ====
Title	Year	Peak chart positions	Album
Title	Year	NZ Hot	Album
"Monsters"	2019	—	Non-album singles
"It's Over" (with De Hofnar)	2020	—	Non-album singles
"Round & Round" (with Bart B More)	2020	—	Non-album singles
"Not Lovin' It" (with Silque)	2020	—	Non-album singles
"Rooftop in Amsterdam" (with Zwette)	2020	—	Non-album singles
"Playing Up"	2021	—	Non-album singles
"Need Your Love" (with Majestic)	2021	—	Non-album singles
"Workout" (with DJ Craig Gorman)	2022	—	Non-album singles
"Jungle" (with 1991)	2024	25	Non-album singles

==== As featured artist ====
Title	Year	Peak chart positions		Certifications	Album
Title	Year	UK	UK Dance	Certifications	Album
"Skin Deep" (Tom Ferry featuring Alex Hosking)	2018	—	—		Non-album singles
"Sweet" (Max Styler featuring Alex Hosking)	2019	—	—		Non-album singles
"Fake Friends" (PS1 featuring Alex Hosking)	2020	19	7	BPI: Gold	Non-album singles
"Somebody" (Quix featuring Alex Hosking)	2020	—	—		Non-album singles
"Know You Best" (Famba and Jake Tarry featuring Alex Hosking)	2020	—	—		Non-album singles
"Life Goes On" (PS1 featuring Alex Hosking)	2021	41	14	BPI: Silver	Non-album singles
"Bad" (Young Bombs featuring Discrete and Alex Hosking)	2023	—	—		Non-album singles
"—" denotes a recording that did not chart or was not released.
