= Smash the House =

Belgian record label founded in 2010

Smash The House
- Parent company: CNR Music
- Founded: 2010
- Founder: Dimitri Vegas & Like Mike
- Distributors: Orchard; Spinnin' (2011–13); Armada (2014–2017)
- Genre: Electro house, Big room house, EDM, electronic music
- Country of origin: Belgium
- Location: Willebroek, Belgium
- Official website: smashthehouse.com

Smash the House is a record label founded in 2010 by Belgian electronic music DJ and record producer duo Dimitri Vegas & Like Mike. It is the home to many artists suchas Bassjackers, Wolfpack and Ummet Ozcan.

Smash The House was distributed by Spinnin' Records from 2011 to 2013. Since 2013 until 2017, the label was distributed by Armada Music.

== Sublabels ==
- Generation Smash
- Smash Deep
- Smash Classics
- Green Room run by Like Mike
- House Of House run by Dimitri Vegas
- Alteza run by Vini Vici
- BSMNTTRAXX

== Artists ==
- Atika Patum
- Bassjackers
- Basto
- Blasterjaxx
- Chuckie
- Dimitri Vegas & Like Mike
- Felguk
- Futuristic Polar Bears
- Hardwell
- Jean Marie
- Kshmr
- Mattn
- Nervo
- Nicky Romero
- Quintino
- Regi
- Sandro Silva
- Sidney Samson
- Steve Aoki
- Sylver
- Thomas Newson
- Timmy Trumpet
- Tony Junior
- Twoloud
- Ummet Ozcan
- Vini Vici
- W&W
- Wolfpack
- Yves V
