= Futuristic Polar Bears =

British DJs

- Origin: London, England
- Genres: House, progressive house, electro house
- Years active: 2010–present
- Labels: Spinnin', Revealed, Smash the House, ZeroThree, Harem
- Members: Fran Cosgrave
- Website: futuristicpolarbearsofficial.com

Francis Cosgrave, better known by his stage name Futuristic Polar Bears, is a British DJ and producer from London.

He has been signed to labels Spinnin', Revealed Smash The House and Protocol recordings.

== Career ==
The Futuristic Polar Bear has had many hit singles, including various number 1 singles in the Beatport Global dance charts, with releases on Revealed Recordings and his own record label CMMD Records

Originally, FPB was a trio, but Luke Hayes left in August 2018.

== Discography ==
=== Singles ===
==== Charted singles ====
Year	Title	Peak chart positions												Album
Year	Title	AUS	AUT	BEL (Vl)	BEL (Wa)	FIN	FRA	GER	IRL	NLD	SWE	SWI	UK	Album
2014	"Back To Earth"	—	—	16^{[A]}	19^{[A]}	—	—	—	—	—	—	—	—	Non-album singles
2016	"Café Del Mar 2016" (Dimitri Vegas & Like Mike vs. Klaas Edit) (with MATTN)	—	—	22	41^{[B]}	—	87	—	—	—	—	—	—	Non-album singles
"—" denotes a recording that did not chart or was not released in that territory.

==== Other singles ====
- 2013: Drift (with East & Young) [Strictly Rhythm]
- 2013: Never Give Up [Pacha Recordings]
- 2013: All Night Long [Klass Action]
- 2014: Back To Earth [Revealed Recordings]
- 2014: Tomorrow Is Now (with Mark Le Sal) [Mutants]
- 2014: Game Over [Harem Records]
- 2014: Vargo (with Danny Howard) [Spinnin' Records]
- 2014: Romani (with Danny Howard) [Spinnin' Records]
- 2014: Taurus (with Thomas Newson) [Revealed Recordings]
- 2015: The Ride [Starter Records]
- 2015: Manila (with Sultan + Shepard) [Harem Records]
- 2015: Velocity (with Henry Fong) [Revealed Recordings]
- 2015: Night Vision [Armada Trice]
- 2015: Shake It Off (with Kill The Buzz) [Revealed Recordings]
- 2015: BYOS (with Sandro Silva) [Armada Music]
- 2015: Why (with D.O.D) [Wall Recordings]
- 2016: Cupid's Casualty (with Mark Sixma and Amba Sheperd) [Armada Music]
- 2016: Lynx (with Maddix) [Revealed Recordings]
- 2016: Sea Coffee (With Mattn and Dimitri Vegas & Like Mike) [Blanco y Negro]
- 2016: Kali (with Qulinez) [Armada Music]
- 2017: Grizzly (with Dimitri Vangelis & Wyman) [Buce Records]
- 2017: Cactus (with Wolfpack featuring X-Tof) [Smash The House]
- 2017: Destiny (with Wolfpack featuring Shurakano) [Smash The House]
- 2018: Are Am Eye (with KEVU) [Smash The House]
- 2018: Can't Get Over You (featuring Syon) [Moon Records]
- 2018: Running Wild (with Yves V featuring PollyAnna) [Spinnin' Records]
- 2018: Derb (with Wolfpack) [Smash The House]
- 2018: Moksha (with Wolfpack) [Cmmd Records]
- 2018: Throne (with Mattn and Olly James) [Smash The House]
- 2018: Aventus [Maxximize]
- 2018: I Can't Do It (with Kess Ross) [Protocol Recordings]
- 2018: Acid Drop (with Dimitri Vangelis & Wyman) [Buce Records]
- 2019 Favourite DJ (with Kess Ross) [Sirup Music]
- 2019: Scars (with Vanto and DJ Junior) [Cmmd Records]
- 2019: Cntrl (with DJ Junior, Mylok and Love Letters) (OVA Megane No Megami OST)
- 2019: You & Me [Protocol Recordings]
- 2019: Madness (with MR. BLACK) [Revealed Music]
- 2019: Odyssey (with ANGEMI) [Maxximize]
- 2019: Shiva (with DJ Yaksa, Bustarow and Love Letters) [23rd Precinct]
- 2018: Gypsy (with Mariana BO and MR. BLACK) [Dharma]
- 2020: After Party (with Lenerd featuring Love Letters) [Cmmd Records]
- 2020: Better Than This (featuring Franky) [Protocol Recordings]
- 2020: Take Control [Protocol Recordings]
- 2020: Nebula (with REGGIO and Love Letters) [Cmmd Records]
- 2020: Faith (featuring Lux) [Protocol Recordings]
- 2020: With Your Love (with Jaxx & Vega) [Revealed Music]
- 2020: Horns Of Fire (featuring Jesus Davila) [Cmmd Records]
- 2020: Rave Anthem (with REGGIO) [Revealed]
- 2020: Run Away (with Bassjackers and Jaxx & Vega) [Smash The House]
- 2020: Lord of the Rave (with Wolfpack and Nick Havsen) [Generation Smash]
- 2021: Aura (with Corey James featuring MØØNE) [Protocol Recordings]
- 2021: United We Stand (with Justin Prime) [Cmmd Records]
- 2021: Addiction (with Cuebrick and Angie Vu Ha featuring Iives) [Maxximize]
- 2021: Mind Reader (with Sammy Boyle) [Cmmd Records]
- 2021: Ravers Unite (with Brian Cross) [Generation Smash]
- 2021: No Tears Allowed (featuring Franky) [Protocol Recordings]
- 2021: Take Me Away (with Jewelz & Sparks featuring Carly Lyn) [Maxximize]
- 2021: Breathless (with Tony Junior and Skazi) [Revealed]
- 2021: Kiss The Night (with Justin Prime and K1lo) [Nexchapter]
- 2021: Witchcraft (with Mastercraft UK featuring Jaimes) [Purple Fly Records]
- 2022: The One (with Havoq featuring Diandra Faye) [Revealed]

=== Remixes ===
- 2014: Divine Inspiration - "The Way (Put Your Hand In My Hand)" (Futuristic Polar Bears Remix) [Heat Recordings]
- 2014: Idyll - "Paradisal" (Futuristic Polar Bears Remix) [Anticodon]
- 2015: Marletron - "World Is Yours" (Futuristic Polar Bears Remix) [Monster Tunes]
- 2016: Kreesha Turner, Sultan & Ned Shepard - "Bring Me Back" (Futuristic Polar Bears Remix) [Armada Music]
- 2017: Jurgen Vries - "The Theme" (Futuristic Polar Bears Remix) [Armada Music]
- 2017: MATTN and Magic Wand featuring Neisha Neshae - "Let The Song Play" (Futuristic Polar Bears Remix) [Smash The House]
- 2017: Morgan Page and Damon Sharpe featuring Stella Rio - "Beautiful Disaster" (Futuristic Polar Bears Remix) [Armada Music]
- 2018: Dimitri Vegas & Like Mike and Steve Aoki vs. Ummet Ozcan - "Melody" (Futuristic Polar Bears Remix) [Free Download]
- 2018: Dimitri Vegas & Like Mike featuring Wolfpack - "Ocarina" (Futuristic Polar Bears Remix) [Free Download]
- 2018: Dimitri Vegas, Moguai & Like Mike - "Mammoth" (Futuristic Polar Bears Remix) [Free Download]
- 2018: Regi - "Ellie" (Futuristic Polar Bears Remix) [CNR Music Belgium]
- 2020: Qulinez - "El Toro" (Futuristic Polar Bears Remix) [TurnItUp Muzik]
- 2020: Jerry Davila ft. Richie Loop - Celebrate (Futuristic Polar Bears, Jerry Davila & DJ Pelos Remix)
- 2020: Krewella featuring Asim Azhar - "Paradise" (Futuristic Polar Bears Remix) [Mixed Kids Records]
- 2021: MR. BLACK ft. Richie Loop - "Feel The Fire" (Futuristic Polar Bears and Jerry Davila Remix) [Skink]
- 2021: Yves V - Echo (Futuristic Polar Bears Remix) [Controversia]
