= Le Shuuk =

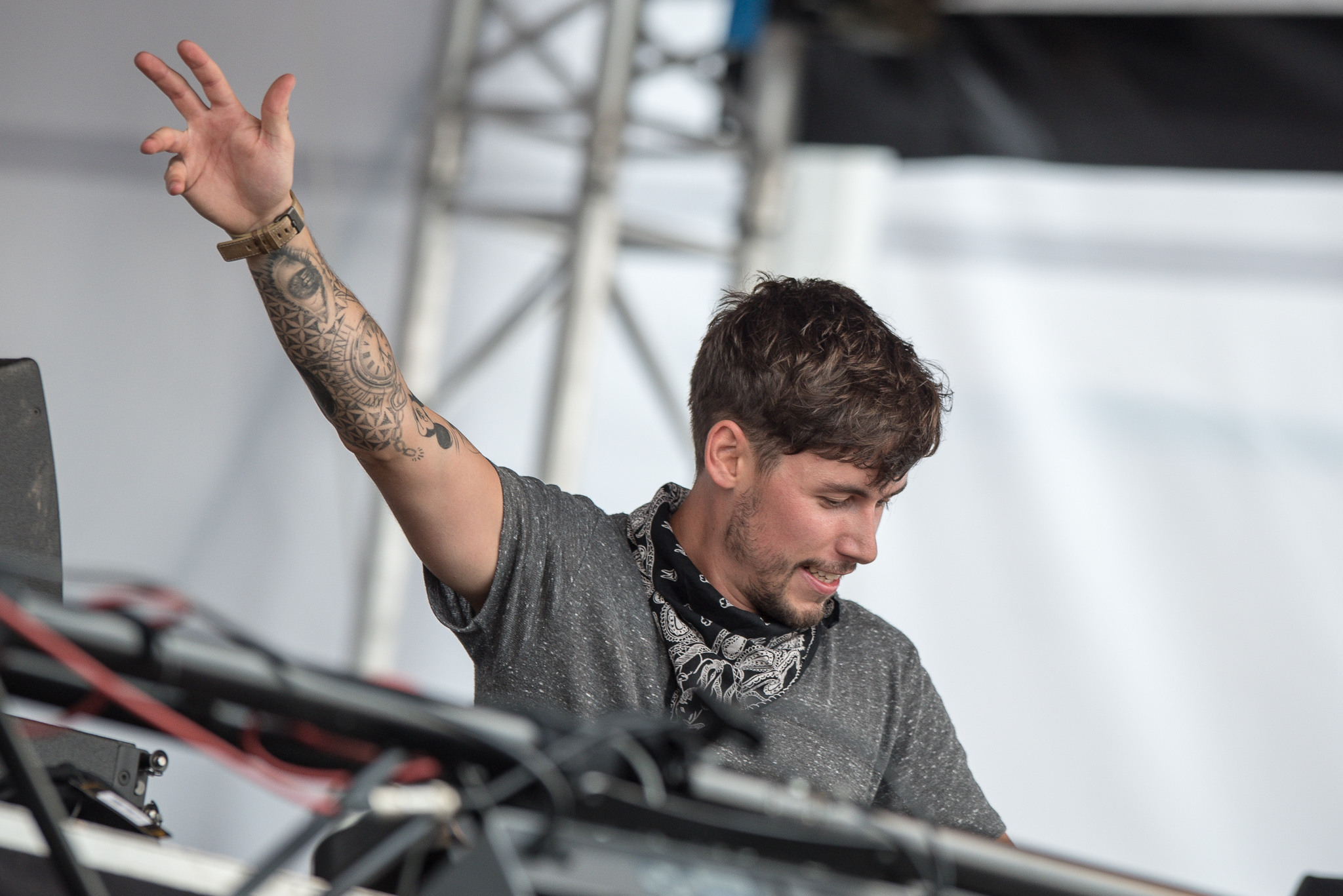
- Le Shuuk at Open Beatz 2016
- Born: Chris Stritzel; 28 November 1987; Stuttgart, Germany
- Occupation: DJ

Chris Stritzel (born 28 November 1987), also known as Le Shuuk, is a German DJ.

== Biography ==
In 2005, Le Shuuk started out as a Resident DJ and signed his first recording contract.

In 2015, he produced the hymn of the World Club Dome where he played mainstage.

Le Shuuk regularly releases a Podcast called Loud & Proud. BITE

== Discography ==
=== Singles ===
- Kick the Big Ben
- Le Shuuk & E-mine – Hey Mister! (2011)
- Le Shuuk & Croaky – Hey Mister! (2014)
- Le Shuuk & Croaky – Wonderland (2014)
- Le Shuuk & Mark Bale – Far Out
- Le Shuuk – Scream!
- Le Shuuk – Seth
- Le Shuuk & Joebe Feat. Ahromat – What The Fuuk
- Le Shuuk feat. Chase Holfelder – Next to You (2015)
- Tai & Le Shuuk – Unicorn (2015)
- Le Shuuk & Cuebrick – Reality (2016)
- Le Shuuk – Evil (2016)
- Le Shuuk & ItaloBrothers – Hurry (2023)

=== Remixes ===
- Noize Generation (feat. Patrik Jean) – A Song For You (Le Shuuk Remix)
- Mynoorey – Million Lights (Le Shuuk Radio Mix)
- Mynoorey – Million Lights (Le Shuuk Club Mix)
- Niels van Gogh & Dave Ramone – Kick It (Le Shuuk Remix)
- Niels van Gogh ft. Princess Superstar – Miami (Le Shuuk Remix)
- Brooklyn Bounce – Loud & Proud (Le Shuuk Mix)
- Chico Chiquita – Ready, Aim, Fire! (Le Shuuk Radio Mix)
- Timbo – Rule The Night (Le Shuuk Remix)
- Dario Rodriguez – MFKIN (Le Shuuk Remix)
- Marco Petralia & Rubin feat. Ilan Green – Coming Home (Le Shuuk Remix)
- Alle Farben, ILIRA – Fading (Le Shuuk Remix)
