= Yves V =

Belgian DJ and music producer

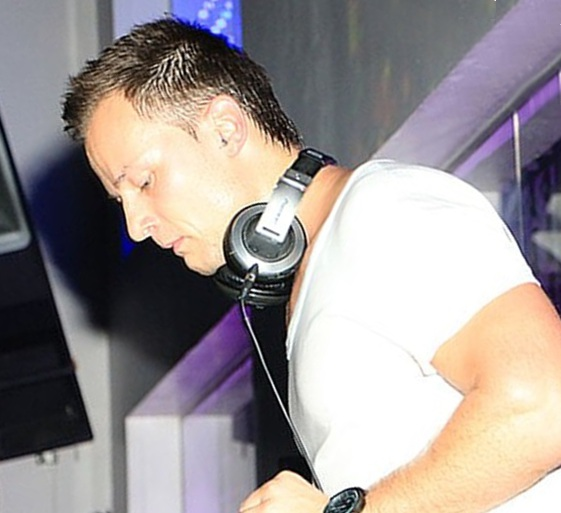
- Yves V in 2014

Background information
- Also known as: Yves V
- Born: Yves Van Geertsom
- Origin: Antwerp, Belgium
- Genres: Electro house; progressive house; Dutch house
- Occupations: DJ, music producer
- Labels: Spinnin' Records, Smash the House, Controversia
- Website: yves-v.com

Yves Van Geertsom, known by stage name Yves V (/ˈiːv viː/) or Eefee, is a Belgian DJ and music producer.

== Career ==
Yves V has performed at festivals such as TomorrowWorld, Sensation, Mystic Valley, and Mysteryland. Yves V has also been guest DJ in clubs such as Guaba, Pacha, Anzu Club, Nikki Beach, and others.

Yves V's first hit was his remix "Insane Pressure" in 2009. He collaborated with artists in "Madagascar" with Dimitri Vegas & Like Mike & Angger Dimas, "Cloudbreaker" with Basto!, "Momentum" with Regi, "Old Skool Sound" with Chuckie and "Direct Dizko" with Sander van Doorn.

Together with the Belgian-Greek DJ-duo Dimitri Vegas & Like Mike, Yves-V is a resident DJ at the Belgian festival Tomorrowland, where he has performed 8 times at its mainstage. Yves V is also official resident DJ at TomorrowWorld in Atlanta (United States) and Itu (Brasil). He also collaborated in the making of the official Tomorrowland CD. Since 2012, Yves V hosts his V-Sessions stage at Tomorrowland.

In summer 2014, "Wait Till Tomorrow" with Regi featuring Mitch Crown became a hit. Yves V released his newest single "Octagon" on record label Smash The House in Autumn 2015.

On June 14, 2019, Yves V, Afrojack, and Icona Pop released the collaborative single "We Got That Cool". In the United States, the single reached number four on Billboard's Dance/Mix Show Airplay chart in November 2019.

In 2015, Yves V took the 34th position in the DJ Mag Top 100. He was the second Belgian to be in the top forty, after Dimitri Vegas and Like Mike, though he has not been ranked higher since.

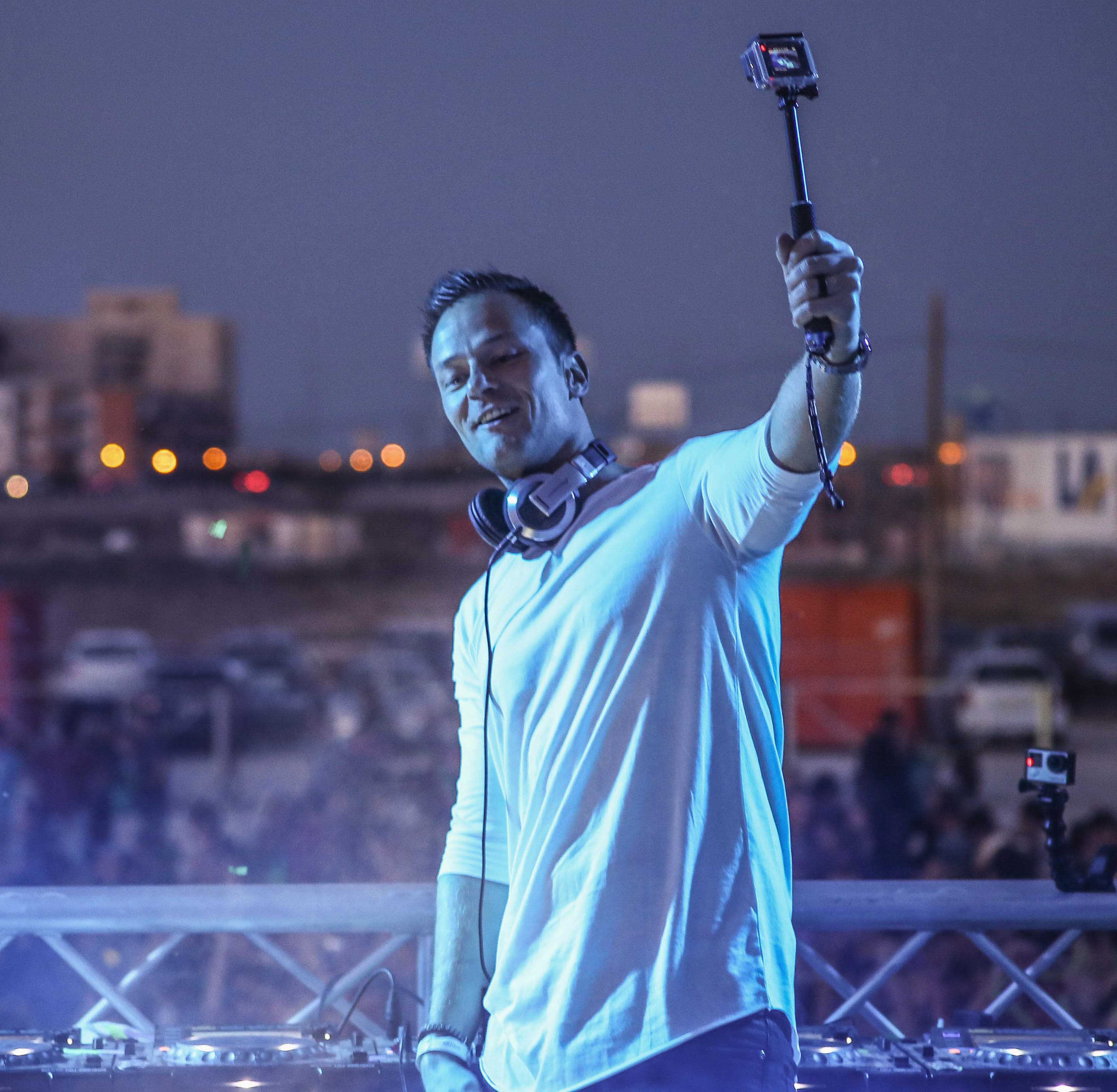
Yves V in Alicante (Spain) in 2016.

== Discography ==
=== Extended plays ===
List of extended plays
Title	Details
Money Money / Show Me	Released: 9 December 2019; Label: Spinnin' Records; Formats: Digital download, CD

=== Singles ===
Title	Year	Peak chart positions	Certifications	Label
Title	Year	UK	Certifications	Label
"Licence to Play" (with Guy'do)	2008	—		Red Rabbit Records
"The Skillz" (featuring MC Shurakano)	2009	—		Belgian House Mafia
"Insane Pressure"	2009	—		Belgian House Mafia
"Madagascar" (with Dimitri Vegas & Like Mike and Angger Dimas)	2011	—		Smash the House
"Eclipse"	2011	—		Armada Zouk
"Shaykid" (with Lazy Jay)	2011	—		Big & Dirty Records
"CloudBreaker" (with Basto!)	2011	—		Smash the House
"Mandala"	2012	—		Smash the House
"Enter My World"	2012	—		Smash the House
"Arkadia"	2012	—		Smash the House
"Bronx" (with Bassjackers)	2012	—		Smash the House
"Loops & Tings" (with Dimitri Vegas & Like Mike)	2012	—		DOORN Records (Spinnin' Records)
"Wow" (with Felguk)	2012	—		Smash the House
"Chained" (vs. Dani L Mebius)	2012	—		Spinnin' Records
"Amok" (with Loopers and Jacob van Hage)	2012	—		Smash The House
"Sonica (Running on a Highway)" (featuring Paul Aiden)	2013	—		Oxygen Recordings (Spinnin' Records)
"Umami"	2013	—		DOORN Records
"That Big" (with Blasterjaxx)	2013	—		Spinnin' Records
"Direct Dizko" (with Sander van Doorn)	2013	—		DOORN Records (Spinnin' Records)
"What" (with Romeo Blanco)	2013	—		Sneakerz Muzik
"Chrono" (with Mell Tierra)	2013	—		6K Music
"Manga"	2014	—		DOORN Records
"Crash" (with Rudebo1)	2014	—		Smash the House
"Oldschool Sound" (featuring Chuckie)	2014	—		Smash the House
"Wait Till Tomorrow" (with Regi featuring Mitch Crown)	2014	—		Smash the House
"Karma" (with Freddy See)	2014	—		6K Music
"Chasing Fairytales"	2014	—		
"Crackle" (with D-Wayne)	2014	—		Wall Recordings
"Memories Will Fade" (with Promise Land featuring Mitch Thompson)	2015	—		Smash the House
"Magic" (with Sidney Samson)	2015	—		Smash the House
"The Right Time" (featuring Mike James)	2015	—		Smash the House
"Octagon"	2015	—		Smash the House
"King Cobra" (with Don Diablo)	2015	—		Smash the House
"Indigo" (with Skytech and Fafaq)	2015	—		DOORN Records (Spinnin' Records)
"Unbroken" (with Quintino)	2015	—		Spinnin' Records
"Out of Gravity" (with Swanky Tunes)	2016	—		Showland Records
"Fever" (vs. Skytech and Fafaq)	2016	—		DOORN Records (Spinnin' Records)
"Daylight" (with Dimitri Vangelis & Wyman)	2016	—		Spinnin' Records
"To the Beat" (with Laidback Luke featuring Hawkboy)	2016	—		Mixmash Records
"On Top of the World" (with Sem Thomasson featuring Ruby Prophet)	2016	—		Spinnin' Records
"Joker"	2016	—		Spinnin' Premium (Spinnin' Records)
"Condor"	2016	—		Armada Zouk (Armada Music)
"Find Your Soul"	2017	—		Spinnin' Records
"Blow" (with Marc Benjamin)	2017	—		Spinnin' Records
"Riders on the Storm" (with Robert Falcon featuring Troy Denari)	2017	—		SPRS (Spinnin' Records)
"Stay" (with Matthew Hill featuring Betsy Blue)	2017	—		Spinnin' Copyright Free Music (Spinnin' Records)
"Sorry Not Sorry" (with Carta)	2017	—		Spinnin' Records
"Here with You" (vs. Florian Picasso)	2018	—		Dharma Worldwide (Spinnin' Records)
"Beautiful Tonight" (with Sevenn)	2018	—		SOURCE (Spinnin' Records)
"Magnolia" (with Hiddn)	2018	—		Spinnin' Records
"Running Wild" (with Futuristic Polar Bears featuring PollyAnna)	2018	—		Spinnin' Records
"Something Like" (with Zaeden featuring Jermaine Fleur)	2018	—		Source (Spinnin' Records)
"Durga" (with Mariana Bo)	2018	—		Dharma Worldwide (Spinnin' Records)
"Innocent" (with Alok featuring Gavin James)	2018	—		Spinnin' Records
"Teenage Crime" (with Matthew Hill and Adrian Lux)	2019	—		Spinnin' Records
"No Regrets" (with Kshmr featuring Krewella)	2019	—		Dharma Worldwide (Spinnin' Records)
"One Day" (with Sam Feldt featuring Rozes)	2019	—		Spinnin' Records
"My Friend"	2019	—		Spinnin' Records
"We Got That Cool" (featuring Afrojack and Icona Pop)	2019	68	BPI: Silver	Spinnin' Records
"Not So Bad" (with Ilkay Sencan featuring Emie)	2020	—		Spinnin' Records
"Halfway" (with Bhaskar featuring Twan Ray)	2020	—		Spinnin' Records
"Home Now" (featuring Alida)	2020	—		Spinnin' Records
"High Like This" (with Fr!es)	2020	—		Spinnin' Records
"Round & Round"	2020	—		Universal Music
"Echo"	2021	—		Controversia
"Alone Again" (with Sesa featuring PollyAnna)	2021	—		Spinnin' Records
"Complicated" (with Steve Aoki featuring Ryan Caraveo)	2021	—		Dim Mak
"Reflect" (with Bjorn Verbex)	2021	—		Spinnin' Records
"Finally" (with Hugel)	2021	—		Spinnin' Records
"Forget You" (with Robert Falcon and Jimmy Clash)	2021	—		Spinnin' Records
"Are You OK?" (with Dubdogz featuring Ilira)	2021	—		Spinnin' Records
"Faith" (with Hiddn and Almero)	2021	—		Spinnin' Records
"Air Balloon" (with Alphacast)	2021	—		Spinnin' Records
"Just Wanna Be Loved" (with Cat Dealers featuring Coldabank)	2022	—		Controversia
"Imagine Me & You" (featuring Fast Boy)	2022	—		Controversia
"Sound Of A Beating Heart" (with Sem Thomasson)	2023	—		Controversia
"—" denotes a recording that did not chart or was not released.

=== Remixes ===
Title	Year	Original artist
"Emoji"	2019	Galantis
"A Lover and a Memory"	2019	Steve Aoki featuring Mike Posner
"Shine"	2019	Brother Leo
"Alane"	2020	Robin Schulz and Wes
"Feliz Navidad"	2020	F4ST
"Life Goes On"	2021	PS1 featuring Alex Hosking
"The Feels"	2021	Twice
"Bop Bop!"	2022	Viviz
"Walk Higher"	2023	Will Brown
"In The City"	2023	Basstripper
"Meet You There"	2023	Alex Hosking, Martin Jensen and Jimmy James
