= Era Istrefi discography =

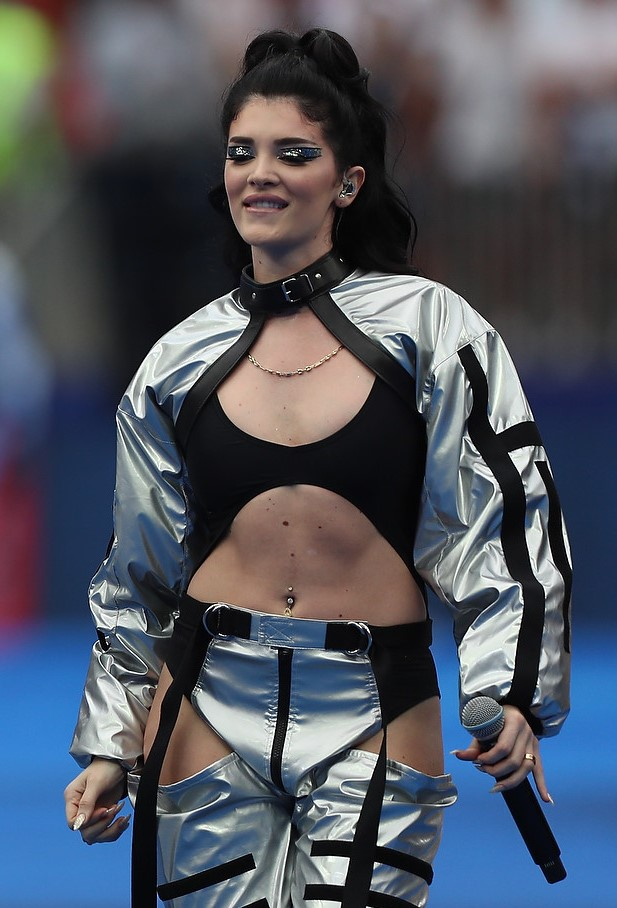
- Era Istrefi performing live at the 2018 FIFA World Cup Final
- Singles: 30
- As featured artist: 4

Kosovo-Albanian singer and songwriter Era Istrefi has released 30 singles as a lead artist and four as a featured artist. Since the Albanian singles chart's inauguration in 2015, four of Istrefi's singles have reached the top 10 in Albania, with "BonBon" and Redrum topping the ranking in 2016 and 2017. She started her career after releasing her debut single, "Mani për money", in 2013. Her breakthrough single, "BonBon", followed in 2016, reaching the top 50 in multiple countries, including Australia, Denmark, France, Germany, Romania and Switzerland. It further received certifications, among others gold in Canada, Italy and the Netherlands as well as platinum in France.

== Singles ==
=== As lead artist ===
==== 2010s ====
List of singles in the 2010s decade, with selected chart positions and certifications
Title	Year	Peak chart positions													Certifications	Album
Title	Year	ALB	AUS	AUT	BEL (Fl)	BEL (Wa)	CAN	CIS	DEN	FRA	GER	NL	SWI	US	Certifications	Album
"Mani për money"	2013	—	—	—	—	—	—	—	—	—	—	—	—	—		Non-album singles
"A po don?"	2014	—	—	—	—	—	—	—	—	—	—	—	—	—		Non-album singles
"E dehun" (featuring Mixey)	2014	—	—	—	—	—	—	—	—	—	—	—	—	—		Non-album singles
"13"	2014	—	—	—	—	—	—	—	—	—	—	—	—	—		Non-album singles
"Njo si ti"	2015	—	—	—	—	—	—	—	—	—	—	—	—	—		Non-album singles
"Shumë pis" (featuring Ledri Vula)	2015	15	—	—	—	—	—	—	—	—	—	—	—	—		Non-album singles
"BonBon"	2016	1	46	19	— (Note: "BonBon" did not enter Flemish' Ultratop 50 chart, but was registered on the Ultratip Bubbling Under ranking.)	39	95	10	38	29	10	26	39	— (Note: "BonBon" did not enter the Billboard Hot 100 chart, but peaked at number 13 and 16 on the Hot Dance/Electronic Songs and Dance/Electronic Digital Song rankings, respectively.)	ARIA: Gold; BVMI: Gold; FIMI: Gold; IFPI Danmark: Gold; MC: Gold; NVPI: Gold; SNEP: Platinum	Non-album singles
"Redrum" (featuring Felix Snow)	2017	1	—	—	—	—	—	26	—	—	—	—	—	— (Note: "Redrum" did not enter the Billboard Hot 100 chart, but peaked at number 45 on the Dance/Electronic Songs ranking.)		Non-album singles
"No I Love Yous" (featuring French Montana)	2017	3	—	—	—	—	—	—	—	—	—	—	—	—		Non-album singles
"Origami" (featuring Maphorisa)	2018	21	—	—	—	—	—	—	—	—	—	—	—	—		Non-album singles
"Prisoner"	2018	22	—	—	—	—	—	—	—	—	—	—	—	—		Non-album singles
"Oh God" (featuring Konshens)	2018	17	—	—	—	—	—	—	—	—	—	—	—	—		Non-album singles
"Selfish" (with Dimitri Vegas & Like Mike)	2019	51	—	—	29	— (Note: "Selfish" did not enter Walloon's Ultratop 50 chart, but was registered on the Ultratip Bubbling Under ranking.)	—	—	—	—	—	—	—	— (Note: "Selfish" did not enter the Billboard Hot 100 chart, but peaked at number 1, 18 and 26 on the Dance Club Songs, Dance/Mix Show Airplay and Dance/Electronic Songs rankings, respectively.)		Non-album singles
"Nuk e di" (featuring Nora Istrefi)	2019	17	—	—	—	—	—	—	—	—	—	—	—	—		Non-album singles
"Sayonara детка" (with Eldzhey)	2019	—	—	—	—	—	—	11	—	—	—	—	—	—		Non-album singles
"—" denotes a recording that did not chart or was not released in that territory.

==== 2020s ====
List of singles in the 2020s decade, with selected chart positions
Title	Year	Peak chart positions			Album
Title	Year	ALB	GRE	SWI	Album
"No Maybes" (with Arash and Ilkay Sencan)	2020	—	—	—	Non-album singles
"Bebe"	2022	10	—	33	Non-album singles
"Tkrkt"	2022	19	—	—	Non-album singles
"Hala" (with Don Xhoni)	2022	1	—	25	Non-album singles
"5AM" (with Buta)	2022	54	—	66	Non-album singles
"Idiot"	2022	—	—	78	Non-album singles
"Ta du"	2023	—	—	—	Non-album singles
"Lonely" (with Butrint Imeri)	2023	—	—	—	Non-album singles
"Mona Lisa"	2024	—	—	—	Non-album singles
"Më humbe"	2024	—	—	—	Non-album singles
"Ama" (with Noizy)	2024	—	71	—	Non-album singles
"Take a look" (with Noizy)	2024	—	—	—	Non-album singles
"Heat"	2024	—	—	—	Non-album singles
"Carbon2000"	2025	—	—	—	Non-album singles
"Million $$$ Man"	2025	—	—	—	Non-album singles
"—" denotes a recording that did not chart or was not released in that territory.

=== As featured artist ===
List of singles as featured artist, with selected chart positions and certifications
Title	Year	Peak chart positions										Certifications	Album
Title	Year	AUT	BEL (Fl)	BEL (Wa)	FRA	GER	ITA	NL	SPA	SWE	SWI	Certifications	Album
"Live It Up" (Nicky Jam featuring Will Smith and Era Istrefi)	2018	17	23	2	35	21	68	78	59	24	32	IFPI SWI: Gold	Non-album single
"Anything More" (Steve Aoki featuring Era Istrefi)	2018	—	—	—	—	—	—	—	—	—	—		Neon Future III
"Purpose" (Jonas Blue featuring Era Istrefi)	2018	—	—	—	—	—	—	—	—	—	—		Blue
"Let's Get Married" (Yellow Claw featuring Offset and Era Istrefi)	2019	—	—	—	—	—	—	—	—	—	—		Never Dies
"—" denotes a recording that did not chart or was not released in that territory.
