= Top Music Awards 2016 =

Albanian music awards ceremony

2016 Top Music Awards
- Location: Palace of Congresses, Tirana, Albania
- Hosted by: Ledion Liço
- Website: Official Website

Television/radio coverage
- Network: Top Channel; Top Albania Radio

The 2016 Top Music Awards, also known as Top Awards 2016, was held at the Pallati i Kongreseve in the capital city of Tirana, Albania, on 25 June 2016 and was broadcast live on Top Channel.

Noizy was nominated for five awards followed by Era Istrefi, Elvana Gjata and Kida who were nominated for four awards. Era Istrefi and Alban Skënderaj won three awards, becoming the most awarded artist of the night.

== Winners and nominees ==
The winners of Top Music Awards 2016 are highlighted in Bold and were announced live in June 2016.

=== Female Artist of the Year ===
- **Era Istrefi**
  - Elvana Gjata
  - Kida
  - Enca
  - Nora Istrefi

=== Male Artist of the Year ===
- **Alban Skënderaj**
  - Ledri Vula
  - Flori Mumajesi
  - Noizy
  - Capital T

=== Group of the Year ===
- **NRG Band**
  - Asgjë Sikur Dielli
  - Troja
  - Kaos

=== Video of the Year ===
- **Capital T—"Hitman"**
  - Ledri Vula—"Kings"
  - MC Kresha—"Era"
  - Troja—"A E Man N'Men"
  - Dafina Zeqiri feat. Mixey—"Liri"

=== Avantgarde Artist ===
- **MC Kresha**
  - Era Istrefi
  - Noizy
  - Edona Vatoci

=== Song of the Year ===
- **Era Istrefi—"BonBon"**
  - Majk feat. Ghetto Geasy—"S'Jena Mo"
  - Elvana Gjata feat. Bruno—"Love Me"
  - Era Istrefi feat. Ledri Vula—"Shume Pis"
  - Noizy—"Number One"
  - Mozzik feat. Kida–"Premtimet"
  - 2 Ton—"Ani Nasht"
  - 2po2 feat. Flori Mumajesi—"Gone Girl"
  - MC Kresha—"Era"
  - Alban Skënderaj—"Unë Dhe Ti"
