= Bebe (Era Istrefi song) =

2022 single by Era Istrefi

Single by Era Istrefi
- Language: Albanian
- Released: 1 April 2022; 8 August 2025 (re-release)
- Genre: EDM; electro dance; pop; R&B; urban
- Length: 2:28
- Label: Bzzz; Leaf
- Songwriters: Era Istrefi; BimBimma
- Producers: Era Istrefi; Claydee

Era Istrefi singles chronology
| "No Maybes" (2020) | "Bebe" (2022) | "Tkrkt" (2022) |

Music video
- "Bebe" on YouTube

"Bebe" (stylized in all caps) is a song by Kosovo-Albanian singer Era Istrefi. It was released on 1 April 2022 by Bzzz and Leaf. The song was written by BimBimma and Istrefi, and produced by the latter together with Claydee. An Albanian-language EDM, electro dance, pop, R&B and urban song, it lyrically explores themes of sexual desire, fantasies and physical attraction.

"Bebe" received acclaim from music critics upon release, several of whom praised the production, music video as well as Istrefi's appearance and vocal delivery. Commercially, the song reached number ten in Albania and the top 40 in Switzerland. An accompanying music video was uploaded to Istrefi's YouTube channel on 31 March 2022. The old school-described video was filmed in Switzerland and portrays Istrefi in different styles and settings.

== Background and composition ==
Istrefi started to pursue a professional music career in 2013 and attained international recognition in early 2016, following her breakthrough single, "BonBon". The single subsequently secured her a recording contract with Ultra Music, before she left the label for internal issues in early 2022. Serving as her first single in over two years after "No Maybes", Istrefi unveiled the cover art for "Bebe" on her social media accounts prior to its premiere and announced the song's music video release date as 31 March 2022. Bzzz and Leaf then released it as a single on digital download and streaming formats the following day on 1 April 2022.

With a length of two minutes and 28 seconds, "Bebe" was written by Istrefi and Kosovo-Albanian rapper BimBimma. Istrefi also produced the song with Greek-Albanian artist Claydee, who had been involved in the creation of Istrefi's previous single, "Nuk E Di". Kosovo-Albanian producer BigBang and Greek producer Paris Kalpos were further credited as the creators of the beats. "Bebe" is characterised as a song incorporating multiple genres, including EDM, electro dance, pop, R&B and urban. The song finds Istrefi exploring the themes of sexual desire and fantasies coupled with the physical attraction of two people in the song's Albanian-language lyrics.

== Reception ==
"Bebe" received generally positive reviews from music critics. Zangba Thomson, writing for Bong Mines Entertainment, ensured a positive perception of the song, acknowledging the "catchy" chorus and "ear-pleasing" vocals. Thomson further felt that "[Bebe] serves as a tasty appetizer to what listeners can expect to hear from Istrefi in the near future". Another editor from Illyrian Pirates described Istrefi as an "epitome of an empowered and sex-positive young woman" and attended to commend Istrefi's vocal delivery as well as the song's melodies and production. Favoring the singer's comeback, Sindi Reka from Top Albania Radio wrote that "they had missed [Istrefi's] particular style". Commercially, upon trending on Spotify, the song reached number 33 on the Swiss singles chart, as Istrefi's third charting record in Switzerland.

== Music video ==
An accompanying music video for "Bebe" was uploaded to Istrefi's YouTube channel on 31 March 2022 at 18:00 (CET). Behind-the-scenes footage was broadcast on Top Channel's programme Goca dhe Gra on 30 March 2022. Filmed in Switzerland, the music video was directed by Fati and produced by Samet Kaya, with the former and Enis Shaqiri hired as the directors of photography. It features scenes of Istrefi appearing in different styles and settings, including in an exclusive area filled with antique and high-value-described objects, a high-profile-defined club, a luxury retro bar and in the vicinity of a Bentley. Reviewers were positive towards the music video, complimenting the settings as well as Istrefi's hairstyles and outfits. While Thomson labelled it an "appealing" video, the editor of Illyrian Pirates concluded that '[Istrefi] offers an old-school style to the table" adding that "the visual fits the track well".

== Charts ==
Chart performance for "Bebe"
| Chart (2022) | Peak position |
|---|---|
| Switzerland (Schweizer Hitparade) | 33 |

== Release history ==
Release dates and formats for "Bebe"
| Region | Date | Format(s) | Label(s) | Ref. |
|---|---|---|---|---|
| Various | 1 April 2022 | Digital download; streaming | Bzzz; Leaf | |
