= Redrum (Era Istrefi song) =

2017 single by Era Istrefi featuring Felix Snow

Single by Era Istrefi featuring Felix Snow
- Released: 24 February 2017
- Genre: Dance; pop; R&B
- Length: 2:49
- Label: B1; Ultra
- Songwriters: Era Istrefi; David Singer; William Vanderhayden
- Producers: Felix Snow; Mark Ralph

Era Istrefi singles chronology
"BonBon" (2016)	"Redrum" (2017)	"No I Love Yous" (2017)

Music video
- "Redrum" on YouTube

"Redrum" (palindrome for "Murder") is a song by Kosovar and Albanian singer Era Istrefi, featuring Australian producer Felix Snow. It was released on 24 February 2017 through B1 and Ultra Music. Written by Istrefi, David Singer and William Vanderhayden, and produced by Snow and Mark Ralph, "Redrum" is a dance, pop and R&B song that lyrically focuses on the concept of materialism.

"Redrum" garnered positive reviews from music critics, who praised its appeal and lyrics as well as Istrefi's vocal delivery. A femme fatale-influenced music video was uploaded to Ultra's YouTube channel simultaneously with the single's release, portraying Istrefi within a murderous aesthetic. Commercially, the song peaked atop the charts in Albania and reached the top 30 in the Commonwealth of Independent States (CIS) as well as the top 50 on the US Billboard Dance/Electronic Songs chart.

== Background and composition ==
Era Istrefi began pursuing a professional music career in 2013 and rose to international attention, following her breakthrough single, "BonBon" (2016), in early 2016. Released as her follow-up single to the latter under B1 and Ultra, "Redrum" was released for digital download and streaming on 24 February 2017. Istrefi wrote it with David Singer and William Vanderhayden, while Felix Snow and Mark Ralph produced it. The song's title is a palindrome for "Murder" that emerged from a scene in the psychological horror film The Shining (1980). "Redrum" is a dance, pop and R&B song, going "heavy" on the hooks and "delicately" on its production. Written from the perspective of a woman who is not impressed by materialism, the lyrics find Istrefi telling her love interest that she needs him to remain true to himself and even though she knows the relationship is deficient, she is willing to see it through. Lyrics include: "My love is bittersweet, but I can show you heaven but first get on your knees, close your eyes and count to seven/ I don't care if you're a peasant or a king, If you're with me then you're everything."

== Reception ==
Upon release, "Redrum" received positive reviews from music critics. Truman Ports of V acknowledged the song's lyrics to preserve "something mysterious and threatening" and lauded Istrefi's "sensual" and "commanding" vocals as well as her expressions during her visual performance. According to Beautiful Buzzz's Mike Doose, the song possesses "the sex appeal of Dua Lipa and Rihanna" along with the "mystique and allure of AlunaGeorge and Kiiara", also noting its potential to be a "global hit across continents and cultures". BigFM's staff commended Istrefi's fashion within a "killer aesthetic" and described the song to be a "bit calmer and with less Balkan flair" than her breakthrough single, "BonBon". Jonathan Currinn from Critic Jonni similarly expressed a similar opinion regarding the song, writing that it's "a definite step in the right direction, showing her off perfectly as an artist". Commercially, "Redrum" topped the charts in Albania for the week ending on 12 March 2017. The song also reached number 26 in the Commonwealth of Independent States (CIS) and number 45 on the US Billboard Dance/Electronic Songs chart.

== Music video ==
A music video for "Redrum" was uploaded to Ultra's YouTube channel simultaneously with the single's release on 24 February 2017. Production team SixTwentySix was hired for the shooting of the video, while Millicent Hailes directed it. A red-themed video, the visual opens with Istrefi walking with red knee-high boots and a red sheer cape flowing behind her. Scenes interspersed through the main plot portray the singer performing in a red-color setting surrounded by smoke. Other notable scenes include a shot of Istrefi's nails with blood dripping down her finger as well as a shot of her in front of a mirror. The video was received positively by reviewers. Ports pointed out femme fatale influences in the video, and praised Istrefi's red-colored fashion further saying that it fits the video's "murderous aesthetic". Currinn described the video as being a "great visual" and wrote that there is "something interesting to watch and keep the audience entertained, but at the same time, it doesn't give anything new to the viewers".

== Credits and personnel ==
Credits adapted from Spotify and YouTube.

Technical credits

- Era Istrefi – lead artist, songwriting
- Felix Snow – featured artist, producing
- David Singer – songwriting
- Mark Ralph – producing
- William Vanderhayden – songwriting

Music video credits

- Austin Barbera – producing
- Christ Varonos – producing manager
- Jake Krask – producing
- Jen Kennedy – editing
- Luis Panch Perez – directing of photography
- Millicent Hailes – directing
- Skye Jones – producing designer

== Charts ==
=== Weekly charts ===
Weekly chart performance for "Redrum"
Chart (2017)	Peak position
Albania (The Top List)	1
CIS (TopHit)	25
Russia Airplay (TopHit)	23
US Hot Dance/Electronic Songs (Billboard)	45

=== Monthly charts ===
Monthly chart performance for "Redrum"
Chart (2017)	Peak position
CIS (TopHit)	100
Russia Airplay (TopHit)	25

== Release history ==
Release dates and formats for "Redrum"
Region	Date	Format(s)	Label(s)	Ref.
Various	24 February 2017	Digital download; streaming	B1; Ultra	
France	26 February 2017	Radio airplay	Sony	
Italy	17 March 2017	Radio airplay	Sony	
