= Don Xhoni =

Kosovo-Albanian rapper (born 2000)

- Born: Xhonatan Isufi; 8 April 2000 (age 26); Çikatovë e Re, Drenas, FR Yugoslavia
- Occupation: Rapper
- Years active: 2018 – present
- Musical career
- Genre: Hip hop

Xhonatan Isufi (Albanian: [ˈdʒɔnatan iˈsufi]; born 8 April 2000), known professionally as Don Xhoni, is a Kosovo-Albanian rapper.

== Life and career ==
=== 2000–present: Early life and career beginnings ===
Xhonatan Isufi was born on 8 April 2000 in the village of Çikatovë e Re, near Drenas, then part of the Federal Republic of Yugoslavia, present-day Kosovo. After rising to prominence, Isufi was featured on Albanian singer Enca's "Break Down" in July 2020. The song attained commercial success in Albania, reaching number 1 on the country's Top 100 chart. He further gained international recognition in late 2020, after his single, "Make a pose (Freestyle)", turned viral on the social media platform TikTok. Isufi's chart success ensued into October 2021 with the single, "Trust me", which peaked at number 13 in Albania and number 72 in Switzerland. By November 2021, his collaboration with Swiss-Albanian rapper Loredana on his follow-up "Gjuj për to" had reached the top five in Albania and number 32 in Swiss Singles Top 100 chart. A month later, he was featured on Kosovo-Albanian singer Butrint Imeri's successful single "Corazon" in December 2021.

== Discography ==
=== Extended plays ===
- Shah mat (2022)

=== Singles ===
==== As lead artist ====
List of singles as lead artist, with selected chart positions
Title	Year	Peak chart positions			Album
Title	Year	ALB	GRE	SWI	Album
"Jena me ekip"	2018	—	—	—	Non-album singles
"Ajo don"	2019	—	—	—	Non-album singles
"Tjera llafe"	2020	—	—	—	Non-album singles
"Baby"	2020	—	—	—	Non-album singles
"Cash Cash"	2020	—	—	—	Non-album singles
"Alles Gute Criminale"	2020	—	—	—	Non-album singles
"Make a pose (Freestyle)"	2020	—	—	—	Non-album singles
"Kokaina"	2020	—	—	—	Non-album singles
"Maffia"	2021	—	—	—	Non-album singles
"Une foli i fundit"	2021	—	—	—	Non-album singles
"Deri kur"	2021	—	—	—	Non-album singles
"Trust me"	2021	13	—	72	Non-album singles
"Gjuj për to" (featuring Loredana)	2021	2	—	36	Non-album singles
"Albaner"	2022	—	—	—	Non-album singles
"Crypto"	2022	—	—	—	Non-album singles
"Katile"	2022	—	—	38	Non-album singles
"Hala" (with Era Istrefi)	2022	23	—	25	Non-album singles
"Rruga"	2023	—	—	—	Non-album singles
"Ike"	2023	—	—	80	Non-album singles
"A m'don"	2023	—	—	—	Non-album singles
"Ju përshëndes!"	2023	—	—	—	Non-album singles
"Lej" (with Dhurata Dora)	2023	—	10	12	Non-album singles
"Shoki (Freestyle)"	2024	—	—	62	Non-album singles
"Kokaina 2.0" (with Gzuz)	2024	—	45	45	Non-album singles
"M'fal"	2024	—	—	—	Non-album singles
"—" denotes a recording that did not chart or was not released in that territory.

==== As featured artist ====
List of singles as featured artist, with selected chart positions
Title	Year	Peak chart positions		Album
Title	Year	ALB	SWI	Album
"Break Down" (Enca featuring Don Xhoni)	2020	11	—	Non-album singles
"Corazon" (Butrint Imeri featuring Don Xhoni)	2021	5	35	Non-album singles
"—" denotes a recording that did not chart or was not released in that territory.
