= Selfish (Dimitri Vegas & Like Mike and Era Istrefi song) =

2019 single by Dimitri Vegas & Like Mike and Era Istrefi

Single by Dimitri Vegas & Like Mike featuring Era Istrefi
- Released: 15 February 2019
- Genre: Dance-pop; electro-pop; moombahton
- Length: 2:47
- Label: Epic Amsterdam; Smash The House
- Songwriters: Angemi Antonini; Bas van Dalen; Dan Book; David Paich; Dimitri Thivaios; Jeff Porcaro; Maria Smith; Michael Thivaios; Victor Thell
- Producers: Dimitri Thivaios; Michael Thivaios

Dimitri Vegas & Like Mike singles chronology
"Daar gaat ze (Nooit verdiend)" (2019)	"Selfish" (2019)	"B.F.A. (Best Friend's Ass)" (2019)

Era Istrefi singles chronology
"Oh God" (2018)	"Selfish" (2019)	"Nuk E Di" (2019)

Music video
- "Selfish" on YouTube

"Selfish" is a song by Belgian disc jockey duo Dimitri Vegas & Like Mike and Kosovar singer Era Istrefi. It was produced by the duo, who served as songwriters alongside Angemi Antonini, Bas van Dalen, Dan Book, David Paich, Jeff Porcaro, Maria Smith and Victor Thell. The song was released as a single for digital download and streaming on 15 February 2019 by Epic Amsterdam and Smash The House. Interpolating Toto's "Africa", it is a dance-pop, electro-pop and moombahton love song, displaying the romantic affection of a couple that cannot resist keeping their hands off of each other.

Reception from music critics of "Selfish" was positive upon its release, with praise concentrated on Dimitri Vegas & Like Mike's production and Istrefi's vocal delivery. Commercially, the song peaked atop the US Billboard Dance Club Songs chart and reached number 26 on the Hot Dance/Electronic Songs chart, while peaking at number 29 in Belgium. An accompanying music video was uploaded to the duo's YouTube channel on 15 February 2019, featuring Istrefi performing in a colorful setting. Prior to its release, the song was performed at Tomorrowland's Garden of Madness in December 2018.

== Background and composition ==
Dimitri Thivaios (Dimitri Vegas) and Michael Thivaios (Like Mike) produced "Selfish" and served as songwriters alongside Angemi Antonini, Bas van Dalen, Dan Book, David Paich, Jeff Porcaro, Maria Smith and Victor Thell. Regarding the collaboration with Istrefi, the duo stated that "we had heard about [Istrefi] through [...] 'BonBon' (2015) and knew she would be a fantastic singer to work with on a future song". It was released as a single for digital download and streaming in various countries on 15 February 2019 by Epic Amsterdam and Smash The House. Several remixes of the song from multiple artists were issued by the aforementioned labels on 19 April 2019. Musically, "Selfish" is a warm-described dance-pop, electro-pop and moombahton love song, displaying the romantic affection of a couple that cannot resist keeping their hands off of each other. The song prominently interpolates the refrain from American band Toto's single "Africa" (1982).

== Reception ==
"Selfish" was met with critical acclaim from music critics, with several of them highlighting the song's sampling, Dimitri Vegas & Like Mike's production and Istrefi's vocal delivery. Henry Einck, writing for Dance Charts, praised the song's versatility and similarly noted its potential to become a hit among mainstream listeners. CelebMix's Jonathan Currinn commended the song's "brilliantly crafted" lyrics and wrote "[the song] is full of tropical vibes, exciting [...] for Miami Music Week and Ibiza season". Commercially, "Selfish" peaked atop the US Billboard Dance Club Songs chart on 27 July 2019 and reached number 26 on the Hot Dance/Electronic Songs ranking a week prior. The song reached number 29 in Belgium. It further failed to enter the ranking on Walloon's Ultratop 50 chart, but was registered on the Ultratip Bubbling Under.

== Promotion and music video ==
Scene of the colourful-described music video, depicting Istrefi lying in a setting decorated with plastic cups and floating gummy bears.

Prior to release, Dimitri Vegas & Like Mike as well as Istrefi premiered "Selfish" at Tomorrowland's Garden of Madness in December 2018 in Antwerp, Belgium. A music video for "Selfish" was uploaded to Dimitri Vegas & Like Mike's YouTube channel on 15 February 2019. Directed and produced by YHELLOW, the colourful video prominently features scenes of Istrefi performing in a setting decorated with plastic cups and giant floating gummy bears. It also captures the morning after the night of a party, with a couple waking up and spending the day together, before the woman realises it was all a dream.

== Track listing ==
- Digital download and streaming
1. "Selfish" – 2:47
2. "Selfish" (Syn Cole Remix) – 3:00
3. "Selfish" (M-22 Remix) – 3:10
4. "Selfish" (Jay Frog and DJ Falk Remix) – 2:37
5. "Selfish" (Ale Mora Remix) – 3:20
6. "Selfish" (HIDDN Remix) – 2:57
7. "Selfish" (Angemi Remix) – 4:10
8. "Selfish" (DVLM and Brennan Heart VIP Remix) – 2:53
9. "Selfish" (Maurice West Remix) – 3:29
10. "Selfish" (MATTN and D-Wayne Remix) – 3:39

== Charts ==
=== Weekly charts ===
Weekly chart performance for "Selfish"
Chart (2019)	Peak position
Belgium (Ultratop 50 Flanders)	29
US Dance Club Songs (Billboard)	1
US Hot Dance/Electronic Songs (Billboard)	26

=== Year-end charts ===
Year-end chart performance for "Selfish"
Chart (2019)	Position
Belgium (Ultratop Flanders)	89
US Dance Club Songs (Billboard)	3
US Hot Dance/Electronic Songs (Billboard)	91

== Release history ==
Release dates and formats for "Selfish"
Region	Date	Format(s)	Version	Label(s)	Ref.
Various	15 February 2019	Digital download; streaming	Original	Epic Amsterdam; Smash The House	
CIS	20 February 2019	Radio airplay	Original	SME	
Various	19 April 2019	Digital download; streaming	Remixes	Epic Amsterdam; Smash The House	

== See also ==
- List of Billboard Dance Club Songs number ones of 2019
