= Tkrkt =

2022 single by Era Istrefi

Single by Era Istrefi
- Language: Albanian, English
- Released: 21 May 2022
- Genre: EDM; pop; reggaeton
- Length: 1:53
- Label: Leaf
- Songwriter: Era Istrefi
- Producers: Claydee; Paris Kalpos

Era Istrefi singles chronology
"Bebe" (2022)	"Tkrkt" (2022)	"Hala" (2022)

Music video
- "Tkrkt" on YouTube

"Tkrkt" is a song by Kosovo-Albanian singer Era Istrefi. It was released on 21 May 2022 through Leaf. Written by Istrefi and produced by Claydee and Paris Kalpos, "Tkrkt" is an EDM, pop and reggaeton song with afro-pop and dancehall elements. Lyrically, the song is an ode to a woman's pleasure of having fun and partying with friends. Upon release, "Tkrkt" received widespread acclaim from music critics. Praise was directed towards its composition and production as well as Istrefi's appearance and fashion. Commercially, the song reached number 19 in Albania. Filmed in Dubai, UAE, an accompanying music video was uploaded to Istrefi's YouTube channel on 21 May 2022. With observers complimenting the visual and its location, it depicts the singer performing the song in different exclusive-described settings.

== Background and composition ==
"Tkrkt" was released as a single for digital download and streaming by Leaf in various territories on 21 May 2022. Lasting one minute and 53 seconds, the song was written by Istrefi and produced by Claydee and Paris Kalpos. Claydee has been involved in the creation of several singles by Istrefi, including "Nuk E Di" (2019) and "Bebe" (2022). The song is a dance and rhythmic Albanian and English-language EDM, pop and reggaeton track with afro-pop and dancehall influences. Speaking lyrically about women and Jimmy Choo high heels, it is an ode to a woman's pleasure of having fun and partying with friends.

== Reception ==
"Tkrkt" was met with positive reviews from music critics upon release. Writing for Bong Mines Entertainment, Zangba Thomson described the song as a "dance-friendly" tune, highlighting its composition, production and Istrefi's vocals. Another editor from Music Arena Gh commended the "great" instrumentation and noticed "the tendency [of Tkrkt] to keep you moving your body". Burim Pacolli for Nacionale considered it as "one of the best songs of the year". Commercially, "Tkrkt" reached number 19 in Albania for the week ending 28 May 2022.

== Music video ==
A music video for "Tkrkt was uploaded to Istrefi's official YouTube channel on 21 May 2022. Filmed in Dubai, UAE, the video was directed by Fati.tv of Fati Media Group, while Besian Kukiqi was hired as the producer and Enis Shaqiri as the director of photography. It features scenes of Istrefi in an exclusive-described indoor location that is decorated with antique and high-value art as well as filled with partying people. The following scene portrays her inside a high-profile-characterised exclusive night club, performing to the song on top of a plush leather sofa. Interspersed shots show the singer accompanied by several mask-wearing dancers inside a setting with an array of spotlights and flashing lights. It further contains appearances by Ariane, Elena, Ikom Boy, Neechen and Simon Desue. The video was met with generally positive reviews from critics, with several of them praising its location as well as Istrefi's appearance and fashion. The writer from Music Arena Gh designated it as "classy" and "plush".

== Track listing ==
- Digital download and streaming
1. "Tkrkt" – 1:53
2. "Tkrkt" (Anso Remix) – 2:07
3. "Tkrkt" (Gravagerz Remix) – 2:34
4. "Tkrkt" (Lii Remix) – 2:01

== Charts ==
Chart performance for "Tkrkt"
Chart (2022)	Peak position
Albania (The Top List)	19

== Release history ==
Release dates and formats for "Tkrkt"
Region	Date	Format(s)	Label	Ref.
Various	21 May 2022	Digital download; streaming	Leaf	
