= Hala (song) =

2022 single by Don Xhoni and Era Istrefi

Single by Don Xhoni and Era Istrefi
- Language: Albanian
- Released: 30 September 2022
- Length: 2:38
- Label: AVD Digital
- Songwriters: Don Xhoni; Era Istrefi
- Producer: Çelik Lipa

Don Xhoni singles chronology
"Katile" (2022)	"Hala" (2022)

Era Istrefi singles chronology
"Tkrkt" (2022)	"Hala" (2022)	"5AM" (2022)

Music video
- "Hala" on YouTube

"Hala" is a song by Kosovar rapper Don Xhoni and Kosovo-Albanian singer Era Istrefi. It was released on 30 September 2022 through AVD Digital. The song was written by the artists and produced by Çelik Lipa. It topped the charts in Albania, and reached number 25 in Switzerland.

== Background and composition ==
Beginning in May 2022, Don Xhoni shared a short video on his Instagram story, in which he listened to Istrefi's preceding single "Tkrkt" (2022) in a car, prompting speculation of a possible collaboration. Rumors of a collaborative song and an ongoing romance continued to increase in September, when a video of the artists hugging each other in Pristina, Kosovo, began circulating on social media. They eventually confirmed their collaboration on 23 September and announced its release date for 30 September, by uploading photographs on their Instagram accounts that appeared to be behind-the-scenes shots from the music video with a caption that read, "We set the autumn vibes. See you on thursday at 23:59". "Hala" was produced by Çelik Lipa, who wrote it alongside Don Xhoni and Istrefi. The song was released as a single for digital download and streaming by AVD Digital in various territories on the scheduled date. It is an Albanian-language pop song, backed by a rhythmic drum-laden instrumentation. The lyrics explore a couple's perplexing relationship, with the desire to know if they are still in love with each other.

== Reception ==
"Hala" was met with mixed to positive reviews from music critics upon release. Zangba Thomson of Bong Mines Entertainment deemed it as "spicy" and lauded the song's "adventurous storyline". Sindi Reka from Top Albania Radio linked a song's lyric to be a dedication to Don Xhoni's past romance with a Russian model. Burim Pacolli for Nacionale labeled the song's melody as "typical Balkanic" and stated that starting "from the first moment when [you] hear the melody, the red flag goes up." In questioning Istref's development from "being the most special" to someone "obsessed with extravagant looks", he further criticised Don Xhoni's parts for possessing "absolutely zero content and creativity". Commercially, "Hala" debuted at number 25 on the Swiss Singles Chart issue dated 9 October 2022. The song was further listed at number 14 on the Billboard Switzerland Songs ranking.

== Music video ==
An accompanying music video for "Hala" was uploaded to Don Xhoni's official YouTube channel on 30 September 2022 at 23:59 (CET). The video trended on the aforementioned platform in several countries, including Albania, Austria, Germany, Greece, Italy, Sweden, Switzerland and the United Kingdom. It garnered more than one million views in less than 24 hours upon its release. The 2 minutes and 41 second lasting video starts out with Don Xhoni escaping from prison through an underground tunnel. The rapper then appears in an elegantly described gentleman's club, with Istrefi pole dancing in the center of the stage. Next, he begins to flirt with her, whereupon the club owner orders his security guards to take the rapper out of the club.

== Charts ==
Chart performance for "Hala"
Chart (2022)	Peak position
Switzerland (Schweizer Hitparade)	25

== Release history ==
Release dates and formats for "Hala"
Region	Date	Format(s)	Label	Ref.
Various	30 September 2022	Digital download; streaming	AVD Digital	
