= Live It Up (Nicky Jam song) =

Single by Nicky Jam featuring Will Smith and Era Istrefi
- Language: English; Spanish
- Released: May 25, 2018
- Genre: Techno; reggae
- Length: 3:28
- Label: Sony Latin
- Songwriters: Marty James; Will Smith; Jean-Baptiste; Thomas Wesley Pentz; Nick Rivera Caminero; Quavious Marshall; Jocelyn Donald; Clement Picard; Juan Diego Medina Vélez; Maxime Picard; Era Istrefi; Michael McHenry
- Producers: Diplo; The Picard Brothers; Free School

Nicky Jam singles chronology
"Get Lit" (2018)	"Live It Up" (2018)	"Icon (Remix)" (2018)

Will Smith singles chronology
"Get Lit" (2017)	"Live It Up" (2018)	"Está Rico" (2018)

Era Istrefi singles chronology
"Origami" (2018)	"Live It Up" (2018)	"Prisoner" (2018)

Music video
- "Live It Up" on YouTube

"Live It Up" is a single by American singer Nicky Jam, featuring American rapper Will Smith and Kosovar singer Era Istrefi. It was released on May 25, 2018, through Sony Latin, as the official song of the 2018 FIFA World Cup held in Russia. The song was produced by Diplo, The Picard Brothers and Free School. The song reached number one in Panama, and the top 10 in Hungary, Poland, Bolivia and Argentina. "Live It Up" received mixed to negative reviews from critics, many of whom criticised its generic sound and derided its detachment between the song and the host country of the tournament.

== Live performance ==
Jam, Smith and Istrefi performed the song at the closing ceremony on July 15, 2018 at the Luzhniki Stadium before the final match between France and Croatia.

== Music video ==
The music video for the song was released on June 8, 2018. It shows Jam, Smith and Istrefi, and the Brazilian footballer Ronaldinho, among images from the 2014 tournament, as well as the 1998, 2002 and 2010 tournaments. The video was directed by Yasha Malekzad, produced by Kasra Pezeshki and was filmed mainly in Moscow and Budapest, Hungary. By May 2021, the video had amassed over 218 million views on YouTube. However, it was later unlisted, possibly due to the 2022 Russian invasion of Ukraine and Will Smith slapping Chris Rock at the 94th Academy Awards.

== Critical reception ==
The song received mixed to negative reviews from critics. Roisin O'Connor of The Independent rated it with one out of five stars, criticized the track's "generic message" and called it a "blatant attempt to cash in on the music industry's current obsession with Latin American music, but the entire song makes zero sense when you remember the World Cup is being held in Russia this year". Ed Malyon of the same outlet criticized its "synthetic joy" and called it "the epitome of a try-hard creation that lacks much of what makes music great–inspiration and raw emotion–and lays on thick the things that we couldn't care less about–meaningless, directionless lyrics and a tiresome wailing from Istrefi, whose songwriting talent has clearly not been drawn on for this tragic effort". Dave Fawbert of ShortList named it the ninth worst World Cup song of all time, criticizing its lyrics: "The words in the chorus just don't fit. 'One life live it up cos you don't get it twice' [sic] is just unbelieveably clunky", and expressing confusion as to "why a World Cup in Russia should have a reggaeton anthem, while the shoehorning in of different artists in order to satisfy all global demographics is just patently cynical".

The song was met with mixed reviews from fans. Business Standard reported, "'Live It Up' has failed in getting a welcome reception from the fans. People on Twitter are requesting Shakira for a new song. Some have even asked FIFA to change the song." It further highlighted fans' statements that they would stick to K'naan's "Wavin' Flag" and Shakira's "Waka Waka", and the detachment between the song's genre and the tournament's host country. Scroll observed that fans "critiqued the fast pace of what they called was primarily a dance tune, noting the Diplo-produced track lacked a 'football rhythm' to it" and were "nostalgic for popular World Cup anthems in the past such as Shakira's 'Waka Waka' ... and Ricky Martin's 'The Cup of Life'".

== Credits and personnel ==
- Will Smith – composition, vocals
- Nicky Jam – composition, vocals
- Era Istrefi – composition, vocals
- Diplo – production.
- Karol G

== Charts ==
=== Weekly charts ===
Weekly chart performance for "Live It Up"
Chart (2018)	Peak position
Argentina (Monitor Latino)	7
Austria (Ö3 Austria Top 40)	17
Bolivia (Monitor Latino)	7
ERROR in "CIS": Invalid position: 236. Expected number 1–200 or dash (–).
Czech Republic Airplay (ČNS IFPI)	52
Czech Republic Singles Digital (ČNS IFPI)	67
France (SNEP)	35
Germany (GfK)	21
Hungary (Editors' Choice Top 40)	28
Hungary (Single Top 40)	2
Hungary (Stream Top 40)	17
Italy (FIMI)	68
Japan Hot 100 (Billboard)	71
Netherlands (Dutch Top 40)	25
Netherlands (Single Top 100)	78
Panama (Monitor Latino)	1
Poland Airplay (ZPAV)	6
Poland Dance (ZPAV)	1
Spain (Promusicae)	59
Sweden (Sverigetopplistan)	24
Switzerland (Schweizer Hitparade)	32

=== Year-end charts ===
Year-end chart performance for "Live It Up"
Chart (2018)	Position
Hungary (Single Top 40)	57

== Certifications ==
Region	Certification	Certified units/sales
Mexico (AMPROFON)	Gold	30,000^{‡}
Poland (ZPAV)	Platinum	50,000^{‡}
Switzerland (IFPI Switzerland)	Gold	10,000^{‡}
^{‡} Sales+streaming figures based on certification alone.

== Release history ==
Release dates and formats for "Live It Up"
Region	Date	Format(s)	Label	Ref.
Various	25 May 2018	Digital download; streaming	Sony	
