= 2018 FIFA World Cup final =

World Cup final, held in Russia

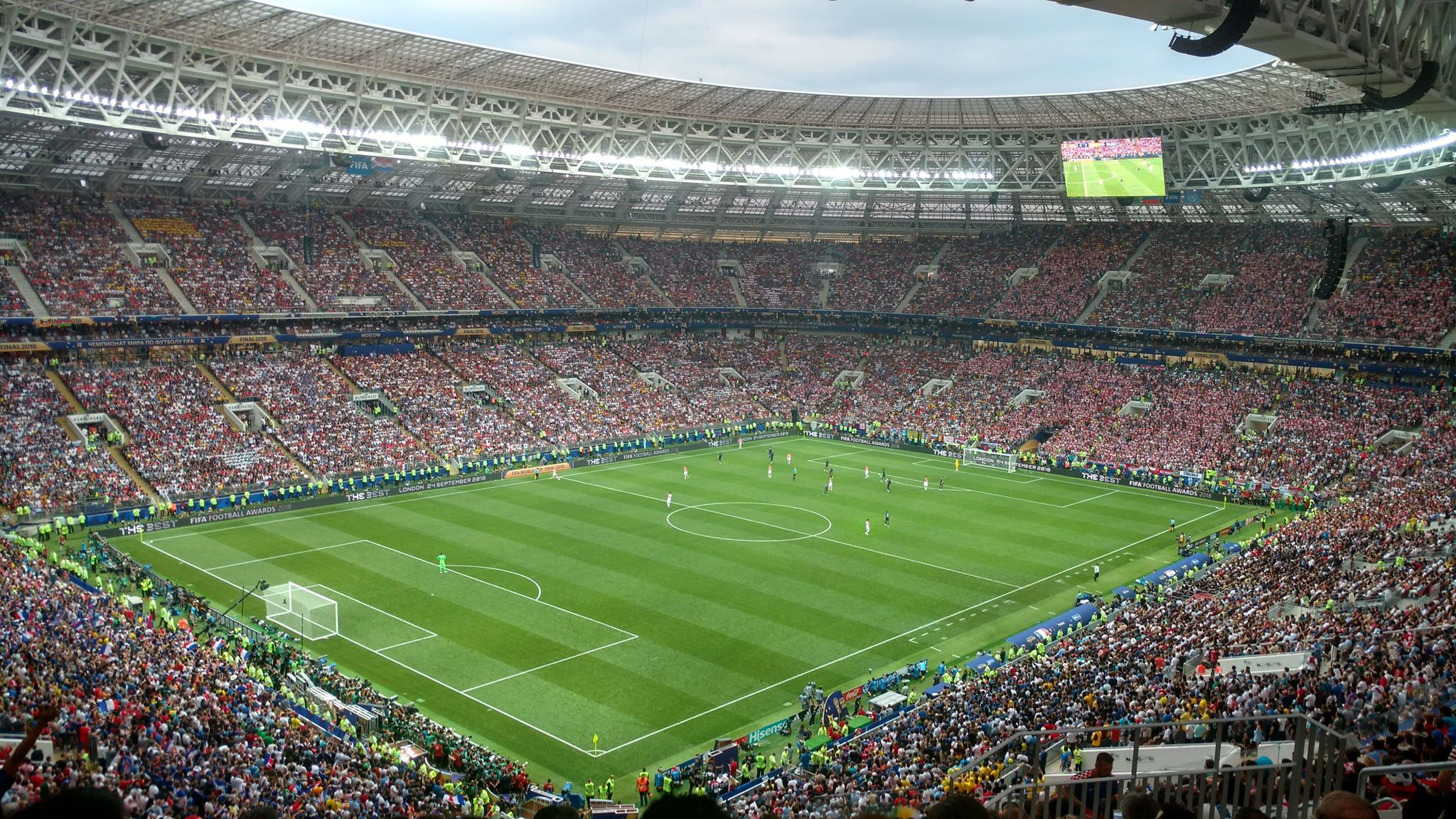
- A scene inside Luzhniki Stadium during the match.
- Event: 2018 FIFA World Cup
France	Croatia
4	2
- Date: 15 July 2018
- Venue: Luzhniki Stadium, Moscow
- Man of the Match: Antoine Griezmann (France)
- Referee: Néstor Pitana (Argentina)
- Attendance: 78,012
- Weather: Partly cloudy 27 °C (81 °F); 51% humidity

The final match of the 2018 FIFA World Cup, the 21st edition of FIFA's competition for national football teams, was played at the Luzhniki Stadium in Moscow, Russia, on 15 July 2018, and was contested by France and Croatia.

The tournament comprised hosts Russia and 31 other teams who emerged from the qualification phase, organised by the six FIFA confederations. The 32 teams competed in a group stage, from which 16 teams qualified for the knockout stage. En route to the final, France finished first in Group C, with two wins and a draw, after which they defeated Argentina in the round of 16, Uruguay in the quarter-final and Belgium in the semi-final. Croatia finished first in Group D with three wins, before defeating Denmark in the round of 16 and Russia in the quarter-final – both through a penalty shoot-out – and then England in the semi-final. The final took place in front of 78,011 supporters, with more than 1.1 billion watching on television, and was refereed by Néstor Pitana from Argentina.

France took the lead through a controversial free kick that led to an own goal by Mario Mandžukić in the 18th minute – the first own goal in a World Cup final – before Ivan Perišić equalised 10 minutes later with a low shot into the corner of the goal. Shortly afterwards, France were awarded a penalty when Pitana ruled that Perišić had deliberately handled the ball. The decision resulted from a consultation with the video assistant referee (VAR), which was in use for the first time in a World Cup at the 2018 tournament. The decision was criticised by some pundits such as Alan Shearer, who labelled it "ridiculous", while others such as Chris Waddle thought it was correct. Antoine Griezmann scored to give France a 2–1 half-time lead. They extended that lead in the 59th minute, when Paul Pogba scored at the second attempt after Croatia defender Dejan Lovren had blocked his initial shot. Kylian Mbappé scored from outside the penalty area to make it 4–1, becoming the second teenager to score in a World Cup final (after Pelé in 1958). In the 69th minute, Mandžukić capitalized on a Hugo Lloris error to score a second for Croatia. The final score was 4–2 to France.

France's win was their second World Cup title, following their victory in 1998, which they hosted. Griezmann was named the man of the match, while Croatia's Luka Modrić was awarded the Golden Ball as FIFA's outstanding player of the tournament. The final was the highest-scoring World Cup final since 1966 and currently the only final since 2002 to end in regulation time.

As of 2026, this was the most recent World Cup final that didn't feature the reigning champions.

== Background ==
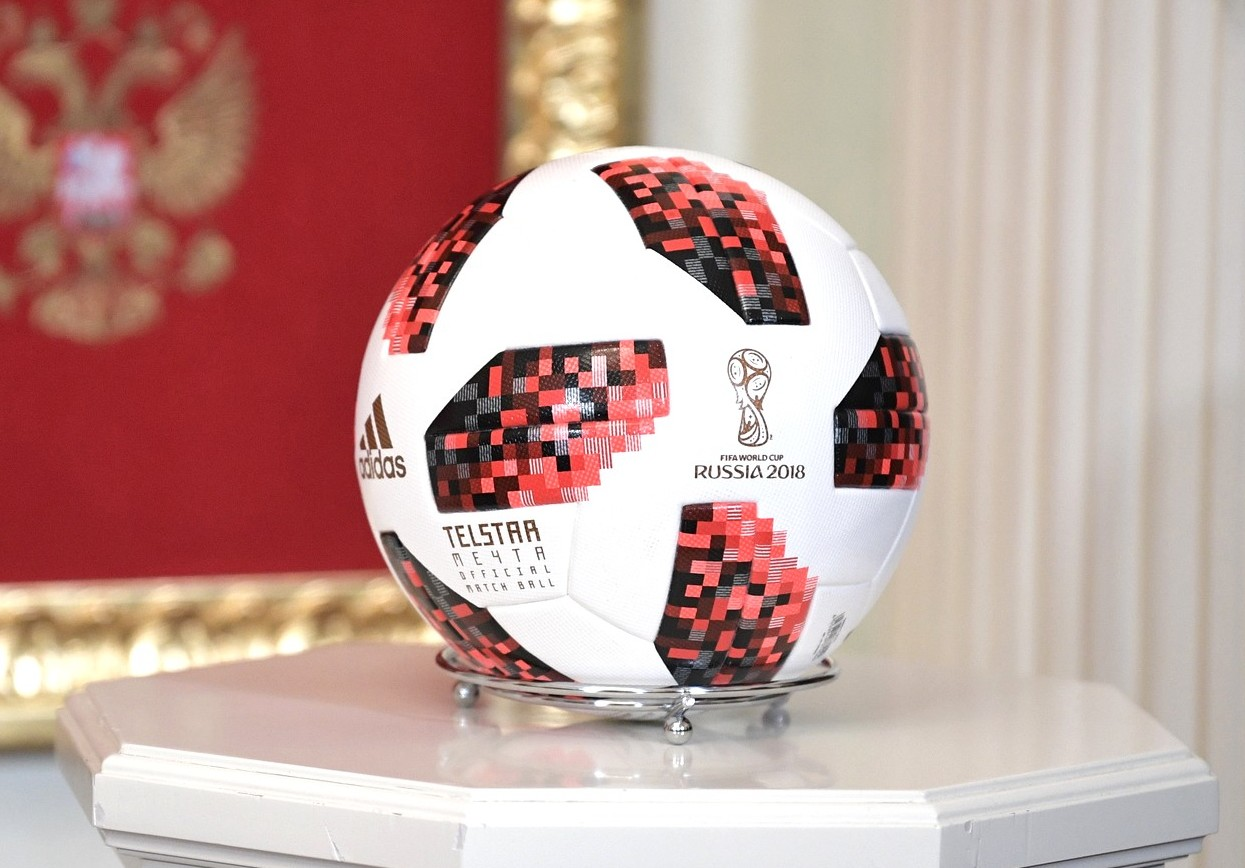
An example of the Adidas Telstar Mechta ball used in the match

The 2018 FIFA World Cup was the 21st edition of the World Cup, FIFA's football competition for national teams, held in Russia between 14 June and 15 July 2018. Russia qualified for the finals automatically as tournament hosts, while 208 teams competed for the remaining 31 spots through qualifying rounds organised by the six FIFA confederations and held between June 2015 and November 2017. In the finals, the teams were divided into eight groups of four with each team playing each other once in a round-robin format. The two top teams from each group advanced to a knock-out phase. The defending champions from the 2014 World Cup were Germany. They were eliminated in the group phase at the 2018 event, however, finishing bottom of their group behind Sweden, Mexico and South Korea.

France had won the World Cup once before as hosts, beating Brazil in the 1998 final at the Stade de France. They had also finished in second place once before, losing to Italy in the 2006 final via penalties. The team had reached the quarter-final of the previous World Cup, and then finished as runners-up to Portugal as hosts at Euro 2016.

The 2018 final was the first for Croatia in their fifth World Cup appearance. They became the tenth European country and thirteenth overall to reach a World Cup final. Their previous best performance was at the 1998 World Cup, where they reached the semi-final before losing to France. Croatia had been eliminated in the group stage at the 2014 tournament, before reaching the round of 16 at Euro 2016, where they lost to eventual-winners Portugal. The final was the sixth meeting between the two teams, with France undefeated in the previous fixtures with three wins and two draws. Croatia's team at the time was described by many pundits as a golden generation, with Luka Modrić, Ivan Rakitić and Mario Mandžukić as the key players, although with many members of the team having passed the age of thirty, the 2018 World Cup was described as "surely a last quest towards making an impact on the greatest stage" by The Guardian's Shaun Walker. The final was the ninth all-European World Cup final, the most recent having been in 2010 when Spain won 1–0 against the Netherlands.

France and Croatia had played each other twice at major tournaments before. Their first such meeting was the 1998 World Cup semi-final at the Stade de France, where Davor Šuker opened the scoring for Croatia but France came back to win 2–1 courtesy of Lilian Thuram's only two goals for France in his international career. It also featured the only red card of Laurent Blanc's career. The second such meeting was in Group B of UEFA Euro 2004, and the two nations tied 2–2 in Leiria.

The official match ball for the final was the Telstar Mechta (Russian: Мечта; transl. dream or ambition), a red-coloured variant of the Adidas Telstar 18 introduced for the knockout stage. The Telstar family, a homage to the original 1970 Telstar, was designed similarly to 2014's Brazuca, but with longer seams and additional panels.

== Venue ==
The final was played at the Luzhniki Stadium in Moscow, located in the Khamovniki District of the Central Administrative Okrug. An expanded version of the stadium was named as the provisional final venue in Russia's World Cup bid, which was selected by FIFA on 2 December 2010. Luzhniki Stadium was confirmed as the final venue on 14 December 2012, following a meeting of the FIFA Executive Committee held in Tokyo, Japan. The stadium also hosted six other matches, including the opening match on 14 June, three group stage matches, a round of 16 match, and the second semi-final match.

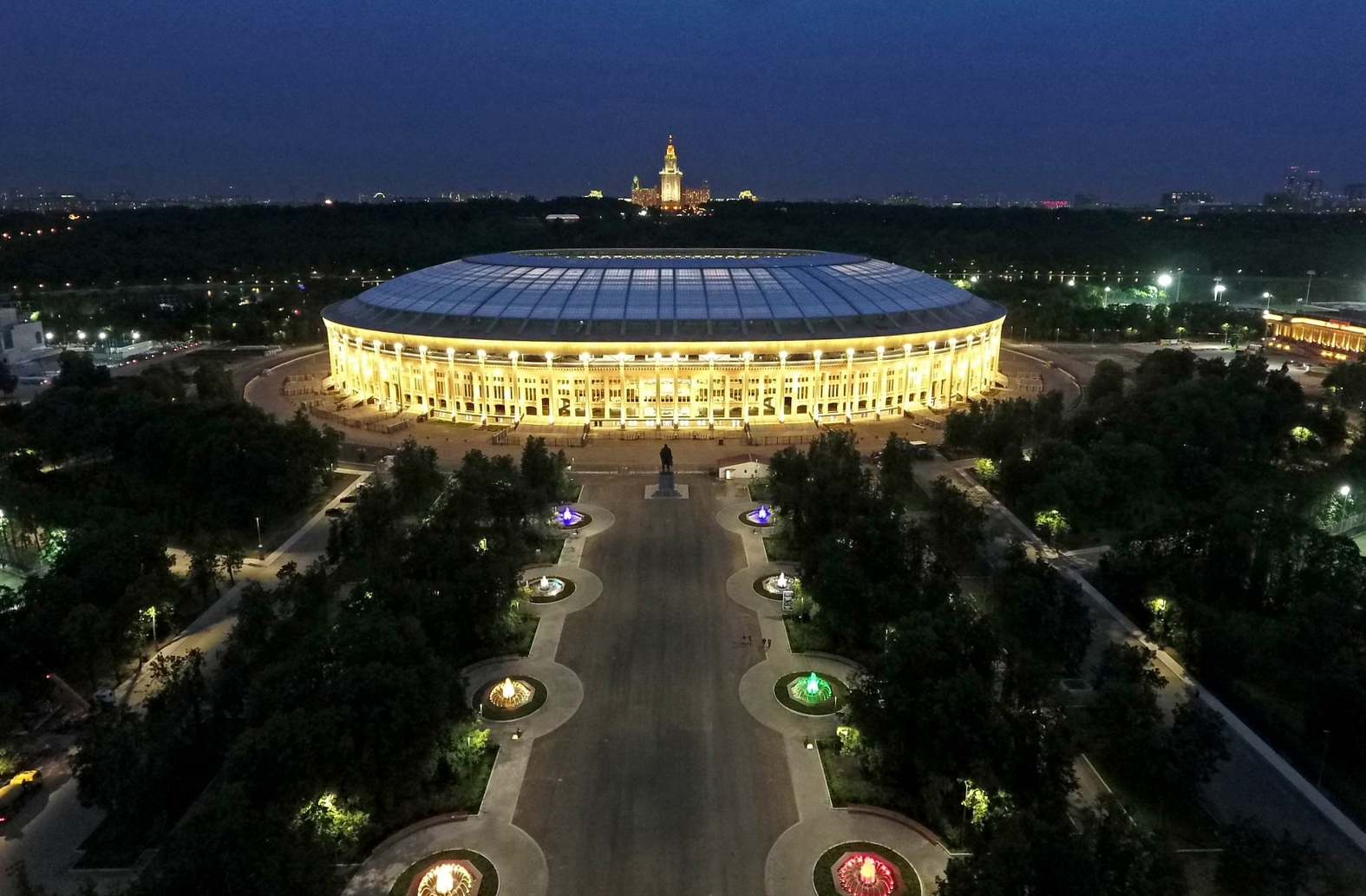
The exterior of the Luzhniki Stadium at night with Moscow State University in the background

The Luzhniki Stadium, previously known as the Grand Arena of the Central Lenin Stadium until 1992, originally opened in 1956 as part of the Luzhniki Olympic Complex to host the USSR Summer Spartakiade. It served as the national stadium of the country, hosting many matches for the Russia national team and its predecessor, the Soviet Union national team. In the past, it was the home ground at various times for CSKA Moscow, Torpedo Moscow, and Spartak Moscow. However, as of 2017, there are currently no clubs based at the stadium.

Rated as a category 4 stadium by UEFA, the Luzhniki Stadium was the largest at the 2018 World Cup; it usually had a maximum capacity of 81,006, but was reduced to 78,011 for the World Cup. This also makes the stadium the largest in Eastern Europe, and among the largest in Europe. To prepare for the World Cup, the stadium was closed for extensive renovations in August 2013. The spectator stands were moved closer to the pitch, which was converted from artificial turf to natural grass, after the removal of the athletic track. The historic facade of the stadium was preserved due to its architectural value, while the roof was upgraded using a new polycarbonate skin with exterior lighting. The Luzhniki did not host any matches at the 2017 FIFA Confederations Cup due to the ongoing project. The renovation project cost €341 million, and the stadium officially reopened with an international friendly between Russia and Argentina on 11 November 2017.

== Route to the final ==
=== France ===
France's route to the final
	Opponent	Result
1	Australia	2–1
2	Peru	1–0
3	Denmark	0–0
R16	Argentina	4–3
QF	Uruguay	2–0
SF	Belgium	1–0

France entered the 2018 World Cup as the bookmakers' favourites to win the tournament, and qualified for the tournament by finishing first in their qualification group, ahead of Sweden and the Netherlands. In the finals, they were drawn in Group C alongside Australia, Denmark, and Peru. Their opening match was against Australia at Kazan Arena in Kazan on 16 June. France won the game 2–1 with Antoine Griezmann scoring the first goal from a penalty called by the video assistant referee. This was followed by a penalty for Australia which was scored by Mile Jedinak, before France scored the winner through an own goal deflected in by Australian defender Aziz Behich. France's second match was against Peru at Central Stadium in Yekaterinburg. France won 1–0 through a goal scored by 19-year-old Kylian Mbappé, who became the country's youngest goalscorer at a major tournament. The victory qualified France for the knockout stage, allowing Didier Deschamps, the French manager, to rest several starting players for the final group stage match against Denmark. That game, which took place at the Luzhniki Stadium, finished in a scoreless draw and was enough for France to win the group.

In the round of 16, France faced Group D runners-up Argentina, on 30 June at Kazan Stadium. In a match dubbed by writers for The Week as "the classic of Kazan", France won 4–3. Griezmann gave France the lead early in the game with a penalty, after Marcos Rojo had fouled Mbappé as he ran with the ball into the penalty area. Argentina then scored on either side of half-time through Ángel Di María and Gabriel Mercado to take the lead. However, in the 57th minute, Benjamin Pavard shot a half-volley from outside the penalty area of 21 yards; to the top-left corner to brought France level again. Pavard's goal was then later voted as the best goal of the tournament. Mbappé then scored twice in four minutes and 40 seconds in the 64th and 68th minute to put them 4–2 up before Sergio Agüero scored a late third for Argentina in stoppage time. Patrick Jennings of BBC Sport described Mbappé's contribution as a "brilliant performance that will linger long in the memory". France's quarter-final was against Uruguay at Nizhny Novgorod Stadium on 6 July. They won 2–0, with goals from Raphaël Varane and Griezmann. The team advanced to a semi-final match against Belgium at the Krestovsky Stadium in Saint Petersburg on 10 July. The game ended in a 1–0 win for the French, the winner headed into the goal by defender Samuel Umtiti following a corner kick.

=== Croatia ===
Croatia's route to the final
	Opponent	Result
1	Nigeria	2–0
2	Argentina	3–0
3	Iceland	2–1
R16	Denmark	1–1 (a.e.t.) (3–2 p)
QF	Russia	2–2 (a.e.t.) (4–3 p)
SF	England	2–1 (a.e.t.)

In their qualification group, Croatia finished second to Iceland and had to enter the qualifying play-offs. There, they faced Greece, whom they beat over a two-legged tie, winning the first leg 4–1 and drawing 0–0 in the second. In the finals, Croatia were drawn into Group D with Argentina, Iceland, and Nigeria, considered a difficult draw due to Argentina's talent and Nigeria's historic performances. In their opening match, the team earned a 2–0 victory over Nigeria, with an own goal by Oghenekaro Etebo caused by Mario Mandžukić and a penalty scored by Luka Modrić. Striker Nikola Kalinić refused to enter the match as a substitute, citing back pain as his reason for not playing, and was expelled from the team by manager Zlatko Dalić, leaving Croatia with only 22 players for the remainder of the tournament. Croatia went on to beat Argentina 3–0, taking the lead in the second half when goalkeeper Willy Caballero's attempted clearance was intercepted by Ante Rebić, and then scoring twice more through Modrić and Ivan Rakitić. Lionel Messi, Argentina's captain, was described by BBC Sport's Jennings as "adrift for much of the match". Croatia finished atop the group with a 2–1 win over Iceland, resting several starting players in the final group match.

In the round of 16, Croatia played Denmark on 1 July at Nizhny Novgorod Stadium. They earned a 1–1 draw after the two teams exchanged goals in the opening five minutes and Modrić missed a penalty in extra time. Croatia won the subsequent penalty shoot-out 3–2, with three saves by goalkeeper Danijel Subašić and two saves by Danish goalkeeper Kasper Schmeichel. The team advanced to a quarter-final at Fisht Olympic Stadium in Sochi against hosts Russia, on 7 July. The Russians scored their first in the 31st minute, but Andrej Kramarić equalised for Croatia eight minutes later and kept the score at 1–1 through the end of regular time. Croatia took a 2–1 lead in the 101st minute with a header by Domagoj Vida, but Russian defender Mário Fernandes equalised five minutes before the end of extra time to trigger a penalty shoot-out. The shoot-out was won 4–3 by Croatia after two misses by Russia and a shot by Modrić that rebounded into the goal off Igor Akinfeev's arm and the post. Croatia became the second team in World Cup to win two shoot-outs in a tournament, after Argentina in 1990. After the match, a video of Vida shouting "Glory to Ukraine" prompted controversy among Russians and a warning from FIFA's disciplinary committee, which enforces a ban on political slogans. Croatia's semi-final match against England, on 11 July at the Luzhniki, began as they conceded a free kick goal by English defender Kieran Trippier in the fifth minute. Croatia resisted several attempts by England to score a second goal in the first half. Croatia managed an equalising goal of their own through a shot by Ivan Perišić in the 68th minute. The match was won 2–1 by Croatia after a 109th-minute goal by Mandžukić. This made Croatia the first team to earn three come-from-behind victories in the FIFA World Cup, all three matches also going into extra time.

== Pre-match ==
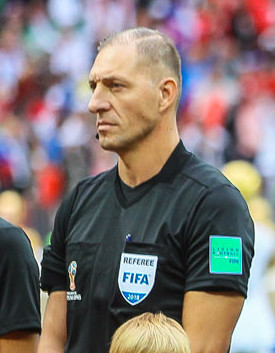
Néstor Pitana officiated the final.

Argentine referee Néstor Pitana was selected to lead the officiating team for the final, which was announced on 12 July 2018 by the FIFA Referees Committee. The final was Pitana's fifth match as referee during the tournament, becoming only the second referee to officiate the opening match and the final. Pitana officiated an additional group stage match, along with two knockout stage matches in the round of 16 and quarter-finals. Pitana had been a FIFA referee since 2010, and officiated four matches at the 2014 World Cup. His compatriots Hernán Maidana and Juan Pablo Belatti were chosen as assistant referees. Björn Kuipers of the Netherlands was chosen as the fourth official, with his fellow countryman Erwin Zeinstra as the reserve assistant. Italian Massimiliano Irrati was named the video assistant referee, presiding over the first use of the technology at a World Cup final. Argentine Mauro Vigliano was chosen as the assistant video assistant referee, while Carlos Astroza of Chile was appointed as the second assistant and Danny Makkelie of the Netherlands as the third assistant.

The tournament's closing ceremony was held prior to the start of the match, featuring a performance of "Live It Up", the official song of the tournament, by Will Smith, Nicky Jam, and Era Istrefi. Jam also performed "X (Equis)", wearing a shirt honouring J Balvin. Opera singer Aida Garifullina sang the Russian folk song "Kalinka", accompanied by a children's choir and percussion section that featured a cameo by former Brazilian international Ronaldinho. There were ten heads of state in attendance, among them Russian president Vladimir Putin, French president Emmanuel Macron, and Croatian president Kolinda Grabar-Kitarović.

The starting line-ups for both teams were identical to those fielded in the semi-finals. Deschamps chose a 4–4–2 formation while his opposite number Dalić opted for a 4–1–4–1 with Mandžukić as the lone striker.

== Match ==
=== First half ===
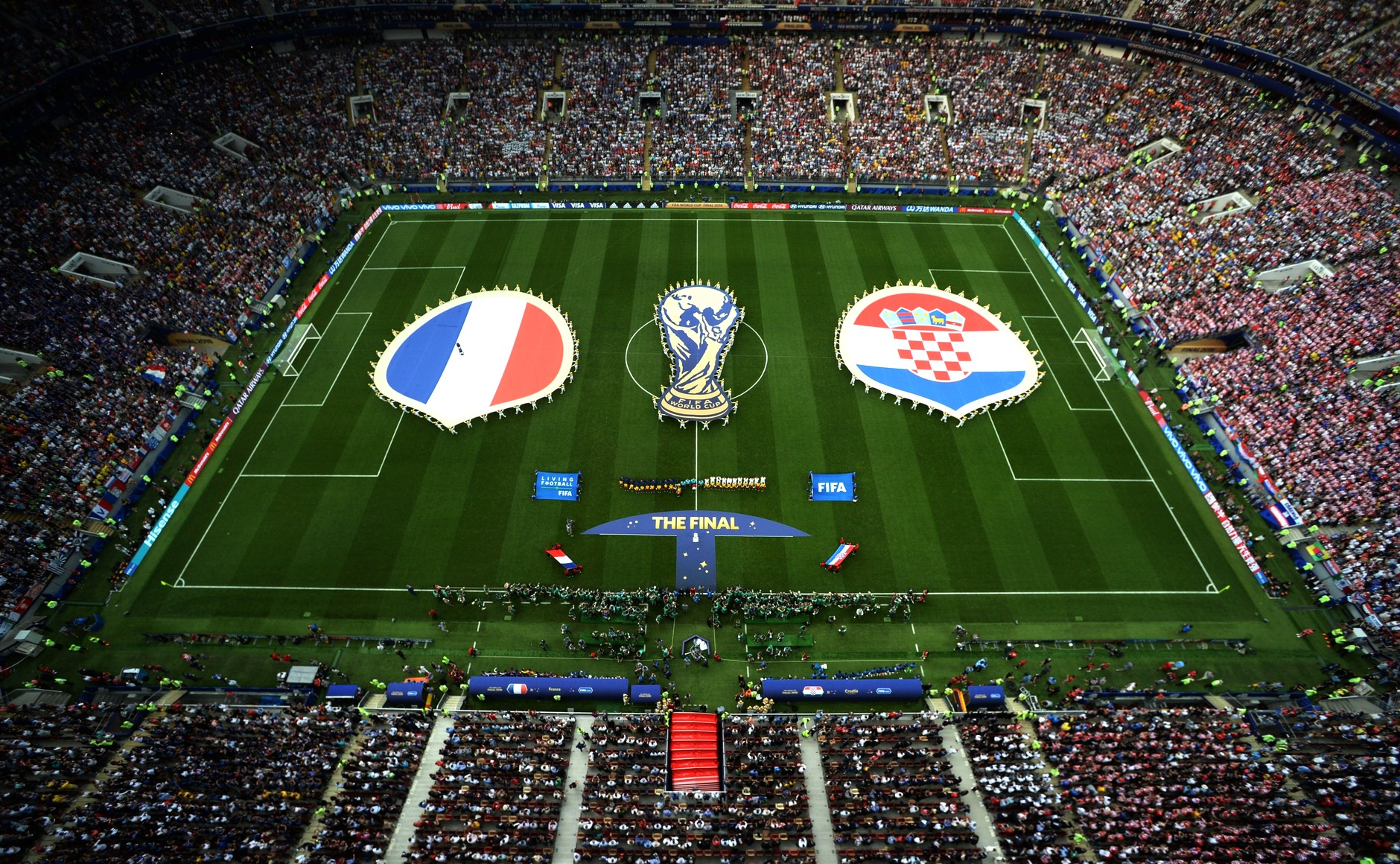
Teams lined up prior to kick-off

Croatia kicked off the match at 18:00 local time (15:00 UTC) in temperatures of 27 °C (81 °F) with 51% humidity, in front of a crowd of 78,011 and an estimated global television audience of 1.12 billion. The weather at Sheremetyevo International Airport, 30 kilometres (19 mi) from the stadium, (Note: Distance measured using Google Maps distance calculator, between Sheremetyevo – A.S. Pushkin international airport, coordinates 55.9736512°N, 37.4103143°E and Luzhniki Stadium, coordinates 55.715765°N, 37.551527°E.) was recorded as partly cloudy at the time of kick-off. The match was played through a minor thunderstorm, which produced several visible lightning strikes. The Guardian's Barry Glendenning wrote that Croatia had the better of the first 15 minutes, noting that France were "struggling to get out of their own half" and that Croatia were "bossing them completely." However, France took the lead in the 18th minute. They won a free kick around 30 yards (27 m) from goal when Marcelo Brozović fouled Griezmann, which Griezmann took himself. He crossed the free kick into the penalty area, where it reached Mandžukić. He attempted to head clear, but the ball instead went past goalkeeper Subašić for an own goal, the first ever own goal in a World Cup final. N'Golo Kanté received the game's first yellow card in the 28th minute for a foul on Perišić. Croatia equalised a minute later, when Perišić was fouled 40 yards (37 m) from goal and Modrić's free kick towards the far goalpost was headed back across goal by Šime Vrsaljko and collected by Perišić, who hit a low shot into the corner of the goal.

Five minutes after Croatia's goal, Griezmann took a corner into the penalty area. Blaise Matuidi's attempt to score with a header was not successful, but France players appealed for a penalty, claiming that Perišić had handled the ball while marking Matuidi. The video assistant referee alerted Pitana and after he reviewed the incident for several minutes, he gave a penalty to France. The penalty was taken by Griezmann in the 38th minute, and he scored with a low kick into the left-hand corner. In the 43rd minute, Lucas Hernandez was booked for a foul on Rebić and then Perišić had a shot on goal which was deflected for a corner by Paul Pogba. Shortly before half-time, Croatia had a corner which was taken by Rakitić into the penalty area, where Vida had an opportunity to score with his head, but the ball went wide of the goal. The first half finished with France leading 2–1, despite having only one shot on goal and 34% of the possession. During the half-time break, pundits discussed the legitimacy of both France's goals, with Alan Shearer and Rio Ferdinand on BBC One saying that neither the free kick which led to their first goal, nor the penalty for the second, should have been awarded. Shearer labelled the penalty decision "ridiculous", saying that in his opinion there was "no way that the hand-ball was deliberate". Chris Waddle, speaking on BBC Radio 5 Live thought the penalty decision was correct, however, saying "I would have given it. Perišić has stopped the ball going through with his hand." Gabriele Marcotti of ESPN described it as "the sort of decision that, even after replay, could have gone either way".

=== Second half ===
Antoine Griezmann was named the man of the match after scoring one goal and assisting another.

A Croatian attack was stopped early in the second half after several pitch invaders ran onto the field before being removed by security officers; Russian feminist rock band and protest group Pussy Riot claimed responsibility for the interruption. Three minutes into the second half, Croatia had an opportunity to score when Rebić struck the ball towards goal from the left side of the penalty area following a pass by Rakitić. French goalkeeper Hugo Lloris made a one-handed save from his shot, sending the ball behind for a corner. Glendenning said that Croatia had begun the second half as they began the first, "in a state of total dominance". France had an opportunity in the 52nd minute, when Mbappé received the ball from Pogba and ran down the left-hand side. He ran past Vida and shot towards goal, but Subašić was able to claim the ball. France made a substitution in the 55th minute when Steven Nzonzi replaced Kanté. They then increased their lead in the 59th minute, when Pogba found Mbappé again, on the right wing, with a pass from his own half. Mbappé passed to Griezmann, who then sent the ball back to Pogba who was outside the penalty area. Pogba took a shot at goal which rebounded back to him off a defender, before he sent a second shot into the Croatian goal with Subašić unable to reach it.

France had a chance to extend their lead in the 63rd minute when Olivier Giroud hit the ball with a bicycle kick towards Griezmann, who was not marked in front of goal, but Brozović was able to gain possession before the ball reached Griezmann. Two minutes later, they did score again when Mbappé hit a shot from 25 yards (23 m) which went past Vida and Subašić, low into the Croatian goal. Mbappé became only the second teenager to score in a World Cup final, the first being Pelé when he scored twice in 1958. Croatia scored their second goal in the 69th minute from a back-pass that Lloris failed to dribble away from Mandžukić, who poked the loose ball into the unguarded net with his right leg. Despite late pressure by Croatia, the match finished as a 4–2 victory for France, the highest-scoring World Cup final since 1966 and the first World Cup final since 2002 to be decided without extra time.

=== Details ===
15 July 2018
18:00 MSK (UTC+3)

France	4–2	Croatia
Mandžukić 18' (o.g.); Griezmann 38' (pen.); Pogba 59'; Mbappé 65'		Perišić 28'; Mandžukić 69'

Luzhniki Stadium, Moscow
Attendance: 78,011
Referee: Néstor Pitana (Argentina)

France	Croatia

GK	1	Hugo Lloris (c)
RB	2	Benjamin Pavard
CB	4	Raphaël Varane
CB	5	Samuel Umtiti
LB	21	Lucas Hernandez	(yellow card) 41'
CM	6	Paul Pogba
CM	13	N'Golo Kanté	(yellow card) 27'	(substituted off) 55'
RW	10	Kylian Mbappé
AM	7	Antoine Griezmann
LW	14	Blaise Matuidi		(substituted off) 73'
CF	9	Olivier Giroud		(substituted off) 81'
Substitutions:
MF	15	Steven Nzonzi		(substituted on) 55'
MF	12	Corentin Tolisso		(substituted on) 73'
FW	18	Nabil Fekir		(substituted on) 81'
Manager:
Didier Deschamps

GK	23	Danijel Subašić
RB	2	Šime Vrsaljko	(yellow card) 90+2'
CB	6	Dejan Lovren
CB	21	Domagoj Vida
LB	3	Ivan Strinić		(substituted off) 81'
CM	7	Ivan Rakitić
CM	11	Marcelo Brozović
RW	18	Ante Rebić		(substituted off) 71'
AM	10	Luka Modrić (c)
LW	4	Ivan Perišić
CF	17	Mario Mandžukić
Substitutions:
FW	9	Andrej Kramarić		(substituted on) 71'
FW	20	Marko Pjaca		(substituted on) 81'
Manager:
Zlatko Dalić

Man of the Match:
Antoine Griezmann (France)

Assistant referees:
Hernán Maidana (Argentina)
Juan Pablo Belatti (Argentina)
Fourth official:
Björn Kuipers (Netherlands)
Reserve assistant referee:
Erwin Zeinstra (Netherlands)
Video assistant referee:
Massimiliano Irrati (Italy)
Assistant video assistant referees:
Mauro Vigliano (Argentina)
Carlos Astroza (Chile)
Danny Makkelie (Netherlands)

Match rules

- 90 minutes
- 30 minutes of extra time if necessary
- Penalty shoot-out if scores still level
- Maximum of twelve named substitutes
- Maximum of three substitutions, with a fourth allowed in extra time

=== Statistics ===
First half
Statistic	France	Croatia
Goals scored	2	1
Total shots	1	7
Shots on target	1	1
Saves	0	0
Ball possession	39%	61%
Corner kicks	1	4
Fouls committed	8	7
Offsides	1	0
Yellow cards	2	0
Red cards	0	0

Second half
Statistic	France	Croatia
Goals scored	2	1
Total shots	7	8
Shots on target	5	2
Saves	1	3
Ball possession	39%	61%
Corner kicks	1	2
Fouls committed	6	6
Offsides	0	1
Yellow cards	0	1
Red cards	0	0

Overall
Statistic	France	Croatia
Goals scored	4	2
Total shots	8	15
Shots on target	6	3
Saves	1	3
Ball possession	39%	61%
Corner kicks	2	6
Fouls committed	14	13
Offsides	1	1
Yellow cards	2	1
Red cards	0	0

== Post-match ==
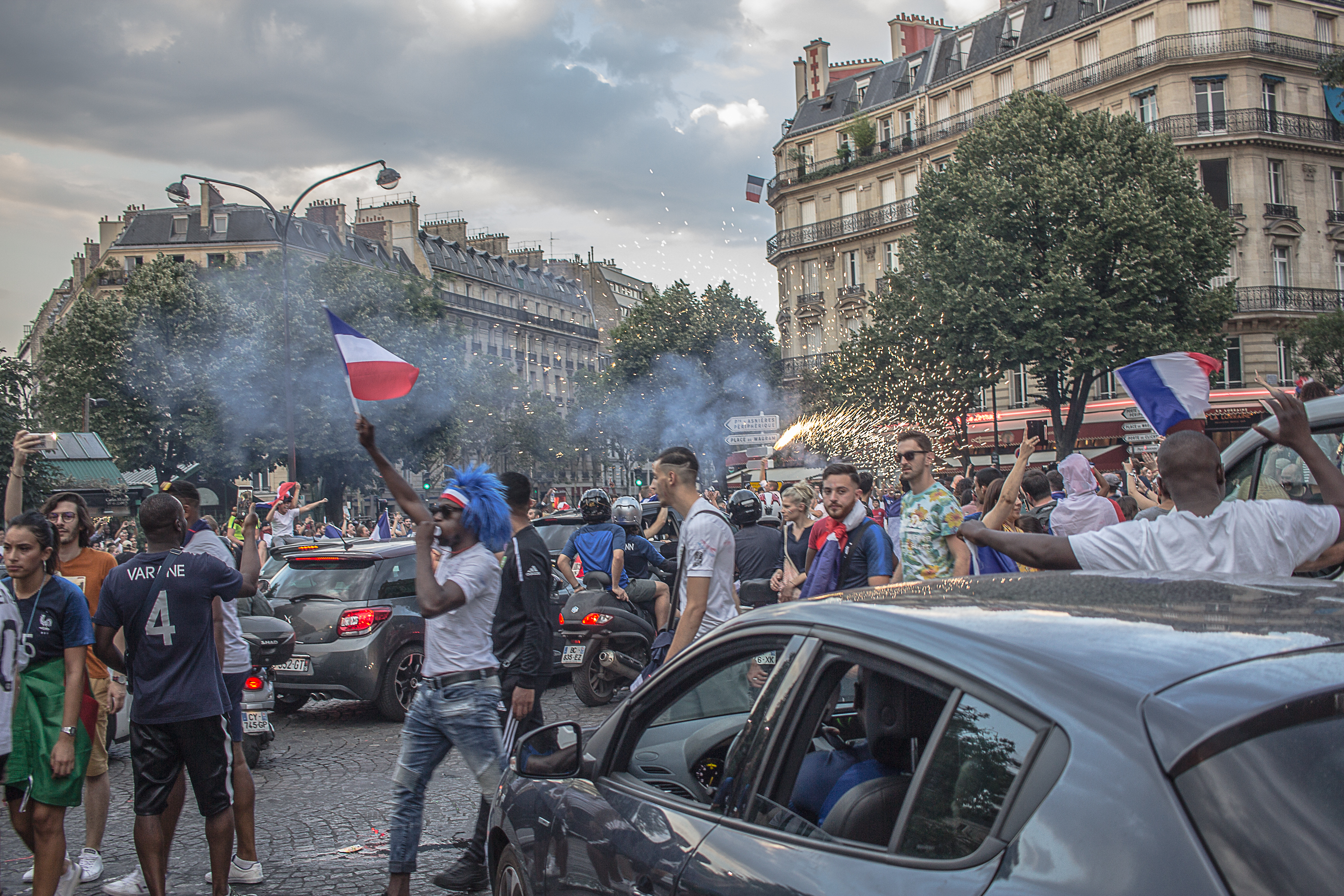
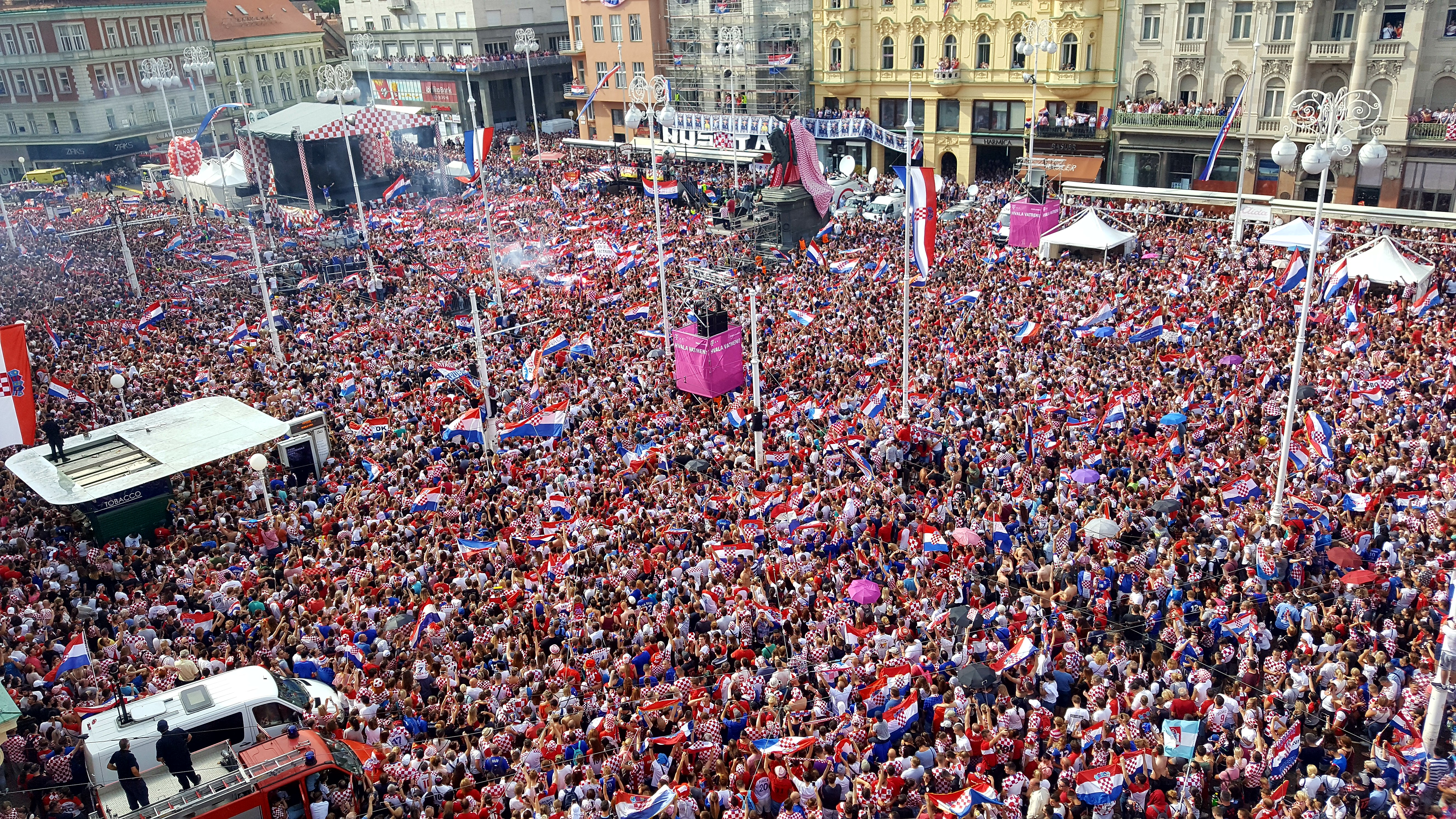
Fan celebrations on the streets of Paris, France (top) and at Ban Jelačić Square in Zagreb, Croatia (bottom)

France became the sixth country to win the World Cup more than once with their win. Deschamps became the third person to have won the World Cup as both a player and manager, after Mário Zagallo and Franz Beckenbauer. The final was the highest scoring since 1966, and the highest score in regular time since 1958. The medals were presented on the pitch to both teams by presidents Putin, Macron, and Grabar-Kitarović amid a heavy rainstorm. FIFA president Gianni Infantino handed the trophy to French captain Lloris, and as he raised the trophy, a short version of the tournament's official song "Live It Up" was played.

Croatian captain Modrić won the Golden Ball as best player of the tournament. Griezmann, the final's man of the match, also won the Bronze Ball and the Silver Boot award with four goals and two assists. Kylian Mbappé won the Best Young Player award for the tournament.

After the match, Deschamps reflected on his own experience as captain of the victorious 1998 team, saying "that adventure is linked to these players' adventure. I had the immense privilege to live through this 20 years ago, and in France, but what the players have just done is just as beautiful, just as powerful. I have a son who is 22 now. When we were champions, he was too young to understand. His generation now have this happiness to live through." Griezmann commented: "I do not know where I am! I am really happy. It was a very difficult match, Croatia had a great game. We came back and we managed to make the difference. We cannot wait to lift the Cup and bring it back to France." Dalić was magnanimous, saying "first of all I want to congratulate France", while also expressing sadness and pride in his team's achievement. He was critical of the penalty decision, saying "I just want to say one sentence about that penalty: You don't give a penalty like that in a World Cup final". Modrić was also proud, both of his own achievement in winning the Golden Ball, and in the team. He said "you know that, despite the defeat, you've achieved something big".

Large crowds, including 90,000 people at the Eiffel Tower fanzone and an estimated million on the Champs-Élysées, celebrated the victory in Paris. The celebrations were marred by instances of rioting that were broken up by police, as well as the deaths of at least two people during celebrations elsewhere in the country, one man died after diving into a shallow canal and another died after crashing his car into a tree, RATP, the operator of the Paris Métro system, temporarily renamed several stations in honour of the team and its World Cup victory.

On 16 July, more than 550,000 fans welcomed the Croatian team home in the capital city of Zagreb, where a six-hour-long bus tour brought them from Zagreb Airport to Ban Jelačić Square. In the following days, players were all welcomed individually in their hometowns as well.

== Broadcasting and viewership ==
FIFA estimated that the global audience for the final peaked at 1.12 billion people, including 884 million watching television broadcasts and 232 million using other platforms, including online streaming, and at public venues. According to a broadcast audit report, 86.7 percent of televisions turned on in France and 88.6 in Croatia were watching the broadcast.

=== Europe ===
In France, the final was televised on TF1 and BeIN Sports and drew an average of 26.1 million viewers, making it the most watched event ever in French television history. In Croatia, the match drew around 1.538 million viewers – more than 38% of the population – on national broadcaster HRT 2 for an 89.3% market share. In the United Kingdom, the final had an average viewership of 10.5 million and a peak viewership of 13.8 million, split between free-to-air broadcasters BBC One and ITV, almost half that of the viewership of England–Croatia semi-final. In Germany, the match drew a viewership of 21.3 million, which was around 76% of the market share, on public-service broadcaster ZDF. In Spain, the match had a 57.3% share, with 8.2 million viewers on Mediaset España Comunicación's Telecinco. In Italy, it drew 11.7 million viewers on Canale 5. In the Netherlands, the match had a viewership of 3.1 million on NPO1. In the host nation of Russia, the final was the third-most watched match of the 2018 World Cup and accounted for around 50% of the nation's population.

In total, the final drew more than 160 million viewers in 20 European territories, including Russia, the United Kingdom and Germany.

=== Rest of the world ===
In the United States, the match was broadcast in English on Fox and in Spanish on Telemundo; the broadcasts averaged 16.6 million viewers combined, with Telemundo reaching a total of 57% of the country's Latino population. In India, 70 million viewers streamed the match online, through Sony Picture Networks India's (SPN) Sony Liv application, which was a record for a football match; an additional 22.4 million viewers watched the match on Sony Ten 2, Sony Ten 3 and Sony ESPN. In China, the match drew a combined of 56 million viewers on state-broadcasters CCTV-1 and CCTV-5, the most-watched sporting event in China since 2008 Beijing Olympics; an additional 24 million viewers streamed the match through Youku, a video-service and an Alibaba Group subsidiary. In Australia, the final was watched by an average of 2.2 million viewers – with a peak of 3.4 million viewers – on national public broadcaster SBS. Whereas, in Canada, the final was watched by an average of 3.9 million viewers, with a peak of 5.4 million viewers on CTV, TSN and RDS.

== See also ==
- Croatia at the FIFA World Cup
- France at the FIFA World Cup
