= Ultra Records =

American record label

The Ultra Records
- Type: Record label; publishing; artist management
- Industry: Music
- Founded: 1995; 31 years ago; New York City, New York, U.S.
- Founder: Patrick Moxey
- Key people: David Waxman (president)
- Parent: Sony Music Entertainment (2012–present)
- Website: Official website

Ultra Records is an American record label owned by Sony Music Entertainment, which is a subsidiary of Sony Music Group.

== Company history ==
Established in 1995 in New York City by Patrick Moxey, a former executive of PolyGram and Virgin Records, Ultra Records is home to various electronic music artists such as Armin van Buuren, David Guetta, Calvin Harris, deadmau5, and Tiësto.

In 1999, Ultra Records commenced litigation with the upstart Ultra Music Festival. Ultra Records demanded that Ultra Music Festival limit its use of the name Ultra to Florida. In 2012, after Ultra Records adopted a new logo and started using the name Ultra Music, the dispute resulted in a two-week jury trial in federal court in the Southern District of New York between Ultra Records and Ultra Music Festival (known formally as Ultra Enterprises, Inc.) that was resolved by an out of court settlement.

In 2013, Ultra entered a global partnership with Sony Music. In December 2021, Sony Music fully acquired Ultra Records from Patrick Moxey.

In January 2022, David Waxman, previously head of A&R and general manager, was appointed president of Ultra Records.

== Awards ==
Ultra Music has received Grammys for Benny Benassi's remix of Public Enemy's "Bring The Noise" (2008) and Skrillex's remix of Benny Benassi's "Cinema" (2012), and nominations in 2017 for Best Dance Recording with Sofi Tukker's "Drinkee," Best Dance Electronic Album with Jean-Michel Jarre's "Electronic 1: The Time Machine", and Best Music Film with Steve Aoki's "I'll Sleep When I'm Dead". Ultra Music has also received the Best American Music Label award from International Dance Music Awards' Best American Music Label 10 times.

== Certifications ==
By 2017, Ultra Records (then Ultra Music) had received Diamond, Platinum, and Gold records worldwide.

- OMI's "Cheerleader" (Felix Jaehn Remix) has received 1× Diamond, 20× Platinum, and 7× Gold certifications globally.
- Steve Aoki and Louis Tomlinson, a member of One Direction, released their collaboration "Just Hold On," which went Gold and Silver in 6 countries in four months.
- "Don't Be So Shy (Filatov & Karas Remix)" by French singer and model Imany went 2× Platinum.
- Producer and DJ Deorro's Latin crossover ballad "Bailar", featuring Grammy Award-winning Merengue singer Elvis Crespo went multi-Platinum and Gold.
- Deorro's collaboration with Chris Brown "Five More Hours" earned 19× Platinum and 4× Gold certifications.
- "Paradise," a collaboration between Benny Benassi and Chris Brown went certified Gold in 2016.
- Jesper Jenset's singles released on the label in partnership with Sony Music Norway "High" and "Painkiller" have become 2× Platinum and Gold in Norway, respectively.
- Lost Frequencies' "Are You with Me" with multi-Platinum and Gold certifications across 14 countries.
- Pop singer Era Istrefi's track "BonBon" went Gold in 4 countries.
- SNBRN's "Gangsta Walk" went 2× Platinum.
- French producer Klingande went Platinum with his song "Somewhere New".
- Grammy-nominated duo Sofi Tukker went certified Gold with their record "Drinkee".

== Partnerships ==
- Ultra Records has produced Steve Aoki's I'll Sleep When I'm Dead (2016) documentary, as well as Kygo and Deorro's forthcoming concert documentaries.
- Ultra Music Festival and Ultra Records collaborate on international electronic music festivals.

== See also ==
- List of Sony Music labels
