= BonBon =

2015 single by Era Istrefi

Single by Era Istrefi

from the EP BonBon
- Language: Albanian
- Released: 30 December 2015
- Genre: Dance-pop; dancehall; EDM; R&B
- Length: 2:55
- Label: Nesër; B1; Ultra
- Songwriters: Era Istrefi; Ergen Berisha
- Producers: Big Bang; Cricket; Toton

Era Istrefi singles chronology
"Shumë Pis" (2015)	"BonBon" (2015)	"Redrum" (2017)

Music video
- "BonBon" on YouTube

"BonBon" (Albanian pronunciation: [bɔn bɔn]) is a song by Kosovo-Albanian singer Era Istrefi. It was released on 30 December 2015 through Nesër, B1, and Ultra Music. A dance-pop, dancehall, EDM and R&B song, its Albanian-language lyrics imply a message of empowerment and self-love. "BonBon" was written by Istrefi and Ergen Berisha, and produced by Big Bang, Cricket and Toton. The song received widespread acclaim from music critics, who complimented the song's production, lyrics, and Istrefi's vocal performance, comparing her positively to Rihanna or Sia. The song became Istrefi's international breakthrough single; it topped the charts in Albania and reached the top ten on music charts in four other countries. It was awarded gold certifications in various countries alongside a platinum certification in France by the Syndicat National de l'Édition Phonographique (SNEP).

An accompanying music video was uploaded to Nesër's YouTube channel on 30 December 2015, before it was transferred to the channel of Ultra Music on 7 March 2016. Filmed in the mountainous region of Brezovicë, Kosovo, the video depicts Istrefi walking and dancing on a snow-covered road and surroundings. The singer performed the song on several occasions worldwide throughout 2016, including in Albania, Germany, France and Romania. An English version of "BonBon", along with remix versions featuring American singer Post Malone and DJs Marshmello and Luca Schreiner were released as part of an EP of the same name in 2016.

== Background and composition ==
Born into an Albanian musical family, Istrefi began pursuing a professional music career in 2013 and rose to widespread attention in the Albanian-speaking territories at a relatively early stage. She made her international breakthrough in early 2016, after the release of BonBon", which secured her a recording contract with Ultra Music. With a length of two minutes and 47 seconds, Nesër released it as a single for digital download and streaming in the United States on 30 December 2015. It was written by Istrefi and Ergen Berisha, with the production handled by Big Bang, Cricket and Toton. Johnny Horesco and Miles Walker mastered and mixed the song, respectively. Musically, "BonBon" is as a dance-pop, EDM, R&B and dancehall-leaning song. During the song's Albanian-language and occasional English lyrics, Istrefi implies an empowerment message, singing about self-love and how she does not need anyone to make her feel happy.

== Reception ==
Upon its release, "BonBon" was met with widespread acclaim from music critics. Many critics praised Istrefi's appearance and vocal delivery, positively comparing it to that of Barbadian singer Rihanna and Australian singer Sia. David Rishty from Billboard also responded positively towards the song and linked her aesthetic to that of American disc jockey-trio Major Lazer. Ultra Music's executive Patrick complimented the song for its "oriental" appeal and found the lyrical alternation between Albanian and English as "seamless" and "special". Tanja Hill of The Source wrote that Istrefi portrays a "smooth" and "sexy" sound with an "irresistible" beat. The staff of BigFM expected a chart success in Germany and wrote that "BonBon", including its "smooth, sexy-smoky-sounding tones" fusing pop, reggae and dubstep, was destined for a chill evening. Fans of "BonBon" included Bebe Rexha, Imany, Jelena Karleuša, Jesse Saint John, Katy Perry, Kim Kardashian and P. Diddy. "BonBon" won the Song of the Year at the 2016 Top Music Awards in Tirana, Albania. Istrefi also was awarded the 2017 European Border Breakers Award for the single's achievements and success.

"BonBon" experienced widespread success on record charts, reaching top 10 positions were achieved in the Commonwealth of Independent States (CIS), Germany, Greece, Lebanon, Romania, Russia and Sweden. "BonBon" further reached the top 50 in Australia, Austria, Belgium, Denmark, France, Switzerland and Ukraine. Due to high sales, "BonBon" was awarded gold certifications in Australia, Canada, Denmark, Germany, Italy and the Netherlands. In February 2017, the single also received a platinum certification by the Syndicat National de l'Édition Phonographique (SNEP) in France for shifting more than 133,333 units.

== Promotion and other usage ==
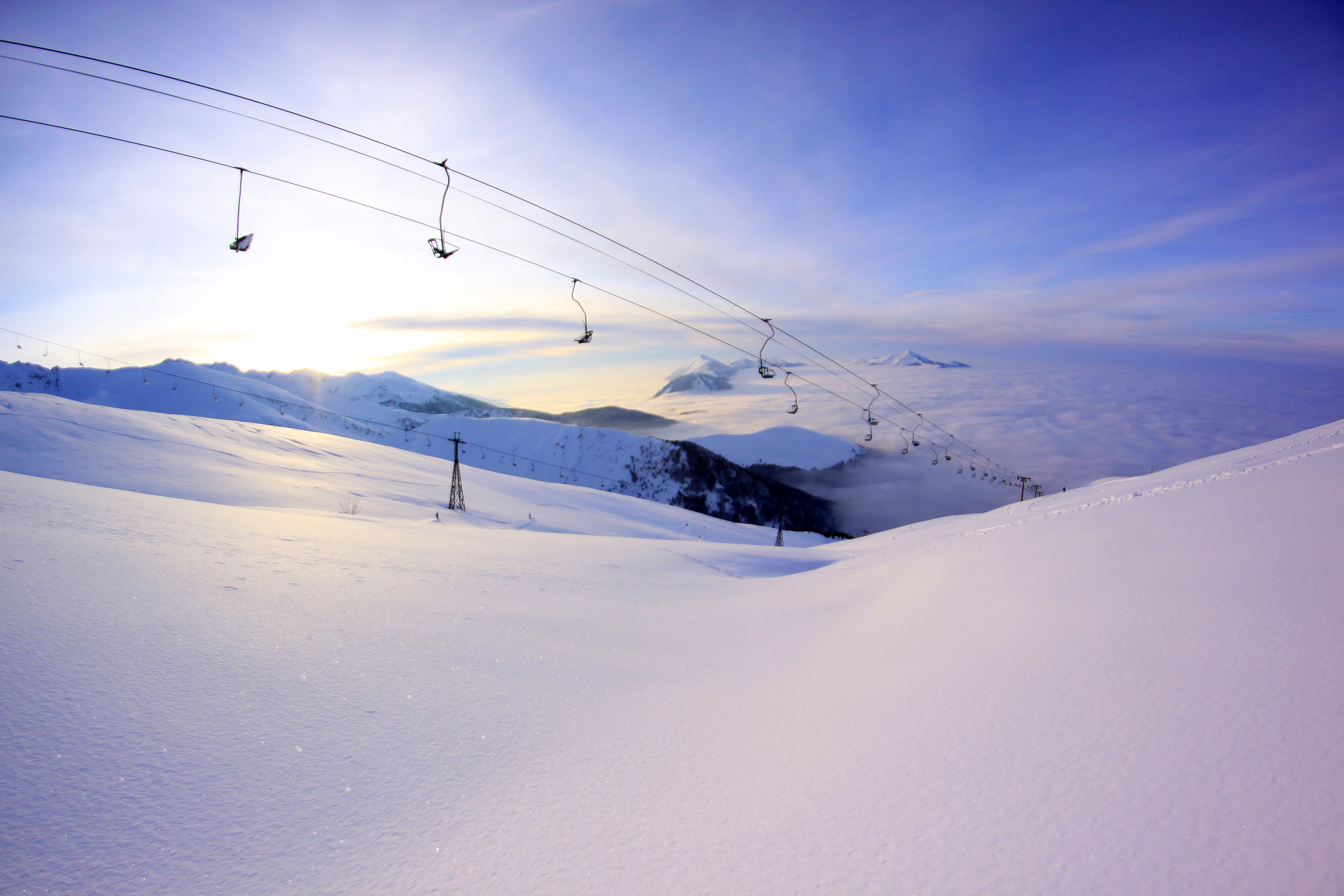
The music video for "BonBon" was shot in Brezovicë, Kosovo.

Upon her international breakthrough, Istrefi performed "BonBon" in various countries. In 2016, the singer provided live performances at the Top Music Awards and Skopje Calling Festival in June, as well as at the NRJ Music Tour in Roubaix in July and the Coca-Cola Happy Energy Tour in Sofia in September. She later performed the song at the Untold Festival in Cluj-Napoca in August 2017. In May 2016, she further went on to perform "BonBon" on German game show Schlag den Star and French television programme Mad Mag. The single was further featured on an episode of American series Dynasty in 2016 and in the dance video game Just Dance 2017. Greek actress Konnie Metaxa and Romanian singer Adina Răducan impersonated Istrefi and provided performances of the recording for the Greek and Romanian versions of the reality talent show of Your Face Sounds Familiar, respectively.

== Music video ==
An accompanying music video for "BonBon" was initially uploaded to Nesër's official YouTube channel on 30 December 2015. After she was signed to the label, the video was transferred on 7 March 2016 to the channel of American record label Ultra Music on the aforementioned platform. The three-minute long video was filmed in the mountainous region of Brezovicë, Kosovo. It features scenes of Istrefi walking across a snow-covered road dressed in a green parka-jacket with bright pink fur.

== Credits and personnel ==
Credits adapted from Tidal.

- Era Istrefi – composing, songwriting, vocals
- Big Bang – producing
- Cricket – songwriting
- Ergen Berisha – songwriting
- Johnny Horesco – mastering
- Miles Walker – mixing
- Toton – songwriting

== Track listing ==
- Digital download
1. "BonBon" – 2:47
- Digital download – EP
1. "BonBon" – 2:47
2. "BonBon" (English Version) – 2:47
3. "BonBon" (Post Malone Remix) – 3:22
4. "BonBon" (Marshmello Remix) – 3:03
5. "BonBon" (Luca Schreiner Remix) – 5:35

== Charts ==
=== Weekly charts ===
Weekly chart performance for "BonBon"
Chart (2016)	Peak position
Australia (ARIA)	46
Austria (Ö3 Austria Top 40)	19
Belgium (Ultratip Bubbling Under Flanders)	26
Belgium (Ultratop 50 Wallonia)	39
Canada Hot 100 (Billboard)	95
CIS Airplay (TopHit)	10
Czech Republic Singles Digital (ČNS IFPI)	91
Denmark (Tracklisten)	38
France (SNEP)	29
Germany (GfK)	10
Germany (Airplay Chart)	11
Greece Digital (Billboard)	3
Italy (FIMI)	79
Lebanon Airplay (Lebanese Top 20)	7
Netherlands (Single Top 100)	62
Romania (Airplay 100)	2
Romania TV Airplay (Media Forest)	5
Russia Airplay (TopHit)	8
Sweden Heatseeker (Sverigetopplistan)	2
Switzerland (Schweizer Hitparade)	39
Ukraine Airplay (TopHit)	44
US Hot Dance/Electronic Songs (Billboard)	13

2025 Weekly chart performance for "BonBon"
Chart (2025)	Peak position
Moldova Airplay (TopHit)	90

=== Monthly charts ===
Monthly chart performance for "BonBon"
Chart (2016)	Peak position
CIS Airplay (TopHit)	9
Russia Airplay (TopHit)	9
Ukraine Airplay (TopHit)	47

=== Year-end charts ===
Year-end chart performance for "BonBon"
Chart (2016)	Position
Austria (Ö3 Austria Top 40)	70
Bulgaria (PROPHON)	8
CIS Airplay (TopHit)	51
France (SNEP)	90
Germany (Official German Charts)	57
Russia Airplay (TopHit)	49
Switzerland (Schweizer Hitparade)	95
Ukraine Airplay (TopHit)	138
US Hot Dance/Electronic Songs (Billboard)	42

== Certifications ==
Certifications and sales for "BonBon"
Region	Certification	Certified units/sales
Australia (ARIA)	Gold	35,000^{‡}
Canada (Music Canada)	Gold	40,000^{‡}
Denmark (IFPI Danmark)	Gold	45,000^{‡}
France (SNEP)	Platinum	133,333^{‡}
Germany (BVMI)	Platinum	400,000^{‡}
Italy (FIMI)	Gold	25,000^{‡}
Netherlands (NVPI)	Gold	15,000^{‡}
Sweden (GLF)	Gold	20,000^{‡}
^{‡} Sales+streaming figures based on certification alone.

== Release history ==
Release dates and formats for "BonBon"
Region	Date	Format(s)	Label	Ref.
United States	30 December 2015	Digital download; streaming	Nesër	
CIS	30 March 2016	Radio airplay	Sony	
Italy	8 April 2016	Radio airplay	Sony	
Various	21 July 2016	Digital download; streaming	B1; Nesër; Ultra	
