= Nora Istrefi =

Kosovo-Albanian singer (born 1986)

- Born: 25 March 1986 (age 40); Pristina, SFR Yugoslavia (now Kosovo)
- Other name: Nora
- Occupation: Singer
- Years active: 2005–present
- Spouse: Robert Berisha (m. 2014; div. 2019)
- Children: 1
- Parents: Nezir Istrefi (father); Suzana Tahirsylaj (mother)
- Relatives: Era Istrefi (sister)

Nora Istrefi (born 25 March 1986) is a Kosovo-Albanian singer.

== Life and career ==
=== 1986–2004: Early life and career beginnings ===
Istrefi was born on 25 March 1986 to Nezir Istrefi and Suzana Tahirsylaj in the city of Pristina, then part of the Socialist Federal Republic of Yugoslavia, present Kosovo. Istrefi started her professional career at the age of 18.

=== 2005–present: Engjëll and continued success ===
She released her first album Engjëll (Angel) in 2005, with songs including "Taxi", which brought her a degree of popularity. During the four coming years she released three albums, Opium in 2006, Another World in 2008 and her self-titled album Nora in 2009. After 2009, she released a number of songs, including "Le Mama" with Gena, "Big Love", "Ski me ikë". Istrefi is the daughter of Suzana Tahirsylaj, a popular Kosovo-Albanian singer in the 1980s and '90s. Her younger sister Era Istrefi is also a singer. She is in a relationship with Robert Berisha. They were engaged on 22 May 2008 in Pristina. On 2 September 2014, the couple married in Pristina. They have a girl named Renè.

== Awards and nominations ==
Kenga Magjike

Year	Nominee / work	Award	Result
2013	"I Jemi Je"	Discography Award	Won

Top Music Awards

Year	Nominee / work	Award	Result
2016	"Herself"	Female Artist of the Year	Nominated
