= Era Istrefi =

Kosovar singer (born 1994)

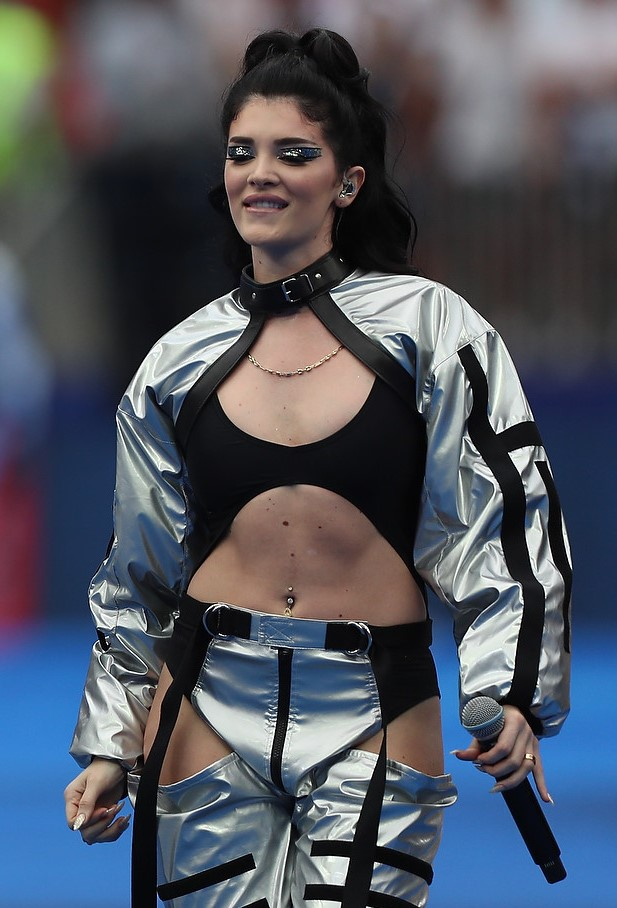
- Istrefi performing at the 2018 FIFA World Cup Final
- Born: 4 July 1994 (age 32); Pristina, AP Kosovo, FR Yugoslavia (present-day Kosovo)
- Citizenship: Kosovo; Albania
- Occupations: Singer; songwriter
- Years active: 2013–present
- Works: Discography
- Relatives: Nora Istrefi (sister)
- Musical career
- Genres: Dancehall; EDM; pop; R&B; trap
- Instruments: Vocals
- Labels: AVD; Nesër; B1; Sony; Ultra; RCA; 360

Era Istrefi (/ˈɛrɑː ɪˈstrɛfi/; Albanian: [ˈɛɾa isˈtɾɛfi]; born 4 July 1994) is a Kosovar and Albanian singer. Born and raised in Pristina, she rose to international recognition in 2016 with the breakthrough single "BonBon", which experienced commercial success worldwide. She signed to American record labels Sony, RCA, and Ultra Music in 2016, going on to release several singles including the Albanian number-one song "Redrum" featuring Australian producer Felix Snow. In 2018, Istrefi was featured on the official song for the 2018 FIFA World Cup, alongside Nicky Jam and Will Smith.

Istrefi's discography includes works in Albanian and English, and she has received a number of awards and accolades. These include a European Border Breakers Award, and multiple Top Music Awards.

== Life and career ==
=== 1994–2014: Early life and success in the Albanian-speaking world ===
Era Istrefi was born on 4 July 1994 into an Albanian family in the city of Pristina, then part of the FR Yugoslavia, present-day Kosovo. Her father Nezir Istrefi, a journalist, died in 2004. Istrefi's mother, Suzana Istrefi (née Tahirsylaj), a musician active between the 1980s and 1990s, took a break from her career upon her husband's death. Her sister Nora Istrefi is also a singer, while her other sister Nita is a stylist.

In 2013, Istrefi made her debut with the single "Mani Për Money", which was followed by her second single "A Po Don" alongside an accompanying music video; it similarly achieved domestic recognition. Her third single "E Dehun" was filmed in the Church of Christ the Saviour, a desecrated Serbian Orthodox church in Kosovo. Istrefi received criticism from the Serbian Orthodox Church after the release of the music video for the song. The video depicted a semi-nude woman dancing around the Church of Christ the Saviour, and the Serbian Orthodox Church called her actions "demonic" and "blasphemous". The video's director Astrit Ismaili responded by stating that they did not intend to offend Serbians and that he had the permission to shoot the video at the church entrance. Upon its release, "E Dehun" yielded Istrefi three Videofest Awards, including one for "Best New Artist".

In December 2014, Istrefi released the pop ballad "13", which was produced in the United States. Its accompanying music video was viewed almost 200,000 times within 24 hours on YouTube, which later resulted in it being featured in V Magazine.

=== 2015–present: International breakthrough, singles ===
Istrefi released three singles in 2015, including "Njo Si Ti" and "Shumë pis" featuring Kosovar rapper Ledri Vula; the latter became her first single to enter the Albanian charts, peaking at number fifteen. On 30 December 2015, Istrefi released the single "BonBon", alongside an accompanying music video shot in Brezovica, Kosovo. It attained global virality and commercial success, peaking at number one in Albania and yielding Istrefi multiple Gold certifications in several countries worldwide. In February 2016, Istrefi signed to American labels Sony Music Entertainment and Ultra Music, and released an English version of "BonBon", alongside remix versions featuring American rapper Post Malone and American DJ Marshmello, in June.

On 24 February 2017, Istrefi released the single "Redrum", which features producer Felix Snow. It topped the charts in Albania, and was followed by the single "No I Love Yous" in September that year, featuring Moroccan-American rapper French Montana. In 2018, she released the single "Origami" featuring South African DJ Maphorisa, which was followed by the release of the official 2018 FIFA World Cup anthem "Live It Up" with American actor and rapper Will Smith and American singer Nicky Jam in May. She performed the song alongside Smith and Jam on 15 July at the closing ceremony of the World Cup Final. Throughout the rest of 2018, Istrefi released two more singles titled "Prisoner" and "Oh God"; the latter featured Jamaican singer Konshens. She was featured on American DJ Steve Aoki's album Neon Future III (2018) and English DJ Jonas Blue's album Blue (2018), which were both released on 19 November 2018.

In 2019, Istrefi collaborated with Belgian duo Dimitri Vegas & Like Mike on the single "Selfish", which topped the Billboard Dance Club Airplay chart. Two months later, she released the single "Nuk E Di" featuring Albanian singer Nora Istrefi, her sister. Istrefi then released the single "Sayonara детка" with Russian rapper Элджей, followed by a feature alongside American rapper Offset on the single "Let's Get Married" by Dutch duo Yellow Claw.

== Artistry ==
=== Musical style ===
Istrefi characterises her own music as spanning multiple genres, with her discography incorporating prominent elements of dancehall with hip hop, pop and electronic. Her music also incorporates electronic dance, reggae, techno and alternative. After the success of her single "BonBon" in 2016, various reviewers and critics compared her music style and appearance positively to that of Barbadian singer Rihanna and Australian singer Sia.

=== Influences ===
Istrefi has stated that reggae and Jamaican music were major inspirations for her music, as they were the two genres she enjoyed as a teenager. She has named Rihanna and Lana Del Rey as her idols and biggest musical influences. Istrefi also praised Rihanna for having been able to constantly reinvent herself successfully throughout her career. Istrefi also draws inspiration from the Kosovo-Albanian musician Nexhmije Pagarusha.

== Awards and nominations ==
Year award presented, name of the award ceremony, category, nominee(s) of the award, and the result of the nomination
| Year | Event | Category | Nominated work | Result |
|---|---|---|---|---|
| 2014 | VideoFest Awards | Best Performance | "E dehun" | Won |
| 2014 | VideoFest Awards | Best Styling | "E dehun" | Won |
| 2014 | VideoFest Awards | Best Female | "E dehun" | Nominated |
| 2014 | VideoFest Awards | Best New Artist | "Mani për money" | Won |
| 2014 | Zhurma Show Awards | Best New Artist | "E dehun" | Nominated |
| 2015 | Zhurma Show Awards | Best Collaboration | "Shumë pis" | Nominated |
| 2015 | Zhurma Show Awards | Internet Award | "Shumë pis" | Won |
| 2015 | Zhurma Show Awards | Best Song | "Shumë pis" | Nominated |
| 2016 | Top Music Awards | Collaboration of the Year | "Shumë pis" | Won |
| 2016 | Top Music Awards | Song of the Year | "Shumë pis" | Nominated |
| 2016 | Top Music Awards | Song of the Year | "BonBon" | Won |
| 2016 | Top Music Awards | Female Artist of the Year | "Herself" | Won |
| 2016 | Top Music Awards | Avantgarde Artist | "Herself" | Nominated |
| 2016 | Kult Awards | Song of the Year | "BonBon" | Nominated |
| 2016 | Big Apple Music Award | Hit of the Year | "BonBon" | Nominated |
| 2017 | Eurosonic Noorderslag | European Border Breakers Award | "Herself" | Won |
| 2017 | Eurosonic Noorderslag | Public Choice Award | "Herself" | Nominated |
| 2018 | Bama Music Awards | Best Albanian & Kosovar Act | "Herself" | Pending |
| 2019 | Russian National Music Awards | Best Hip-Hop Project of the Year | for "Элджей feat. Era Istrefi" | Won |
