= Hardwell discography =

Discography by Dutch DJ and record producer Hardwell

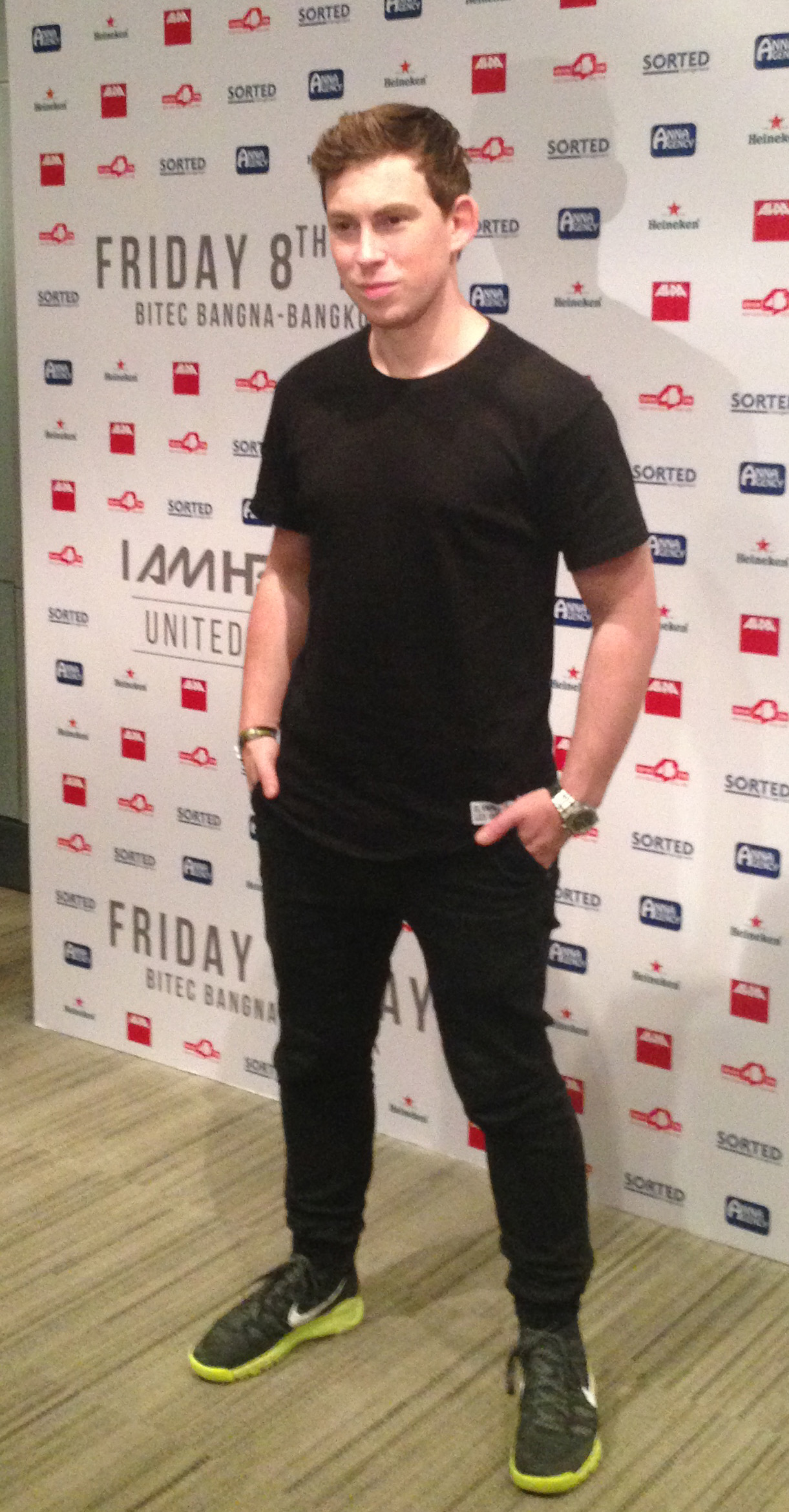
- Hardwell at Bitec Bangna in Bangkok, 2015
- Studio albums: 2
- EPs: 3
- Compilation albums: 8
- Singles: 150
- Remix albums: 1

Dutch DJ and record producer Robbert van de Corput, better known as Hardwell, has released two studio albums and eleven compilation albums, along with 116 singles. He first started producing in 2007 and gained international recognition with his bootleg of "Show Me Love vs Be" in 2009. In 2022, Hardwell returned with his second studio album, the 14-track Rebels Never Die.

== Albums ==
=== Studio albums ===
List of studio albums, with selected chart positions
Title	Album details	Peak chart positions								
Title	Album details	NLD	AUS	AUT	BEL	GER	SWE	SWI	UK	US
United We Are	Released: 23 January 2015; Label: Revealed; Formats: CD, digital download	1	41	6	13	11	35	4	83	85
Rebels Never Die	Released: 9 September 2022; Label: Revealed; Formats: CD, digital download, vinyl	29	—	—	146	—	—	—	—	—

=== Soundtrack albums ===
List of soundtrack albums, with selected chart positions
Title	Album details	Peak chart positions			
Title	Album details	NLD	AUT	GER	SWI
I Am Hardwell	Released: 22 November 2013; Label: Revealed, Cloud 9, Kontor; Formats: CD, digital download, DVD	98	49	83	37

=== Compilation albums ===
List of compilation albums, with selected chart positions
Title	Album details	Peak chart positions	
Title	Album details	AUT	SWI
Hardwell presents 'Revealed Volume 1'	Released: 29 October 2010; Label: Revealed; Formats: CD, digital download	—	—
Hardwell presents 'Revealed Volume 2'	Released: 22 July 2011; Label: Revealed; Formats: CD, digital download	—	—
Hardwell presents 'Revealed Volume 3'	Released: 6 July 2012; Label: Revealed; Formats: CD, digital download	—	—
Hardwell presents 'Revealed Volume 4'	Released: 21 June 2013; Label: Revealed; Formats: CD, digital download	25	8
Hardwell presents 'Revealed Volume 5'	Released: 20 June 2014; Label: Revealed; Formats: CD, digital download	34	6
Hardwell presents 'Revealed Volume 6'	Released: 19 June 2015; Label: Revealed; Formats: CD, digital download	16	5
Hardwell presents 'Revealed Volume 7'	Released: 24 June 2016; Label: Revealed; Formats: CD, digital download	—	11
Hardwell presents 'Revealed Volume 8'	Released: 13 October 2017; Label: Revealed; Formats: CD, digital download	—	10
Hardwell presents 'Revealed Volume 9'	Release: 12 October 2018; Label: Revealed; Formats: CD, Digital download	—	—
Hardwell presents 'Revealed Volume 10'	Released: 30 August 2019; Label: Revealed; Formats: CD, digital download	—	—
The Story of Hardwell	Released: 31 January 2020; Label: Revealed; Formats: CD, digital download, vinyl	—	—
"—" denotes a recording that did not chart or was not released in that territory.

=== Remix albums ===
List of remix albums, with selected chart positions
Title	Album details	Peak chart positions
Title	Album details	NLD
United We Are (Remixed)	Released: 4 December 2015; Label: Revealed; Formats: CD, digital download	44

=== DJ mix albums ===
List of albums consisting of a dj mix, with selected compilation chart positions
Title	Album details	Peak chart positions
Title	Album details	NLD
Eclectic Beatz	Released: 16 March 2006; Label: Digidance; Formats: CD, digital download	11
Eclectic Beatz 2	Released: 23 November 2006; Label: Digidance; Formats: CD, digital download	22
Eclectic Beatz 3	Released: 19 April 2007; Label: Digidance; Formats: CD, digital download	14
Eclectic Beatz 4	Released: 10 July 2007; Label: Digidance; Formats: CD, digital download	9
Eclectic Beatz 5	Released: 20 December 2007; Label: Digidance; Formats: CD, digital download	4
Eclectic Beatz 6	Released: 29 April 2008; Label: Digidance; Formats: CD, digital download	4
Eclectic Beatz 7	Released: 20 October 2008; Label: Digidance; Formats: CD, digital download	6
Eclectic Beatz 8 – The Miami Edition	Released: 5 June 2009; Label: Digidance; Formats: CD, digital download	4
Eclectic Beatz 9 – The After Summer Edition	Released: 23 October 2009; Label: Digidance; Formats: CD, digital download	6
Eclectic Beatz 10 – The Final Edition	Released: 21 May 2010; Label: Digidance; Formats: CD, digital download	9

== Extended plays ==
Title	Details
Hardwell & Friends Volume 1	Released: 28 July 2017; Label: Revealed Recordings; Format: Digital download
Hardwell & Friends Volume 2	Released: 25 August 2017; Label: Revealed Recordings; Format: Digital download
Hardwell & Friends Volume 3	Released: 26 January 2018; Label: Revealed Recordings; Format: Digital download
The Seduction (with Olly James)	Released: 7 April 2023; Label: Revealed Recordings; Format: Digital download

== Singles ==
List of singles as lead artist, with selected chart positions, showing year released and album name
Title	Year	Peak chart positions							Certifications	Album
Title	Year	NLD	AUS	AUT	BEL	FRA	GER	UK	Certifications	Album
"The Mirror" (with Franky Rizardo)	2006	—	—	—	—	—	—	—		Non-album singles
"Slammin'" (with Franky Rizardo)	2006	—	—	—	—	—	—	—		Non-album singles
"Soca Funk" (with Franky Rizardo)	2006	—	—	—	—	—	—	—		Non-album singles
"Never Knew Love" (with Greatski)	2007	40	—	—	—	—	—	—		Non-album singles
"Mrkrstft" (with R3hab)	2008	38	—	—	—	—	—	—		Non-album singles
"Enigma"	2008	88	—	—	—	—	—	—		Non-album singles
"Wake Up" (with DJ Jeroenski)	2008	—	—	—	—	—	—	—		Non-album singles
"Gate 76" (featuring Sunnery James & Ryan Marciano)	2008	—	—	—	—	—	—	—		Non-album singles
"Display" / "Storage"	2009	—	—	—	—	—	—	—		Non-album singles
"Twilight Zone"	2009	—	—	—	—	—	—	—		Non-album singles
"Feel So High" (featuring I-Fan)	2009	—	—	—	—	—	—	—		Non-album singles
"Blue Magic" (with R3hab)	2009	—	—	—	—	—	—	—		Non-album singles
"Get Down Girl" (with Funkadelic)	2010	—	—	—	—	—	—	—		Non-album singles
"Smoke / Voyage"	2010	—	—	—	—	—	—	—		Hardwell Presents 'Revealed, Vol. 1'
"Alright 2010" (with Red Carpet)	2010	—	—	—	—	—	—	—		Non-album singles
"Molotov"	2010	—	—	—	—	—	—	—		Non-album singles
"Move It 2 the Drum" (with Chuckie featuring MC Ambush)	2010	—	—	—	—	—	—	—		Non-album singles
"Asteroid" (with Franky Rizardo)	2010	—	—	—	—	—	—	—		Hardwell Presents 'Revealed, Vol. 1'
"Zero 76" (with Tiësto)	2011	19	—	—	49	—	—	—		Hardwell Presents 'Revealed, Vol. 2'
"Encoded"	2011	—	—	—	—	—	—	—		Hardwell Presents 'Revealed, Vol. 2'
"The World"	2011	—	—	—	—	—	—	—		Hardwell Presents 'Revealed, Vol. 2'
"Beta" (vs. Nicky Romero)	2011	—	—	—	—	—	—	—		Non-album singles
"Cobra"	2011	51	—	—	—	—	—	—		Non-album singles
"Munster" (with JoeySuki)	2011	—	—	—	—	—	—	—		Non-album singles
"Spaceman"	2012	—	—	—	55	79	—	—	RIAA: Gold	Hardwell Presents 'Revealed, Vol. 3'
"Kontiki" (with Dannic)	2012	—	—	—	—	—	—	—		Hardwell Presents 'Revealed, Vol. 3'
"Call Me a Spaceman" (featuring Mitch Crown)	2012	34	—	—	—	—	—	—		Hardwell Presents 'Revealed, Vol. 3'
"How We Do" (with Showtek)	2012	91	—	—	—	—	—	—		Non-album single
"Apollo" (featuring Amba Shepherd)	2012	46	—	71	68	70	—	—	NVPI: Platinum	Hardwell Presents 'Revealed, Vol. 4'
"Dynamo" (with Laidback Luke)	2013	—	—	—	—	—	—	—		Non-album single
"Never Say Goodbye" (with Dyro featuring Bright Lights)	2013	—	—	—	70	—	—	—		Hardwell Presents 'Revealed, Vol. 4'
"Three Triangles (Losing My Religion)"	2013	—	—	—	—	—	—	—		Until Now
"Jumper" (with W&W)	2013	—	—	—	—	141	—	—		Non-album singles
"Countdown" (with Makj)	2013	41	—	—	28	—	—	—		Non-album singles
"Dare You" (featuring Matthew Koma)	2013	40	—	—	13	—	—	18		Hardwell Presents 'Revealed, Vol. 5'
"Everybody Is in the Place"	2014	—	—	—	90	—	—	59		Hardwell Presents 'Revealed, Vol. 5'
"Arcadia" (with Joey Dale featuring Luciana)	2014	—	—	—	85	166	—	—		United We Are
"The Dance Floor Is Yours" (with W&W)	2014	—	—	—	—	—	—	—		Non-album single
"Young Again" (featuring Chris Jones)	2014	23	—	56	68	180	—	—	NVPI: Platinum	United We Are
"Don't Stop the Madness" (with W&W featuring Fatman Scoop)	2014	—	—	—	98	—	—	—		United We Are
"Eclipse"	2015	—	—	34	—	—	—	—		United We Are
"Sally" (featuring Harrison)	2015	56	—	33	86	—	60	—	NVPI: Gold	United We Are
"Echo" (featuring Jonathan Mendelsohn)	2015	—	—	—	79	—	—	—		United We Are
"Follow Me" (featuring Jason Derulo)	2015	84	26	—	68	—	—	—	ARIA: Gold; NVPI: Gold	United We Are
"Chameleon" (with Wiwek)	2015	—	—	—	—	—	—	—		Hardwell Presents 'Revealed, Vol. 6'
"Survivors" (with Dannic featuring Haris)	2015	—	—	—	—	—	—	—		Hardwell Presents 'Revealed, Vol. 6'
"Off the Hook" (with Armin van Buuren)	2015	—	—	—	101	—	—	—		Embrace
"Mad World" (featuring Jake Reese)	2015	78	—	—	68	117	—	—		Hardwell Presents 'Revealed, Vol. 7'
"Blackout"	2016	—	—	—	—	—	—	—		Non-album singles
"Hollywood" (with Afrojack)	2016	—	—	—	—	—	—	—		Non-album singles
"Run Wild" (featuring Jake Reese)	2016	—	—	—	95	—	—	—		Hardwell Presents 'Revealed, Vol. 7'
"Calavera" (with Kura)	2016	—	—	—	—	—	—	—		Hardwell Presents 'Revealed, Vol. 7'
"8Fifty" (with Thomas Newson)	2016	—	—	—	—	—	—	—		Hardwell Presents 'Revealed, Vol. 7'
"Live the Night" (with W&W featuring Lil Jon)	2016	—	—	—	92	112	—	—		Non-album single
"Wake Up Call"	2016	—	—	—	—	—	—	—		Hardwell Presents 'Revealed, Vol. 7'
"No Holding Back" (featuring Craig David)	2016	—	—	—	—	—	—	—		Following My Intuition
"Going Crazy" (with Blasterjaxx)	2016	—	—	—	—	—	—	—		Hardwell Presents 'Revealed, Vol. 7'
"Thinking About You" (featuring Jay Sean)	2016	64	—	—	89	—	—	—	NVPI: Gold	Non-album singles
"Get Down" (with W&W)	2016	—	—	—	—	—	—	—		Non-album singles
"Baldadig" (with Quintino)	2016	—	—	—	—	—	—	—		Non-album singles
"Party Till the Daylight"	2017	—	—	—	—	—	—	—		Non-album singles
"Creatures of the Night" (with Austin Mahone)	2017	99	—	—	—	—	—	—		Non-album singles
"We Are One" (featuring Jolin Tsai)	2017	—	—	—	—	—	—	—		Non-album singles
"Make the World Ours"	2017	—	—	—	—	—	—	—		Hardwell Presents Revealed Vol. 8
"We Are Legends" (with Kaaze featuring Jonathan Mendelsohn)	2017	—	—	—	—	—	—	—		Hardwell & Friends EP Vol. 1
"We Are One" (featuring Alexander Tidebrink)	2017	—	—	—	—	—	—	—		Hardwell & Friends EP Vol. 1
"Police (You Ain't Ready)" (with Kura featuring Anthony B)	2017	—	—	—	—	—	—	—		Hardwell & Friends EP Vol. 1
"All That We Are Living For" (with Atmozfears featuring M. Bronx)	2017	—	—	—	—	—	—	—		Hardwell & Friends EP Vol. 1
"Smash This Beat" (with Maddix)	2017	—	—	—	—	—	—	—		Hardwell & Friends EP Vol. 1
"Badam" (with Henry Fong featuring Mr. Vegas)	2017	—	—	—	—	—	—	—		Hardwell & Friends EP Vol. 2
"Still the One" (with Kill the Buzz featuring Max Collins)	2017	—	—	—	—	—	—	—		Hardwell & Friends EP Vol. 2
"What We Need" (featuring Haris)	2017	—	—	—	—	—	—	—		Hardwell & Friends EP Vol. 2
"Powermove" (with Moksi)	2017	—	—	—	—	—	—	—		Hardwell & Friends EP Vol. 2
"Here Once Again" (with Dr. Phunk)	2017	—	—	—	—	—	—	—		Hardwell & Friends EP Vol. 2
"Power" (with Kshmr)	2017	92	—	—	83	—	—	—		Hardwell Presents Revealed Vol. 8
"Hands Up" (with Afrojack featuring MC Ambush)	2017	—	—	—	—	—	—	—		Hardwell Presents Revealed Vol. 8
"The Universe"	2017	—	—	—	—	—	—	—		Hardwell Presents Revealed Vol. 8
"Who's in the House"	2017	—	—	—	—	—	—	—		Hardwell Presents Revealed Vol. 8
"The Underground" (with Timmy Trumpet)	2018	—	—	—	—	—	—	—		Hardwell & Friends EP Vol. 3
"Woest" (with Quintino)	2018	—	—	—	—	—	—	—		Hardwell & Friends EP Vol. 3
"Get Low" (with Sick Individuals)	2018	—	—	—	—	—	—	—		Hardwell & Friends EP Vol. 3
"Safari" (with Jewelz & Sparks)	2018	—	—	—	—	—	—	—		Hardwell & Friends EP Vol. 3
"Take Us Down (Feeding Our Hunger)" (with Dr Phunk featuring Jantine)	2018	—	—	—	—	—	—	—		Hardwell & Friends EP Vol. 3
"Ze Willen Mee" (with Bizzey, Lil' Kleine and Chivv)	2018	4	—	—	—	—	—	—		Non-album single
"Anthem" (with Steve Aoki)	2018	—	—	—	—	—	—	—		5OKI
"Thunder" (as Magnomite with Julian Calor)	2018	—	—	—	—	—	—	—		Non-album single
"Earthquake" (featuring Harrison)	2018	—	—	—	—	—	—	—		Hardwell Presents Revealed Vol. 9
"Conquerors (Part 1 & Part 2)" (with Metropole Orkest)	2018	—	—	—	—	—	—	—		Hardwell Presents Revealed Vol. 9
"Shine a Light" (with Wildstylez featuring KiFi)	2018	—	—	—	—	—	—	—		Hardwell Presents Revealed Vol. 9
"Bigroom Never Dies" (with Blasterjaxx)	2018	—	—	—	—	—	—	—		Hardwell Presents Revealed Vol. 9
"Unity" (with Dimitri Vegas & Like Mike)	2018	—	—	—	—	—	—	—		Tomorrowland 2018
"Bella Ciao" (with Maddix)	2018	—	—	—	—	—	—	—		Hardwell Presents Revealed Vol. 9
"This Is Love" (with Kaaze featuring Loren Allred)	2018	—	—	—	—	—	—	—		Hardwell Presents Revealed Vol. 9
"Light It Up" (with Suyano featuring Richie Loop)	2018	—	—	—	—	—	—	—		Hardwell Presents Revealed Vol. 9
"Out of This Town" (with Vinai featuring Cam Meekins)	2018	—	—	—	—	—	—	—		Hardwell Presents Revealed Vol. 9
"Kicking It Hard"	2018	—	—	—	—	—	—	—		Hardwell Presents Revealed Vol. 9
"How You Love Me" (featuring Conor Maynard and Snoop Dogg)	2018	—	—	—	79	—	—	—		Hardwell Presents Revealed Vol. 10
"Being Alive" (featuring Jguar)	2019	—	—	—	—	—	—	—		Hardwell Presents Revealed Vol. 10
"Chase the Sun" (with Dannic featuring Kelli-Leigh)	2019	—	—	—	—	—	—	—		Hardwell Presents Revealed Vol. 10
"I'm Not Sorry" (with Mike Williams)	2019	—	—	—	—	—	—	—		Hardwell Presents Revealed Vol. 10
"Summer Air" (featuring Trevor Guthrie)	2019	—	—	—	63	—	—	—		Hardwell Presents Revealed Vol. 10
"Reckless" (with Quintino)	2019	—	—	—	—	—	—	—		Hardwell Presents Revealed Vol. 10
"Retrograde"	2019	—	—	—	—	—	—	—		Hardwell Presents Revealed Vol. 10
"Drop to the Floor" (featuring Richie Loop)	2019	—	—	—	—	—	—	—		Hardwell Presents Revealed Vol. 10
"Left Right" (with Deorro and Makj featuring Fatman Scoop)	2019	—	—	—	—	—	—	—		Non-album single
"Go to War" (with Suyano)	2019	—	—	—	—	—	—	—		Hardwell Presents Revealed Vol. 10
"Into the Unknown"	2022	—	—	—	—	—	—	—		Rebels Never Die
"Broken Mirror"	2022	—	—	—	—	—	—	—		Rebels Never Die
"F*cking Society"	2022	—	—	—	—	—	—	—		Rebels Never Die
"Black Magic"	2022	—	—	—	—	—	—	—		Rebels Never Die
"Dopamine"	2022	—	—	—	—	—	—	—		Rebels Never Die
"Godd"	2022	—	—	—	—	—	—	—		Rebels Never Die
"Pacman"	2022	—	—	—	—	—	—	—		Rebels Never Die
"Mind Control"	2022	—	—	—	—	—	—	—		Rebels Never Die
"Reminisce"	2022	—	—	—	—	—	—	—		Rebels Never Die
"Zero Gravity"	2022	—	—	—	—	—	—	—		Rebels Never Die
"Laser"	2022	—	—	—	—	—	—	—		Rebels Never Die
"I Feel Like Dancing"	2022	—	—	—	—	—	—	—		Rebels Never Die
"Self Destruct"	2022	—	—	—	—	—	—	—		Rebels Never Die
"Balança" (with Vinne)	2023	—	—	—	—	—	—	—		Non-album singles
"Twisted" (with Will Sparks)	2023	—	—	—	—	—	—	—		Non-album singles
"Sloopkogel" (with Quintino)	2023	—	—	—	—	—	—	—		Non-album singles
"Revolution" (with Timmy Trumpet and Maddix)	2023	—	—	—	—	—	—	—		Non-album singles
"Flatline" (with Olly James)	2023	—	—	—	—	—	—	—		Non-album singles
"Seduction" (with Olly James)	2023	—	—	—	—	—	—	—		Non-album singles
"Judgement Day" (with Sub Zero Project)	2023	—	—	—	—	—	—	—		Non-album singles
"Acid" (with Maddix featuring Luciana)	2023	—	—	—	—	—	—	—		Non-album singles
"Anybody Out There" (with Azteck featuring Alex Hepburn)	2023	—	—	—	—	—	—	—		Non-album singles
"The Abyss" (with Space 92)	2023	—	—	—	—	—	—	—		Non-album singles
"Human" (with Machine Made)	2023	—	—	—	—	—	—	—		Non-album singles
"Shotgun (It Ain't Over)" (with Bright Lights)	2023	—	—	—	—	—	—	—		Non-album singles
"I Wanna Dance" (with Nicky Romero featuring Meryll)	2023	—	—	—	—	—	—	—		Non-album singles
"Loneliness" (with DJs From Mars and Tomcraft)	2023	—	—	—	—	—	—	—		Non-album singles
"Push It" (with Afrojack featuring Meryll)	2023	—	—	—	—	—	—	—		Non-album singles
"Goes Like This" (with Shortround)	2023	—	—	—	—	—	—	—		Non-album singles
"Oldskool Sound"	2024	—	—	—	—	—	—	—		Non-album singles
"Energy" (with Bassjackers)	2024	—	—	—	—	—	—	—		Non-album singles
"16" (with Blasterjaxx & Maddix)	2024	—	—	—	—	—	—	—		Non-album singles
"Move" (with Kaaze)	2024	—	—	—	—	—	—	—		Non-album singles
"XTC"	2024	—	—	—	—	—	—	—		Non-album singles
"I'm the Devil" (with Avao)	2024	—	—	—	—	—	—	—		Non-album singles
"Follow the Light" (with Armin van Buuren)	2024	—	—	—	—	—	—	—		Breathe
"Falling in Love" (with Outsiders)	2024	—	—	—	—	—	—	—		Non-album singles
"No Sleep" (with Sarah De Warren)	2024	—	—	—	—	—	—	—		Non-album singles
"Cambodia" (with Vorwerk)	2024	—	—	—	—	—	—	—		Non-album singles
"Sanctuary"	2025	—	—	—	—	—	—	—		Non-album singles
"Lift Off"	2025	—	—	—	—	—	—	—		Non-album singles
"Beat of the Drum" (with Blasterjaxx)	2025	—	—	—	—	—	—	—		Non-album singles
"Hideaway" (with Atmozfears featuring Jaimes)	2025	—	—	—	—	—	—	—		Non-album singles
"Rave Till My Grave" (with Maddix featuring Villain)	2025	—	—	—	—	—	—	—		Non-album singles
"Zonder jou" (with Flemming)	2026	94	—	—	—	—	—	—		Non-album singles
"—" denotes a recording that did not chart or was not released in that territory.

== Remixes ==
Year	Title	Original artist
2007	"Lass uns tanzen" (Hardwell and Greatski Late At Night Remix)	Scooter
2007	"Samir`s Theme" (Hardwell Mix)	DJ Debonair Samir
2008	"Cré Sabe 2008" (Hardwell Sunset Mix)	Carlos Silva (featuring Nelson Freitas and Q-Plus)
2008	"Break Down The House" (Hardwell and R3HAB Remix)	Laidback Luke
2008	"Hot Stuff" (Hardwell Sunrise Mix)	EliZe
2008	"Dance Dance" (Hardwell Remix)	Booty Luv
2008	"I Don't Mind" (Hardwell and R3HAB Remix)	Hi_Tack
2008	"If You Knew" (Hardwell and R3HAB Dub Mix)	Chris Lake (featuring Nastala)
2008	"Show Me Love" (Hardwell Sunrise Mix)	Steve Angello & Laidback Luke (featuring Robin S.)
2009	"Broken Tonight" (Hardwell Dutch Club Mix)	Armin van Buuren (featuring VanVelzen)
2009	"Scared Of Me" (Hardwell Remix)	Fedde Le Grande (featuring Mitch Crown)
2009	"Play That Beat" (Hardwell Mix)	DJ Jean
2009	"Peace Song" (Hardwell Remix)	Bob Sinclar (featuring Steve Edwards)
2009	"Remember" (Hardwell Remix)	Funkerman (featuring I-Fan)
2009	"Mas Que Nada" (Hardwell & R3HAB Remix)	Gregor Salto (featuring Helena Mendes)
2009	"Let the Feelings Go" (Hardwell Mix)	AnnaGrace
2009	"What Say?" (Hardwell Remix)	Sander van Doorn and Marco V
2009	"Moombah!" (Hardwell and R3HAB Mix)	Silvio Ecomo and Chuckie
2009	"Foreign Affair" (Hardwell Remix)	Sylver
2010	"At The End" (Hardwell Extended Mix)	Nadia Ali
2010	"Lethal Industry" (Hardwell Remix)	Tiësto
2010	"Afrika" (Hardwell Revealed Remix)	Franky Rizardo
2010	"Dig.It.All" (Hardwell Edit)	JoeySuki
2010	"Switched" (Hardwell and DJ Funkadelic Remix)	Nicky Romero
2010	"Coriander" (Hardwell and R3HAB Remix)	René Amesz
2011	"Hangover" (Hardwell Extended Remix)	Taio Cruz (featuring Flo Rida)
2011	"Who Dat Girl" (Hardwell Club Mix)	Flo Rida (featuring Akon)
2011	"Fight Club Is Closed" (It's Time For Rock'n'Roll) (Hardwell Remix)	Dada Life
2011	"Love Comes Again" (Hardwell Rework)	Tiësto (featuring BT)
2011	"Boy" (Hardwell Remix)	Adrian Lux (featuring Rebecca & Fiona)
2011	"In The Air" (Hardwell Remix)	Morgan Page, Sultan + Ned Shepard and BT (featuring Angela McCluskey)
2011	"Ready 2 Go" (Hardwell Remix)	Martin Solveig (featuring Kele)
2011	"What A Feeling" (Hardwell Remix)	Alex Gaudino (featuring Kelly Rowland)
2011	"Nobody Loves Me" (Hardwell Remix)	Bella
2011	"Passion" (Hardwell Edit)	Jake Shanahan & Sebastien Lintz
2011	"Dawn" (Hardwell Edit)	Michael Brun
2011	"Physical" (Hardwell Remix)	Haley
2012	"Young Blood" (Tiësto and Hardwell Remix)	The Naked and Famous
2012	"Say Nothing" (Hardwell and Dannic Remix)	Example
2012	"Chasing The Sun" (Hardwell Edit)	The Wanted
2012	"Where Have You Been" (Hardwell Club Mix)	Rihanna
2012	"Elements" (Hardwell and Dannic Remix)	Franky Rizardo & Roul & Doors
2012	"Zelda" (Hardwell Edit)	NO_ID & Martin Volt
2013	"Alive" (Hardwell The Final Remix)	Krewella
2013	"Man With The Red Face" (Hardwell Remix)	Mark Knight & Funkagenda
2013	"Fifteen" (Hardwell Edit)	Blasterjaxx
2013	"Are You Ready" (Hardwell Rework)	Joe Ghost
2014	"A Sky Full of Stars" (Hardwell Remix)	Coldplay
2014	"Rambo" (Hardwell Edit)	Deorro & J-Trick
2014	"Ping Pong" (Hardwell Remix)	Armin van Buuren
2014	"Knock You Out" (Hardwell Remix)	Bingo Players
2015	"Outside" (Hardwell Remix)	Calvin Harris (featuring Ellie Goulding)
2015	"Locked & Loaded" (Hardwell Edit)	Domeno & Michael Sparks
2015	"Scorpion" (Hardwell Edit)	Quintino
2015	"Ocarina Of Time's Valley" (from "The Legend of Zelda") (Hardwell Remix)	Koji Kondo
2015	"Hakuna Matata" (Hardwell Edit)	R3HAB
2016	"Baile De Favela" (Hardwell Remix)	MC João
2016	"Faded" (Hardwell Remix)	Alan Walker
2016	"Don't Let Me Down" (Hardwell and Sephyx Remix)	The Chainsmokers (featuring Daya)
2016	"Go" (Hardwell Remix)	Moby
2016	Crank (HWL Edit)	Jewelz & Sparks
2016	"Thinking About You" (Hardwell and Kaaze Festival Mix)	Hardwell (featuring Jay Sean)
2017	"Break The House Down" (Hardwell Edit)	Kill The Buzz
2017	"Go Down Low" (Hardwell Edit)	Badd Dimes
2017	"Mi Gente" (Hardwell and Quintino Remix)	J Balvin and Willy William
2017	"Eclipse" (Hardwell and Kaaze Festival Mix)	Hardwell
2018	"Everytime We Touch" (Hardwell & Maurice West Remix)	Cascada
2018	"Do It Till Your Face Hurts" (Hardwell Edit)	Dada Life
2018	"The Beat" (Hardwell Edit)	Mike Williams
2018	"Summer of Love" (Hardwell Remix)	U2
2022	"I Want You" (Hardwell Remix)	La Fuente
2023	"Satisfaction" (Hardwell & Maddix Remix)	David Guetta vs. Benny Benassi
2023	"Miracle" (Hardwell Remix)	Calvin Harris (featuring Ellie Goulding)
2024	"I Don't Wanna Wait" (Hardwell & Olly James Remix)	David Guetta & OneRepublic
2024	"Control Your Body" (Hardwell Edit)	Nifra & 2 Unlimited
2025	"Body Move" (Hardwell Edit)	MatricK
2025	"Insane" (Hardwell Remix)	Dark Monks
