= List of awards and nominations received by Hardwell =

Dutchman Hardwell, in his career as a DJ and musician, has received numerous awards and nominations.

== DJ Awards ==
Year	Category	Outcome	Ref
2012	Best European DJ	Nominated	
2013	Best Electro-House	Won	
2014	Best Electro-House	Won	
2015	Best International DJ	Won	
2015	Best Electro/Progressive House	Won	
2016	Best International DJ	Nominated	
2016	Best Big Room House DJ	Won	
2017	Best International DJ	Won	
2017	Best Big Room House	Won	

== DJ Magazine top 100 DJs ==
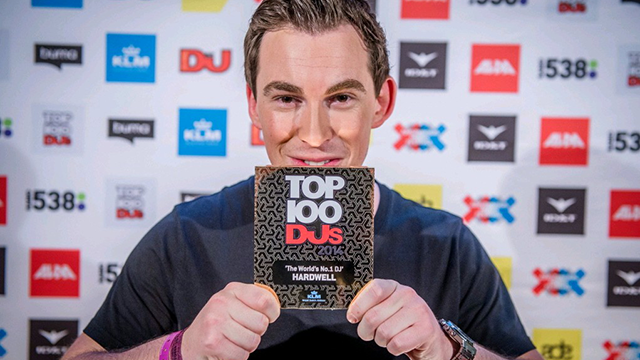
Hardwell being crowned DJ Mag's number one DJ in 2014.

Year	Position	Notes	Ref.
2011	24	New Entry	
2012	6	Up 18	
2013	1	Up 5	
2014	1	No Change	
2015	2	Down 1	
2016	3	Down 1	
2017	4	Down 1	
2018	3	Up 1	
2019	12	Down 9	
2020	17	Down 5	
2021	105	Down 88	
2022	43	Up 62	
2023	37	Up 6	
2024	11	Up 26	
2025	15	Down 4	

== International Dance Music Awards ==
Year	Category	Recipient	Outcome	Ref
2012	Best Breakthrough DJ	Hardwell	Won	
2013	Best Global DJ	Hardwell	Won	
2013	Best Radio Mix Show DJ	Hardwell	Nominated	
2013	Best Remixer	Hardwell	Won	
2013	Best Electro/Progressive House Track	Hardwell - "Spaceman"	Nominated	
2013	Best Electro/Tech House Track	Hardwell - "Spaceman"	Nominated	
2013	Best Podcast	Hardwell On Air	Nominated	
2014	Best Global DJ	Hardwell	Won	
2014	Best Progressive House/Electro DJ	Hardwell	Won	
2014	Best Producer	Hardwell	Nominated	
2014	Best Electro/Progressive House Track	Hardwell featuring Amba Shepherd - "Apollo"	Nominated	
2014	Best Featured Vocalist Performance	Hardwell featuring Amba Shepherd - "Apollo"	Won	
2014	Best Podcast or Radio Mixshow DJ	Hardwell On Air	Nominated	
2015	Best Global DJ	Hardwell	Won	
2015	Best Progressive House/Electro DJ	Hardwell	Won	
2015	Best Artist	Hardwell	Nominated	
2015	Best Producer	Hardwell	Nominated	
2015	Best Remixer	Hardwell	Nominated	
2015	Best Electro/Progressive House Track	Hardwell & Joey Dale featuring Luciana - "Arcadia"	Won	
2015	Best Compilation or Full Length DJ Mix	Hardwell Presents Revealed Volume 5	Won	
2015	Best Podcast or Radio Mixshow DJ	Hardwell On Air	Won	
2015	Best Global Music Label	Revealed Recordings	Nominated	
2016	Best Global DJ	Hardwell	Won	
2016	Best European DJ	Hardwell	Nominated	
2016	Best Progressive House/Electro DJ	Hardwell	Won	
2016	Best Artist	Hardwell	Won	
2016	Best Producer	Hardwell	Nominated	
2016	Best Remixer	Hardwell	Nominated	
2016	Best R&B/Urban Dance Track	Hardwell featuring Jason Derulo - "Follow Me"	Nominated	
2016	Best Electro/Progressive House Track	Hardwell featuring Jake Reese - "Mad World"	Nominated	
2016	Best Compilation or Full Length DJ Mix	Hardwell Presents Revealed Volume 6	Won	
2016	Best Podcast or Radio Mixshow DJ	Hardwell On Air	Won	
2016	Best Featured Vocalist Performance	Hardwell featuring Jake Reese - "Mad World"	Won	
2016	Best Global Music Label	Revealed Recordings	Nominated	
2018	Best Male Artist (Mainstream)	Hardwell	Nominated	
2018	Best Podcast/Radio Show	Hardwell On Air	Nominated	
2018	Best Label (Global)	Revealed Recordings	Nominated	

== MTV European Music Awards ==
Year	Category	Outcome	Ref
2014	Best Dutch Act	Won	
2014	Best Electronic Act	Nominated	
2014	Best World Performance	Nominated	

== NRJ Music Awards ==
Year	Category	Outcome	Ref
2016	Best International DJ	Nominated	

== World Dance Music Radio Awards ==
Year	Category	Recipient	Outcome	Ref
2018	Best DJ	Hardwell	Nominated	
2018	Best Dance Floor Track	Hardwell and KSHMR - "Power"	Won	
