= Hardwell & Friends Vol. 2 =

EP by Hardwell
- Released: August 25, 2017
- Recorded: 2016–17
- Genre: Trap, progressive house, electro house, bass house, big room house, hardstyle, moombahton
- Length: 15:55
- Label: Revealed Recordings
- Producer: Hardwell, Henry Fong, Kill the Buzz, Willem L Bakker, Moksi, Dr. Phunk

Hardwell chronology
Hardwell & Friends Vol. 1 (2017)	Hardwell & Friends Vol. 2 (2017)	Hardwell & Friends Vol. 3 (2018)

Singles from Hardwell & Friends Vol. 2
- 1. "Badam (with Henry Fong feat. Mr. Vegas)" Released: August 22, 2017; 2. "Still the One (with Kill the Buzz feat. Max Collins)" Released: August 23, 2017; 3. "What We Need (feat. Haris)" Released: August 24, 2017; 4. "Powermove (with Moksi)" Released: August 25, 2017; 5. "Here Once Again (with Dr. Phunk)" Released: August 26, 2017

Hardwell & Friends Vol. 2 is the second volume of two EPs that were released in summer 2017. They are recorded by Dutch DJ and record producer Robbert Van De Corput, better known as Hardwell. The release of the first part was done on 28 July 2017 by Hardwell's own record label Revealed Recordings.

== Background ==
Since "Badam" was confirmed to be part of one of the EPs and was not part of the first ones tracklist it was clear to be part of the second one. In an interview, Hardwell confirmed also that he is thinking about the release of a third collection of songs. In a further one he told to be working on it already.

In the middle of August 2017 the cover of the EP appeared on the Internet. In addition to Hardwell, each individual cooperation partner is featured on the EP. Only Max Collins, singer of Still the One is not featured on the cover. During the 330th episode of his "Hardwell On Air" podcast he played the entire tracklist as a minimix.

Hardwell released a teaser of the EP's first single on Monday, August 21, 2017, called "Badam". It's a dark Caribbean and Middle Eastern-influenced sound featuring Henry Fong and Mr. Vegas.

The two eps were rumored to replace the annual "Hardwell presents Revealed" volume for 2017, but in early September, Hardwell announced that he is mixing the 8th volume. Days earlier he talked about a third volume of the "Hardwell & Friends EPs".

== Singles ==
- "Badam" appeared as the first single on August 21, 2017. The track was created in collaboration with the DJ and producer Henry Fong as well as the dancehall musician Mr. Vegas, whom Hardwell describes as one of his childhood heroes. He said that a promotion partner made him being in contact with him, while he had already been in contact with Henry Fong for some time. Hardwell calls the track one of his personal favorites of all time. After the premiere was done at the Ultra Music Festival, he announced in an interview with Ultra Singapore in early June 2017 that the song would be a part of the EP. "Badam" embodies a strong Moombahton production.
- "Still the One" followed on 22 August 2017. The production was done in collaboration with the Dutch DJ and producer Kill the Buzz as well as singer Max Collins. "Still the One" is not the first collaboration of the two Dutch since they collaborated with the song "Don't Give Up" in 2014 as well as the "Break the House Down" in 2015. Both appeared under Kill the Buzz' name only. The track was created after Kill the Buzz played the instrumental, and Hardwell noted that the vocals of one of his songs would fit perfectly to Kill the Buzz' production. Together they combined the songs and celebrated its premiere in early 2017 at one of Kill the Buzz' performances.
- "What We Need" was released on August 23, 2017, after it was already produced in 2014. In addition to Hardwell, the producer Willem Bakker was involved. They were already working together due to the devopment of Hardwells chart success "Young Again". The Dutch singer songwriter Haris Alagic also acted as author and singer of the song. Since the beginning of 2015 the song was part of Hardwell's performances. At ADE and his final "United We Are" show at Hockenheimring, he took Haris on stage. In the latter, Hardwell announced that the song was his upcoming single, which did not prove true. On 1 August 2017, Haris replied to a tweet on Twitter, stating that they plan "something special" with the track. Regarding to that, it was confirmed that the song would be released in the course of the second EP.
- "Powermove" will be released on August 24, 2017. It was developed in collaboration with the DJ duo Moksi. This has already been in touch with Hardwell through a remix to his single "Mad World". "Powermove" is strongly inspired by Moksi's bass house style and was premiered by Hardwell at Ultra Music Festival 2017. Moksi then announced at their show at Slam FM that this was a collaboration track and will be titled "Powermove".
- "Here Once Again" closed the release series on August 25, 2017. On this track, Hardwell collaborated with the Hardstyle DJ Dr. Phunk, on whose style the track is based. Since its premiere Dr. Phunk hints in several Q&As, that the release will be happen soon and made clear that they would not postpone the release, as for example Hardwell and Martin Garrix did it with "MusicBox", until they cancel it after two years. A first collaboration came in early 2016 at a Remix-EP Dr. Phunk did for selected Hardwell songs.

== Track listing ==
No.	Title	Writer(s)	Producer(s)	Length
1.	"Badam" (with Henry Fong featuring Mr. Vegas)	Robbert van de Corput; Henry Jung Ming Fong; Clifford Smith	Hardwell; Henry Fong	2:52
2.	"Still the One" (with Kill the Buzz featuring Max Collins)	Robert van de Corput; Adithya Nanuru; James Maxwell Stuart Collins	Hardwell; Kill The Buzz	3:36
3.	"What We Need" (featuring Haris)	Corput; van de Corput; Haris Alagic; Willem L Bakker	Hardwell; Willem L Bakker	3:13
4.	"Powermove" (with Moksi)	Corput; van de Corput; Samir Ait Moh Nait Lhaj; Diego L. J. W. Stijnen	Hardwell; Moksi	2:54
5.	"Here Once Again" (with Dr. Phunk)	Corput; Nicholas Hook; Morgan King; Emrick Hans Larsson	Hardwell; Dr. Phunk	3:20

== Release history ==
Region	Date	Format	Label
Worldwide	25 August 2017	digital download; stream	Revealed Records
