= Hardwell & Friends Vol. 1 =

EP by Hardwell
- Released: 28 July 2017
- Genre: Big room, hardstyle, jungle terror, progressive house, trap
- Label: Revealed
- Producer: Atmozfears; Hardwell; Kaaze; Kura; Maddix; W&W

Hardwell chronology
United We Are (2015)	Hardwell & Friends Vol. 1 (2017)	Hardwell & Friends Vol. 2 (2017)

Singles from Hardwell & Friends Vol. 1
- 1. "We Are Legends" Released: 24 July 2017; 2. "We Are One" Released: 25 July 2017; 3. "Police (You Ain't Ready)" Released: 26 July 2017; 4. "All That We Are Living For" Released: 27 July 2017; 5. "Smash This Beat" Released: 28 July 2017

Hardwell & Friends Vol. 1 is the debut extended play by Dutch DJ Robbert Van De Corput, better known as Hardwell. Released on 28 July 2017, it is the first volume of the Hardwell & Friends EP series.

== Background ==
Hardwell announced the release of two EPs on 10 June 2017 during an interview at Ultra Singapore. He also announced the song "Badam" with Henry Fong and Mr. Vegas. In mid of July 2017, the cover art of the first volume appeared on the internet.

== Singles ==
Before it was released, Hardwell published the tracklist as single-tracks on Spotify and iTunes. "We Are Legends" was the first single, released on 24 July 2017. It was first played at Castello A Mare, Palermo, Italy in June 2016, but indeed as an instrumental version.

"We Are One" was published one day after and premiered at Ultra Music Festival 2016. On 20 June 2017, the song was already released in different Asian countries with vocals by Taiwanese singer Jolin Tsai.

"Police (You Ain't Ready)" was released as the third single on 25 July 2017. It was produced with Portuguese DJ Kura, who collaborated with Hardwell once, for the song "Calavera".

"All That We Are Living For" followed on 27 July 2017. It was developed in cooperation with Atmozfears and singer M.Bronx.

"Smash This Beat" was published on 28 July 2017 as the final release. Behind the track, there is a collaboration with newcomer Maddix, who is part of Revealed Recording since 2016.

== Track listing ==
No.	Title	Writer(s)	Producer(s)	Length
1.	"We Are Legends" (with Kaaze & Jonathan Mendelsohn)	Robbert van de Corput; Mick Peter Diddi Kastenholt; Jonathan Mendelsohn	Hardwell; Kaaze	4:20
2.	"We Are One" (featuring Alexander Tidebrink)	Corput; Michael Alexander Tidebrink Stomberg; Robin van Loenen; Wardt van der Harst; Willem van Hanegem	Hardwell; W&W	4:20
3.	"Police (You Ain't Ready)" (with KURA x Anthony B)	Corput; Rúben de Almeida; LLoyd Kevin James; Keith Anthony Blair	Hardwell; KURA	3:42
4.	"All That We Are Living For" (with Atmozfears & M.Bronx)	Corput; Tim van de Stadt; Rupert Blackman; Dennis Baffoe; Tim Boomsma	Hardwell; Atmozfears	4:22
5.	"Smash This Beat" (with Maddix)	Corput; Pablo Rindt	Hardwell; Maddix	3:56

== Release history ==
Region	Date	Format	Label
Worldwide	28 July 2017	digital download; stream	Revealed Records
