= Don't Stop the Madness =

2014 single by Hardwell and W&W

Single by Hardwell and W&W featuring Fatman Scoop

from the album United We Are
- Released: 22 December 2014
- Recorded: 2013–14
- Genre: Big room house
- Length: 3:45
- Label: Revealed; Cloud 9 Dance
- Songwriters: Robbert van de Corput; Willem van Hanegem; Wardt van der Harst; Isaac Freeman; Danny Boselovic; Nick Ditri
- Producers: Hardwell; W&W

Hardwell singles chronology
"Young Again" (2014)	"Don't Stop the Madness" (2014)	"Eclipse" (2015)

W&W singles chronology
"Waves" (2014)	"Don't Stop the Madness" (2014)	"Rave After Rave" (2015)

Fatman Scoop singles chronology
"Recess" (2014)	"Don't Stop the Madness" (2014)	"Squad Out!" (2015)

"Don't Stop the Madness" is a song by Dutch DJs Hardwell and W&W. It features hip hop artist Fatman Scoop. It is the third single from Hardwell's 2015 debut studio album United We Are.

== Background ==
Hardwell performed the song at Tomorrowland in July 2013.

== Track listing ==
No.	Title	Length
1.	"Don't Stop the Madness"	3:45
2.	"Don't Stop the Madness" (extended mix)	4:59

== Charts ==
Chart (2015)	Peak position
Belgium (Ultratip Bubbling Under Flanders)	48
