= Everybody Is in the Place =

Single by Hardwell

from the album Hardwell Presents Revealed Volume 5
- Released: 18 April 2014
- Recorded: 2013
- Genre: Big room house
- Length: 5:52
- Label: Revealed; Cloud 9 Dance
- Songwriters: Robbert van de Corput; Willem van Hanegem; Wardt van der Harst
- Producers: Hardwell; W&W

Hardwell singles chronology
"Dare You" (2013)	"Everybody Is in the Place" (2014)	"Arcadia" (2014)

"Everybody Is in the Place" is a single by Dutch DJ Hardwell.

== Background ==
A music video consisting of fan footage shot for the single was uploaded by Hardwell. The song became Revealed Recordings' 100th released single.

== Track listing ==
No.	Title	Length
1.	"Everybody Is in the Place"	5:52

== Charts ==
Chart (2016)	Peak position
Belgium (Ultratip Bubbling Under Wallonia)	42
UK Singles (OCC)	59
