= Arcadia (Hardwell and Joey Dale song) =

Single by Hardwell and Joey Dale featuring Luciana

from the album United We Are
- Released: 7 July 2014
- Genre: Electro house; progressive house; big room house; EDM
- Length: 3:13
- Label: Revealed; Cloud 9 Dance
- Songwriters: Robbert van de Corput; Joey Daleboudt; Luciana Caporaso; Nick Clow
- Producers: Hardwell; Joey Dale

Hardwell singles chronology
"Everybody Is in the Place" (2014)	"Arcadia" (2014)	"Young Again" (2014)

Joey Dale singles chronology
"About the Drop Out" (2014)	"Arcadia" (2014)	"Step Into Your Light" (2014)

Luciana singles chronology
"We Got It All" (2014)	"Arcadia" (2014)	"No Heroes" (2014)

"Arcadia" is a song by Dutch DJs Hardwell and Joey Dale. It features singer Luciana. It is the first single from Hardwell's 2015 debut studio album United We Are.

== Track listing ==
No.	Title	Length
1.	"Arcadia"	3:13
2.	"Arcadia" (extended mix)	4:58

== Charts ==
Chart (2015)	Peak position
Belgium (Ultratip Bubbling Under Flanders)	75
Belgium (Ultratip Bubbling Under Wallonia)	35
France (SNEP)	166
