= Never Say Goodbye (Hardwell and Dyro song) =

Single by Hardwell and Dyro featuring Bright Lights

from the album Hardwell Presents Revealed Volume 4
- Released: 20 May 2013
- Genre: Big room house
- Length: 3:25 (Radio Edit); 5:23 (Original Mix)
- Label: Revealed; Cloud 9 Dance
- Songwriters: Robbert van de Corput; Jordy van Egmond; Heather Bright
- Producers: Hardwell; Dyro

Hardwell singles chronology
"Apollo" (2012)	"Never Say Goodbye" (2013)	"Jumper" (2013)

Dyro singles chronology
"You Gotta Know" (2013)	"Never Say Goodbye" (2013)	"Leprechauns & Unicorns" (2013)

Bright Lights singles chronology
"I Dare You" (2013)	"Never Say Goodbye" (2013)	"Escape" (2013)

"Never Say Goodbye" is a song by Dutch DJs and producers Hardwell and Dyro. It features vocals from American singer and songwriter Bright Lights. It is the second single from Hardwell's compilation, Hardwell Presents Revealed Volume 4.

== Background ==
The song was teased for the first time during Hardwell's show at Ultra Music Festival 2013, in Miami.

== Critical review ==
7 years after the release of the song, Pol Torà from webmedia We Rave You thinks that "the crazy melody and energy of the song hasn’t gone out to date and still gives that festival goosebump feeling". 8 years after its release, Dylan Smith from webmedia EDM Network writes a similar report, reminding that "‘Never Say Goodbye’ provided an essential soundtrack to the peak time skyline in the summer of 2013."

== Music video ==
A music video for the song was published on 2 July 2013 by Hardwell's Youtube channel.Video on YouTube It was filmed in Tokyo subway, Japan.

== Track listing ==
Netherlands - Digital download - Revealed (REVR061)

1. "Never Say Goodbye" – 5:23

Netherlands - Digital download - Revealed (REVR062)

1. "Never Say Goodbye" (Radio Edit) – 3:25
2. "Never Say Goodbye" – 5:23

Wildstylez Remix - Netherlands - Digital download - Revealed (REVRSP010)

1. "Never Say Goodbye" (Wildstylez Radio Edit) – 3:17

Wildstylez Remix - Netherlands - Digital download - Revealed (REVR071)

1. "Never Say Goodbye" (Wildstylez Remix) – 6:00

== Charts ==
Chart (2013)	Peak position
Belgium (Ultratip Bubbling Under Wallonia)	20
US Dance/Mix Show Airplay (Billboard)	6
