= Follow Me (Hardwell song) =

Single by Hardwell featuring Jason Derulo

from the album United We Are
- Released: 7 August 2015
- Length: 3:19
- Label: Revealed; Cloud 9 Dance
- Songwriters: Robbert van de Corput; James 'JHart' Abrahart; Jason Desrouleaux; Djibril Gibson Kagni; Jordan "Trackstorm" Houyez; Dino "SIRIUS" Cirone
- Producer: Hardwell

Hardwell singles chronology
"Echo" (2015)	"Follow Me" (2015)	"Mad World" (2015)

Jason Derulo singles chronology
"Cheyenne" (2015)	"Follow Me" (2015)	"Drive You Crazy" (2015)

"Follow Me" is a song by Dutch DJ and record producer Hardwell, featuring American singer Jason Derulo. The song is the seventh and last single of Hardwell's debut studio album, United We Are. It was released on 7 August 2015 by Central Station Records.

It peaked on the Australian Singles Chart at number 26, making it the first Hardwell release to chart in Australia.

== Background ==
Hardwell says it was the first time he had ever made a track over Skype. He said he was in Breda whilst Derulo was in Miami and "it was a back and forth thing".

When speaking of the collaboration, Hardwell said; "Getting the chance to work with Jason on this album was a dream moment for me. I've been a huge fan of his work for a long time now. I had the idea of the track I wanted to make with him for a while; combining my sound and style with his distinct voice and lyrical flair, it was always going to be something special".

Derulo said; "When Hardwell and I decided to work together, I knew the potential of what we would be able to create was incredible, but "Follow Me" is a game changer that I can't wait to share with the fans".

== Music video ==
The music video for "Follow Me" was released on YouTube on 17 July 2015. Directed By Colin Tilley

== Chart performance ==
Chart performance for "Follow Me"
Chart (2015–2016)	Peak position
Argentina (Los 40 Principales)	4
Australia (ARIA)	26
Belgium (Ultratip Bubbling Under Flanders)	56
Belgium (Ultratip Bubbling Under Wallonia)	18
Japan Hot 100 (Billboard)	39
Netherlands (Single Top 100)	84

== Certifications ==
Certifications for "Follow Me"
Region	Certification	Certified units/sales
Australia (ARIA)	Gold	35,000^{‡}
Netherlands (NVPI)	Gold	15,000^{‡}
^{‡} Sales+streaming figures based on certification alone.
