= Sartek =

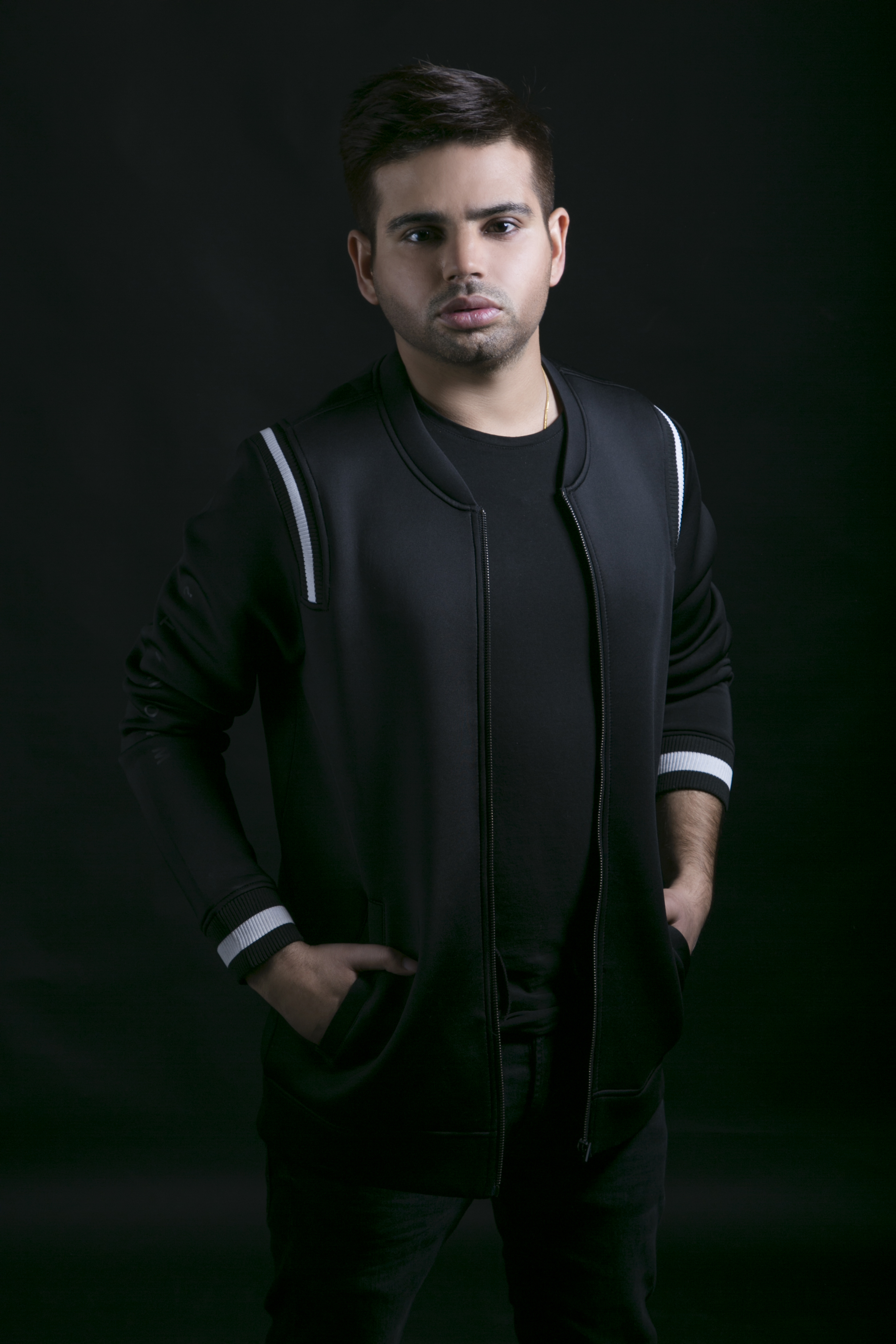
- Born: Sarthak Sardana; 24 July 1988 (age 38); India
- Occupations: DJ; record producer; musician
- Years active: 2013-present
- Musical career
- Genres: EDM
- Instrument: Digital audio workstation
- Labels: Revealed, Armada Music & Disco:wax (Sony Music)

Sarthak Sardana (born 24 July 1988), better known by his stage name Sartek, is an Indian DJ and music producer.

== Career ==
He is the first Indian DJ on Hardwell's Revealed Recordings and to have all the releases on Beatport Top 100 charts. He was also the opening act for Justin Bieber, Armin Van Buuren, Martin Garrix, Steve Aoki, Axwell, Nicky Romero and others during their India tour.

Sartek has also had releases on international record labels such as Armada Music and Sony Music.

== Personal life ==
Sartek is a New Delhi native whose past preference of choice of career was becoming a Chartered accountant, for which he passed the main examinations. He has formerly served in corporations before pursuing music professionally and full-time.

== Discography ==
=== Singles ===
==== As lead artist ====
Title	Year	Album
"Apocalypse"	2013	Non-album single
"Dopamine"	2014	Non-album single
"Back to the Future"	2015	Non-album single
"Don't Need Love" (with Lucky Date)	2015	Non-album single
"I'm Trippin" (with Gregori Hawk)	2016	Non-album single
"Only You" (with Vigel)	2016	Non-album single
"My Addiction" (with Djerem)	2016	Non-album single
"Jump Right After You" (with Ale Q)	2017	Non-album single
Dil Ki Doya (with Nilayan)	2021	Non-album single
