= Sally (Hardwell song) =

Single by Hardwell featuring Harrison

from the album United We Are
- Released: 16 January 2015
- Genre: Electro house; rock
- Length: 4:38
- Label: Revealed; Cloud 9 Dance
- Songwriters: Robbert van de Corput; Harrison Shaw; Mark Maitland; Thomas Leithead-Docherty; Tom Frampton
- Producer: Hardwell

Hardwell singles chronology
"Eclipse" (2015)	"Sally" (2015)	"Echo" (2015)

Harrison singles chronology
"Ain't a Party" (2013)	"Sally" (2015)	"Mayday" (2015)

"Sally" is a song by Dutch DJ Hardwell. It features British singer Harrison. It is the fifth single from Hardwell's 2015 debut studio album United We Are.

== Background ==
Speaking about the term "Sally", Hardwell said "Sally is a term in the rock industry that (has) been used by the Beatles and Eric Clapton." The song was created as he announced his intentions to create a crossover song between EDM and rock.

== Charts ==
Chart (2015)	Peak position
Austria (Ö3 Austria Top 40)	33
Belgium (Ultratip Bubbling Under Flanders)	36
Germany (GfK)	60
Netherlands (Single Top 100)	56
