= United We Are =

Studio album by Hardwell
- Released: 23 January 2015
- Recorded: 2013–2015
- Genre: Electro house; progressive house; progressive trance
- Length: 53:20
- Label: Cloud 9; Revealed; Sony; Ultra
- Producer: Hardwell; Anakyn; Tiësto; Funkerman; W&W; Disco Fries; Bakker; Joey Dale; DallasK; Headhunterz

Hardwell chronology
United We Are (2015)	Rebels Never Die (2022)

Singles from United We Are
- 1. "Arcadia" Released: 7 July 2014; 2. "Young Again" Released: 17 October 2014; 3. "Don't Stop the Madness" Released: 22 December 2014; 4. "Eclipse" Released: 9 January 2015; 5. "Sally" Released: 16 January 2015; 6. "Echo" Released: 20 April 2015; 7. "Follow Me" Released: 7 August 2015

United We Are is the debut studio album by Dutch DJ and record producer Hardwell. It was released on 23 January 2015 by Cloud 9 Music, Revealed Recordings, Sony Music and Ultra Music.

== Singles ==
"Young Again" was released as the lead single from the album on 17 October 2014. The song reached number 23 on the Single Top 100 chart in the Netherlands, entered the tipparade of the Belgian Singles Chart, it also charted in Austria.

== Track listing ==
No.	Title	Writer(s)	Producer(s)	Length
1.	"Eclipse"	Robbert van de Corput	Hardwell	3:12
2.	"Follow Me" (featuring Jason Derulo)	Corput; James 'JHart' Abrahart; Jason Desrouleaux; Djibril Gibson Kagni; Jordan "Trackstorm" Houyez; Dino "SIRIUS" Cirone	Hardwell	3:19
3.	"Sally" (featuring Harrison)	Corput; Harrison Shaw; Mark Maitland; Thomas Leithead-Docherty; Tom Frampton	Hardwell; Anakyn^{[a]}	4:38
4.	"Let Me Be Your Home" (featuring Bright Lights)	Corput; Heather Bright	Hardwell	3:35
5.	"Colors" (with Tiësto featuring Andreas Moe)	Corput; Tijs Verwest; Andreas Moe; Manuel Reuter; Curtis Richa	Tiësto; Hardwell	4:00
6.	"Where Is Here Now" (with Funkerman featuring I-Fan)	Corput; Ardie van Beek; Raf Jansen; Ivan Perotti	Hardwell; Funkerman	3:15
7.	"United We Are" (featuring Amba Shepherd)	Corput; Amba Shepherd	Hardwell	5:51
8.	"Don't Stop the Madness" (with W&W featuring Fatman Scoop)	Corput; Willem van Hanegem; Wardt van der Harst; Isaac Freeman; Danny Boselovic; Nick Ditri	Hardwell; W&W; Disco Fries	3:45
9.	"Young Again" (featuring Chris Jones)	Corput; Chris Jones; Willem Bakker	Hardwell; Bakker^{[b]}	3:39
10.	"Echo" (featuring Jonathan Mendelsohn)	Corput; Jonathan Mendelsohn; Cory Brunwasser	Hardwell	5:08
11.	"Arcadia" (with Joey Dale featuring Luciana)	Corput; Joey Daleboudt; Luciana Caporaso; Nick Clow	Hardwell; Joey Dale	3:13
12.	"Area 51" (with DallasK)	Corput; Dallas Koehlke	Hardwell; DallasK	3:00
13.	"Nothing Can Hold Us Down" (with Headhunterz featuring Haris)	Corput; Willem Rebergen; Haris Alagic; Azra Alagic	Hardwell; Headhunterz	3:18
14.	"Birds Fly" (featuring Mr Probz)	Corput; Dennis Stehr; G. Early; B.S. Issac; P.R. Hamilton	Hardwell	3:27

iTunes bonus track
No.	Title	Writer(s)	Producer(s)	Length
15.	"Dare You (Acoustic Version)" (with Bebe Rexha featuring Matthew Koma)	Corput; Matthew Koma	Hardwell	3:06

Japan bonus tracks
No.	Title	Length
15.	"Arcadia (Thomas Newson Remix)" (with Joey Dale featuring Luciana)	4:40
16.	"Jumper" (with W&W)	5:14
17.	"Dare You" (featuring Matthew Koma)	3:38

Beatport deluxe edition
No.	Title	Length
1.	"Eclipse (Extended Mix)"	3:01
2.	"Follow Me (Club Mix)" (featuring Jason Derulo)	5:26
3.	"Sally (Album Version)" (featuring Harrison)	4:37
4.	"Let Me Be Your Home (Album Version)" (featuring Bright Lights)	3:35
5.	"Colors (Extended Mix)" (with Tiësto featuring Andreas Moe)	5:07
6.	"Where Is Here Now? (Album Version)" (with Funkerman featuring I-Fan)	3:15
7.	"United We Are (Extended Mix)" (featuring Amba Shepherd)	5:43
8.	"Don't Stop the Madness (Album Extended Mix)" (with W&W featuring Fatman Scoop)	4:59
9.	"Young Again (Extended Mix)" (featuring Chris Jones)	5:10
10.	"Echo (Extended Mix)" (featuring Jonathan Mendelsohn)	6:06
11.	"Arcadia (Extended Mix)" (with Joey Dale featuring Luciana)	4:58
12.	"Area51 (Extended Mix)" (with DallasK)	3:43
13.	"Nothing Can Hold Us Down (Extended Mix)" (with Headhunterz featuring Haris)	4:00
14.	"Birds Fly (Album Version)" (featuring Mr Probz)	3:27

Notes

- ^{^[a]} signifies original production
- ^{^[b]} signifies additional vocal production

== Charts ==
=== Weekly charts ===
Chart (2015)	Peak position
Australian Albums (ARIA)	41
Austrian Albums (Ö3 Austria)	6
Belgian Albums (Ultratop Flanders)	13
Belgian Albums (Ultratop Wallonia)	27
Dutch Albums (Album Top 100)	1
German Albums (Offizielle Top 100)	11
Hungarian Albums (MAHASZ)	39
Irish Albums (IRMA)	84
Italian Albums (FIMI)	42
Japanese Albums (Oricon)	71
Portuguese Albums (AFP)	10
Scottish Albums (OCC)	37
Spanish Albums (Promusicae)	72
Swedish Albums (Sverigetopplistan)	35
Swiss Albums (Schweizer Hitparade)	4
UK Albums (OCC)	83
US Billboard 200	85
US Top Dance Albums (Billboard)	2
US Independent Albums (Billboard)	10

=== Year-end charts ===
Chart (2015)	Position
Belgian Albums (Ultratop Flanders)	156
Dutch Albums (Album Top 100)	22

== Certifications ==
Region	Certification	Certified units/sales
Netherlands (NVPI)	Gold	20,000^{^}
^{^} Shipments figures based on certification alone.

== Release history ==
Region	Date	Format	Label
Netherlands	23 January 2015	CD; digital download	Cloud 9
United Kingdom	23 January 2015	CD; digital download	Sony UK
Canada	23 January 2015	CD; digital download	Ultra
United States	23 January 2015	CD; digital download	Ultra
Germany	23 January 2015	CD; digital download	Cloud 9; Kontor
France	23 January 2015	CD; digital download	Scorpio
Japan	23 January 2015	CD; digital download	Avex International
