= Countdown (Hardwell and MAKJ song) =

Single by Hardwell and MAKJ
- Released: 7 October 2013
- Genre: Big room house
- Length: 4:38
- Label: Revealed; Cloud 9 Dance
- Songwriter(s): Robbert van de Corput: Eric Pierre Francois Bonnast; Iane Robbertson; Spike Shurakano; Mackenzie Johnson
- Producer(s): Hardwell; MAKJ

Hardwell singles chronology
"Jumper" (2013)	"Countdown" (2013)	"Dare You" (2013)

MAKJ singles chronology
"Revolution" (2013)	"Countdown" (2013)	"Encore" (2013)

"Countdown" is a song by DJs and producers Hardwell and MAKJ.

== Background ==
In September 2013, a teaser was posted by Revealed Recordings for the song. The song was remixed by Micetro and Bamboora.

== Track listing ==
No.	Title	Length
1.	"Countdown"	4:38

== Charts ==
Chart (2013)	Peak position
Belgium (Ultratop 50 Flanders)	28
Netherlands (Single Top 100)	41
Dance/Electronic Digital Songs Sales (Billboard)	42
Dance Club Songs (Billboard)	49
Hot Dance/Electronic Songs (Billboard)	42
