= Jumper (Hardwell and W&W song) =

Single by Hardwell and W&W
- Released: 5 August 2013
- Genre: Big room house
- Length: 5:12 (Original Mix) 2:58 (Radio Edit)
- Label: Revealed; Cloud 9 Dance
- Songwriters: Robbert van de Corput; Willem van der Haegen; Wardt van der Harst
- Producers: Hardwell; W&W

Hardwell singles chronology
"Never Say Goodbye" (2013)	"Jumper" (2013)	"Countdown" (2013)

W&W singles chronology
"D# Fat" (2013)	"Jumper" (2013)	"Bigfoot" (2014)

"Jumper" is a song by Dutch DJs Hardwell and W&W.

== Background ==
Hardwell premiered the song at the 2013 Ultra Music Festival during his set in Miami.

== Track listing ==
No.	Title	Length
1.	"Jumper"	5:12
2.	"Jumper (Radio Edit)"	2:58

== Charts ==
Chart (2013)	Peak position
France (SNEP)	141
Dance/Electronic Digital Songs Sales (Billboard)	50
