= Eclipse (Hardwell song) =

Single by Hardwell

from the album United We Are
- Released: 9 January 2015
- Recorded: 2014
- Genre: Big room house
- Length: 3:12
- Label: Revealed; Cloud 9 Dance
- Songwriter(s): Robbert van de Corput
- Producer(s): Hardwell

Hardwell singles chronology
"Don't Stop the Madness" (2014)	"Eclipse" (2015)	"Sally" (2015)

"Eclipse" is a song by Dutch DJ Hardwell. It is the opening song and the fourth single from his 2015 debut studio album United We Are.

== Background ==
Hardwell regularly played the song in his Ultra Music Festival sets since 2014 as the opening song.

== Charts ==
Chart (2015)	Peak position
Austria (Ö3 Austria Top 40)	34
