= Echo (Hardwell song) =

Single by Hardwell featuring Jonathan Mendelsohn

from the album United We Are
- Released: 20 April 2015
- Genre: Big room trance
- Length: 5:08
- Label: Revealed; Cloud 9 Dance
- Songwriters: Robbert van de Corput; Jonathan Mendelsohn; Cory Brunwasser
- Producer: Hardwell

Hardwell singles chronology
"Sally" (2015)	"Echo" (2015)	"Follow Me" (2015)

Jonathan Mendelsohn singles chronology
"Follow the Light" (2014)	"Echo" (2015)	"This Time" (2015)

"Echo" is a song by Dutch DJ Hardwell. It features singer Jonathan Mendelsohn. It is the sixth single from Hardwell's 2015 debut studio album United We Are.

== Background ==
A music video, directed by Robin Piree and produced by Nadjim Tsouli and Alexander Nedyalkov, was released on 18 April 2015. The video presents an old man, who wandered through snow-covered mountains and his 'remorse over a lost love'. The song was described as a 'standout' track on the album.

== Track listing ==
No.	Title	Length
1.	"Echo"	5:08
2.	"Echo" (extended mix)	6:06

== Charts ==
Chart (2015)	Peak position
Belgium (Ultratip Bubbling Under Flanders)	29
