= Dare You =

Single by Hardwell featuring Matthew Koma

from the album Hardwell Presents Revealed Volume 5
- Released: 13 November 2013
- Genre: Progressive house
- Length: 3:38 (radio edit); 5:27 (extended mix)
- Label: Revealed; Cloud 9 Dance
- Songwriters: Robbert van de Corput; Matthew Bair
- Producer: Hardwell

Hardwell singles chronology
"Countdown" (2013)	"Dare You" (2013)	"Everybody Is in the Place" (2014)

Matthew Koma singles chronology
"Years" (2012)	"Dare You" (2013)	"Cannonball (Earthquake)" (2014)

"Dare You" is a song by Dutch DJ and record producer Hardwell. It features the vocals from Matthew Koma. It was released on 13 November 2013 and re-released on 5 January 2014 by Revealed Recordings. It entered the UK Singles Chart at number 18, making it the first Hardwell release to chart in the United Kingdom, in January 2014. An acoustic version featuring Koma and Bebe Rexha was released as an iTunes bonus track on Hardwell's debut studio album, United We Are in January 2015. Rexha only sings background vocals during the chorus.

== Music video ==
A music video to accompany the release of "Dare You" was first released onto YouTube on 5 January 2014 at a total length of three minutes and thirty-eight seconds.

== Track listing ==
Digital download
No.	Title	Length
1.	"Dare You" (radio edit)	3:38
2.	"Dare You" (extended mix)	5:27

The Remixes – Part 1
No.	Title	Length
1.	"Dare You" (Tiësto vs. Twoloud remix)	5:23
2.	"Dare You" (Cash Cash remix)	6:09

The Remixes – Part 2
No.	Title	Length
1.	"Dare You" (Tritonal remix)	6:14
2.	"Dare You" (Andrew Rayel remix)	6:56

== Charts ==
=== Weekly charts ===
Weekly chart performance for "Dare You"
Chart (2013–2014)	Peak position
Belgium (Ultratop 50 Flanders)	13
Belgium (Ultratop Flanders Dance)	10
Belgium (Ultratip Bubbling Under Wallonia)	15
Belgium (Ultratop Wallonia Dance)	25
Ireland (IRMA)	57
Netherlands (Dutch Top 40)	31
Netherlands (Single Top 100)	40
Netherlands (Dance Top 30)	11
Poland (Dance Top 50)	35
Scotland Singles (OCC)	5
UK Singles (OCC)	18
UK Dance (OCC)	6
US Hot Dance/Electronic Songs (Billboard)	16

=== Year-end charts ===
2013 year-end chart performance for "Dare You"
Chart (2013)	Position
Netherlands (Dutch Top 40)	196

2014 year-end chart performance for "Dare You"
Chart (2014)	Position
US Hot Dance/Electronic Songs (Billboard)	64
