= Young Again (Hardwell song) =

Single by Hardwell featuring Chris Jones

from the album United We Are
- Released: 17 October 2014
- Genre: Progressive house; electro house
- Length: 3:39
- Label: Revealed; Cloud 9 Dance
- Songwriters: Robbert van de Corput; Chris Jones; Willem Bakker
- Producers: Hardwell; Willem Bakker

Hardwell singles chronology
"Arcadia" (2014)	"Young Again" (2014)	"Don't Stop the Madness" (2014)

Chris Jones singles chronology
"So Lonely" (2014)	"Young Again" (2014)	"Make it Ours" (2015)

"Young Again" is a song by Dutch DJ Hardwell. It features singer Chris Jones. It is the second single from Hardwell's 2015 debut studio album United We Are.

== Background ==
A music video for the song was released.

== Track listing ==
No.	Title	Length
1.	"Young Again"	3:39
2.	"Young Again" (extended mix)	5:10

== Charts ==
Chart (2015)	Peak position
Austria (Ö3 Austria Top 40)	56
Belgium (Ultratip Bubbling Under Flanders)	18
Belgium (Ultratip Bubbling Under Wallonia)	21
France (SNEP)	180
Netherlands (Single Top 100)	23
Poland (Polish Airplay New)	3
US Dance Airplay (Billboard)	36
