= Apollo (Hardwell song) =

2012 single by Hardwell

Single by Hardwell featuring Amba Shepherd

from the album Hardwell Presents Revealed Volume 4
- Released: 10 December 2012
- Genre: Big room house
- Length: 3:29 (radio edit); 5:11 (extended mix)
- Label: Revealed; Cloud 9 Dance
- Songwriter(s): Robbert van de Corput; Amber Shepherd
- Producer(s): Hardwell

Hardwell singles chronology
"How We Do" (2012)	"Apollo" (2012)	"Never Say Goodbye" (2013)

Amba Shepherd singles chronology
"Superhuman" (2013)	"Apollo" (2013)	"Heaven or Hell" (2013)

"Apollo" is a song by Dutch producer and DJ Hardwell. It features vocals from Australian singer and songwriter Amba Shepherd. It is the first single from Hardwell's compilation, Hardwell Presents Revealed Volume 4.

== Background ==
Upon receiving three million followers on Facebook, Hardwell released a private edit of the song for free to celebrate. An acoustic version of the song was released. The song was certified platinum by the NVPI. A remixes EP was released, featuring remixes from Dash Berlin, Noisecontrollers, Lucky Date and Psychic Type.

== Track listing ==
Single
No.	Title	Length
1.	"Apollo"	5:11
2.	"Apollo" (radio edit)	3:29

Remixes EP
No.	Title	Length
1.	"Apollo" (Dash Berlin 4AM remix)	5:18
2.	"Apollo" (Noisecontrollers remix)	5:24
3.	"Apollo" (Lucky Date remix)	4:37
4.	"Apollo" (Psychic Type remix)	6:12
5.	"Apollo" (Dr Phunk Hardstyle remix)	3:42

== Charts ==
=== Weekly charts ===
Weekly chart performance for "Apollo"
Chart (2012–13)	Peak position
Austria (Ö3 Austria Top 40)	71
Belgium (Ultratip Bubbling Under Flanders)	21
Belgium (Ultratip Bubbling Under Wallonia)	18
France (SNEP)	70
Netherlands (Dutch Top 40)	26
Netherlands (Single Top 100)	46
Netherlands (Dance Top 30)	7
US Hot Dance/Electronic Songs (Billboard)	23

=== Year-end charts ===
2013 year-end chart performance for "Apollo"
Chart (2013)	Position
France (SNEP)	200
Netherlands (Dutch Top 40)	141
US Hot Dance/Electronic Songs (Billboard)	62
