= Mad World (Hardwell song) =

2015 single by Hardwell ft. Jake Reese

Single by Hardwell featuring Jake Reese
- Released: 16 October 2015
- Genre: Progressive house; dance-pop
- Length: 4:26
- Label: Revealed; Cloud 9 Dance
- Songwriter(s): Robbert van de Corput; Jaap Reesema; Andrew Harr; Jermaine Jackson; Joren van der Voort; Klaas Pels
- Producer(s): Hardwell

Hardwell singles chronology
| "Off the Hook" (2015) | "Mad World" (2015) | "Run Wild" (2016) |

"Mad World" is a song by Dutch DJ and music producer Hardwell. It features Dutch singer and songwriter Jake Reese.

== Background ==
The song was premiered by Hardwell at Ultra Music Festival. It is the 200th release of Hardwell's label Revealed Recordings. A contest was set up for fans to remix the song. An official music video was released on 16 October 2015. The song was featured on Hardwell's United We Are remix album.

== Track listing ==
Singles
| No. | Title | Length |
|---|---|---|
| 1. | "Mad World" | 4:26 |
| 2. | "Mad World" (radio edit) | 3:30 |

Remixes
| No. | Title | Length |
|---|---|---|
| 1. | "Mad World" (Quintino Remix) | 4:10 |
| 2. | "Mad World" (Moksi Remix) | 4:09 |
| 3. | "Mad World" (Sephyx Remix) | 5:05 |
| 4. | "Mad World" (Olly James & Ryan & Vin Remix) | 4:46 |
| 5. | "Mad World" (REEZ & DIVARO Remix) | 4:10 |
| 6. | "Mad World" (acoustic version) | 2:49 |

== Charts ==
| Chart (2015–16) | Peak position |
|---|---|
| Belgium (Ultratip Bubbling Under Flanders) | 37 |
| Belgium (Ultratip Bubbling Under Wallonia) | 18 |
| France (SNEP) | 117 |
| Netherlands (Single Top 100) | 78 |
