= Jewelz & Sparks =

German DJ and music production duo

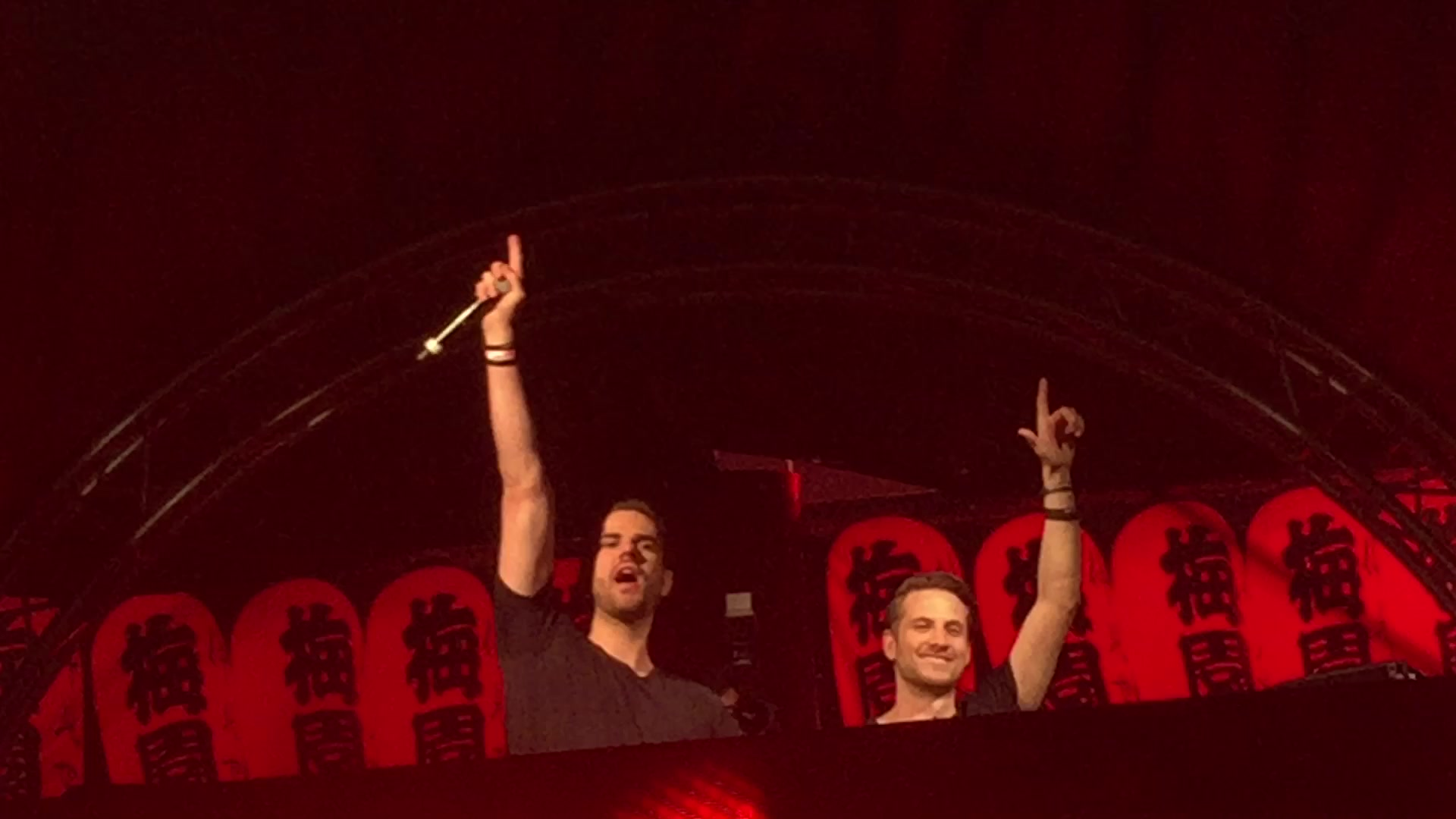
- Jewelz & Sparks live at Airbeat One 2016 in Germany

Background information
- Born: Julius Voigtländer; Gregor Brechmann
- Origin: Heidelberg and Mannheim, Germany
- Genres: EDM; Electro house; Big room house; House; Progressive techno; Minimal techno
- Years active: 2011–present
- Labels: Revealed; Spinnin'; DOORN (Spinnin); Maxximize; Dim Mak; Ultra; Flamingo
- Members: Julius Voigtländer (Jewelz); Gregor Brechmann (Scott Sparks)
- Website: www.jewelzandsparks.com

Jewelz & Sparks are a German DJ and music production duo consisting of Julius Voigtländer (born 1984) and Gregor Brechmann (born 1991) that formed in 2011, and they are one of the most successful German EDM projects.

The duo is best known for their collaboration with Quilla on the single "Unless We Forget", released on Revealed Recordings in January 2014 and "Pharaoh", released a few months later.

== Biography ==
=== 2012: Founding ===
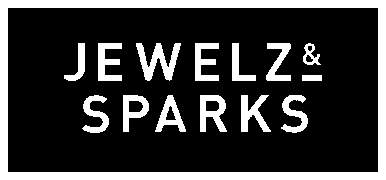
Jewelz & Sparks' official logo

Even before merging, both musicians were active as DJs and producers. Jewelz, with Josh the Funky 1, released a remix of "The Groove" on Groovebox 2008. A year later he appeared along with Meesh on the single "If U Luv Me". Scott Sparks was active on Straight Line Records, releasing his debut single "Insane" in 2011.

They met while studying music production and business at the Popakademie Baden-Württemberg. Although they did not go in the same class, but learned to know each other because of their same musical taste. In addition, both produced their music in a similar way. After their meeting, they decided to start a first collaboration. The duo said that they developed their ideas via Skype and continued or run these by reference into their Dropbox saved file. After that, they began making a song but only if they both are together in their studio.

=== 2013: Initial successes with "Toxic Rush" & "Flashbang" ===
Shortly after coming together to start as a duo, their official first single "Toxic Rush", was released in September 2012 through Fedde Le Grand's label Flamingo Recordings and also through Beatport. "Toxic Rush" became a surprise success. The single was supported by among others David Guetta, Tiësto and Hardwell, who played the Big Room song in their sets and their podcasts. Furthermore, they followed multiple queries on appearances and recording contracts. In December 2012, their second single "Flashbang" followed.

In 2013, they started with the single "NYMSN". The title is a sequence of the initial letters of the words "New York make some noise," representing the Shout for inserting the drops. However, the release did not take place, as the first two tracks on Flamingo, but on MYNC's label Cr2 Records. The connection to the known label was also formed by Le Grand, who can also boast a number of releases on Cr2 Records. During the year, the release of the double single "Hot Rod / White Sun" and the track "Cargo" followed.

On 7 December 2013 they played at the Ministry of Sound festival in the United Kingdom, until then their biggest show.

=== 2014: Commercial success and appearances as headliners ===
On 13 January 2014 the duo released their first progressive house single, "Unless We Forget", with Canadian singer Quilla. The song was released on a Hardwell's label Revealed Recordings. The single was played by major festivals, such as the Ultra Music Festival and at the Tomorrowland. In April 2014, a remix by Dutch DJ Julian Calor charted, at the same time that they released their next single, "Pharaoh", through Revealed.

Their next single, "Kingdom", was released on 2 June 2014 through Sander van Doorn's label Doorn Records. As co-producer they worked with the German producer Virtual Riot. "Dope" was the title of successor single, which was released just three weeks later. This made a return to Flamingo Recordings. For the Be Yourself Music compilation, which appeared in the wake of sensational festival, they mixed the track again from new.

On 12 July 2014 they appeared together on the main stage of the Ultra Music Festival in Croatia, which was their largest concert, and later at the Ministry of Sound. Furthermore, they were headliners at the World Club Dome in Frankfurt, when Airbeat One on in Neustadt Glewe and also in the Billboard Club in Melbourne. They also completed a tour that took place around the globe. Stopovers were among others in Singapore. They also completed a tour that took place around the globe. Stopovers were among others in Singapore, Japan and also in the United States.

In late summer to autumn 2014 a double single "Phantom & Reptile" was released on Steve Aoki's label Dim Mak and "Motor" through Calvin Harris' label Fly Eye Records.

=== 2015–2016: "I Can Fly" and "Hoe" ===
On 16 March 2015 Jewelz & Sparks' first collaboration "Robotic" together with Fedde Le Grand was released. This continues to represent the area of Big rooms and the duo brought since the summer of 2014 for the first time in the Beatport top 20. The single was released through Le Grand's label Darklight Recordings, which was established in January 2015. Just one month later, the release of "Parade 98", which break a blend of modern vocal cuts and retro-tinged tech house elements there and is listening a shift to their typical Big Room style drop. The video is based on old rave record and should also act on absurd but at the same funny to the audience.

On 28 September 2015 Jewelz & Sparks released "Mental" through Le Grand's label Darklight Records. Their next single "I Can Fly", was released on 30 November 2015 through Tiësto's label Musical Freedom and was Jewelz & Sparks' first Beatport Top 10 hit and the first number one in the genre charts. As co-producer they worked again with Virtual Riot. "Drip" was released in March 2016 on Blasterjaxx' label Maxximize Records. In an interview, they announced that they intend to collaborate more in the future. Their next single, "Hoe", a collaboration with D.O.D, was released on 18 April 2016. While it was considered at first of which, that the "Hoe" refers to the English word for "whore", it soon became clear that it is the involvement of the fans with the exclamations "Hey, hoe" during a performance.

== Discography ==
=== Singles ===
- 2012: Toxic Rush [Flamingo]
- 2012: Flashbang [Flamingo]
- 2013: NYMSN [Cr2]
- 2013: Hot Rod / White Sun [Flamingo]
- 2013: Cargo [Cr2]
- 2014: Unless We Forget (featuring Quilla) [Revealed]
- 2014: Pharaoh [Revealed]
- 2014: Kingdom [Doorn (Spinnin')]
- 2014: Dope [Flamingo]
- 2014: Phantom & Reptile [Dim Mak]
- 2014: Motor [Fly Eye]
- 2015: Robotic (with Fedde Le Grand) [Darklight Recordings]
- 2015: Parade 98 [Fly Eye]
- 2015: Mental [Darklight Recordings]
- 2015: I Can Fly [Musical Freedom]
- 2016: Drip [Maxximize (Spinnin')]
- 2016: Hoe (with D.O.D) [Doorn (Spinnin')]
- 2016: Need You [Spinnup]
- 2016: Parallel Lines [Spinnup]
- 2016: Who's Your Daddy [Spinnup]
- 2016: Money Maker [Spinnup]
- 2016: Into The Blue (with Sarazar featuring Pearl Andersson) [Warner Music Germany]
- 2016: Hide & Seek [Spinnup]
- 2016: Crank [Revealed Recordings]
- 2017: Grande Opera [Revealed Recordings]
- 2017: Flying High [Spinnup]
- 2017: Parallel Lines (featuring Catze) [Revealed Recordings]
- 2017: Echoes Of Us (featuring Jess Thristan) [Sony Music Germany]
- 2017: Shuriken [Spinnup]
- 2018: Safari (with Hardwell) [Revealed Recordings]
- 2018: All I See Is You (DJ Afrojack Edit) (featuring Pearl Andersson) [Revealed Recordings]
- 2018: One More Day (with Afrojack) [Wall (Armada)]
- 2018: The Moment (with Afrojack as AJXJS) [Wall (Armada)]
- 2018: When You're Gone (Afrojack featuring Jewelz & Sparks and Ester Dean) [Wall (Armada)]
- 2018: Reaction (with Sick Individuals) [Revealed Recordings]
- 2019: Hard [Spinnin' Records]
- 2019: Switch (with Afrojack featuring Emmalyn) [Wall (Armada)]
- 2019: Gucci Moves [Wall Recordings]
- 2019: El Toro [Spinnup]
- 2020: Up In The Air [Spinnin']
- 2020: Django [Spinnin']
- 2020: Rise (with Ferdinand Feller featuring Odblu) [Self-released]
- 2020: Traffic [Musical Freedom]
- 2020: Wherever You Go (featuring Violetta Zironi) [Self-released]
- 2021: Told You (with Lion) [Skink]
- 2021: If You Want Me [Skink]
- 2021: Take Me Away (with Futuristic Polar Bears featuring Carly Lyn) [Maxximise]
- 2022: Lost

=== Remixes ===
- 2014: Benny Benassi, The Biz - Satisfaction (Jewelz & Scott Sparks Remix) [d:vision records]
- 2014: Fedde Le Grand - Rockin' N' Rollin' (Jewelz & Scott Sparks Tomahawk Mix) [Musicheads Electro]
- 2015: Shermanology, Dannic - Wait For You (Jewelz & Sparks Remix) [Revealed Recordings]
- 2016: Joey Beltram - Together (Jewelz & Sparks Remix) [Halcyon]
- 2017: The Chainsmokers - Paris (Jewelz & Sparks Remix) [Disruptor/Columbia]
- 2017: Laidback Luke and Made In June featuring Bright Lights - Paradise (Jewelz & Sparks Remix) [Dim Mak]
- 2019: Galantis and Dolly Parton featuring Mr. Probz - Faith (Jewelz & Sparks Remix) [Atlantic]
