= Joey Dale =

Dutch DJ (born 1993)

- Born: Joey Daleboudt; 1 July 1993 (age 33); Rotterdam, South Holland, Netherlands
- Genres: Dutch house; electro house; progressive house
- Occupations: DJ; record producer; musician
- Instruments: Keyboard; guitar; synthesizer; FL Studio
- Years active: 2008–present
- Labels: Revealed; Spinnin'; Dim Mak
- Website: joeydalemusic.com

Joey Daleboudt (born 1 July 1993), better known by his stage name Joey Dale, is a Dutch DJ, record producer and musician.

The majority of his releases are on Hardwell's label Revealed Recordings.

== Career ==
In 2014, Dale collaborated with Dutch DJ Hardwell to release the song "Arcadia" which charted in Belgium and France. In 2015, he released "Winds" with Rico & Miella. In 2016, he collaborated with American producer Ryos to release the song "Armageddon" featuring singer/songwriter Tony Rodini via Revealed Recordings. He also released "Crowd Control" with Pitchback and "Lights Out" with Quintino.

== Discography ==
=== Singles ===
==== Charting singles ====
Singles that have charted on one or more national chart(s).
Year	Title	Peak chart positions												Album
Year	Title	NLD	AUS	AUT	BEL (Vl)	BEL (Wa)	FIN	FRA	GER	IRL	SWE	SWI	UK	Album
2014	"Arcadia" (with Hardwell)	—	—	—	75^{[A]}	35^{[B]}	—	166	—	—	—	—	—	United We Are
2014	"Ready for Action" (with Alvaro)	—	—	—	18^{[C]}	—	—	—	—	—	—	—	—	Non-album single
"—" denotes a recording that did not chart or was not released in that territory.

=== Other singles ===
- 2013: Cracked [Oxygen (Spinnin')]
- 2013: POING! (with Justin Prime) (Original Mix) [Dim Mak Records]
- 2014: Ready for Action (with Alvaro) [Spinnin Records]
- 2014: Shockwave [Revealed Recordings]
- 2014: Watcha Called Me [Revealed Recordings]
- 2014: About the Drop Out [Revealed Recordings]
- 2014: Arcadia (with Hardwell) [Revealed Recordings]
- 2014: Step Into Your Light (featuring Natalie Angiuli) (with Ares Carter) [Zouk Recordings (Armada)]
- 2014: Deja Vu (featuring Delora) (with Dvbbs) [Spinnin Records]
- 2014: Access Denied [Doorn (Spinnin)]
- 2015: Gladiator [Revealed Recordings]
- 2015: Zodiac [Revealed Recordings]
- 2015: Haunted House [Revealed Recordings]
- 2015: The Harder They Fall [Revealed Recordings]
- 2015: Timecode (with Thomas Newson) [Revealed Recordings]
- 2015: Winds (with Rico & Miella) [Revealed Recordings]
- 2015: Epsilon [Revealed Recordings]
- 2016: Where Dreams Are Made (featuring Monstere) [Revealed Recordings]
- 2016: Long Way Home (with Paris & Simo and Brandon Lethi) [Revealed Recordings]
- 2016: Lights Out (with Quintino and Channi Monroe) [Spinnin Records]
- 2016: "Makes Me Wonder" (with Reece Low) [Armada Trice]
- 2016: "Armageddon" (with Ryos and Tony Rodini) [Revealed Recordings]
- 2016: "Everest" (with Ravitez) [Wall Recordings]
- 2016: "Higher" (with Olly James) [Revealed Recordings]
- 2016: "Crowd Control" (with Pitchback) [Revealed Recordings]
- 2016: "Shake It" (with Maddix) [Revealed Recordings]
- 2017: "Rogue Ones" (with Adventurer and Micah Martin) [Revealed Recordings]
- 2017: "Show Me" [Mixmash Deep]
- 2017: "Taking Me Home" (with Anthony Dircson featuring Kennedy Ihaka) [Houston, Taxes]
- 2017: "Under My Sheets" (with Rico & Miella) [Joey Dale Music]
- 2017: "Black Sahara" (with Kaaze featuring Aloma Steele) [Revealed Recordings]
- 2018: "All In My Head" (with Luca Testa featuring Phillip Matta) [Maxximize]

=== Remixes ===
- 2015: Swanky Tunes, C. Todd Nielsen - Fire In Our Hearts (Joey Dale Remix) [Revealed Recordings]
