= Amba Shepherd =

Australian singer-songwriter (born 1991)

- Born: Amber Louise Shepherd; 18 May 1991 (age 35); Sydney, Australia
- Genres: House; dance
- Occupations: Singer; songwriter
- Instrument: Vocals
- Years active: 2010–present
- Website: Official website

Amber Louise Shepherd, better known by her stage name Amba Shepherd is an Australian singer and songwriter, best known for her collaborations with the Dutch music producer, Hardwell. Amba Shepherd was named "The most relevant guest vocalist in EDM" by Elektro Mag June 2013 and "The number one voice on today's dance floor" by DMC World. Her collaboration with Hardwell on the track "Apollo" held the number one position on the Beatport Top 100.

Shepherd comes from a musical family in Sydney.

== Discography ==
As lead artist

- 2016: "Prelude [Rest in Peace]"
- 2017: "Wide Awake & Dreaming"
- 2017: "If I Could"
- 2018: "Fall"
- 2018: "Body Language"
- 2018: "Away"
- 2019: "Off the Grid" (with EDX)
- 2019: "Something Beautiful"
- 2019: "Fly Away"
- 2019: "Come Closer"
- 2020: "Over the Sun" (with Nø Signe)
- 2021: "Halo of Hope"
- 2021: "Wild & Free"
- 2022: "Back for More"
- 2022: "Catch Me" (with KNNDY)
- 2022: "Ready 4 Your Love"

As featured artist

- 2010: "More Physical" (with Victor Ark)
- 2010: "I Believe" (with Nick Galea)
- 2011: "Vandalism" (with Porter Robinson)
- 2011: "Man on the Run" (with Suae & Pulsar)
- 2012: "Lost for Words" (with Giuseppe Ottaviani)
- 2012: "Sky High" (with Dyro)
- 2012: "Perfect Crime" (with Joan Reyes and Heren)
- 2012: "Superhuman" (with Virtual Riot)
- 2012: "Apollo" (with Hardwell)
- 2012: "Heaven Or Hell" (with Guy Robin)
- 2012: "Cupid's Casualty" (with Mark Sixma)
- 2013: "Let the Love" (with Starkillers and Dmitry Ko)
- 2013: "Finally" (with Mikkas)
- 2013: "Haunting Me" (with Suae & Pulsar)
- 2013: "Let It Out" (with Jono Fernandez and Pauls Paris)
- 2013: "Not Too Late" (with Tom Swoon)
- 2013: "Who We Are" (with Shermanology)
- 2014: "Real Life" (with Tst and Moguai)
- 2014: "Rewind" (with Fake Forward)
- 2015: "United We Are" (with Hardwell)
- 2015: "Did We Forget" (with Nervo)
- 2015: "The Way Out" (with Deniz Koyu)
- 2015: "Neon Sunrise" (with Laidback Luke featuring Benny Benassi)
- 2016: "U Are" (with Paul Oakenfold)
- 2019: "Dynamite" (with Nicky Romero and Mike Williams)
- 2020: "Smells Like Teen Spirit" (with R3hab)
- 2020: "Heads or Tails" (with Quix)

As songwriter

- 2007: "Nu Love" (performed by Slinkee Minx)
