= W&W =

Dutch DJ duo

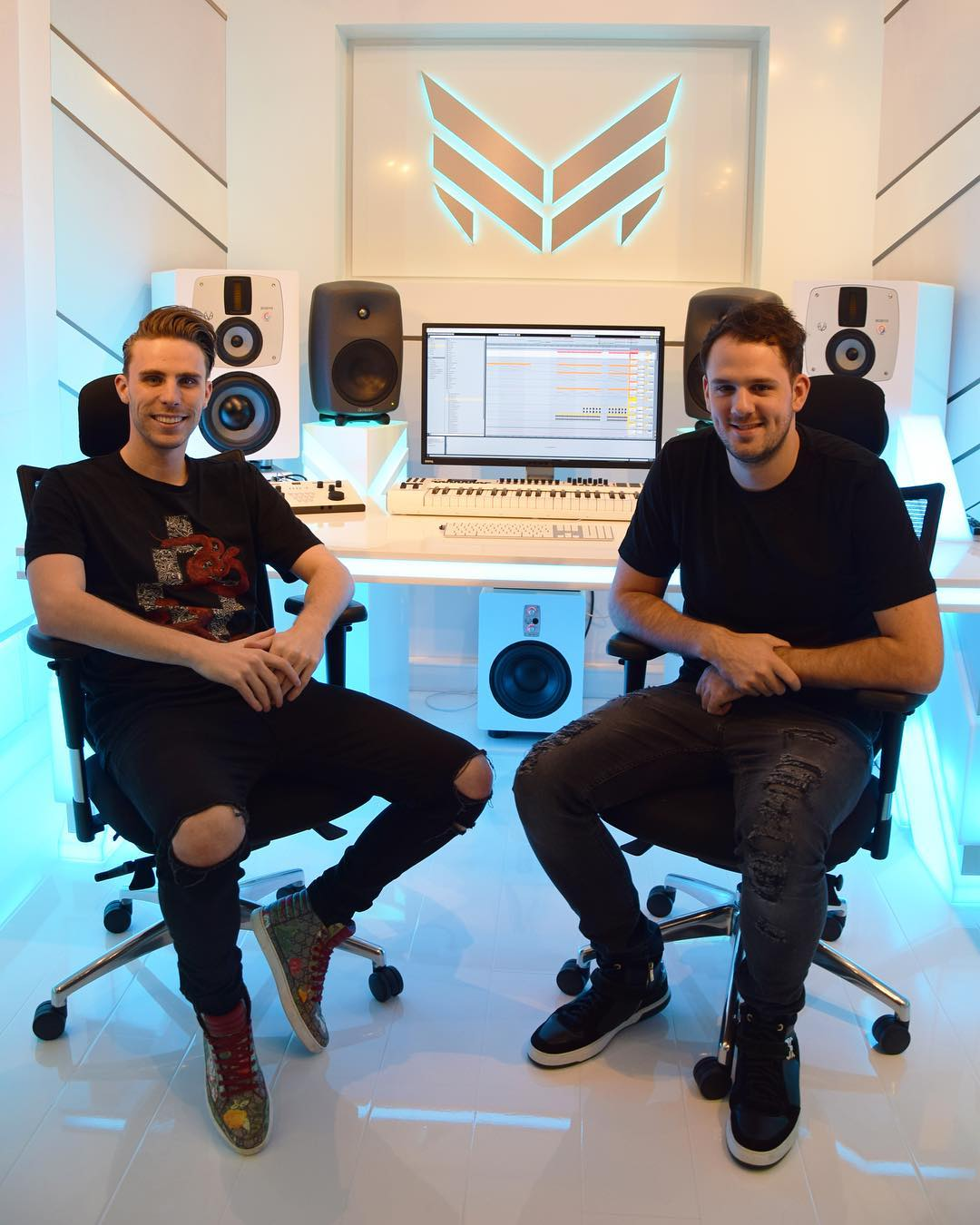
- Willem van Hanegem Jr. (left) and Wardt van der Harst (right) in 2017

Background information
- Also known as: NWYR
- Origin: Breda, Netherlands
- Genres: Progressive trance; Dutch house; big room house; trance; psy-trance; trap; hardstyle; happy hardcore
- Years active: 2007–present
- Labels: Armada; Mainstage; Rave Culture; Revealed; Spinnin'; Doorn; Musical Freedom; Aropa; Smash the House; Ultra Records
- Members: Willem van Hanegem Jr.; Wardt van der Harst
- Website: wandwmusic.com

W&W (stylized as Ш&Ш) is a Dutch DJ and record production duo composed of Willem van Hanegem Jr. (Dutch: [ˈʋɪləɱ vɑn ˈɦaːnəɣɛm]) and Wardt van der Harst (Dutch: [ˈʋɑrt fɑn dər ˈɦɑrst]). They began their careers by producing trance music, before venturing into big room house and other forms of EDM.

After producing trance for five years, W&W founded their own record label called Mainstage Music, and became active in the big room house scene. This was followed by the release of their commercial breakthrough "Bigfoot" in 2014. In 2017, they returned to their original trance style with the NWYR (pronounced "new year") project. Their record label Mainstage changed its name to Rave Culture at the end of 2018, focusing on a wider variety of genres.

== History ==
=== 2007–2012: Trance releases and Mainstage Music label ===
Willem van Hanegem and Wardt van der Harst began to build an interest in trance music while in their youths. The duo first met through Windows Live Messenger, which they used to share their song productions with one another. After their first successes as solo producers, the two DJs began to build a friendship and met at the Trance Energy 2007 Festival in the Netherlands. The track "Mustang", which appeared at the same year, became a success and was played by Armin van Buuren and Tiësto in their sets. On the basis of van der Harst's recording contract, Armada Music released the song as a single on 7 July 2008. Within a short time, the track achieved popularity on several forums and music platforms. In 2011, they made their first appearance on DJ Mag's Top 100 DJs list when they reached the 36th place.

During the next few years, W&W had numerous single releases and appearances at trance festivals. W&W released their debut album, Impact, on 23 September 2011. They founded their record label named Mainstage Music, as a sub-label of Armada Music in April 2012, based on the name of one of their most successful tracks as of that date. Alongside W&W's own works, the label publishes singles produced by other artists such as Armin van Buuren, Andrew Rayel and Sick Individuals. The duo hosts a bi-weekly radio show under the Mainstage Music moniker.

In 2012 they published the single "Invasion", which was chosen as the A State of Trance 550 Anthem. That same year they remixed "Waiting" by Dash Berlin featuring Emma Hewitt, and the Delerium classic "Silence" together with Jonas Stenberg.

=== 2013: From trance to big room house ===
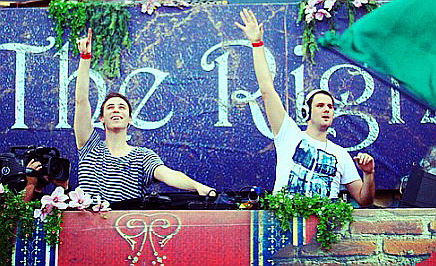
W&W at TomorrowWorld Festival 2013

On 3 December 2012, the duo released the single "Lift Off!" which showcased elements corresponding more to the popular big room genre, by mixing trance and electro house elements together. Shortly thereafter, they officially announced their move to the big room house scene. "Lift Off!" reached #82 on the Dutch Top 100 Singles charts. This song attracted the attention of Dutch DJ Hardwell, who took them to his record label Revealed Recordings to release "Trigger" and "The Code", the former produced with Marcel Woods and the latter of which was produced with Ummet Ozcan. "The Code" was initially heard on Hardwell's BBC 1 Essential Mix, and it became ranked first on multiple Beatport charts. Both for W&W and Ozcan, "The Code" became their first song to reach #1 in Beatport.

"D# Fat", released on 25 February 2013, was a collaboration with Dutch DJ Armin van Buuren and a crossover between W&W's old trance style and their new big room style. The track reached #2 on the Beatport Top 100 charts. As a celebration for reaching 100,000 likes on Mainstage Music's Facebook page, W&W gave away "Ghost Town" as a free download on 4 March 2014. At the same time, they worked together with van Buuren to remix his single "This Is What It Feels Like" as a single release. The duo's next production, "Thunder", appeared on 20 May 2013. The track embodied much of the same sound as the van Buuren remix, and reached #2 on the Beatport Top 100 charts. On 27 July 2013, they performed for the first time at the mainstage of the Tomorrowland Festival in Belgium and advanced into the top 20 of the DJ Mag's Top 100 DJ's list.

On 5 August 2013, W&W's collaboration with Hardwell was unveiled under the title "Jumper". The track was debuted at the 2013 Ultra Music Festival in Miami by both Hardwell and W&W, and it peaked Beatport charts.

W&W also worked along with Armin van Buuren in his remix of "Love Never Came" featuring Richard Bedford, a track that belongs to the album Intense by the Dutch artist. The remix was included in the remixes album Intense: The More Intense Edition. That year W&W also remixed "Live for the Night" by Krewella.

=== 2014: Commercial breakthrough with "Bigfoot" ===
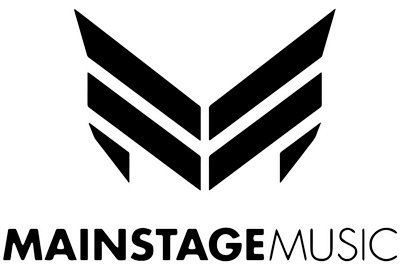
Logo of their record label "Mainstage Music"

In the spring of 2014, initial previews of their track "Bigfoot" started to appear. The song featured a prominent big room sound. "Bigfoot" was well received, and soon developed into one of their most successful singles, charting in Germany, Switzerland and France. Later in 2014 an EP was released with "Bigfoot" remixes by Dillon Francis, LNY TNZ and GirlsLoveDJs & Praia Del Sol, which enjoyed some popularity.

On 24 February 2014, they released their remix of "U" by Gareth Emery, reaching the 6th position of the Beatport top 100. A mashup named "Alesso vs. Gareth Emery & W&W - U Heroes (W&W & Hardwell Bootleg)" was featured in the Hardwell On Air 2014 Yearmix Part 2 episode of the radio show.

Hardwell's single "Everybody Is in the Place", which was released on 7 April 2014, was co-produced by the duo. The track marked their first chart appearance in the United Kingdom at #59 and reached the N°1 position in the Beatport top 100.

On 27 February 2014, they performed at the Hakkasan Nightclub in Las Vegas together with DJs Tiësto and Dzeko & Torres. Performances at big festivals followed, including the mainstages of the Electric Daisy Carnival in Las Vegas, Ultra Music Festival in Miami, and Tomorrowland in Belgium.

Their single "Rocket", produced with Blasterjaxx and released on 21 April 2014, received positive reactions. This track reached the N°2 position in the Beatport top 100. Hardwell produced a mashup of the track with his song "Spaceman", which he used as a closing track for his festival sets.

In May 2014 they published their remix of "I Got U" by Duke Dumont featuring Jax Jones.

In the framework of the 2014 FIFA World Cup in Brazil, on 9 June 2014, his "Eparrei" remix was published, which was a collaboration between Fatboy Slim, Dimitri Vegas & Like Mike, Diplo and Brazilian artists Pin and Bonde Do Role.

W&W also collaborated with Belgian DJ duo Dimitri Vegas & Like Mike to produce the official anthem for Tomorrowland 2014 titled "Waves". The song reached #7 on the Belgian singles chart and the 2nd position in the Beatport top 100.

On 21 July 2014, they released through their Mainstage imprint their edit of "Shadow" by Mark Sixma, which enjoyed some success in Beatport.

On 2 September 2014, W&W's second collaboration with Hardwell titled "The Dancefloor Is Yours" was released as a free download. The song was initially produced during a late-night studio session in the group's homeland and was premiered by Hardwell at the Electric Daisy Carnival 2013.

The pair collaborated with hardstyle DJ Headhunterz to produce "Shocker" which appeared on 8 September 2014, and "We Control The Sound", which was released a month later on 11 November 2014. "Shocker" was debuted at EDC 2014 in Las Vegas. The combination of W&W's big room with Headhunterz' hardstyle in both tracks was received positively.

On 22 December 2014, the duo released "Don't Stop The Madness", their third collaboration with Hardwell, which featured vocals from American rapper Fatman Scoop. This track would eventually appear on Hardwell's album United We Are during the next year.

=== 2015: "Rave After Rave", "The One", "Spack Jarrow" and "If It Ain't Dutch" ===
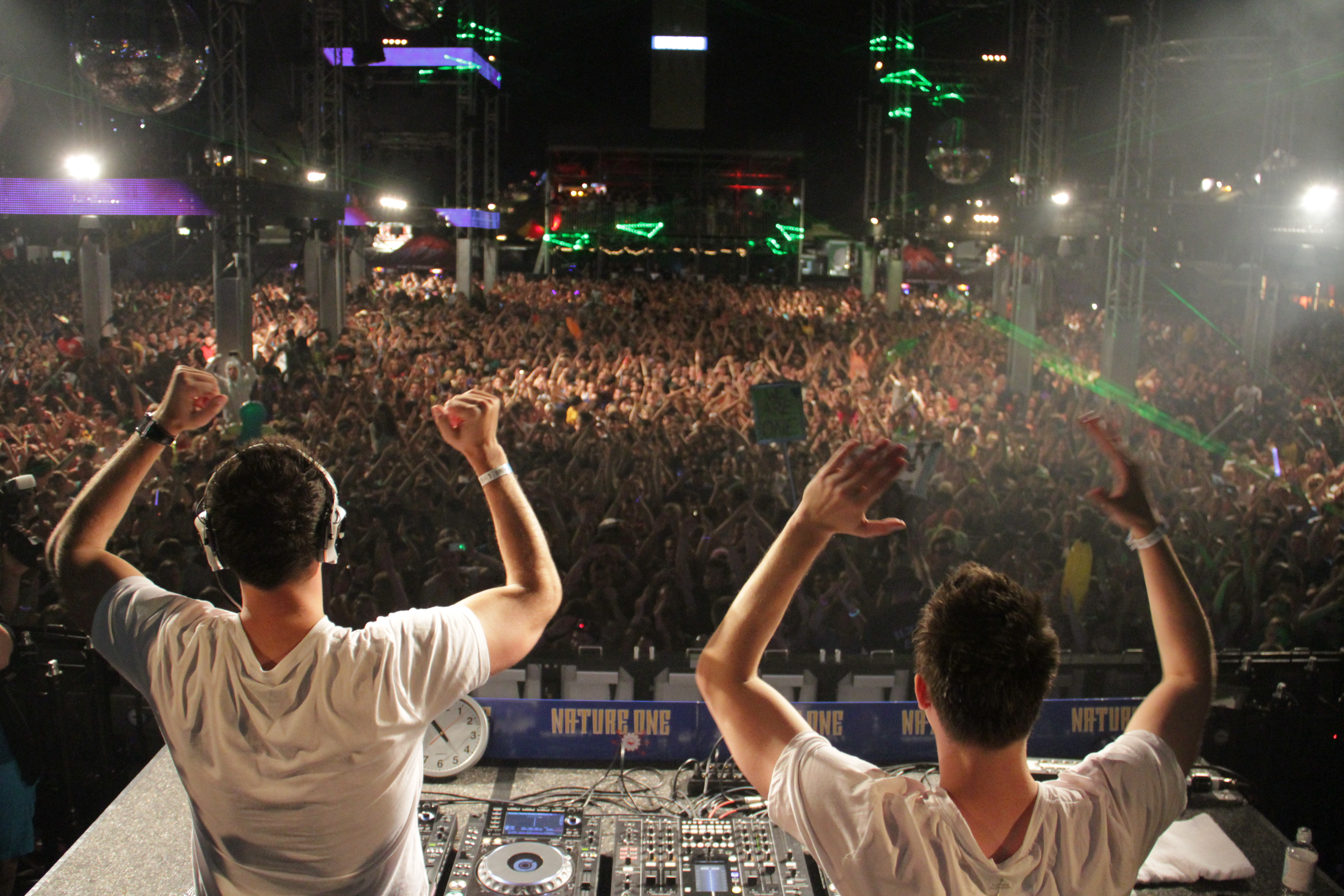
W&W at Nature One

In January 2015, Dimitri Vegas & Like Mike played W&W's instrumental production "Rave After Rave", which was labelled as an "ID" at the time of their world tour "Bringing the World Madness", so neither artists nor titles were announced. Hardwell also played the song at the Ziggo Dome for his "United We Are" tour in January 2015 while Tiësto played it at Ultra Buenos Aires. In the end, "Rave After Rave" was released as a solo track on 16 March 2015.

In early 2015 they released their long-awaited remix of Zombie Nation's "Kernkraft 400" as a free download. Also, their big room edit for Timmy Trumpet's "Freaks" featuring rapper Savage was officially released in a remix pack.

During their set at the Ultra Music Festival, the duo debuted new songs, including collaborations with MOTi and Hardwell, as well as a remix of the 2000 hit "Blue (Da Ba Dee)" by Italian trio Eiffel 65. A second collaboration with Blasterjaxx, titled "Bowser", was also debuted at the festival and was played for the first time in May in Tiësto’s "Club Life" podcast, as well as in Hardwell's "Hardwell on Air 218" radio show. "Bowser" was released through Revealed Recordings on 1 June 2015 and reached the #2 position in the Beatport top 100.

On 12 June 2015, W&W posted a teaser of their next single titled "The One" on Facebook. The teaser included a pitched sample of the song "How Will I Know" by Whitney Houston. In contrast to their previous big room house singles, which were characterised by loud synths and phat kicks, they took a more melodic approach to "The One". On 29 June 2015, the song was released on Armada Music. At the same time, they uploaded the official music video of the song which featured an animated love story between two young travellers.

In July 2015, a one-minute teaser of a collaboration with MOTi appeared on Facebook. However, the song title and release date were not announced with the teaser. The song eventually took the title of "Spack Jarrow" and was released on 24 August 2015 through Musical Freedom. The name is based on the character Jack Sparrow from the film series Pirates of the Caribbean. The song has a melodious similarity to the official Pirates of the Caribbean orchestral score, "He's a Pirate".

On 28 August 2015, W&W released a big room remix of the song "Sun Is Shining" by Swedish DJ duo Axwell Λ Ingrosso.

Their Facebook profile teased a remix to Nico & Vinz's "Am I Wrong", which currently remains unreleased.

Their remix of "Birds Fly" by Hardwell and Mr. Probz was published in the remix album of Hardwell's United We Are record.

On 21 December 2015, W&W released single "If It Ain't Dutch" in collaboration with Armin van Buuren on Mainstage Music. The track is a fusion of big room and trance, recalling the style of its predecessing single "D# Fat", also produced with van Buuren. The song was premiered at the 2015 Ultra Music Festival in Miami, which was then ripped from the live recording and uploaded onto various streaming sites under the title "Your House Is Mine", courtesy of a sample from Nelson Cruz's "My House" heard during the buildup. The song reached #1 on the Beatport Top 100 charts a few days after its release.

=== 2016: "Arcade", "Live the Night", "Caribbean Rave" and "Get Down" ===
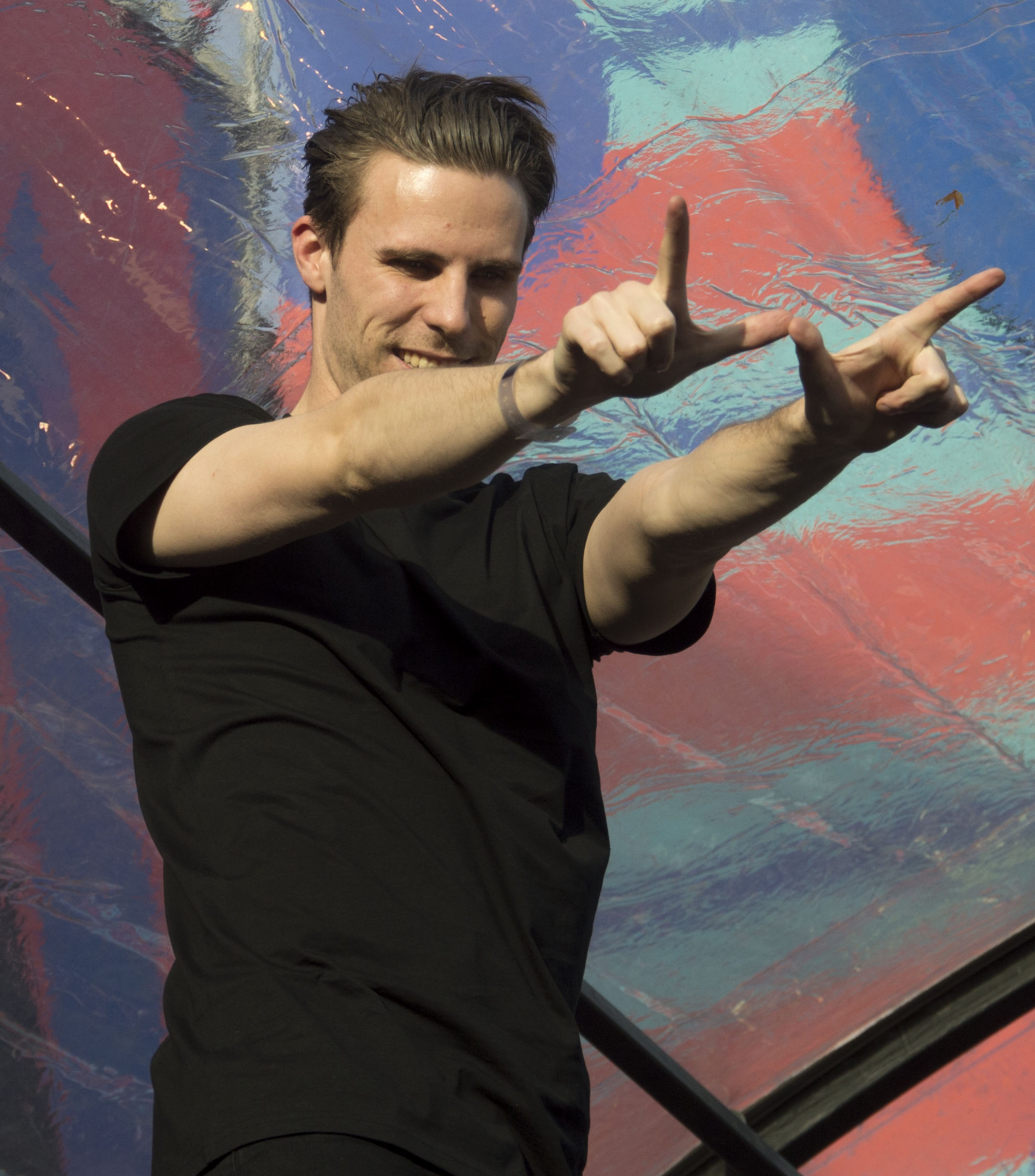
Willem van Hanegem shows the W&W-W, where the crowd always goes along.

At the 2015 Tomorrowland event, Dimitri Vegas & Like Mike played an unreleased song, which was later revealed to be a collaboration with W&W in a Tomorrowland Aftermovie. In mid-February, Dimitri Vegas & Like Mike announced that the song would be released on 29 February 2016 with the title "Arcade". In parallel, they launched a PR action on their website, where a selection of classic, well-known "arcade games" such as Mortal Kombat, Pac-Man or Donkey Kong could be played on a game machine. The official music video came out on 1 March, showing the four producers in comic style as they are drawn into an arcade machine and become characters in various arcade games. The song became a success and reached #1 on the Beatport Top 100.

On 28 March 2016, "How Many" was released through Armada Music which was described as a hybrid of happy hardcore, eurodance and big room house.

On 15 April 2016, the duo's remix of "Don't Let Me Down" by The Chainsmokers and Daya was released. Together with The Chainsmokers, they premiered the song's remix at the Ultra Music Festival in Miami.

On 1 June they released their remix of "Needed Me" by Rihanna, with trap influences.

On 11 July 2016, "Live the Night" appeared as the fourth collaboration with Hardwell, which had been played by both Hardwell and W&W since 2014. The track was long-awaited by listeners, but the trio had not been satisfied with both the instrumental version or the version recorded with Harrison's vocals, and eventually settled on vocals by US crunk rapper Lil Jon.

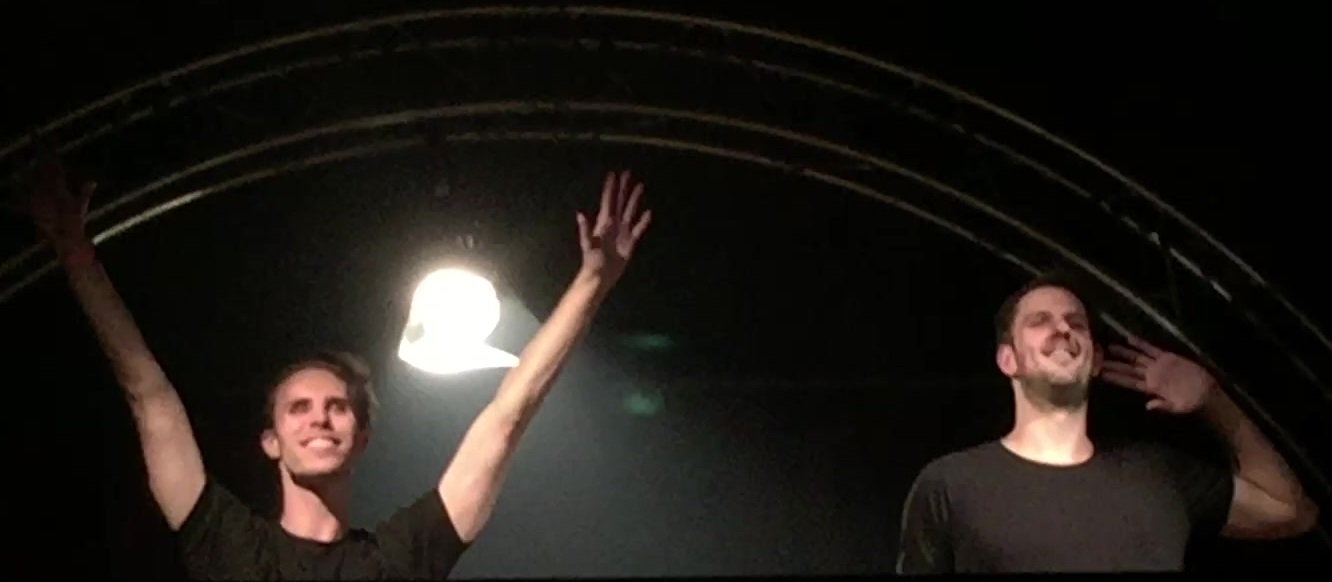
W&W live at Airbeat One 2016 in Germany

In 2015, the track "Meet Her at Tomorrowland" was made available on the compilation album The Secret Kingdom of Melodia, which was a cover version of the 2000 track "Meet Her at the Love Parade" by Da Hool and was produced with Dimitri Vegas & Like Mike. As a separate free track, the title was released on 8 August 2016 by Dimitri Vegas & Like Mike without W&W being credited.

The track "Caribbean Rave" was used as an intro for their festival sets between spring and autumn in 2016, and was officially released on 31 October 2016 through Mainstage Music. The song was stylized as a big room track with a "touch of the Caribbean" based on its instrumental sounds.

On 18 November 2016, they released their fifth official collaboration with Hardwell titled "Get Down". It enjoyed popularity following its premiere at the Ultra Music Festival. Unlike its predecessors, the track was based on jungle terror elements together with their typical big room style. The track was released on Revealed Recordings and not on Mainstage Music, and reached #13 on the Beatport Top 100.

In 2016 W&W reached their highest position in the DJ Mag Top 100, ranking 13th.

=== 2017: "Whatcha Need", "Put Em Up", "Chakra" with Vini Vici and "Crowd Control" ===
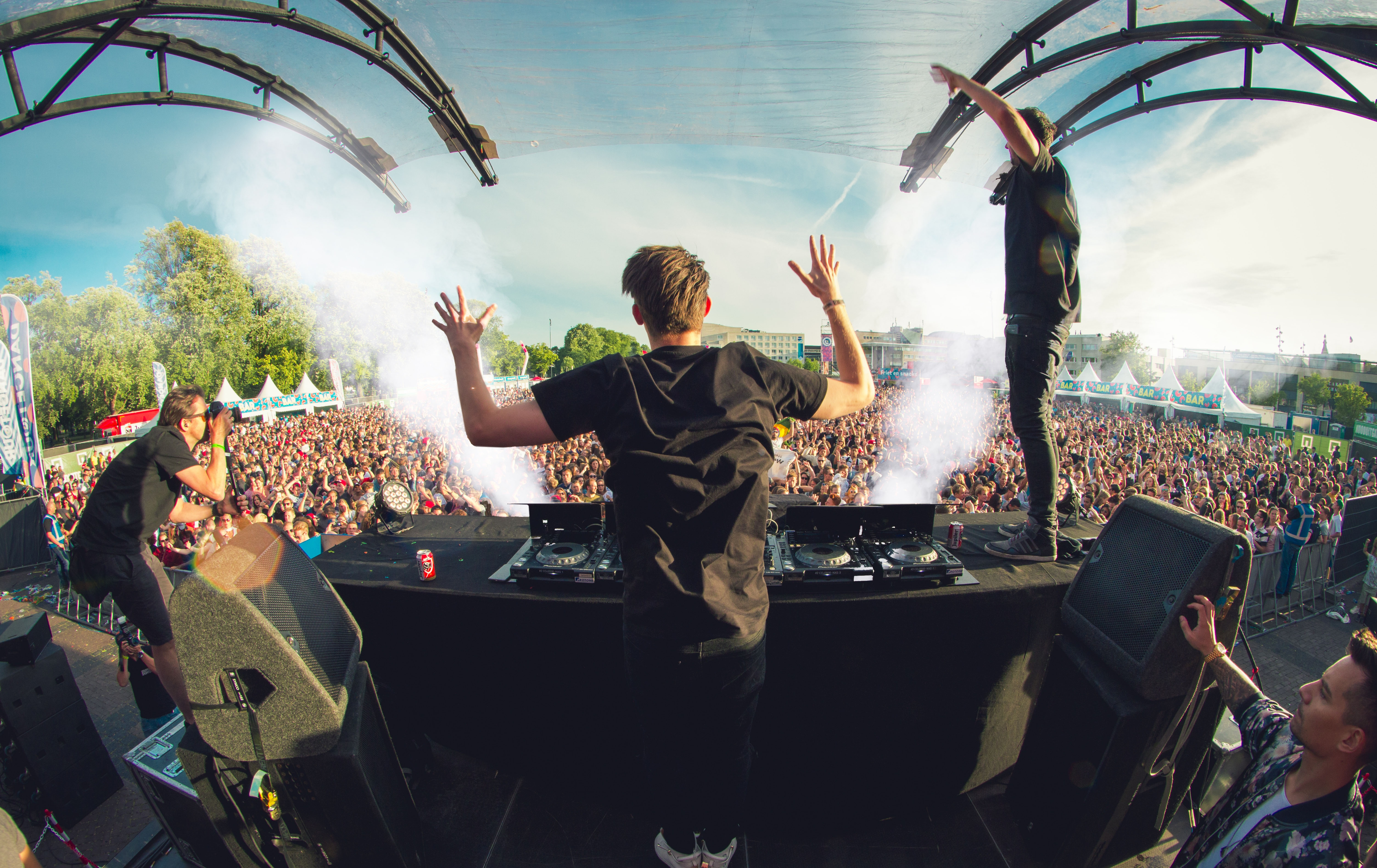
W&W live at Breda Dance Music Festival 2017

"Whatcha Need" was released on 27 January 2017. The song stands out from their other releases as it was shaped with trance influences and rhythmic changes. On 10 April 2017, "Put Em Up" was released. The track is based on W&W's classic big-room style combined with "Lean On"-like dancehall elements. A Hardwell-produced mash-up with "Gasolina" by Daddy Yankee also achieved popularity.

On Koningsdag, the radio station SLAM! hosted their annual festival. W&W were announced as headliners, and premiered new music and a new festival bootleg of "Habiba" by Dutch rapper Boef.

On 18 September 2017, the duo released a collaboration with the Israeli psy-trance duo Vini Vici titled "Chakra". The song is based on Vini Vici's psychedelic trance style and contained big room elements. "Chakra" reached #2 in the Beatport Top 100.

Due to the Amsterdam Dance Event, the duo was part of the SLAM! Mix Marathon at Ziggo Dome. As a special guest, Hardwell appeared during their set and performed with them. In the course of the ADE W&W released the single "Crowd Control" on 20 October, a new collaboration with Dimitri Vegas & Like Mike. The song is a clone of the Defqon.1 2016 edit of the song "Dikke Vette Bassplaat" (Translation: Big Fat Bass Record) by ZaZaFront (a supergroup formed by Zany, MC DV8, and B-Front), the vocals of which consist of "move it to the left, take it to the right", as well as on a provisional, hardstyle-based remix of "Stampede". The DJs then encourage the crowd to put their arms over each other's shoulders and to jump eight steps to the left as well as eight steps to the right fitting the beat.

In the 20th edition of the DJ Mag Top 100, which was announced on 21 October 2017, W&W slipped one place to #14.

=== 2018: "God Is a Girl", "Long Way Down" and Rave Culture label rebrand ===
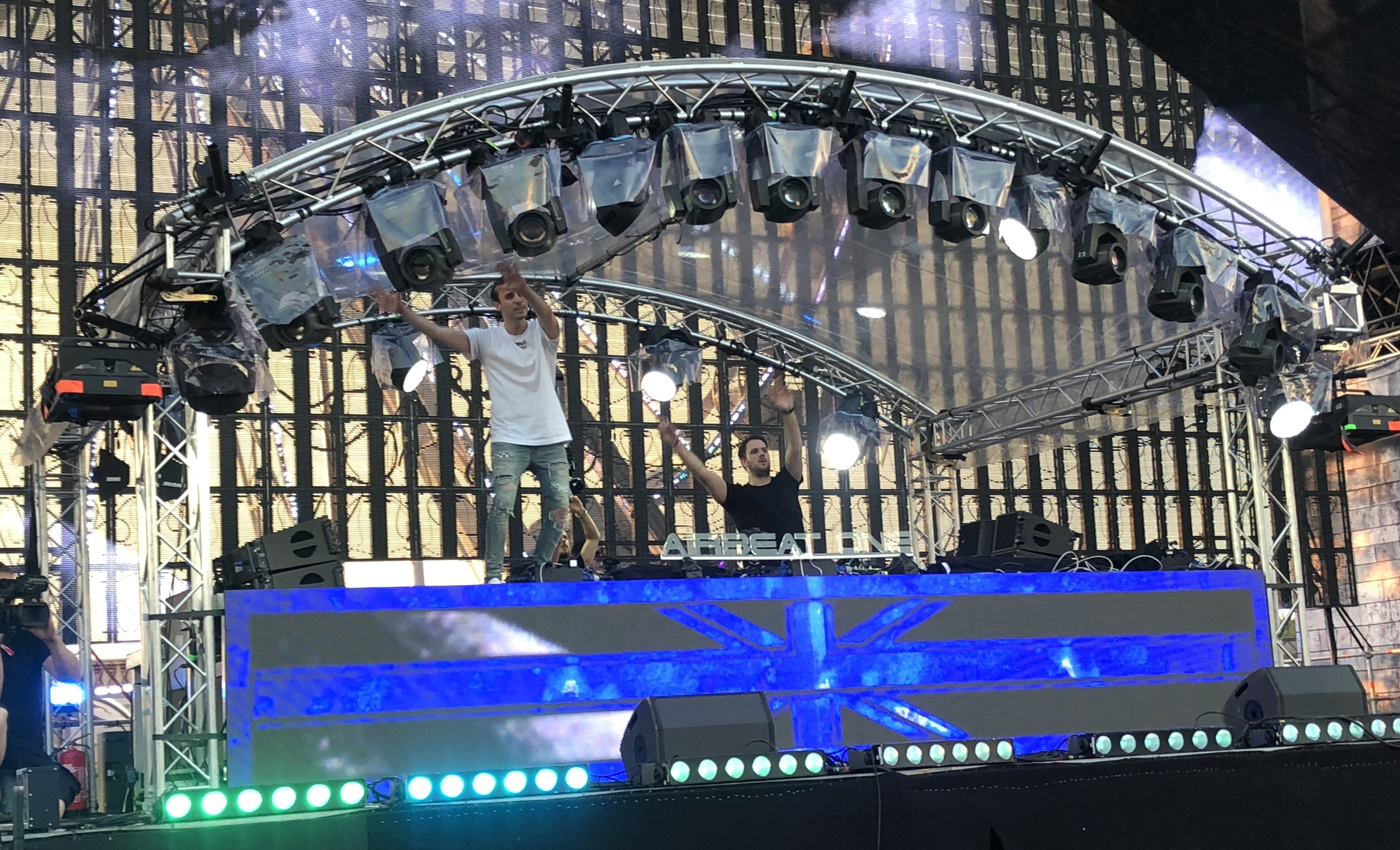
W&W live at Airbeat One Festival 2018

Previously on 18 December 2017, the duo's remake of the 666 track "Supa Dupa Fly" was released on Beatport without any promotion, and the song was then removed from the platform. "Supa Dupa Fly 2018" was later officially released as a free download on 9 April.

W&W released a happy hardcore/hands up-inspired remake of Groove Coverage's 2002 eurodance single "God Is a Girl" on 12 March 2018.

On the Yearmix edition of their Mainstage podcast, they debuted the studio version of their remix of the number-one hit "Habiba" by Dutch rapper Boef.

W&W experimented again with the happy hardcore genre with "Long Way Down", which was produced along with English DJ Darren Styles and released on 7 May 2018 through Armada Music.

In October 2018, W&W rebranded their Mainstage Music label as Rave Culture to place a stronger focus on creative freedom and different electronic dance music genres. They released a single of the same name on 8 October 2018, which takes homage from the original 2012 big room sound with updated production standards, reminiscent of "Cannonball" by Showtek and Justin Prime.

Their third collaboration with Armin van Buuren, a hard trance-big room hybrid titled "Ready to Rave", was released through the same label on 4 December 2018.

At the end of 2018 the duo remixed "Waste It On Me" by Steve Aoki featuring K-Pop group BTS, through Ultra Records.

=== 2019: "Repeat After Me", "Matrix", "Ups & Downs", "Let the Music Take Control", "Khaleesi" and "Tricky Tricky" ===
2019 was a year in which W&W dedicated mainly to launch collaborations. On 11 January 2019, they published their long-awaited collaboration with Armin van Buuren and Dimitri Vegas & Like Mike titled "Repeat After Me", through Armind, and it became a Beatport top 10.

The duo released their third happy hardcore single "The Light" on 1 March 2019, which featured the vocals of Japanese virtual YouTuber Kizuna AI.

After these two releases, during 2019 W&W published tracks like "Matrix" with Maurice West; "Ups & Downs" with Nicky Romero; their third collaboration with Blasterjaxx, "Let the Music Take Control"; "Khaleesi" with 3 Are Legend (supergroup consisting of Dimitri Vegas & Like Mike and Steve Aoki); and "Tricky Tricky" with Timmy Trumpet and Will Sparks featuring Sequenza.

Through their record label Rave Culture, works by artists such as Maurice West, Andrew Rayel, or Sandro Silva, to name a few, were published.

=== 2020: "Wizard of the Beats", "Do It for You", 20XX XR Livestream, "Clap Your Hands" ===
2020 began with the release of two singles, starting with "Wizard of the Beats" with Dutch DJ Sandro Silva and Israeli producer Zafrir, and "Do It for You" with future house duo Lucas & Steve.

In May 2020, W&W announced a Livestream that took place in the Li-Ning Arena in Rave Culture City, due to the COVID-19 pandemic on 23 May on platforms such as Facebook Live and Twitch. The set contained brand new music from Rave Culture acts such as ANG, KEVU, SaberZ, Jaxx & Vega, Sandro Silva, and MONTA.

On 29 May, they released "Clap Your Hands", a collaboration with Dimitri Vegas & Like Mike and Fedde Le Grand.

Other tracks released in 2020 were "Comin' to Getcha", "Rave Love" (with AXMO feat. Sonja), and "Gold".

=== 2010s to 2021 ===
W&W released a remix of O-Zone's "Dragostea Din Tei" and a collaboration with R3hab and Timmy Trumpet called "Distant Memory". W&W later revealed that they created the alias in response to the listeners who kept asking them about their older trance sound. They explained that only a few of their festival set IDs will ever be released since most of their played songs are merely "playable versions" which are unfit for proper studio releases, and that they prioritise releasing tracks which revolve only around a specific theme.

On 13 March 2017, they released a remix of the track "Castle on the Hill" by Ed Sheeran, their first production under the pseudonym. Their big room work influenced their new productions. On 26 March 2017, they performed at the Ultra Music Festival.

NWYR first official release was a remix of "Saving Light" by Gareth Emery, Standerwick and Haliene. The NWYR style makes the first drops experimental, and the second drop harder and more melodic.

On 12 June 2017, they released the first single of their new project, "Voltage". On 20 November 2017, NWYR released their successor to "Voltage" titled "Dragon", which is a big room-infused trance track.

They released the single "Ends Of Time" as a free download on 16 March 2018, which was initially debuted during their 2017 A State of Trance radio sets.

Their bootleg of "Northern Soul" by Above & Beyond featuring Richard Bedford was highly acclaimed by fans but it still remains unreleased.

Their bootleg of "Played-A-Live (The Bongo Song)" by Safri Duo with Willem De Roo was highly acclaimed by fans but it also remains unreleased.

The duo's "mash-boot" of "In The Air Tonight" by Phil Collins was also very well received but it also remains unreleased.

The duo released an extended play on 28 August 2018, which they gave away as a free download. The EP comprises two tracks, "Time Spiral" which incorporates psy-trance elements, and "Wormhole".

NWYR released their first collaborative track on 4 February 2019, titled "The Melody" with Andrew Rayel. The two artists described the song as a blend of their respective melodic musical styles through a joint statement.

On 29 April 2019, NWYR released "Artificial Intelligence" as a free download.

On 2 December 2019, NWYR released "Mind Control" as a free download.

On 20 April 2020, NWYR released their long-awaited track, "Heart Eyes" as a free download.

On 6 August 2020, NWYR released "Gamer" as a free download.

On 13 November 2020, NWYR released "Drakaina" as a free download.

On 12 February 2021, NWYR released “Shenron” as a free download.

On 4 June 2021, NWYR released “InterGalactic”, on collaboration with FLRNTN (Graham Bell) and Darius & Finlay, the first track as NWYR on Rave Culture.

=== 2025: OIIA Cat ===
The duo released a song based on the viral OIIA Cat meme called "OIIA OIIA (Spinning Cat)" on 17 January 2025.

== Members ==
- Willem van Hanegem, born 25 June 1987 in Breda, Netherlands) said that his enthusiasm for trance arose at age 11 and was due to the hearing of different compilations. At 14, he started to DJ and two years later to produce his own songs.
- Ward van der Harst, born 26 December 1988 in Dongen, Netherlands) also started at age 14. He produced his own tracks with cheap equipment and got his first recording contracts at 17, including Armin van Buuren's label Armada Music.

== Discography ==
- Impact (2011)

== Awards and nominations ==
Year	Awards	Category	Recipient	Outcome	Ref
2015	IDMA	Best Trance Track	Thunder	Nominated	
2015	IDMA	Best Trance DJ	W&W	Nominated	
2015	IDMA	Best Progressive House / Electro DJ	W&W	Nominated	
2016	NRJ Music Awards	Best Collaboration of the Year	W&W	Nominated	
2016	IDMA	Best Progressive House / Electro DJ	W&W	Nominated	

=== DJ Magazine top 100 DJs ===
Year	Position	Notes	Ref.
2010	71	New Entry	
2011	36	Up 35	
2012	25	Up 11	
2013	14	Up 11	
2014	18	Down 4	
2015	14	Up 4	
2016	13	Up 1	
2017	14	Down 1	
2018	14	No Change	
2019	18	Down 4	
2020	14	Up 4	
2021	14	No Change	
2022	18	Down 4	
2023	16	Up 2	
2024	21	Down 5	
