= Revealed Recordings =

Dutch record label

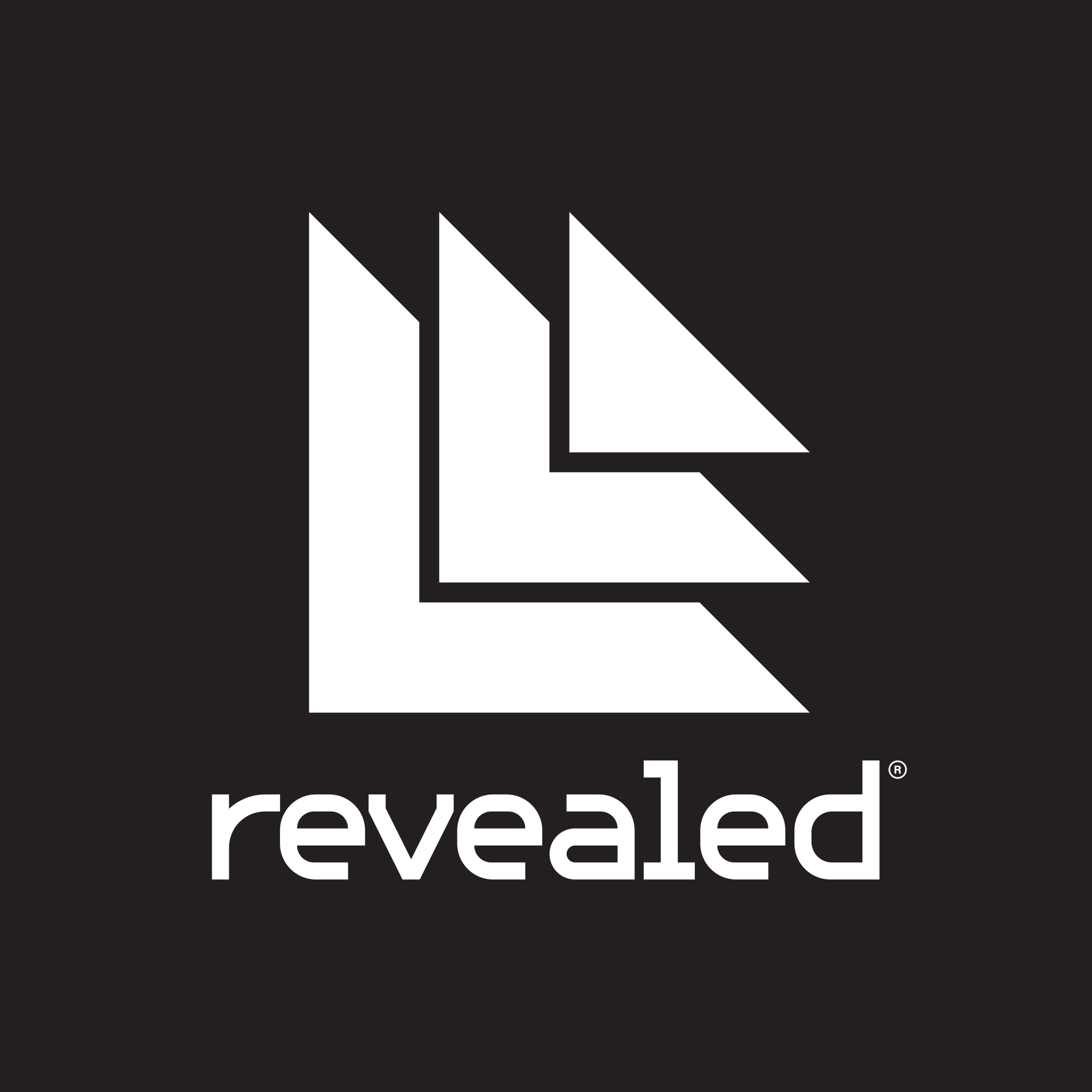
- Founded: April 11, 2010
- Founder: Hardwell
- Genre: Electro house; big room house; hardstyle; progressive house; bass house
- Country of origin: Netherlands
- Location: Breda, North Brabant, Netherlands
- Official website: revealedrecordings.com

Revealed Recordings (or shortened to Revealed, stylized as revealed) is a Dutch record label established by Hardwell in 2010. The label is headquartered in Breda, North Brabant.

== History ==
The label was established on 11 April 2010 by electronic music producer and DJ Hardwell. Revealed mainly focuses on big room house, dance-pop, and electro house.

The label has had some success, including "Apollo" by Hardwell featuring Amba Shepherd, which peaked on No. 26 of the Dutch Top 40; Hardwell's 2014 single "Dare You" was also successful, entering the UK Singles Chart at No. 18. "Dare You" has also been used on adverts for television programs such as Strictly Come Dancing.. "Cell" by Julian Calor is frequently used in Ultra Music Festival livestream broadcasts. "Radical" by Dyro & Dannic featured in the soundtrack for Just Dance 2017. The festival mix of Kaaze & Maddix's "People Are Strange" was also used in the trailer for the film Hubie Halloween.

In 2015, Revealed launched a radio show called Revealed Radio, hosted by a different artist from the label each week, starting with Hardwell. The label has over 200 track releases.

In 2016, Revealed released an a cappella pack to celebrate six years of their establishment.

In 2018, Revealed announced that there will be a new sublabel of Revealed, titled Gemstone Records. The label will focus on the pop side of electronic music.

In 2019, it was announced that Revealed would host a stage at Ultra Music Festival in 2020 on the UMF Radio stage, celebrating Revealed's 10 year anniversary.

In 2020, Revealed celebrated their 10-year anniversary with a 360° livestream event at the De Koepelkerk in Amsterdam. The livestream featured DJ performances from Revealed artists; Tim Hox, Dastic, Dannic, Maddix, Mike Williams, Olly James, Sick Individuals, Kaaze, Bassjackers, Dr Phunk, Blasterjaxx, and Tony Junior.

In 2024, Revealed reached the milestone of 1,000 releases, with the 1,000th being "Move", a collaboration between Hardwell and Kaaze. In an interview with EDM.com, Hardwell explained the creation of the 1,000th release as, "The moment we nailed that melody, we both felt this track was going to be something special. The timing of the 1,000th release and "Move" being finished felt like the perfect synergy for having Kaaze join me in celebrating this key moment."

== Artists ==
- 3lau
- 9Lives
- Afrojack
- Angger Dimas
- Arty
- Blackcode
- Blasterjaxx
- Conro
- Dada Life
- DallasK
- Dannic
- Dash Berlin
- Dastic
- DubVision
- Dyro
- Ephesto
- Firebeatz
- Futuristic Polar Bears
- Giuseppe Ottaviani
- Hardwell
- Headhunterz
- Jaycen A'mour
- Jeffrey Sutorius
- Jewelz & Sparks
- Joe Ghost
- Joey Dale
- Jordy Dazz
- Julian Calor
- Julian Jordan
- Justin Oh
- Justin Prime
- Kaaze
- Kevu
- Kid Massive
- Kill the Buzz
- Krimsonn
- Kshmr
- Kura
- Lusso
- Maddix
- Magnificence
- Makj
- Mako
- Manse
- Mark Sixma
- Meirlin
- Mr.Black
- Mightyfools
- Olly James
- Pitchback
- Quintino
- Reggio
- Robert Falcon
- Ryos
- Sandro Silva
- Sartek
- Showtek
- Sick Individuals
- Steven Vegas
- Sultan & Shepard
- Suyano
- Syn Cole
- Thomas Gold
- Thomas Newson
- Tiësto
- Tom Swoon
- Ummet Ozcan
- Vicetone
- Vinai
- Vinne
- W&W
- Wasback
- Will Sparks
- Wiwek
- You Liang
