= Fedde Le Grand discography =

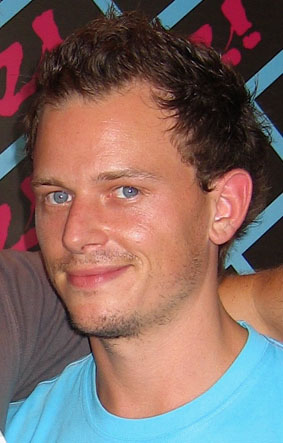
- Studio albums: 3
- Singles: 21

This is the discography of the Dutch record producer and DJ Fedde Le Grand.

== Albums ==
=== Studio albums ===
List of studio albums, with selected chart positions
Title	Album details	Peak chart positions
Title	Album details	NLD
Output	Released: 14 September 2009; Label: Flamingo; Formats: CD, digital download	63
Something Real	Released: 26 February 2016; Label: Ultra; Formats: CD, digital download	20

== Singles ==
=== As lead artist ===
List of singles as lead artist, with selected chart positions and certifications, showing year released and album name
Title	Year	Peak chart positions									Certifications	Album
Title	Year	NLD	AUS	AUT	BEL	FRA	GER	SWE	SWI	UK	Certifications	Album
"Put Your Hands Up 4 Detroit"	2006	5	8	56	14	34	59	33	61	1	BPI: Platinum	Non-album singles
"Just Trippin"	2006	40	—	—	—	—	—	—	—	—		Non-album singles
"The Creeps" (with Camille Jones)	2007	22	15	—	14	—	82	—	—	7		Non-album singles
"Let Me Think About It" (vs. Ida Corr)	2007	12	14	13	21	29	14	—	23	2	BPI: Gold	Non-album singles
"Scared of Me" (featuring Mitch Crown)	2009	39	—	—	—	—	80	—	—	—		Output
"Let Me Be Real" (featuring Mitch Crown)	2009	—	—	—	—	—	89	—	—	—		Output
"Long Way from Home" (with Sultan & Shepard)	2013	90	—	—	73	150	—	—	—	—		Non-album singles
"No Good" (with Sultan & Shepard)	2013	—	—	—	57	60	—	—	—	—		Non-album singles
"Where We Belong" (with Di-rect)	2013	44	—	—	—	—	—	—	—	—		Non-album singles
"Tales of Tomorrow" (with Dimitri Vegas & Like Mike featuring Julian Perretta)	2015	—	—	64	2	—	—	—	—	—		Non-album singles
"—" denotes a recording that did not chart or was not released in that territory.

=== Non-charted singles ===
Year	Title
2004	"Las Vegas"
2005	"The Vibe"
2005	"I Miss You"
2005	"Get This Feeling"
2007	"Take No Shhh" (presents Flamingo Project)
2007	"Aah Yeah!"
2008	"Get This Feeling" (reissue)
2009	"F1"
2009	"The Joker" (with Funkerman)
2010	"Back and Forth" (featuring Mr.V)
2010	"Rockin' High" (featuring Mitch Crown)
2011	"Autosave" (with Patric La Funk)
2011	"Metrum"
2012	"Turn It" (with Deniz Koyu and Johan Wedel)
2012	"Sparks" (with Nicky Romero)
2012	"Sparks (Turn Off Your Mind)" (with Nicky Romero featuring Matthew Koma)
2012	"Raw"
2013	"Rockin' N Rollin"
2013	"Lion (Feel the Love)" (featuring Michael Calfan)
2014	"Don't Give Up"
2014	"You Got This"
2014	"Twisted"
2015	"Robotic" (with Jewelz & Sparks)
2015	"Falling" (feat. Niels Geusebroek)
2015	"Take Me Home" (with Patric La Funk)
2015	"Cinematic" (feat. Denny White)
2015	"Give Me Some" (with Merk & Kremont)
2015	"The Noise (Yeah Baby)" (featuring Kepler)
2015	"Feel Good" (with Holl & Rush)
2016	"Keep On Believing"
2016	"I Can Feel" (with Cobra Effect)
2016	"Rhythm of the Night"
2016	"Down on Me"
2017	"Dancing Together"
2017	"Love's Gonna Get You" (with D.O.D.)
2017	"Keep On Rising" (featuring Ian Carey)
2017	"Firestarter" (with Ida Corr featuring Shaggy)
2017	"Coco's Miracle" (with Dannic vs Coco Star)
2017	"Wonder Years" (featuring Adam McInnis)
2018	"Monsta"
2018	"You Got Me Runnin'"
2018	"Flex" (with Funk Machine)
2018	"Hit the Club" (with Raiden)
2019	"All Over the World"
2019	"Like We Do"
2019	"Skank"
2020	"To the Top" (with Marc Benjamin)
2020	"1234" (with Afrojack featuring MC Ambush)
2020	"Clap Your Hands" (with Dimitri Vegas & Like Mike and W&W)
2020	"You Should Know" (with Sam Feldt featuring Craig Smart)
2020	"Gatekeeper" (with Ally Brooke)
2021	"Bang Bang" (with 22Bullets)
2021	"Sucker for Love" (with Nome featuring Amanda Collis)
2021	"Same Thing" (with Love Harder featuring Amy Grace)
2021	"Devils" (with Vince Freeman)
2022	"Heaven" (with Robert Falcon featuring Sofia Quinn)
2023	"To the Lonely" (with Simon Ward)

== Free tracks ==
- 2012: Freaky (with Nicky Romero)
- 2012: Slacking (with Nicky Romero feat. MC Gee)
- 2018: The Gaming Beat (feat. Kris Kiss)
- 2018: You Lift Me Up
- 2018: Scream Out Loud

== Remixes ==
- 2004: Anita Kelsey - "Every Kiss"
- 2005: Funkerman and Raf - "Rule The Night"
- 2005: Erick E - "Boogie Down"
- 2005: Funkerman - "The One"
- 2006: Camille Jones - "The Creeps"
- 2006: Erick E Feat. Gina J - "Boogie Down"
- 2006: Freeform Five - "No More Conversations"
- 2006: Olav Basoski Feat. Mc Spyder - "Like Dis"
- 2006: Erick E - "The Beat Is Rockin'"
- 2006: Sharam - "Party All The Time" (Fedde Le Grand Remix)
- 2007: Ida Corr - "Let Me Think About It"
- 2007: The Factory - "Couldn't Love You More" (Fedde Le Grand Remix)
- 2007: Robbie Williams - "King Of Bongo"
- 2007: Samim - "Heater"
- 2008: Martin Solveig - "C'est La Vie" (Fedde vs. Martin Club Mix)
- 2008: Madonna - "Give It 2 Me"
- 2008: Stereo MCs - "Black Gold"
- 2010: Benny Benassi featuring Kelis, apl.de.ap, and Jean Baptiste - "Spaceship"
- 2010: Everything But The Girl - "Missing"
- 2011: David Guetta featuring Taio Cruz and Ludacris - "Little Bad Girl" (Fedde Le Grand Remix)
- 2011: Coldplay - "Paradise" (Fedde Le Grand Remix)
- Rage Against The Machine - "Killing In the Name" (Fedde Le Grand Remix)
- 2012: Digitalism - "Zdarlight" (Fedde Le Grand and Deniz Koyu Remix)
- 2013: Timeflies - "I Choose U" (Fedde Le Grand Remix)
- 2013: Nikki Williams - "Glowing" (Fedde Le Grand Remix)
- 2014: Shakira featuring Rihanna - "Can't Remember To Forget You" (Fedde Le Grand Remix)
- 2014: Mariah Carey - "You're Mine" (Fedde Le Grand Remix)
- 2014: Michael Jackson - "Love Never Felt So Good" (Fedde Le Grand Remix)
- 2014: Mary Lambert - "Secrets" (Fedde Le Grand Remix)
- 2014: Naughty Boy featuring Sam Romans - "Home" (Fedde Le Grand Remix)
- 2014: Nicky Romero and Vicetone - "Let Me Feel" (Fedde Le Grand Remix)
- 2015: Madonna - "Bitch I'm Madonna" (Fedde Le Grand Remix)
- 2015: Faithless - "Insomnia" (Fedde Le Grand Remix)
- 2018: The Chainsmokers - "Side Effects" (Fedde Le Grand Remix)
- 2019: Loud Luxury and Anders - "Love No More" (Fedde Le Grand Remix)
- 2019: Matoma featuring MNEK and Kiana Ledé - "Bruised Not Broken" (Fedde Le Grand Remix)
- 2019: Charlie Puth - "Mother" (Fedde Le Grand Remix)
- 2020: Josh Cumbee - "Worth Missing" (Fedde Le Grand Remix)
- 2021: Sigala and Rita Ora - "You for Me" (Fedde Le Grand Remix)
