= Ida Corr discography =

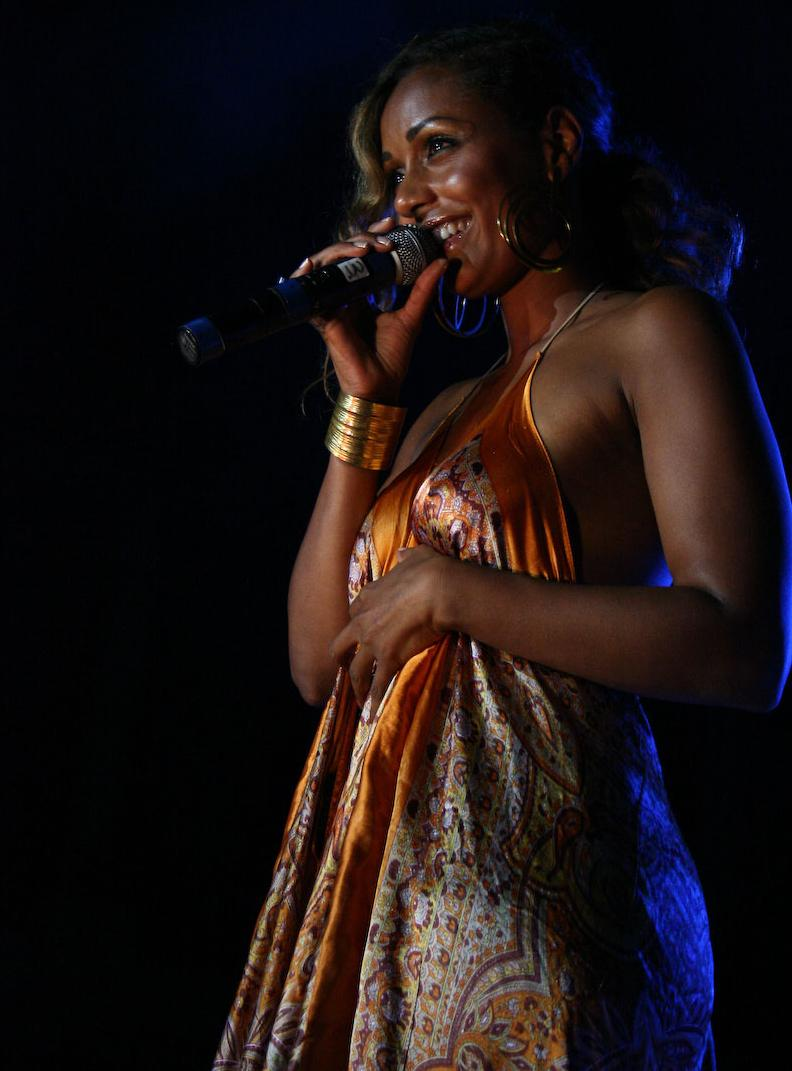
- Studio albums: 5
- Compilation albums: 1
- Singles: 18
- Music videos: 8

The discography of Ida Corr, a Danish soul and pop singer and songwriter, consists of three studio albums, one international compilation album, ten singles as a lead artist, and a number of collaborations with other artists. In 2002 she released a self-titled album with the girl group Sha Li Mar, who rose to fame in the TV2 show Venner for livet (literally "Friends Forever"). As a member of the group SugaRush Beat Company Ida Corr has released one studio album and several singles since 2005.

== Albums ==
=== Studio albums ===
Year	Album
2005	Streetdiva: Released: 18 April 2005; Label: Kick Music; Format: CD
2006	Robosoul: Released: 11 October 2006; Label: Kick Music; Format: CD
2009	Under the Sun: Released: 31 August 2009; Label: Lifted House; Formats: CD, digital download
2013	Corr Values: Released: 28 October 2013; Label: House of Corr; Formats: CD, digital download

=== Compilation albums ===
Year	Album	Charts
Year	Album	DEN
2008	One: Released: 17 March 2008; Label: Lifted House; Formats: CD, digital download	23
2012	Singled Out: Released: 29 October 2012; Label: Lifted House; Formats: CD, digital download	—

=== Albums with groups ===
Year	Album details
2002	Sha Li Mar (Sha Li Mar): Released: 11 November 2002; Label: CMC; Format: CD
2008	SugaRush Beat Company (SugaRush Beat Company): Released: 29 September 2008; Label: RCA Label Group; Format: CD, digital download

== Singles ==
=== As lead artist ===
Year	Title	Charts						Certifications	Album
Year	Title	DEN	AUS	GER	SWE	NZ	UK	Certifications	Album
2004	"U Make Me Wanna" (featuring Ataf Khawaja)	—	—	—	—	—	—		Streetdiva
2005	"Make Them Beg" (featuring Al Agami)	—	—	—	—	—	—		Streetdiva
2005	"Country Girl"	—	—	—	—	—	—		Streetdiva
2006	"Lonely Girl"	—	—	—	—	—	—		Robosoul
2006	"Late Night Bimbo" (featuring Bow Hunt)	—	—	—	—	—	—		Robosoul
2007	"Let Me Think About It" (vs. Fedde Le Grand)	12	14	14	—	12	2	IFPI DEN: Platinum; BPI: Gold	Robosoul
2008	"Ride My Tempo"	8	—	54	28	—	—		One
2009	"Time"	—	—	—	—	—	—		Under the Sun
2009	"I Want You"	—	—	—	—	—	—		Under the Sun
2010	"Under the Sun" (featuring Shaggy)	—	—	—	—	—	—		Under the Sun
2010	"In the Name of Love"	—	—	—	—	—	—		Under the Sun
2011	"What Goes Around Comes Around"	—	—	—	—	—	—		Under the Sun
2011	"Musen efter katten"	13	—	—	—	—	—		Non-album single
2012	"Naughty Girl"	—	—	—	—	—	—		Singled Out
2012	"Tonight I'm Your DJ" (featuring Fatman Scoop)	—	—	—	—	—	—		Singled Out
2013	"Hold My Head Up High"	23	—	—	—	—	—		Corr Values
2013	"I Found Her"	—	—	—	—	—	—		Corr Values
2013	"Jungle Fever"	—	—	—	—	—	—		Corr Values
2020	"I Know This Club" (with Bingo Players)	—	—	—	—	—	—		Non-album single
2025	"Keep Hope Alive" (with Tripolism)	—	—	—	—	—	—		Non-album single
"—" denotes a recording that did not chart or was not released.

=== As featured artist ===
Year	Title	Charts	Album
Year	Title	DEN	Album
2004	"I Put My Faith in You" (with Morten Trust)	—	non-album single
2007	"Mirror 07-07-07" (with Fedde Le Grand)	—	non-album single
2008	"African Jewel" (with Kuku Agami)	—	Closure
2009	"Illusion" (with Simon Mathew)	—	non-album single
2010	"My Friend" (with Global Deejays)	—	non-album single
2010	"Unconditional Love" (with Funkerman)	—	House for All
2010	"I Can't Wait" (with Eric Gadd and Stine Bramsen)	—	Rise Up!
2011	"Sjus" (with Kato, Camille Jones & Johnson)	1	Discolized 2.0
2012	"You Make My Heart Go" (with Havin Zagross & Alex Saja)	—	Non-album singles
2012	"See You Later" (with Bimbo Jones)	—	Non-album singles
2012	"Fly Away" (with D.I.A)	—	Non-album singles
2012	"Ready Set Go" (with Chris Minh Doky)	—	Non-album singles
2016	"Good Life" (with Oliver Heldens)	—	Non-album singles

=== As part of a group ===
Year	Single	Album
2008	"L-O-V-E" (SugaRush Beat Company)	SugaRush Beat Company
2008	"They Said I Said" (SugaRush Beat Company)	SugaRush Beat Company
2009	"Love Breed" (SugaRush Beat Company)	SugaRush Beat Company

== Music videos ==
Year	Title	Director(s)	Notes
2006	"Lonely Girl"	Malte Pedersson	
2007	"Let Me Think About It"	Marcus Adams	Uses "Let Me Think About It" (Fedde Le Grand Radio Edit)
2008	"L-O-V-E" (SugaRush Beat Company)	Dan Hartney	
2008	"They Said I Said" (SugaRush Beat Company)	Dan Hartney	
2009	"Ride My Tempo"	Mike Larsen	
2009	"I Want You"	Peter Stenbæk	Uses "I Want You" (Jason Gault Edit)
2009	"Illusion" (Simon Mathew and Ida Corr)	Din Mor	
2010	"Skrøbeligt Fundament" (Støt Haiti All Stars)	Michael Sauer Christensen	
2010	"Time"	Markus Gerwinat	
2010	"Afrika 2010" (Afrika 2010 artists)	Niels Due-Boje	
2011	"Sjus" (Kato feat. Ida Corr, Camille Jones & Johnson)	Michael Christensen	
2011	"Musen Efter Katten"	Kasper V. Kristensen	
2011	"What Goes Around Comes Around"	?	
2012	"Naughty Girl"	Kasper V. Kristensen	Uses the Danish-language "Radio Edit"
2012	"You Make My Heart Go" (Havin Zagross & Alex Saja feat. Ida Corr)	Christian Bergstrøm	

== See also ==
- SugaRush Beat Company
