= Output (album) =

Studio album by Fedde le Grand
- Released: 14 September 2009
- Recorded: 2007–2009
- Genre: House, electro house
- Length: 54:19
- Label: Flamingo Recordings, Lifted House
- Producer: Fedde le Grand; Robin M; Funkerman; Raf Jansen; Christian von Staffeldt; Patric La Funk

Fedde le Grand chronology
Sessions (2007)	Output (2009)	Something Real (2016)

Singles from Output
- 1. "3 Minutes to Explain" Released: 13 August 2008; 2. "Scared of Me" Released: 18 May 2009; 3. "Output" Released: 24 July 2009; 4. "Let Me Be Real" Released: 28 August 2009; 5. "Back & Forth" Released: 26 February 2010; 6. "New Life" Released: 31 May 2010

Professional ratings
Review scores
Source	Rating
mix1	7/8 stars
URB	4/5 stars

Output is the debut album by Dutch DJ and producer Fedde le Grand. Fedde produced all songs on the album with co-production from Robin M, Funkerman, Raf Jansen, Christian von Staffeldt and Patric La Funk.

The album was released internationally on 14 September 2009 containing 12 tracks and the bonus track "New Life". The album was first released in the Netherlands, Scandinavia, Hungary, Russia, Japan and Australia. It was also released in countries such as South Africa, Venezuela, United States, Italy and Germany later that year. The Japanese, Australian and German editions of the album contain bonus tracks such as the previous released singles including "Let Me Think About It" (remix of an Ida Corr song) and "The Creeps" (Camille Jones song remix).

== Singles ==
- "3 Minutes to Explain" was already released in summer 2008, but due to plans to release the album Output simultaneously around the world, further single were released many months later.
- "Scared of Me", the official first single off the album, came out in May 2009
- "Output", the title track, was released as a digital single in July 2009
- "Let Me Be Real", the second major single was released in August 2009
- "Back & Forth" followed in February 2010.
- "New Life", another collaboration with Funkerman was released in May 2010.

== Track listings ==
=== Standard edition ===
No.	Title	Writer(s)	Length
1.	"Wild 'n Raw" (featuring Rob Birch)	Rob Birch, Fedde le Grand, Robin M	4:53
2.	"Feel Alive" (featuring will.i.am)	will.i.am, Fedde le Grand	4:11
3.	"Scared of Me" (featuring Mitch Crown)	Fedde le Grand, Mitch Kroon, Christian von Staffeldt, Martin Solveig, Robin M	2:47
4.	"Hard Day's Work" (featuring Ida Corr)	Ida Corr, Fedde Le Grand, Robin M	4:02
5.	"Shotgun" (featuring Camille Jones)	Camille Jones, Thor Madsen, Jeppe Saugmann, Fedde Le Grand, Robin M	6:18
6.	"Back & Forth" (featuring Mr. V)	Fedde le Grand, Mr. V	3:22
7.	"Let Me Be Real" (featuring Mitch Crown)	Fedde le Grand, Mitch Kroon, Robin M	3:20
8.	"My Faya" (featuring Andy & Dorothy Sherman)	Fedde le Grand, Dorothy Sherman, Andy Sherman	5:48
9.	"3 Minutes to Explain" (featuring Funkerman & Andy & Dorothy Sherman)	Fedde le Grand, Funkerman, Raf Jansen, Dorothy Sherman, Andy Sherman	3:41
10.	"Rockin' High" (featuring Mitch Crown)	Fedde le Grand, Mitch Kroon, Robin M	3:51
11.	"Noise Reduction" (featuring Patric la Funk)	Fedde le Grand, Patric la Funk	3:59
12.	"Output"	Fedde le Grand	4:06
13.	"New Life" (Fedde le Grand & Funkerman Re-Edit) (bonus track) (vs. Dany P-Jazz)	Gonzales DJ Pep's	4:08

Japanese edition bonus tracks
No.	Title	Length
14.	"Electric Dreams" (featuring Luciana)
15.	"Let Me Think About It" (Ida Corr vs. Fedde le Grand)
16.	"Put Your Hands Up for Detroit"

Australian edition bonus tracks
No.	Title	Length
13.	"Put Your Hands Up for Detroit" (Fedde le Grand)
14.	"The Creeps" (Camille Jones vs. Fedde le Grand)
15.	"Let Me Think About It" (Ida Corr vs. Fedde le Grand)
16.	"New Life" (Fedde le Grand & Funkerman Re-Edit) (Fedde le Grand vs. Dany P-Jazz)

=== German limited edition ===
Disc 2
No.	Title	Length
1.	"Put Your Hands Up for Detroit" (Fedde Le Grand)
2.	"Let Me Think About It" (Ida Corr vs. Fedde le Grand)
3.	"The Creeps" (Camille Jones vs. Fedde le Grand)
4.	"Keep Control Plus (Fedde Le Grand Edit)" (Sono)
5.	"Take No Shh (Radio Edit)" (Fedde le Grand presents: Flamingo)
6.	"Saturday 2009 (Fedde le Grand Vocal Mix)" (Cunnie Williams featuringl Monie Love)
7.	"Just Trippin' (Edit)" (Fedde Le Grand featuring Mc Gee)
8.	"Wheels In Motion (Radio Edit)" (Funkerman & Fedde le Grand)
9.	"Amplifier (Original Club Mix)" (F.L.G.)
10.	"Squeeze Me (Fedde le Grand Remix)" (Kraak & Smaak featuring Ben Westbeech)
11.	"C'est la Vie (Fedde vs. Martin Club Mix)" (Martin Solveig)
12.	"Ah Yeah (Edit)" (Fedde le Grand presents: Flamingo)
13.	"The Beat Is Rockin' (Fedde le Grand Remix)" (Erick E)
14.	"Get This Feeling (Radio Edit)" (Fedde le Grand)

== Music videos ==
Year	Title	Director(s)
2008	"3 Minutes to Explain"	Home8
2009	"Scared of Me"	Home8
2009	"Let Me Be Real"	Oscar Verpoort
2010	"New Life"	Final Kid

== Charts ==
Chart (2009)	Peak position
Dutch Albums (Album Top 100)	63

== Release history ==
Region	Date	Label
Netherlands	14 September 2009	Flamingo Recordings
Belgium	14 September 2009	Flamingo Recordings
Canada	14 September 2009	SPG Music
Denmark	14 September 2009	Lifted House, Disco:Wax
Finland	14 September 2009	Lifted House, Disco:Wax
Norway	14 September 2009	Lifted House, Disco:Wax
Sweden	14 September 2009	Lifted House, Disco:Wax
Hungary	14 September 2009	CLS
Russia	14 September 2009	правительство звука
Japan	15 September 2009	Avex Trax
Australia	18 September 2009	Ministry of Sound Australia
Colombia	21 September 2009	Cabeza de Ratón
Ecuador	21 September 2009	Cabeza de Ratón
Peru	21 September 2009	Cabeza de Ratón
Venezuela	21 September 2009	Cabeza de Ratón
United States	29 September 2009	Ultra
South Africa	30 September 2009	Just Music
Botswana	30 September 2009	Just Music
Lesotho	30 September 2009	Just Music
Mozambique	30 September 2009	Just Music
Namibia	30 September 2009	Just Music
Swaziland	30 September 2009	Just Music
United Kingdom	12 October 2009	Black Hole
Ireland	12 October 2009	Black Hole
Italy	16 October 2009	Net's Work Int.
Germany	26 February 2010	Kontor
Austria	26 February 2010	Kontor
Switzerland	26 February 2010	Kontor
