= Loop Live =

Music festival in Bulgaria

- Genre: Popular Music; Electronic music
- Dates: October
- Frequency: Annual
- Locations: Prince Alexander of Battenberg Square, Sofia
- Country: Bulgaria
- Years active: 2007–2009
- Founders: Loop, Radio City, City TV
- Attendance: 50,000
- Website: Loop.bg (archived)

Loop Live was an annual live music festival in Sofia, Bulgaria. It started in 2007 and continued for two years, until its last edition in 2009. It was held at Prince Alexander of Battenberg Square. It was free to attend and included new and popular artists. The festival was usually televised a week afterwards on City TV.

The festival was started in order to celebrate two years since City TV's, and one year since Loop mobile network's establishment.

The Loop mobile network brand was a celluar service by Mobiltel, targeted towards young people. It was established on the 11th of July, 2006, with Mobitel reporting that it had accrued nearly 20,000 subscribers during its first month on the market. The Loop brand frequently carried out large promotional campaigns with rewards for subscribers to the service.

During the same time period, Loop also sponsored "Welcome to the Loop" - A music tour that was held throughout June 2007 and March 2008.

== 2007 ==
- Date: 7 October 2007
- Attendance: 50,000

Line-Up

- Asle Bjorn & Anne
- Freemasons with Amanda Wilson
- Jaba of Yves La Rock
- Lumidee
- Måns Zelmerlöw
- Million Stylez
- Outlandish
- Yarabi

== 2008 ==
- Date: 5 October 2008
- Attendance: 50,000

Line-Up

- Shaggy (headlining)
- Burhan G
- DJ Andi feat. Stella
- Ida Corr feat. Burhan G
- Lexter
- Matt Pokora
- Verona

== 2009 ==
- Date: 11 October 2009
- Attendance: 50,000

Line-Up

- Kelly Rowland (headlining)
- Eddie Wata
- Guru Josh Project
- ILLmate feat. RuthVessy
- Inna
- Katerine Avgoustakis
- Miroslav Kostadinov
- Tom Boxer

== Other information ==
In 2008, singers Ida Corr and Shaggy met backstage, and decided there to collaborate on a song for Ida Corr's album Under The Sun. In 2009 "Under The Sun" (feat. Shaggy) was released as a single.

== See also ==
- List of electronic music festivals
- Live electronic music
