= Marcus Adams (director) =

British film director

Marcus Adams is a British film director. Adams has produced music videos, advertisements and full-length feature films.

After leaving school, Adams went on to study at the Ballet Rambert school and later found work as a dancer and choreographer.

In 1986, he co-founded the techno-industrial band Meat Beat Manifesto. He designed and choreographed their live shows and also directed their videos. Adams left the band in the early 1990s to focus on directing music videos full-time.

== Filmography ==
- Long Time Dead (with Lukas Haas, Joe Absolom) (2002)
- Octane (with Madeleine Stowe) (2003)
- The Marksman (with Wesley Snipes) (2005)

== Videography ==
- "Stay Another Day" - East 17 (1994)
- "Put Your Hands Up 4 Detroit" - Fedde le Grand (2006)
- "Proper Education" - Eric Prydz vs. Pink Floyd (2007)
- "Perfect (Exceeder)" - Mason vs. Princess Superstar (2007)
- "The Creeps" - Camille Jones vs. Fedde le Grand (2007)
- "I Found U" - Axwell (2007)
- "About You Now" - Sugababes (2007)
- "Rise Up" - Yves Larock (2007)
- "Let Me Think About It" - Ida Corr vs. Fedde Le Grand (2007)
