= One (Ida Corr album) =

Compilation album by Ida Corr
- Released: March 17, 2008
- Recorded: 2004–2007
- Genres: Pop, dance-pop, R&B
- Labels: Lifted House, disco:wax, Warner
- Producers: Motrack, Ida Corr, Jarrad 'Jaz' Rogers, Saska Becker

Ida Corr chronology
Robosoul (2006)	One (2008)	Under the Sun (2009)

Singles from One
- 1. "Let Me Think About It" Released: September 25, 2007; 2. "Ride My Tempo" Released: February 8, 2008

One is the international debut album by Danish singer Ida Corr and a compilation of songs from her previously released studio albums Streetdiva and Robosoul. Corr wrote or co-wrote almost all songs on the album, she also co-produced some of the songs.

The album has been released in Scandinavia on March 17, 2008 as a two-disc version, which includes the album itself and a CD with remixes of her biggest hit "Let Me Think About It". On August 26, 2008 it was released in the United States (the main album only, with a slightly altered track list). On January 13, 2009 a release in Russia through the label Soyuz followed. The album was released in Germany on October 30, 2009 through Ministry of Sound, little over a month after the release of the single "I Want You". Ida Corr plans to release One in more countries, before she releases a new album in late 2009.

== Singles ==
The following songs from the album originated as radio singles in Denmark between 2004 and 2007 and originated from the albums Streetdiva (2005) and Robosoul (2006): "U Make Me Wanna", "Make Them Beg", "Country Girl", "Late Night Bimbo" and "Lonely Girl". The Fedde Le Grand remix of "Let Me Think About It" was released 6 months before One came out. The second single "Ride My Tempo" has been released in February 2008 in Denmark and Sweden.

== Track listings ==
=== Scandinavian edition ===
Disc 1
No.	Title	Writer(s)	Length
1.	"Ride My Tempo"	Jarrad Rogers, Jade MacRae, Roscoe P. Coldchain	3:20
2.	"Late Night Bimbo"	Ida Corr, Christian von Staffeldt	2:03
3.	"U Make Me Wanna"	Saska Becker, Ida Corr, Dan Lauste	3:05
4.	"Lonely Girl"	Ida Corr, Christian von Staffeldt	3:10
5.	"Make Them Beg"	Ida Corr, Christian von Staffeldt	3:29
6.	"Let Me Think About It"	Ida Corr, Christian von Staffeldt, Burhan G	3:40
7.	"Do U Believe?"	Ida Corr, Per Ebdrup	4:04
8.	"Country Girl"	Ida Corr, Christian von Staffeldt	3:03
9.	"Mad"	Ida Corr, Christian von Staffeldt	5:08
10.	"Hurry Up and Wait"	Ida Corr, Christian von Staffeldt	2:55
11.	"I'm Your Lady"	Ida Corr, Christian von Staffeldt	3:22
12.	"Mr. JB"	Ida Corr, Christian von Staffeldt	4:13
13.	"Man for Me"	Ida Corr, Christian von Staffeldt	3:24
14.	"Hangover Time"	Ida Corr, Christian von Staffeldt	3:50
15.	"U"	Ida Corr, Christian von Staffeldt	5:09

Disc 2: Let Me Think About It (Remixes)
No.	Title	Length
1.	"Let Me Think About It" (Fedde le Grand Club Mix)	6:02
2.	"Let Me Think About It" (Funkerman Remix)	5:55
3.	"Let Me Think About It" (Eddie Thoneick Remix)	6:58
4.	"Let Me Think About It" (Patchworkz Astro Remix)	4:08
5.	"Let Me Think About It" (Micky Slim Remix)	6:42
6.	"Let Me Think About It" (Jason Herd's Jfunk Remix)	6:48
7.	"Let Me Think About It" (Gregor Salto & DJ Madskillz Remix)	7:06
8.	"Let Me Think About It" (James Talk Remix)	8:00
9.	"Let Me Think About It" (MBK Extended Mix)	5:16
10.	"Let Me Think About It" (Sidelmann Remix)	5:51

Notes:

- "Let Me Think About It" (Fedde le Grand Club Mix)": remixed by Fedde Le Grand for flamingorecords.com
- "Let Me Think About It" (Funkerman Remix): remixed by Funkerman for flamingorecords.com
- "Let Me Think About It" (Eddie Thoneick Remix): remix and additional production by Eddie Thoneick at Tonic-studios, Huelheim, Germany. Guitars by Eddie Thoneick
- "Let Me Think About It" (Patchworkz Astro Remix): produced in Copenhagen by Brian Oldenborg
- "Let Me Think About It" (Micky Slim Remix): remix and additional production by Micky Slim on behalf of 24 management
- "Let Me Think About It" (Jason Herd's Jfunk Remix): remix and additional production by Jason Herd courtesy of Jfunk Recordings. Mixed and engineered by Jason Herd. Instrumentation by Andy Hicky
- "Let Me Think About It" (Gregor Salto & DJ Madskillz Remix): remix for g-rex.com
- "Let Me Think About It" (James Talk Remix): remix and additional production by James Talk
- "Let Me Think About It" (MBK Extended Mix): remix by MBK for Lifted House
- "Let Me Think About It" (Sidelmann Remix): remix by Jesper Sidelmann for Lifted House

=== US edition ===
No.	Title	Length
1.	"Ride My Tempo" (with Rosco P. Coldchain)
2.	"Late Night Bimbo" (feat. Bow Hunt)
3.	"Lonely Girl"
4.	"Let Me Think About It" (vs. Fedde Le Grand)
5.	"Country Girl"
6.	"Mad"
7.	"I'm Your Lady"
8.	"Mr. JB"
9.	"Man for Me"
10.	"Hangover Time"
11.	"U"

=== Russian edition ===
No.	Title	Length
1.	"Let Me Think About It" (vs. Fedde Le Grand)
2.	"Ride My Tempo" (with Rosco P. Coldchain)
3.	"Late Night Bimbo" (feat. Bow Hunt)
4.	"Lonely Girl"
5.	"Make Them Beg" (feat. Al Agami)
6.	"Do U Believe?"
7.	"Country Girl"
8.	"Mad"
9.	"Hurry Up and Wait"
10.	"Hangover Time"
11.	"I'm Your Lady"
12.	"Mr. JB"
13.	"Man for Me"
14.	"Hangover Time"
15.	"U"

=== German edition ===
No.	Title	Length
1.	"Let Me Think About It" (vs. Fedde Le Grand)
2.	"Ride My Tempo" (with Rosco P. Coldchain)
3.	"Late Night Bimbo" (feat. Bow Hunt)
4.	"Lonely Girl"
5.	"Make Them Beg" (feat. Al Agami)
6.	"Do U Believe?"
7.	"Country Girl"
8.	"Mad"
9.	"Hurry Up and Wait"
10.	"I'm Your Lady"
11.	"Mr. JB"
12.	"Man for Me"
13.	"Hangover Time"
14.	"U"
15.	"I Want You"
16.	"Let Me Think About It" (Original Version feat. Burhan G (iTunes bonus track))

== Release history ==
Region	Date	Label
Denmark	March 17, 2008	Warner Music Denmark
Sweden	March 17, 2008	Warner Music Denmark
Norway	March 17, 2008	Warner Music Denmark
Finland	March 17, 2008	Warner Music Denmark
United States	August 26, 2008	Ministry of Sound US
Russia	January 13, 2009	Soyuz Russia
Germany	October 30, 2009	Ministry of Sound Germany
Austria	October 30, 2009	Ministry of Sound Germany
Switzerland	October 30, 2009	Ministry of Sound Germany
