= City Radio =

City Radio may refer to:

- City Radio (Bulgaria)
- City Radio (Croatia)

== See also ==
- Radio City (disambiguation)
