= Hardwell On Air =

Dutch online music show

- Genre: EDM
- Created by: Hardwell
- Developed by: Hardwell
- No. of episodes: 522

Production
- Running time: 60 minutes

Original release
- Network: YouTube
- Release: 2011 – 2021
- Release: 2023 – present

Hardwell On Air (HOA) is a monthly online music show hosted by Dutch DJ and record producer Hardwell. The program started as a weekly live broadcast via Hardwell's official YouTube and Facebook profiles and ran from March 4, 2011, until its closure on January 15, 2021. The show was also broadcast by many FM radio stations and online outlets, and episodes were free to download.

HOA was put on hiatus after its 500th episode. The show Revealed Selected was announced to take its place, hosted by Adam K of Tomorrowland's One World Radio.

On November 3, 2023, HOA was relaunched as a monthly YouTube livestream after a two-year dormancy. Episodes from the initial decade are archived in a playlist on Hardwell's YouTube channel.

== Concept ==
During the show, Hardwell plays newly released EDM songs in a one-hour mix. Each episode showcases new material in various genres, including big room, progressive house, electro house, and tech house. Episodes frequently conclude with a hardstyle track.

== Episode layout ==
The sets have a length of one hour and are initiated with a vocal short. This consists of a distorted voice, which introduces each episode with the same word sequence: "Are we on air? Welcome to the soundtrack of your nightlife. One hour of the present and future. Tune in to Hardwell On Air." The soundtrack of the intro consists of Hardwell's song "Encoded" (released 2011). A follow-up statement from Hardwell can be heard. Usually, one or more smoother songs follow the intro. Since 2023, the soundtrack of the intro consists of Hardwell's song Shotgun (It Ain't Over) featuring Bright Lights (released 2023).

The episodes contained the following segments:

- Hardwell Exclusive (2011–2021, 2023–present): One or more songs that will be released on Revealed Recordings and/or other Labels.
- Most Voted Track of the Week (2016–2021): Casting votes to the Hardwell's Facebook Bot.
- Demo of the Week (2016–2018): A Demo Track that was sent to Hardwell or Revealed Recordings.
- Revealed Community Pick: #- (2018–2019): 1–2 newly released tracks from Revealed Community.
- Revealed Radar: #- (2020–2021): 2–3 newly released tracks from Revealed Radar.
- Demo of the Month (2023–present): A Demo Track that was sent to Hardwell or Revealed Recordings.
- DJ on the Phone (2023–present): A particular DJ will be called for an Artist Spotlight once in a while.

After the different categories have been dealt with, the music style is mostly changed to Hardstyle or Future Bass.

== Audio tags ==
For many songs, a shout or tag referring to the podcast is added to protect the song from being used before the release is done. Regarding this, in early 2017, a video was posted online which shows Korean comedian and DJ G-Park and DJharles playing Jewelz & Sparks's "Grande Opera". During the break, Hardwell presents the track as well as the "Hardwell On Air tag" can be heard just before the drop starts. This indicated that the duo illegally recorded the track from the podcast. Since then, a running gag, the duo has played the track in combination with the "Hardwell on Air tag". On June 14, 2017, Jewelz & Sparks played their track "Grande Opera" with the Hardwell on Air sample again at the Ultra Music Festival in Korea, and also posted it to Facebook.

== Channels ==
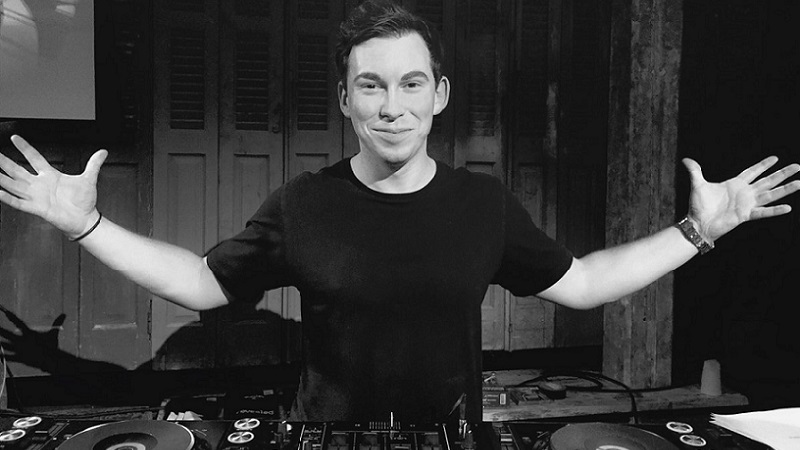
Hardwell during the special 300th episode.

- Radio FG Belgique, Antwerp, Belgium
- Rádio Energia 97 FM, São Paulo, Brazil
- Alpha Radio, Warna, Bulgaria
- ICRT, Taipei, Taiwan
- Kick FM, Gelsenkirchen, Germany
- sunshine live, Mannheim, Germany
- DJ FM, Toronto, Canada
- Dix FM, Bogotá, Colombia
- Slam!FM, Hilversum, Netherlands
- Radio 538, Hilversum, Netherlands
- Dolfijn FM, Willemstad, Aruba
- UP FM, Manukau City, New Zealand
- Mega Hits, Lisbon, Portugal
- Радио Рекорд, St. Petersburg, Russia
- Radio Ambrosio, Lineares, Chile
- Radio One Mallorca, Palma de Mallorca, Spain
- Kiss 91.75 FM, Pattaya, Thailand
- Mix FM, Beirut, Lebanon
- Indigo 91.9 FM, Bangalore, India
- Alfa Radio 104.1, Guayaquil, Ecuador
- Hitz FM, Malaysia
- Reef FM, Tenerife
- BPM Channel 51, SiriusXM
- 99.5 Play FM, Manila, Philippines
- 1Mix online radio, Isle of Man
- 106.1 Geronimo, Indonesia
- CRI Hit FM, China (Beijing, Shanghai and Guangzhou)
- Radio La Marka 90.9 FM, Nicaragua
- Freakhouse on Air, South Korea
- Fame 95 FM (InDaHouse Radio), Jamaica
- More 94FM (InDaHouse Radio), Bahamas
- Radio1 FM88, Rhodes, Greece
- Hit Radio Network, Morocco/central Africa
- MB Music Radio, Constanța, Romania
- 101.5 Volgograd FM, Oblast, Volgograd, Russia
- 105.7 Metro, Queensland, Australia
- Radio WOW (Superstar DJ Show), Friuli-Venezia Giulia, Italy
- Rouge FM (Rouge Platine), Lausanne, Switzerland
- 90.3 Delta FM, Buenos Aires
- Kiss FM Australia
- Radio NRJ, France/Finland/Germany/Austria/Cyprus
- TopRadio, Flemish Belgium
- Europa FM, Spain, Canary Islands, & Ibiza
- EnterZagreb.HR, Croatia
- Capital Radio 93.8, Cyprus
- Future Groove Online Radio, Tokyo
- Deejay FM, Tegucigalpa, Honduras
- Beat 100.9, Mexico City
- 104.3 Kick FM, Puebla, Mexico
- Kiss FM Ukraine
- 88 FM City Radio, Tirana, Albania
- RadioEX Online Radio, Kiev, Ukraine
- Radio Delirio, Tacuarembo, Uruguay
- Radio Electro Vibe (Online), Oscasco, Brazil
- Big Radio 3, Bosnia
- Freeminded Online Radio, Amsterdam
- DDM Online Radio, Ireland
- Fuzed Club Radio San Juan, Puerto Rico
- Radio Hits 88.2, Cairo
- Ultrastacion Radio Venezuela
- Infinite Radio, Santa Barbara, Honduras
- Radio One 103.9, Curacao
- Unika FM, Madrid
- Hits 1 Online, Toulouse, France
- Hot Hits Online, UK
- Radio 538, Colombia
- Radio Nova, Bulgaria
- 95.7 Radyo S, Bursa, Turkey
- 104.2 Warm FM, Liège, Belgium
- Trendy FM, Limburg (Belgium)
- Big City Beats, Germany
- Radio Morabeza, Cape Verde
- Radio-Smash, Tunisia
- My 95.9, Honolulu, US
- Sonic.FM, Argentina
- Lumix FM, Moscow
- Radio Utopia, Lagos, Portugal
- DJ Frenzy Online, Ontario, Canada
- Block FM, Japan
- FutureGroove FM, Tokyo

== Awards and nominations ==
Certification	Category	Year	Result	Source
IDMA	Best Podcast	2013	Nominated	
IDMA	Best Podcast or Radio Mixshow DJ	2014	Nominated	
IDMA	Best Podcast or Radio Mixshow DJ	2015	Won	
IDMA	Best Podcast or Radio Mixshow DJ	2016	Won	
