= Singled Out (disambiguation) =

Singled Out is an American TV game show 1995–1998.

Singled Out may also refer to: Phrasal verbs – means choose one person or a thing from group of people or things.

== Music ==
- Singled Out (Diesel album), 2004
- Singled Out (Eleanor McEvoy album), 2009
- Singled Out (Shakin' Stevens album), 2020
- Singled Out, a 2012 album by Ida Corr
- "Singled Out", a song by A-Teens from the 2002 album Pop 'til You Drop!
- "Singled Out", a song by New Found Glory song from the 2002 album Sticks and Stones

== Other uses ==
- "Singled Out" (comics), a comic strip in the UK comic The Beano
- "Singled Out" (NCIS), an episode of NCIS season 4
- "Singled Out", a season 4 episode of The Loud House
