= Ride My Tempo =

Single by Ida Corr

from the album One
- Released: 8 February 2008
- Recorded: 2007
- Genre: Dance-pop; house; R&B
- Length: 3:20 (radio edit)
- Label: Lifted House; Ministry of Sound
- Songwriter(s): Jarrad Rogers; Ida Corr; Jade Macrae; Roscoe P. Coldchain
- Producer(s): Jarrad Rogers

Ida Corr singles chronology
"Let Me Think About It" (2007)	"Ride My Tempo" (2008)	"Time" (2009)

Music video
- "Ride My Tempo" on YouTube

"Ride My Tempo" is the second single from Ida Corr's international debut album One. The song was written by Jarrad "Jaz" Rogers and Ida Corr of SugaRush Beat Company, Jade Macrae and Rosco P. Coldchain for the album. It features vocals by Ida Corr and a rap by Rosco P. Coldchain.

== Song information ==
The single was released as a download and physical single in February 2008 in Denmark and Sweden. Throughout the year 2008 it was also released in France, Germany and Italy on vinyl. On 22 January 2009 "Ride My Tempo" reached number one on the German Dance Chart. It stayed for six weeks on this position. On 17 April the single was officially released on CD and as a download via Ministry of Sound in Germany. The Wideboys contributed two remixes to this single.

== Music video ==
The music video to the single premiered in March 2009 on the Ministry of Sound Germany YouTube channel. The video, produced by Danish director Michael Larsen, is inspired by James Bond film title sequences, especially the 1962 film Dr. No. It features Corr singing the lyrics in different outfits (including a black catsuit and dress). On 3 April the video premiered on the German music channel VIVA. It was later sent to other German music channels as well, however MTV Germany refused to play it.

== Track listing ==
Danish CD and download

1. "Ride My Tempo" (Radio Edit)
2. "Ride My Tempo" (Extended Version)
3. "Ride My Tempo" (Patchworkz Radio Edit)
4. "Ride My Tempo" (Patchworkz Extended)
5. "Ride My Tempo" (Rix Del Rio & Patchworkz Mix)
6. "Ride My Tempo" (Oliver Lang Dojo Mix)
7. "Ride My Tempo" (Deeper People Remix)
8. "Ride My Tempo" (Grazehopp Radio)
9. "Ride My Tempo" (Grazehopp Club Mix)
10. "Ride My Tempo" (Grazehopp Dub Mix)

Italian CD and download

1. "Ride My Tempo" (Radio Edit)
2. "Ride My Tempo" (Extended Version)
3. "Ride My Tempo" (Deeper People Remix)
4. "Ride My Tempo" (Patchworkz Extended)
5. "Ride My Tempo" (Wideboys Club Mix)

German download

1. "Ride My Tempo" (Radio Edit)
2. "Ride My Tempo" (Extended Version)
3. "Ride My Tempo" (Patchworkz Radio Edit)
4. "Ride My Tempo" (Patchworkz Extended)
5. "Ride My Tempo" (Rix Del Rio & Patchworkz Mix)
6. "Ride My Tempo" (Oliver Lang Dojo Mix)
7. "Ride My Tempo" (Deeper People Remix)
8. "Ride My Tempo" (Grazehopp Radio)
9. "Ride My Tempo" (Grazehopp Dub Mix)
10. "Ride My Tempo" (Wideboys Mix Radio Edit)
11. "Ride My Tempo" (Wideboys Mix Full Club)
12. "Ride My Tempo" (Wideboys Mix Dub)
13. "Ride My Tempo" (Wideboys London Mix Radio)
14. "Ride My Tempo" (Wideboys London Mix)
15. "Ride My Tempo" (Davey Boy Remix)

German CD maxi single

1. "Ride My Tempo" (Radio Edit)
2. "Ride My Tempo" (Patchworkz Radio Edit)
3. "Ride My Tempo" (Wideboys London Mix Radio)
4. "Ride My Tempo" (Oliver Lang Dojo Mix)
5. "Ride My Tempo" (Deeper People Remix)
6. "Ride My Tempo" (Grazehopp Club Mix)

US digital single

1. "Ride My Tempo" (Radio Edit)
2. "Ride My Tempo" (Wideboys Radio Edit)
3. "Ride My Tempo" (Grazehopp Radio Edit)
4. "Ride My Tempo" (Starkillers Remix)
5. "Ride My Tempo" (Grazehopp Club Mix)

Dirty Soul digital single (worldwide)

1. "Ride My Tempo" (Extended Version)
2. "Ride My Tempo" (Patchworkz Extended)
3. "Ride My Tempo" (Rix Del Rio & Patchworkz Mix)
4. "Ride My Tempo" (Oliver Lang Dojo Mix)
5. "Ride My Tempo" (Grazehopp Club Mix)

Dirty Soul "The Remixes" digital single (worldwide)

1. "Ride My Tempo" (Pacific & Vandyck Remix)
2. "Ride My Tempo" (Essential Groovers feat Justin Ferier Remix)

== Charts ==
Chart (2008–09)	Peak position
Denmark (Tracklisten)	8
Germany (GfK)	54
Sweden (Sverigetopplistan)	28

== Release history ==
Region	Date
Denmark	8 February 2008
Sweden	16 February 2008
Finland	12 May 2008
Italy	2008
Germany	17 April 2009
Austria	17 April 2009
Switzerland	17 April 2009
France	2009
Various	11 May 2009
United States	26 May 2009
