= Dannic =

Dutch DJ and EDM producer

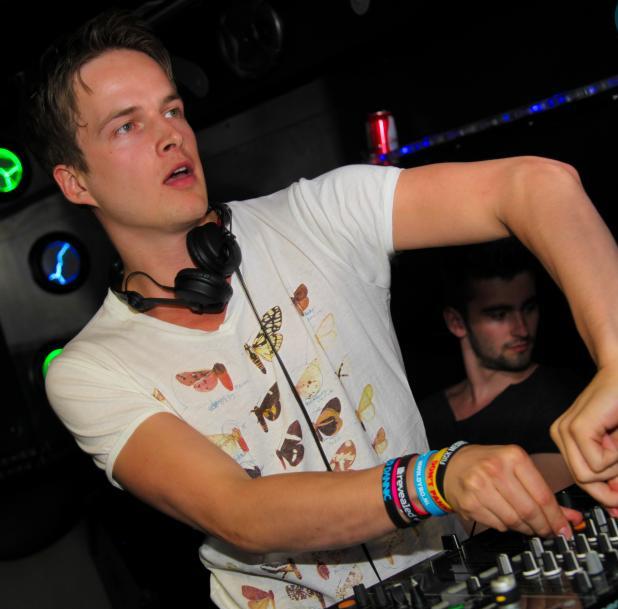

Background information
- Also known as: DJ Funkadelic; Brainless
- Born: Daan Romers; 10 November 1985 (age 40); Breda, North Brabant, Netherlands
- Genres: Electro house; big room house; progressive house
- Occupations: DJ; record producer
- Instrument: Digital audio workstation
- Years active: 2009 - present
- Labels: Revealed Recordings; Ultra; Fonk Recordings; Maxximize Records; Spinnin'; Armada Music
- Website: Official website

Daan Romers (Dutch pronunciation: [daːn ˈroːmərs]; born 10 November 1985), better known by his stage name Dannic (stylized as DɅNNIC), is a Dutch DJ and EDM producer. He is known for his work in collaborations with Hardwell, Dyro and Sick Individuals, and publishes his music through the record label Revealed Recordings and his own label Fonk Recordings.

As of 2013, he has a radio show called Front of House. In DJ Mag's Top 100 DJs, he is placed #70.

In 2015, he founded his own label, Fonk Recordings to support up-and-coming artists with their works and released tracks under the label name in 2016.

== Career ==
=== 2009-12 ===
He started his career in 2009 and became famous off the Dancetour remix competition for Dutch deep house artist Funkerman, with a track he made with Shermanology titled 'Automatic.' In 2010, Daan Romers released tracks on Revealed Recordings under the names Funkadelic and Brainless until his track 'Doster', at which point he switched his name to Dannic because Funkadelic was a band in the '70s.

=== 2013-14 ===
In DJ Mag 2013 he was placed #74 in the top 100. In 2014 his place changed drastically by becoming the #30 DJ in the world following his best friend Dyro's #30 spot in 2013.

=== 2015 ===
In 2015, Dannic was ranked #26 best DJ in the world, ahead of Dyro by one spot. On 13 October 2015 he announced the creation of his own independent label Fonk Recordings, named after his 2015 track Fonk which was released under Hardwell's label Revealed Recordings. Dannic's label aims to help young artists, to guide them and give them a platform. During the announcement he said:-

“I really like to help younger producers with both their mastering, and offering more general production advice to allow them to finish their tracks. Throughout the years I’ve been working with a few talents and now I’m in the position to push them and give them a platform.”

=== 2016 ===
Tracks will be released under the label name during early 2016.

On 23 January 2016 Dannic released the track, "Jungle" as a free download.

== Discography ==
=== Compilations ===
- 2012: Dannic Bootleg Pack 2012 [Free]
- 2012: The Sound of Revealed (Mixed by Dannic and Dyro) [Revealed Recordings]
- 2013: Toolroom Knights (Mixed by Dannic) [Toolroom Records]
- 2016: Dannic Presents Fonk (Fonk Recordings)
- 2017: The Hits (Red Beat International)

=== Extended plays ===
- 2014: Dannic Selection Part 1
- 2015: Dannic Selection Part 2
- 2015: Dannic Selection Part 3
- 2021: Baila

=== Singles ===
- 2010: Hardwell and DJ Funkadelic – Get Down Girl [Revealed Recordings]
- 2011: Brainless – Stoemp (Original Mix) [AVANTI Records]
- 2011: Brainless – Bots (Original Mix) [Revealed Recordings]
- 2011: Brainless – Slap (Original Mix) [Revealed Recordings]
- 2011: DJ Funkadelic and Beauriche featuring Taleen - Subway [Songbird]
- 2011: DJ Funkadelic – Smack (Original Mix) [Revealed Recordings]
- 2011: DJ Funkadelic and Beauriche – Spank [Revealed Recordings]
- 2012: Dannic – Doster [Revealed Recordings]
- 2012: Hardwell and Dannic – Kontiki [Revealed Recordings]
- 2012: Dannic – W.O.P. (Riverdance Festival 2012 Anthem) [Revealed Recordings]
- 2012: Dannic - Pipeline [CR2 Records]
- 2012: Dannic – Tombo [Revealed Recordings]
- 2012: Jordy Dazz and Dannic – Fuego [Revealed Recordings]
- 2012: Dannic – Flare [Revealed Recordings]
- 2013: Dannic – Clobber [Toolroom Records]
- 2013: Dannic – Viper [Revealed Recordings]
- 2013: Dannic – Ignite [Toolroom Records]
- 2013: Dannic – Rocker [Revealed Recordings]
- 2013: Dannic – Bring the Funk [Toolroom Records]
- 2013: Dannic and Sick Individuals – Blueprint [Revealed Recordings]
- 2014: Dannic - Lion [Revealed Recordings]
- 2014: Dannic featuring Bright Lights - Dear Life [Revealed Recordings]
- 2014: Dannic vs Merk & Kremont - Anubi [Revealed Recordings]
- 2014: Dyro and Dannic - Radical [Revealed Recordings]
- 2014: Dannic - Zenith [Revealed Recordings]
- 2014: Dannic and TV Noise - Solid [Revealed Recordings]
- 2014: Dannic and Shermanology - Wait for You [Revealed Recordings]
- 2015: Dannic and Lucky Date featuring Harrison - Mayday [Revealed Recordings]
- 2015: Dannic - Fonk [Revealed Recordings]
- 2015: Dannic featuring Bright Lights - Forever [Revealed Recordings]
- 2015: Hardwell and Dannic featuring Haris - Survivors [Revealed Recordings]
- 2015: Dannic vs Tom and Jame - Clap [Revealed Recordings]
- 2015: Dannic and Sick Individuals - Feel Your Love [Revealed Recordings]
- 2016: Dannic - Jungle [Free Download]
- 2016: Dannic and HIIO - Funky Time [Fonk Recordings]
- 2016: Dannic featuring Airto - Light The Sky [Revealed Recordings]
- 2016: Dannic and Amersy - Lights Out [Fonk Recordings]
- 2016: Dannic - Can You Feel It [Fonk Recordings / Free Download]
- 2016: Dannic - Blaze [Revealed Recordings]
- 2016: Dannic and Jane XØ - Undone [Free Download]
- 2016: Dannic vs Merk and Kremont featuring Duane Harden - Music [Fonk Recordings]
- 2016: Dannic and We AM - Move [Fonk Recordings]
- 2017: Dannic and DBSTF - Noise [Maxximize Records (Spinnin')]
- 2017: Dannic - Fonk It Up [Fonk Recordings]
- 2017: Dannic and Promise Land - House It (For The Love Of) [Fonk Recordings]
- 2017: Dannic vs Tom and Jame - Ready [Maxximize Records (Spinnin')]
- 2017: Dannic - Breakdown [Fonk Recordings / Free Download]
- 2017: Fedde Le Grand and Dannic vs CoCo Star - Coco's Miracle [Spinnin' Records]
- 2017: Dannic - Rockin [Fonk Recordings]
- 2017: Dannic featuring Mahkenna - Alive [Bigmgmt Records]
- 2017: Dannic and Pessto - All The Things [Fonk Recordings]
- 2018: Dannic vs Silvio Ecomo - In No Dip [Spinnin' Records]
- 2018: Dannic featuring INNA - Stay [Spinnin' Records]
- 2018: Dannic and Teamworx - NRG [Fonk Recordings (Spinnin')]
- 2018: Dannic and Rob & Jack - Bring Di Fire [Fonk Recordings (Spinnin')]
- 2018: Dannic featuring Polina Griffith - Falling in Love (SOS) [Spinnin' Records]
- 2018: Dannic - Clash [Fonk Recordings (Spinnin')]
- 2018: Dannic - Tenderlove [Spinnin' Records]
- 2018: Dannic and Thomas Newson - No More [Fonk Recordings (Spinnin')]
- 2018: Dannic and HunterSynth - Higher [Fonk Recordings (Spinnin')]
- 2019: Dannic - Puma [Fonk Recordings (Spinnin') / Free Download]
- 2019: Dannic and Hardwell featuring Kelli-Leigh - Chase The Sun [Revealed Recordings]
- 2019: Dannic - Tell Me (If You Really Love Me) [Spinnin' Records]
- 2019: Dannic and Promise Land - Over (Zonderling Edit) [Heldeep Records (Spinnin')]
- 2019: Dannic - Whip [Fonk Recordings (Spinnin')]
- 2019: Dannic and Bougenvilla - Ctrl Alt Del [Fonk Recordings (Spinnin')]
- 2019: Dannic and Harrison - Burn Me Down [Revealed Music]
- 2019: Dannic and Teamworx - Bump N' Roll [Fonk Recordings (Spinnin')]
- 2019: Dannic and Graham Swift - True Champion [Fonk Recordings (Spinnin')]
- 2019: Dannic - Wobble [Self-released]
- 2020: Dannic and Tom & Jame - Rock Right Now [Fonk Recordings (076 Records)]
- 2020: Dannic - Feeling Kinda Strange [Spinnin' Records]
- 2020: Dannic and Rumors featuring Sweedish - Fighters Do [Spinnin’ Records]
- 2020: Dannic - Baila [Fonk Recordings]
- 2020: Dannic - Keep It Going [Fonk Recordings]
- 2020: Dannic - Pump It Up [Fonk Recordings]
- 2021: Dannic - Let You Down [Future House Music]
- 2021: Dannic featuring Dyson - Real Love [Hexagon]

=== Remixes ===
- 2009: Funkerman featuring Shemanology - "Automatic" (DJ Funkadelic Remix)
- 2012: Helena featuring Mr Wilson - "Girl from the Sky" (Dannic Remix)
- 2012: Franky Rizardo and Roul and Doors - "Elements" (Hardwell and Dannic Remix)
- 2012: Arty, Nadia Ali & BT - "Must Be the Love" (Dannic Remix)
- 2012: Nicky Romero and NERVO - "Like Home" (Dannic Remix)
- 2013: Mako - "Beam" (Dannic Mix)
- 2013: The Wanted - "We Own The Night" (Dannic Remix)
- 2013: Armin van Buuren featuring Miri Ben-Ari - "Intense" (Dannic Remix)
- 2015: Andrew Rayel - "Dark Warrior" (Dannic Remix)
- 2015: BYNON and Domeno featuring Alice Berg - "Golden Hearts" (Dannic Edit)
- 2016: We AM - "Make It Go" (Dannic Edit)
- 2016: Holl and Rush - "Pheromones" (Dannic Edit)
- 2016: Mako - "Into The Sunset" (Dannic Remix)
- 2016: Alesso featuring Nico & Vinz - "I Wanna Know" (Dannic Bootleg)
- 2017: Rayven and Valexx - "Old School" (Dannic Edit)
- 2018: Cash Cash featuring Nikki Vianna - "Jewel" (Dannic Remix)
- 2018: Le Shuuk and Max Lean featuring Tosh - "Stop" (Dannic Remix)
- 2018: Dannic featuring Inna - "Stay" (Dannic and LoaX Remix)
- 2018: The Knocks featuring Method Man - "Goodbyes" (Dannic Remix)
- 2019: Laidback Luke and Gregor Salto - "Step by Step" (Dannic Remix)
- 2020: Dannic - "Beatroot" (Dannic's Bigroom Edit)
- 2021: Laidback Luke featuring Ally Brooke - "Dance It Off" (Dannic at the Disco Remix)
- 2021: Dance Nation - "Sunshine" (Dannic Remix)
