= Shermanology =

Dutch EDM artist duo

- Origin: Curaçao, Netherlands
- Genres: Progressive house; electro house; house; future house
- Years active: 2009–present
- Labels: D'eaupe, Defected, Spinnin', Revealed Recordings, Wall Recordings, Rawthentic
- Members: Andy Sherman; Dorothy Sherman
- Past members: Leon Sherman
- Website: shermanology.com/

Shermanology is a duo of Dutch electronic artists from Curaçao. Consisting of brother Andy Sherman and sister Dorothy Sherman, it was formed in 2009. Both siblings are DJs, singers, and producers.

Shermanology has accumulated over 250 million Spotify streams. Their performances include appearances at Kappa Futur Festival, the Martinez Brothers-curated Cuttin Headz, Miami's LaLaLand Festival, UK dance festival Beat-Herder, and Rio's The Town.

Their independent release "Boyz N Da Club" was labeled the 'Hottest Record in the World' by Annie Mac on BBC Radio One. Shermanology has released on labels such as Defected, Demand, Cuttin Headz, and Hot Creations. They have also collaborated with FISHER on "It's A Killa" under his Catch & Release label and provided remixes for house performers Todd Edwards, Rudimental, and Tiesto.

Shermanology has collaborated with 90s R&B group Boyz II Men in a reimagined house rendition of their hit "Motownphilly", released on Three Six Zero Records.

== Background ==
Andy and Dorothy Sherman are the son and daughter of singer Tony Sherman who enjoyed popularity with a string of hits in the 1970s and 1980s.

Andy Sherman was involved with the musical outfit Artful Dodger in the early 2000s. He was the MC after the departure of Craig David.

== Discography ==
=== Charting singles ===
Year	Title	Peak chart positions												Album
Year	Title	NLD	AUS	AUT	BEL (Vl)	BEL (Wa)	CAN	FRA	GER	IRL	SWE	SWI	UK	Album
2009	"Automatic" (with Funkerman)	—	—	—	23^{[A]}	—	—	—	—	—	—	—	—	Non-album singles
2010	"The Weather"	—	—	—	22^{[A]}	—	—	—	—	—	—	—	—	Non-album singles
2011	"Waiting for You" (with The Shapeshifters)	—	—	—	39^{[B]}	—	—	—	—	—	—	—	—	Non-album singles
2011	"Blessed" (with Tom Hangs)	22	—	—	56^{[B]}	25^{[C]}	—	69	50	—	—	—	—	Non-album singles
2012	"Can't Stop Me" (with Afrojack)	8	—	—	75^{[B]}	24^{[C]}	—	—	—	—	—	—	—	Non-album singles
2014	"Can't You See" (with GRX)	—	—	—	13^{[D]}	12^{[D]}	—	—	—	—	—	—	—	Non-album singles
"—" denotes a recording that did not chart or was not released in that territory.														Non-album singles

=== Extended plays ===
Title	Release date	Record label	Additional information
The Phylosophy	2015	Dirty Soul Music	Includes What You Wanna Do and Sweet Surrender
Soldier March	2020	Rawthentic	
Bon Bini	2020	Hot Creations	Includes Bon Bini, OK - Cool - Aight, and Breathe
Champion Sound	2021	Rawthentic	
Lose My Mind	2022	Edible	
Guitarra	2022	D'Eaupe	
Souljack EP	2022	ElRow Music	
Roots EP, Pt. 1	2023	D'Eaupe	Includes Hijos De La Noche and Coco Loco
Roots EP	2023	D'Eaupe	Includes Hijos De La Noche, Jabula, and Coco Loco
Roots EP (The Remixes)	2024	D'Eaupe	

=== Singles ===
Title	Released	Record label	Additional information
Hey You	2009	Dirty Dutch Music	
The Weather	2010	Flamingo Recordings	
I Don't Know Part 1	2010	Sneakerz MUZIK	with Yves Larock
I Don't Know Part 2	2010	Sneakerz MUZIK	with Yves Larock
Time Will Tell	2010	Rodeo Media	
Waiting For You	2011	Defected	with The Shapeshifters
Blessed (Avicii Edit)	2011	Spinnin' Records	with Tom Hangs
Grindin	2011	Wall Recordings	
Ring The Alarm	2011	Spinnin' Records	
Can't Stop Me	2012	Wall Recordings	with Afrojack
Living 4 The City	2012	Wall Recordings	with R3hab
The Only Way	2013	Wall Recordings	
Who We Are	2013	Spinnin' Records	
Revolution Of Love	2013	Wall Recordings	
Can't You See	2014	Spinnin' Records	with GRX (Martin Garrix)
Pinball	2014	Wall Recordings	with John Christian and Oliver Rosa
3 Minutes To Explain (Funkerman Fame Mix)	2014	Flamingo Recordings	with Fedde Le Grand and Funkerman
Wait For You	2014	Revealed Recordings	with Dannic
I Want You	2015	Work Records	
Sweet Surrender	2015	Be Yourself	
Sugar	2015	Spinnin' Deep	
Hide & Seek	2016	Heldeep Records	with Mr. Belt and Wezol
Follow Me	2016	Armada	
Movin' Too Fast	2016	Armada	
Silly Games	2016	Dirty Soul Music	
Amen	2020	Altra Moda Music	with Funkerman
It's a Killa	2022	Catch & Release	with Fisher
Harder (with Busta Rhymes) - Shermanology Remix	2022	Lion Babe Music LLC	with Lion Babe and Busta Rhymes
Tell You What It Is	2022	Three Six Zero Recordings / Ministry of Sound Recordings	with Eats Everything
Can't Let Go	2023	D'Eaupe	with The Godfather and Tony Sherman
Sometimes	2023	Defected Records	
Show Me a Sign (Shermanology Remix) [feat. Conquer Jones]	2023	Defected Records	with Todd Edwards and Conquer Jones
Motown Philly	2023	Three Six Zero Recordings	with Boyz II Men
U Got Me	2024	D'Eaupe	
Rain	2024	Defected Records	with Todd Edwards and Rudimental
