= Tony Sherman =

Dutch singer

- Also known as: Tony Shearman
- Born: Renold Shearman
- Origin: Curaçao, Holland
- Genres: Soul, funk, pop
- Occupation: Singer
- Instrument: Voice
- Labels: BASF, Red Nose, Hansa International, International AZ, Music International, Trova, Bovema Negram, Discophon, Disc' AZ International, Ariola, IMC, High Fashion Music, Dureco
- Formerly of: Reality, Tony and Reality, The Sherman Brothers

Tony Sherman is a Dutch singer who had a string of hits in the 1970s and 1980s. He began with the top ten hit "Tonight".

== Background ==
Tony Sherman was originally from Curaçao. From the 1970s onwards, he was based in Holland. He was a member of the early 1970s funk group Reality. On their record album he was billed as Renold Shearman. Going solo, he released his album in 1973. His song "Tonight" which was released on the BASF label was a hit for him.

He is the father of musical artist Andy Sherman who was the lead singer of the group Artful Dodger. His son Andy along with daughter Dorothy make up the duo Shermanology.

== Solo career ==
=== 1970s to 1980s ===
Tony Sherman's first hit in the Netherlands was "Tonight" which got to no. 10 in 1974 and spent a total of nine weeks in the chart. Competing with a song of the same name by The Rubettes, it got into the Top Ten in Belgium where it peaked at no. 6 in September. Also that year he released a disco single "I Wrote You a Letter". It peaked at no. 12 and spent a total of seven weeks in the Dutch Top 40.

In 1975 he released the single "Sing With Me" b which entered the Dutch charts on 24 May 1975 It peaked at no. 11 and spent a total of five weeks in the chart. It also made the Top Ten in Belgium where it got to no. 9 in July. With the song being his third hit, he also had his first album released which got a good reception. He had also acquired the nickname the Dutch Stevie Wonder.

In 1978 he had a single, "You Love Me Too" issued on the Demand label (cat# 45-003), a small label which also issued recordings by Johnny Porrazzo, Brown Sugar, Freddie Cole and Anita Ortez.

In 1982, he had a hit with "Ellovee-Ee" which got to no. 49 and spent a week in the Dutch charts. It would later be used in The Really Wild Show.

=== 1990s to 2000s ===
He had a maxi single, "Who's the One for Me" released in 1990.

In 2009, he had a maxi single, "Only Love Can Save Me" released.

== The Sherman Brothers ==
The group had an album The Best of Tony Sherman & the Sherman Brothers released in 1976.

A single "I Wrote a Letter" bw "Tonight" credited to Tony Sherman & the Sherman Brothers was released in 1978. It was also released in Australia on the M7 label, cat# MS 268.

One of their albums, a self-titled release on the Mir label was issued in Venezuela, cat# 18443 in 1986.
