= Encoded (composition) =

Single by Hardwell

from the album Hardwell Presents Revealed Volume 2
- Released: 18 April 2011
- Genre: Trouse
- Length: 3:25 (radio edit); 6:34 (original mix)
- Label: Revealed; Cloud 9 Dance
- Songwriter: Robbert van de Corput
- Producer: Hardwell

Hardwell singles chronology
"Zero 76" (2011)	"Encoded" (2011)	"Cobra" (2011)

"Encoded" is an instrumental composition by Dutch DJ and music producer Hardwell. It was released on 2 May 2011 by Revealed Recordings in the Netherlands. It is the second single from Hardwell's compilation, Hardwell Presents Revealed Volume 2. It was the soundtrack of the introduction for every Hardwell On Air radio show episode.

== Critical review ==
10 years after the release of the track, Jake Gable from webmedia We Rave You thinks that "Encoded" is "one of [Hardwell's] biggest hits of all time".

== Music video ==
A music video for the song was published on 18 April 2011 by Hardwell's Youtube channel.

== Track listing ==
Netherlands - Digital download - Revealed (REVR011)

1. "Encoded" (Original Mix) – 6:34
2. "Encoded" (Dada Life Remix) – 5:15

Netherlands - CD - Revealed (REVR011)

1. "Encoded" (Radio Edit) – 3:25
2. "Encoded" (Original Mix) – 6:34

== Charts ==
Chart (2011)	Peak position
Netherlands (Dutch Dance Top 30)	25
