= Cobra (composition) =

Single by Hardwell
- Released: 10 October 2011
- Genre: Big room house
- Length: 6:46 (Official Anthem); 3:01 (radio edit)
- Label: Revealed; Cloud 9 Dance
- Songwriter: Robbert van de Corput
- Producer: Hardwell

Hardwell singles chronology
"Encoded" (2011)	"Cobra" (2011)	"Spaceman" (2012)

Energy anthems singles chronology
"Classified" (2011)	"Cobra" (2012)	"Firefaces" (2013)

"Cobra" is an instrumental composition by Dutch disc jockey and producer Hardwell. It was released on 10 October 2011 by Revealed Recordings in the Netherlands. The track is the 2012 official anthem of Dutch festival Energy.

== Critical reception ==
According to Danny Golpanian from Dancing Astronaut, "Cobra" "exhibits Hardwell’s power driven synths that give the track its anthemic boundaries." 7 years after the release of "Cobra", Jake Gable from We Rave You considered that "Cobra" "fused vibrant chord patterns with rich hooks to create a huge festival thumper." Further, for the 10th anniversary of the track, Dylan Smith from EDM House Network gives a good review, claiming that "Cobra" "is a more than worthy successor to all previous chart-stormers, kicking in with a big chord theme and building an explosive amount of tension — till it all breaks and the climax unfolds an electro bassline monster, unexpected but fierce and powerful just like a Cobra. The track’s finale lets all elements come together, making 'Cobra' a sure-shot at dance floor damage."

== Music video ==
The music video of the song was released on 24 December 2011.

== Track listing ==
Digital Download (REVR021)

1. "Cobra" (Official Energy Anthem 2012) - 6:46

Digital Download (REVR021)

1. "Cobra" (Radio Edit) - 3:01

== Charts ==
Chart (2012)	Peak position
Netherlands (Dutch Top 40)	35
Netherlands (Single Top 100)	51
