= Radio City =

Radio City may refer to:

== Radio stations ==
- Hits Radio Liverpool, an Independent radio station in Liverpool, previously known as Radio City
  - Greatest Hits Radio Liverpool & The North West a secondary station to the Liverpool-based Radio City, formerly Radio City 2
  - Radio City 3, a defunct sister station to Radio City, carrying a localised output from The Hits
  - Radio City Talk, a defunct speech-led sister station to Radio City.
  - Radio City Tower, a radio and observation tower in Liverpool
- Radio City (pirate radio station), British
- Radio City (Bulgaria), Bulgarian CHR network station
- Radio City (Indian radio station), India
- Radio City, Maribor, Slovenia
- Radio City 1386AM, a hospital radio station in Swansea, Wales

== NBC studios ==
6 different NBC production facility locations were given the name "Radio City":

- NBC Radio City Studios, the NYC broadcast complex at 30 Rockefeller Plaza
- NBC Radio City Chicago, NBC Tower
- NBC Radio City Washington, D.C., WTEM§WRC_era
- NBC Radio City Denver, KOA (AM)
- NBC Radio City San Francisco, where NBC first operated its West Coast NBC Orange Network
- NBC Radio City Hollywood, where NBC later operated its West Coast NBC Orange Network
- NBC Color City Studios Burbank, where NBC operated its Color Television network

== Theaters ==
- Radio City Music Hall, a theater at 30 Rockefeller Plaza
- Radio City Cinema (Tehran), a cinema that opened on 18 September 1958 in Tehran

== Albums ==
- Radio City (album), 1974 album by Big Star
