= City TV (Bulgaria) =

Bulgarian television music channel

- Country: Bulgaria
- Broadcast area: Bulgaria
- Headquarters: Sofia

Programming
- Language: Bulgarian
- Picture format: 16:9

Ownership
- Owner: Radioplay Media

History
- Launched: 1 October 2005 (channel); 2001 (radio)

Links
- Website: www.city.bg

City TV (Bulgarian: Телевизия Сити) is a Bulgarian cable and satellite pay-TV music channel. It was launched in October 2005 as the TV sister channel of Radio City (Bulgaria). Its output includes predominantly current videos by international pop, dance and R&B artists and selected original shows, including The Big 50, Tuborg Rewind, WebHit, Hot Spot, City Hits, City Wake Up, You Are City and others.
