= Radio Nova (Sofia) =

- Bulgaria
- Frequency: Sofia: 101.7 MHz

Programming
- Format: Electronic music

Ownership
- Owner: Communicorp
- Sister stations: Radio 1, Radio 1 Rock, Veronica, BG Radio, NRJ, Radio City

History
- First air date: December 2003

Links
- Website: http://www.radionova.bg/

Radio Nova (101.70 FM) is a Bulgarian radio station broadcasting electronic and dancefloor music only.

== History ==
Radio Nova began broadcasting in December 2003 as a Christmas Radio, and from 1 January 2004 was named Nova. Radio Nova transmits in Sofia on 101.7 MHz, in Varna on 91.2 MHz until 13 May 2006 and in Stara Zagora on 93.6 MHz until July 2004.
