= Let Me Think About It =

2007 single by Ida Corr and Fedde Le Grand

Single by Ida Corr vs. Fedde Le Grand

from the album One
- Released: 5 August 2007
- Recorded: 10 October 2006
- Genre: Electro house
- Length: 6:05 (club mix)
- Label: Lifted House, Ministry of Sound, Flamingo Recordings
- Songwriters: Ida Corr, Burhan Genc, Christian von Staffeldt
- Producers: Ida Corr, MoTrack

Ida Corr singles chronology
"Lonely Girl" (2006)	"Let Me Think About It" (2007)	"Ride My Tempo" (2008)

"Let Me Think About It" is a song performed by Danish soul singer Ida Corr and Dutch house DJ Fedde Le Grand. It is a remix by le Grand of Corr's original track which appears on her 2006 album Robosoul. The song features credited vocals by Corr and uncredited vocals by Danish R&B singer Burhan G.

== Production ==
In 2006, Ida Corr, Christian von Staffeldt a.k.a. Motrack and Burhan Genc wrote the track for Ida Corr's second album Robosoul. Corr, Motrack and Kasper Tranberg produced the original album version of the song.

In 2007 Fedde Le Grand heard the album version through Ida's label Lifted House. He then produced a remix of the song and released it through his label Flamingo Recordings.

The remix has an electro and house feel, with a 'jerky' beat and also with an element of jazz. The original song uses less drums and has an acoustic-urban feel.

== Critical reception ==
Alex Fletcher of Digital Spy gave the song four out of five stars, and wrote: "Fedde has teamed up with Ida Corr to produce another three minutes of thunderous dance-tastic frivolities. 'Let Me Think About It' couldn't possibly be any more of an Ibiza TUNE. It's the sound of Pete Tong, Dave Pearce and Scott Mills stood screaming with a load of Club 18-30 reps, while some boozed-up bikini-clad temptress grinds up against you all soaked up into a CD package. Packed with parping horns, cascading synth beats and the sound of a fire alarm being played along to the theme from Shaft".

== Music video ==
On 1 June 2007 director Marcus Adams shot the music video for the remix in London. The video features Ida Corr with an afro hairdo and the dancers Anchelique Mariano, Dominique Tipper and Stephanie Fitzpatrick, dressed in a similar manner dancing and feigning to play various instruments. Dancer Jason Beitel, who mimes to Burhan G's voice, is the male protagonist of the clip. Natricia Bernard did the choreography.

== Chart performance ==
The song is the third Danish single of Ida Corr's album Robosoul and the third single from Fedde le Grand, released in the United Kingdom, following the number-one hit "Put Your Hands Up 4 Detroit", and the well-received collaboration with Danish singer Camille Jones, "The Creeps". "Let Me Think About It" became the most successful single for both artists. The single reached number two on the UK Singles Chart on 7 October 2007 and stayed there for one more week. In Australia, it peaked at number 14 on the Australian ARIA Singles Chart, and in New Zealand, it reached number 12.

In the United States, it was released by Ida Corr (but listed as "Ida Corr vs. Fedde le Grand") and reached number one on the Billboard Hot Dance Airplay chart on 9 February 2008, making it the first import single to reach the chart, until the week ending 1 March, when Ministry of Sound America picked up the single for a US commercial release. The song also holds the record for the most weeks on the Hot Dance Airplay chart with 52 weeks. In Germany, the single peaked at number 14 on the German Singles Chart. In 2008, it stayed over 40 weeks within the top 100, which resulted in the longest stay for a single in the German top 100 in 2008.

== Track listing ==
Danish single

1. Let Me Think About It (Fedde Le Grand Club Mix) 6:05
2. Let Me Think About It (Fedde Le Grand Radio Edit) 2:35
3. Let Me Think About It (Funkerman Remix)
4. Let Me Think About It (Gregor Salto & DJ Madskilz Remix)
5. Let Me Think About It (MBK Extended Mix)
6. Let Me Think About It (MBK Remix Radio Edit)
7. Let Me Think About It (Sidelmann Remix)
8. Let Me Think About It (Original Album Version) 3:45

Danish remix single

1. Let Me Think About It (Fedde Le Grand Radio Edit) 2:30
2. Let Me Think About It (Fedde Le Grand Club Mix) 5:45
3. Let Me Think About It (MBK Remix Radio Edit)
4. Let Me Think About It (MBK Extended Mix)
5. Let Me Think About It (Micky Slim Remix)
6. Let Me Think About It (Eddie Thoneick Remix)
7. Let Me Think About It (Funkerman Remix)
8. Let Me Think About It (Gregor Salto & DJ Madskilz Remix)
9. Let Me Think About It (James Talk Remix)
10. Let Me Think About It (Jason Herd's Jfunk Remix)
11. Let Me Think About It (Sidelmann Remix)
12. Let Me Think About It (Original Album Version) 3:40

Australian single

1. Let Me Think About It (Fedde Le Grand Radio Edit) 2:35
2. Let Me Think About It (Fedde Le Grand Club Mix) 6:05
3. Let Me Think About It (Instrumental) 2:45
4. Let Me Think About It (Eddie Thoneick Remix)
5. Let Me Think About It (Jason Herd's Jfunk Remix)

German single

1. Let Me Think About It (Fedde Le Grand Radio Edit) 2:30
2. Let Me Think About It (Fedde Le Grand Club Mix) 5:45
3. Let Me Think About It (Gregor Salto & DJ Madskilz Remix)
4. Let Me Think About It (Jason Herd's Jfunk Remix)
5. Let Me Think About It (Eddie Thoneick Remix)
6. Let Me Think About It (Instrumental) 2:45
7. Let Me Think About It (Music Video) 6:05

US digital download

1. Let Me Think About It (Fedde Le Grand Radio Edit) 2:35
2. Let Me Think About It (Robbie Rivera Juicy Miami Mix)
3. Let Me Think About It (Eddie Thoneick Remix)
4. Let Me Think About It (Jason Herd's Jfunk Remix)

US remix digital download

1. Let Me Think About It (Fedde Le Grand Club Mix) 6:05
2. Let Me Think About It (Funkerman Remix)
3. Let Me Think About It (Micky Slim Remix)
4. Let Me Think About It (James Talk Remix)
5. Let Me Think About It (Sidelmann Remix)

UK & US singles

- "Let Me Think About It" (Extended Club Mix) 6:05

== Personnel ==
- Ida Corr – songwriting, production, vocals
- MoTrack (Christian von Staffeldt) – songwriting, production, additional instruments
- Burhan Genc – songwriting, vocals
- Kasper Tranberg – trumpet

== Charts ==
=== Charts ===
Chart (2007–2008)	Peak position
Australia (ARIA)	14
Austria (Ö3 Austria Top 40)	13
Belgium (Ultratip Bubbling Under Wallonia)	12
Belgium (Ultratop 50 Flanders)	21
CIS Airplay (TopHit)	9
Denmark (Tracklisten)	12
Europe (Eurochart Hot 100)	9
France (SNEP)	29
Germany (GfK)	14
Hungary (Dance Top 40)	1
Hungary (Single Top 40)	2
Ireland (IRMA)	8
Italy (FIMI)	36
Netherlands (Single Top 100)	5
New Zealand (Recorded Music NZ)	12
Romania (Romanian Top 100)	2
Russia Airplay (TopHit)	8
Switzerland (Schweizer Hitparade)	23
UK Singles (OCC)	2
UK Dance Chart (Official Charts Company)	1
US Hot Dance Airplay (Billboard)	1
US Pop 100 (Billboard)	97

2025 weekly chart performance for "Let Me Think About It"
Chart (2025)	Peak position
Moldova Airplay (TopHit)	56

=== Monthly charts ===
2025 monthly chart performance for "Let Me Think About It"
Chart (2025)	Position
Moldova Airplay (TopHit)	80

=== Year-end charts ===
2007 year-end chart performance for "Let Me Think About It"
Chart (2007)	Peak position
Australian Club Chart	4
Australian Dance Chart	13
Australian Singles Chart	86
CIS (Tophit)	146
Dutch Singles Chart	22
Russia Airplay (TopHit)	132
UK Singles Chart	41

2008 year-end chart performance for "Let Me Think About It"
Chart (2008)	Peak position
Australian Dance Singles Chart	15
Austrian Singles Chart	49
Brazil (Crowley)	33
CIS (Tophit)	30
European Hot 100 Singles	55
French Airplay Chart	52
French Singles Chart	48
Germany Dance Chart	41
German Singles Chart	27
Hungary (Dance Top 40)	13
New Zealand Airplay Chart	26
Russia Airplay (TopHit)	22
Switzerland Singles Chart	66
U.S. Billboard Hot Dance Airplay	1

=== Decade-end charts ===
Decade-end chart performance for "Let Me Think About It"
Chart (2000–2009)	Position
Russia Airplay (TopHit)	36

== Certifications ==
Region	Certification	Certified units/sales
Denmark (IFPI Danmark)	Platinum	15,000^{^}
Germany (BVMI)	Gold	150,000^{^}
New Zealand (RMNZ)	Gold	7,500^{*}
United Kingdom (BPI)	Gold	400,000^{‡}
^{*} Sales figures based on certification alone.^{^} Shipments figures based on certification alone.^{‡} Sales+streaming figures based on certification alone.

== Awards and nominations ==
"Let Me Think About It" has been certified a Platinum Award for more than 15,000 sold singles by IFPI in Denmark and with an award for more than 10,000 plays in UK by Nielsen Music Control Airplay Awards Notification UK. The single also won two Danish DeeJay Awards in 2008 for "Best Danish Deejay Favorite" and "Best Danish Dancehit". In 2008 the song has been certified an IMPALA Diamond Award for selling more than 250,000 units (CDs, Downloads, Albumtrack) in the European countries.

Award show	Award	Title	Result	
2008	P3 Guld Awards	Listener's Favourite Hit	“Let Me Think About It”	Nominated
	Danish Deejay Awards	Danish Deejay-Favourite	“Let Me Think About It”	Won
		Dancechart.dk Award (Danish Club Hit of the year)	“Let Me Think About It”	Won
	Zulu Awards	Best Danish Hit	“Let Me Think About It”	Nominated
	International Dance Music Awards	Best Breaks/Electro Track	“Let Me Think About It”	Nominated
	IMPALA Diamond Award			Won
