= Funkerman =

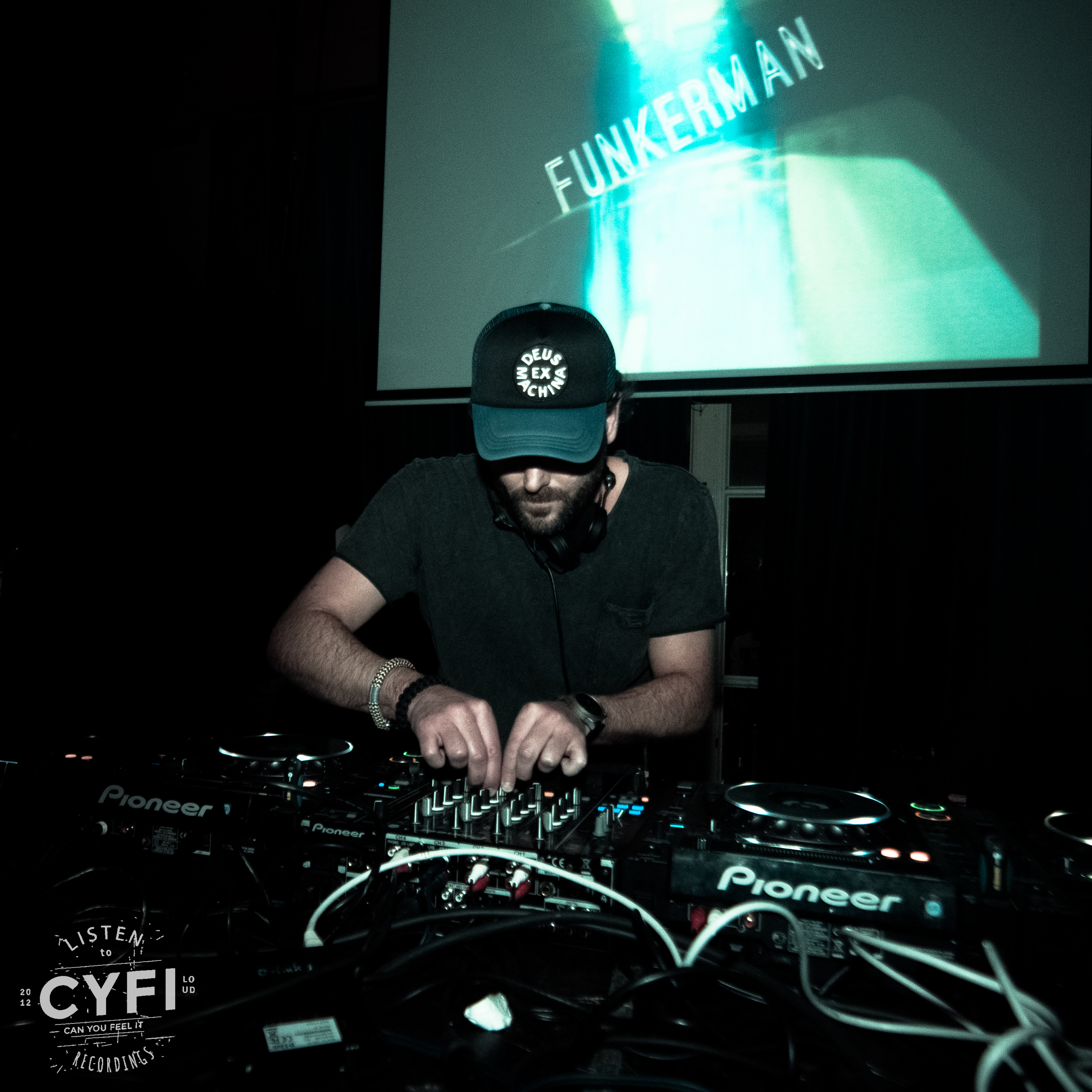

Background information
- Birth name: Ardie van Beek
- Also known as: Funkerman
- Born: 14 June 1975 (age 49); Breda, Netherlands
- Genres: House; deep house; tech house; electronic
- Occupations: DJ; record producer; remixer
- Instruments: DJ mixer; synthesizer; Cubase
- Years active: 1990–present
- Labels: Can You Feel It; Stealth; N.E.W.S.; Defected; Spinnin'; Be Yourself; Ultra
- Website: funkerman.com

Funkerman (born 1975 in Breda, Netherlands) is a Dutch house DJ, record producer and remixer, who runs the record label Flamingo Recordings with Raf Jansen and Fedde Le Grand.

== Biography ==
In 2005, Funkerman topped the Dutch club charts with "Rule the Night" and "The One" and in 2007 he made the Dutch Top 40, the Mega Single Top 100 and the Mega Top 50 thanks to his collaboration with Fedde Le Grand under their "F to the F" alias with "Wheels In Motion". In that same year, he made the international charts with the track "Speed Up", which eventually got him signed by UK-based label Defected Records. In 2008, he delivered several remixes and released "3 Minutes To Explain", again a collaboration with Fedde Le Grand.

The song "Speed Up" is available as a downloadable track on the Xbox 360 karaoke game Lips.

In May 2011, both Funkerman and Raf Jansen signed an exclusive publishing deal with Sony ATV, and they started a new record label called Can You Feel It Records.

In January 2015, his collaboration with Hardwell featuring I-Fan ("Where Is Here Now") was included on Hardwell's debut album United We Are.

== Discography ==
=== Albums ===
- 2010: House for All

=== Singles and EPs ===
- 2002: Dragonson and Funkerman – Freakshow by Art
- 2002: DJ Renegade and Funkerman – Cadillacs and Baseball Bats
- 2002: Fusic – Hitz of the Glitz E.P.
- 2003: DJ Renegade and Funkerman – Cuban Cigars & Bassguitars
- 2003: Ard and Funkerman – Delicious
- 2003: Funkerman – The Supernatural EP
- 2003: Funkertracks – We Live for This
- 2005: Funkerman and RAF – Rule the Night / Bryston Love
- 2005: Funkerman – The One
- 2006: Funkerman feat. JW – Fallin' in Love
- 2006: Funkerman – Speed Up — UK #85 (charted 2008)
- 2007: Funkerman and Fedde Le Grand present "F To The F" – Wheels in Motion
- 2007: Fedde le Grand and Funkerman feat. Shermanology – 3 Minutes to Explain
- 2008: Baggi Begovic and Funkerman – Good God
- 2008: Funkerman feat. JW – One for Me
- 2008: F-man – Batsen
- 2009: Funkerman feat. I-Fan – Remember
- 2009: Fedde le Grand and F-man – The Joker
- 2009: Funkerman feat. Mitch Crown – Slide
- 2009: Funkerman feat. Shermanology – Automatic
- 2010: Funkerman feat. Ida Corr – Unconditional Love
- 2010: Danny P Jazz, Fedde Le Grand and Funkerman – New Life
- 2010: Funkerman – Brooklyn Bounce EP
- 2010: Funkerman ft. Left – Speed Up Once More
- 2011: Funkerman – Paperbag Revolution / Everyday
- 2011: Funkerman – La Sirena EP
- 2011: Funkerman – Crash Test
- 2011: Funkerman – Pressure Cooker
- 2011: Funkerman – Musique Non Stop
- 2012: Funkerman – Blow
- 2012: Funkerman – The Light
- 2013: Funkerman – Paradise / Dashboardlight
- 2013: Funkerman – Push 'Em Up
- 2013: Funkerman – Pondifonk
- 2013: Marco Lys ft. F-man – Ya Mamma
- 2013: Funkerman – Wine & Roll
- 2014: Funkerman ft. Jay Colin – Tune!
- 2014: Funkerman – Coming Home
- 2015: Hardwell and Funkerman ft. I-Fan – Where Is Here Now
- 2015: Funkerman ft. J.W. – The Masterplan
- 2015: Funkerman ft. J.W. – Foolish Game
- 2016: Funkerman – You Got Me Weak
- 2019: Funkerman and Pete Surreal – What's That
- 2020: Shermanology and Funkerman – Amen

=== Remixes ===
- 2003: Kruel Kutz – Blame It on the Funk
- 2003: DJ Jani – Beyond Reach (Fusic RMX)
- 2005: Red Drop – Music 4 Me
- 2006: Conrado Martinez and Frank Rempe – Capicu
- 2006: Camille Jones – The Creeps
- 2007: Jesse Garcia – Off the Hook
- 2007: Ricky L feat. M:ck – Born Again
- 2007: Ida Corr – Let Me Think About It
- 2007: Yoav – Club Thing
- 2007: Eddie Thoneick Pres. Female Deejays – If Only
- 2007: Ron Carroll – The Nike Song
- 2008: Todd Terry All Stars – Get Down
- 2008: Onionz feat. S.N.O.W. – Nothin But Love
- 2008: Kaskade – Angel on My Shoulder
- 2008: Jaimy and Kenny D. – Keep on Touchin' Me
- 2008: Sugababes – Girls
- 2009: Re-United – Sun Is Shining
- 2009: Chocolate Puma feat. Shermanology – Only Love Can Save Me
- 2009: Ida Corr – I Want You
- 2009: Fedde le Grand feat. Mitch Crown – Let Me Be Real
- 2009: Red Hot Chili Peppers – Otherside
- 2009: Rune RK and Clara Sofie – Cry Out
- 2009: DJ Sammy and The Majorkings – 4Love
- 2009: Shermanology – The Weather
- 2010: Guru Josh Project – Crying in the Rain
- 2010: Technotronic – Pump Up the Jam
- 2010: Robbie Rivera – We Live for the Music
- 2010: Sharam Jey feat. Tommie Sunshine – The Things
- 2010: Marco V ft. Khashassi – Predator
- 2010: Mastiksoul – Run For Cover
- 2011: Manufactured Superstars – Angry Circus
- 2011: Moby – The Day
- 2012: Re-United – Sun Is Shining 2012
- 2013: DJ Licious & Sir-G ft. Abdou – Hide Your Love
- 2013: Laid Back – White Horse
- 2013: Dennis van de Geest – Bring The Noise
- 2013: Razzy Bailey – I Still Hate Hate
- 2014: Goose Bumps & Jason Caesar – This Life
- 2014: DJ Licious – People
- 2014: Keljet – Run This World
- 2014: Lenny Fontana – I Don't Want You Back
- 2014: Fedde le Grand & Funkerman – 3 Minutes to Explain (Fame remix)
