= The Creeps (song) =

2005 single by Camille Jones

Single by Camille Jones

from the album Surrender
- Released: 2005
- Label: Tommy Boy Music (US)
- Songwriter: Camille Jones
- Producers: Camille Jones; Per Ebdrup (co-producer)

"The Creeps"
- UK CD maxi-single cover

Single by Camille Jones vs. Fedde Le Grand
- Released: 5 March 2007
- Recorded: 2007
- Genre: Dance; house
- Length: 2:30 (radio edit); 7:22 (club mix)
- Songwriter: Camille Jones
- Producers: Camille Jones; Gauzz (Per Ebdrup); Fedde le Grand (additional)

"The Creeps" is a song written, performed and produced (with Per Ebdrup) by Danish singer Camille Jones, released in 2005 and remixed in 2007 by Fedde Le Grand. The song (which samples Jeff Wayne's War of the Worlds) was the first single of Camille's 2004 album Surrender. Dutch DJ-producer Fedde Le Grand signed the song to his own burgeoning Flamingo Recordings imprint and produced a house remix. In early 2007, the remix had been picked up by radio stations in the UK and all over Europe before it was released on Ministry of Sound on 5 March 2007 in the UK and Ireland. The remix became a hit on the charts and the clubs as well. In the UK, "The Creeps" reached number 7 on the Singles Chart and number one on the Dance Chart. On 25 July 2008, "The Creeps" was released as a physical and download single in Germany through Kontor Records Hamburg. The remix from 2007 was remastered slightly, with new instruments on the chorus, which resemble the trumpets on Fedde Le Grand's remix of "Let Me Think About It" by Ida Corr.

== Music video ==
Secretaries dancing in the clip.

There are four official music videos to the song The Creeps. The first video (for the 2005 single) was produced by Mikkel Serup and received a nomination for a Danish Music Award in 2005. In 2006 the same video was released on the Spanish distributor Blanco y Negro, but with the Original Club version as background music. The second music video was directed by Marcus Adams and was recorded in an office with dancers/models performing as secretaries, among them Lauren Ridealgh, Stephanie Fitzpatrick and Emma Warton, with choreography by Paul Roberts. The video was inspired by the music video to "Express Yourself" and the movie Secretary. In July 2008, a new edited version of the second video had been released to German Channels, which contained also a new 2008 version of the remix.

== Charts ==
The 2007 remix by Fedde Le Grand peaked at number 7 on the UK singles chart.

=== Weekly charts ===
Chart (2007)	Peak position
Australia (ARIA)	15
Belgium (Ultratop 50 Flanders)	14
Belgium (Ultratop 50 Wallonia)	30
CIS Airplay (TopHit)	46
Denmark (Tracklisten)	12
European Hot 100 Singles (Billboard)	23
Finland (Suomen virallinen lista)	12
Germany (GfK)	82
Hungary (Dance Top 40)	3
Hungary (Single Top 40)	7
Ireland (IRMA)	20
Netherlands (Dutch Top 40)	18
Netherlands (Single Top 100)	22
UK Singles (Official Charts)	7
UK Dance (Official Charts)	1
US Dance Club Songs (Billboard)	13

=== Year-end charts ===
Chart (2007)	Position
Australia (ARIA)	57
Belgium (Ultratop Flanders)	77
CIS (Tophit)	195
Hungary (Dance Top 40)	8
UK Singles (Official Charts Company)	68

On 25 July 2008, the single was released as a physical CD, which reached #82 in the Main German Single Charts Top 100 (as of 8 August 2008).

== The Creeps (2019 remixes) ==
In 2019 Spinnin' Records launched a package containing remixes by Bingo Players, Nonsens and JS16.
