= Under the Sun (Ida Corr album) =

Studio album by Ida Corr
- Released: 31 August 2009
- Recorded: 2008–2009
- Genre: Pop, R&B, soul
- Length: 38:01
- Label: Lifted House, disco:wax, Warner
- Producer: Ida Corr (exec.), Christian von Staffeldt

Ida Corr chronology
One (2008)	Under the Sun (2009)

Singles from Under the Sun
- 1. "Time" Released: 27 April 2009; 2. "I Want You" Released: 21 October 2009; 3. "Under the Sun" Released: 15 June 2010; 4. "In the Name of Love" Released: 11 October 2010; 5. "What Goes Around Comes Around" Released: 18 March 2011

Professional ratings
Review scores
Source	Rating
dr.dk/Musik	4/6 stars
Ekstra Bladet	2/6 stars
GAFFA	5/6 stars
Jyllands-Posten	5/6 stars
Soundvenue	2/6 stars
TJECK Magazine	4/6 stars

Under the Sun is the third studio album by Danish singer Ida Corr, released on 31 August 2009. On 27 April the first single "Time" was released in Denmark, Sweden, Finland and Norway. The album's second single, "I Want You" was released in Scandinavia on 10 August and in the German-speaking countries and Italy shortly after. The album was published under the label disco:wax under license from Lifted House, and distributed by Warner Music. The album's third single "Under the Sun", which features guest vocals by Shaggy, was released digitally worldwide in December. In March 2011 the album was released in the German-speaking countries.

== Track listing ==
All songs are written by Ida Corr except where stated.

No.	Title	Writer(s)	Length
1.	"Bring the Beat Back"		2:49
2.	"Time"		1:54
3.	"Under the Sun" (featuring Shaggy)	Ida Corr, O. Burrel	4:02
4.	"Ladidadi" (featuring Kuku Agami)	Ida Corr, Kuku Agami	2:46
5.	"I Want You"		2:49
6.	"I Don't Wanna"		3:54
7.	"In the Name of Love"		4:07
8.	"Fruitstore"		2:54
9.	"Raindrops"		3:46
10.	"I Do"		2:49
11.	"Take It Back"		2:45
12.	"Relatively"		4:16

Scandinavia iTunes bonus tracks
No.	Title	Length
13.	"Time" (Beatchuggers & Sidelmann Remix)	6:06
14.	"I Want You" (Jason Gault Remix)	5:03

German digital bonus tracks
No.	Title	Length
13.	"What Goes Around Comes Around" (radio version)	2:57
14.	"Time" (music video)	2:00

== Personnel ==
- Ida Corr – executive producer, backing vocals, instruments
- Christian von Staffeldt – producer, backing vocals, instruments
- Tracks 1, 3, 4, 7, 8, 11, 12: Lars Hartvig – saxophone, flute
- Saqib Hassan – mixing
- MusicMaster – mastering

== Release history ==
Region	Date	Format	Label
Denmark	31 August 2009	Digital download, CD	Warner Music Denmark
Sweden	31 August 2009	Digital download, CD	Warner Music Denmark
Norway	31 August 2009	Digital download, CD	Warner Music Denmark
Finland	31 August 2009	Digital download, CD	Warner Music Denmark
Germany	17 March 2011	Digital download	Embassy of Music
Austria	17 March 2011	Digital download	Embassy of Music
Switzerland	17 March 2011	Digital download	Embassy of Music
Germany	15 April 2011	CD	Embassy of Music
Austria	15 April 2011	CD	Embassy of Music
Switzerland	15 April 2011	CD	Embassy of Music
