= SugaRush Beat Company =

- Origin: London, England; Los Angeles, California, United States; Melbourne, Australia; Copenhagen, Denmark
- Genres: Pop, R&B, soul, electronica, alternative dance
- Years active: 2005–2009
- Labels: RCA Label Group UK
- Members: Rahsaan Patterson; Ida Corr
- Website: http://www.sugarushbeatco.com

SugaRush Beat Company is a musical group consisting of singers Rahsaan Patterson and Ida Corr.

The band formed in 2005, when Patterson was touring in Australia to promote his third album After Hours. While staying in Melbourne he met Rogers, when he booked his studio. Following their first sessions they then spent the next couple of months jetting back and forth between Los Angeles and Australia, writing songs together, until the addition of Danish soul singer Ida Corr.

In November 2007, they released their first record, SugaRush Beat Company EP through the UK label RCA. In February 2008 they appeared on Later with Jools Holland, where they performed their songs "L-O-V-E" and "They Said I Said". A release of the single "Gunshots 'n Candyfloss" followed soon after in March 2008. In June 2008 they released "L-O-V-E" as a single along with their first musicvideo produced by Planet of Animation from Melbourne. Their debut album was released in the UK in September 2008 with "They Said I Said" as the lead single (with a musicvideo as well and with Corr on the lead vocals). In January 2009 SugaRush Beat Company released their single "Love Breed" with Corr on the lead vocals again.

== Discography ==
=== Albums ===
- SugaRush Beat Company (2008)

=== EPs ===
- SugaRush Beat Company EP (2007)

=== Singles ===
Year	Title	Album
2008	"Gunshots 'n Candyfloss"	SugaRush Beat Company
2008	"L-O-V-E"	SugaRush Beat Company
2008	"They Said I Said"	SugaRush Beat Company
2009	"Love Breed"	SugaRush Beat Company
