= City Radio (Bulgaria) =

- Bulgaria
- Frequency: See list

Programming
- Language: Bulgarian
- Format: Contemporary hit radio

Ownership
- Owner: Radioplay Media
- Sister stations: Radio 1, Radio 1 Rock, Veronika, BG Radio, NRJ, Radio Nova, Nova News

Technical information
- Transmitter coordinates: 42°40′36″N 23°20′30″E

Links
- Webcast: Listen live
- Website: city.bg

Radio City (also known as City Radio) is a commercial radio station in Bulgaria aimed at young people. The format of Radio City is CHR, playing the biggest current hits from popular music genres (Pop, R&B, Dance, etc.).

== History ==
Radio City was founded in 1998 as an association between Kamen Spasov and Jonas Siljemark. Radio City began broadcasting in February 2001, first in the capital Sofia at 99.7 MHz and later in Plovdiv, Varna, Stara Zagora, Blagoevgrad and Kyustendil. In 2007, Radio City won a license for Lovech. Radio City broadcast in Veliko Tarnovo and Ruse from August 19, 2008 until May 24 and September 3, 2010, respectively.

Radio City is also transmitted via cable and satellite operators in Bulgaria. In 2005, the media created and began broadcasting a music television channel called City TV.

== Frequencies ==
- Sofia - 99.70 MHz
- Plovdiv - 91.1 MHz
- Varna - 98.6 MHz
- Stara Zagora - 96.8 MHz
- Blagoevgrad - 95.0 MHz
- Kyustendil - 88.5 MHz
- Lovech - 87.6 MHz
- Pazardzhik - 96.4 MHz
- Balchik-Kaliakra 89.0 MHz

=== Via satellite ===
Satellite: Intelsat 12 Position: 45 East, Frequency: 11.632 GHz, Polarization: Vertical, Symbol rate: 20.000 Mbit/s, FEC: 3/4 SID:11, APID:62
