= Put Your Hands Up 4 Detroit =

2006 single by Fedde le Grand aka Sam

- Dutch and Belgian cover

Single by Fedde Le Grand
- Released: 26 June 2006
- Genre: House
- Length: 6:32 (original version); 2:43 (radio edit)
- Label: Spinnin'
- Songwriter: Fedde Le Grand
- Producer: Fedde Le Grand

Fedde Le Grand singles chronology
"I Miss You" (2005)	"Put Your Hands Up 4 Detroit" (2006)	"Just Trippin'" (2006)

Alternative cover
- UK CD2 cover

"Put Your Hands Up 4 Detroit" (formatted as "Put Your Hands Up for Detroit" outside Benelux) is a song written and produced by Dutch electronic producer and DJ Fedde Le Grand. It samples Matthew Dear and Disco D's "Hands Up for Detroit".

== History ==
The song was released in the Netherlands by Flamingo Recordings first on 26 June 2006, peaking at number four on the Dutch Top 40 and number five on the Single Top 100. It was released in the rest of Europe (UK excluded) in August 2006 and enjoyed steadily increasing popularity.

In the United Kingdom, the single originally reached number one on the UK Dance Chart and number 53 on the UK Singles Chart before being released on CD, from 12-inch vinyl and digital download sales alone. It was given a full release in Britain on 23 October 2006 and leapt to number two on the chart, selling 46,000 copies. The following week, the song climbed to number one. It remained at number one for one week before being knocked out by "The Rose" by Westlife. The single went on to be the UK's 20th best-selling single of the year.

Outside Benelux, the song was released as "Put Your Hands Up for Detroit", with "4" replaced with "for". The song was also remixed in the UK, Germany and Spain and included verses from rappers Bizarre and King Gordy.

== Lyrics ==
After some confusion regarding the correct lyrics to the song, Fedde Le Grand confirmed on his official website the sampled lyrics are, "put your hands up for Detroit, our lovely city", as opposed to "I love this city". The same lyrics and audio recording are sampled from Matthew Dear and Disco D's 1999 release "Hands Up for Detroit".

== Music video ==
The video is available in two versions, a regular cut and late-night one with extended footage, and is directed by Marcus Adams and produced by Lara Schachat. It is set in Detroit, Michigan, in 2027 and features a Kubrick-type of science lab where gynoid technicians create multiple androids.

For every android they create, they test its reaction to the gynoids stripping; the first android has a meltdown; the second flirts with a male doctor (a cameo of Fedde le Grand) instead of looking at the girls; the third time it works, but he discovers that he is a robot instead of human so he escapes, causing a system shutdown protocol to be activated, shutting down the gynoids. After this the runaway android is shut down by remote terminate.

The video was filmed in the vacant offices of what used to be the headquarters of the Safeway supermarket chain at Hayes, Hillingdon. The building in which the android is built was the mainframe operations room, refurbished by the supermarket before its demise, at an estimated £5M. The alphanumeric grid layout of the room, used to record cable and pipework, can be seen as the android is built. The rest of the video is shot in the building, known as Safeway 2, formerly holding IT functions. It is now used by Rackspace hosting.

== Track listings ==
Dutch and Belgian CD single

1. "Put Your Hands Up 4 Detroit" (radio edit)
2. "Put Your Hands Up 4 Detroit" (extended mix)
3. "Put Your Hands Up 4 Detroit" (dub mix)

German, Austrian, and Swiss CD single

1. "Put Your Hands Up for Detroit" (radio edit) – 2:22
2. "Put Your Hands Up for Detroit" (featuring King Gordy and Bizarre of D12) – 3:05
3. "Put Your Hands Up for Detroit" (club mix) – 6:37
4. "Put Your Hands Up for Detroit" (DJ Delicious & Till West remix) – 6:23
5. "Put Your Hands Up for Detroit" (TV Rock and Dirty South Melbourne Militia remix) – 6:50

UK 12-inch single

A1. "Put Your Hands Up for Detroit" (club mix)
A2. "Put Your Hands Up for Detroit" (DJ Delicious & Till West remix)
B1. "Put Your Hands Up for Detroit" (TV Rock and Dirty South Melbourne Militia remix)
B2. "Put Your Hands Up for Detroit" (Claude Von Stroke Packard Plant remix)
B3. "Put Your Hands Up for Detroit" (acapella)

UK CD1

1. "Put Your Hands Up for Detroit" (radio edit)
2. "Put Your Hands Up for Detroit" (club mix)
3. "Put Your Hands Up for Detroit" (TV Rock and Dirty South Melbourne Militia remix)
4. "Put Your Hands Up for Detroit" (DJ Delicious & Till West remix)
5. "Put Your Hands Up for Detroit" (Soul Central Loves Detroit remix)
6. "Put Your Hands Up ... ???"
7. "Put Your Hands Up for Detroit" (video—daytime version)
8. "Put Your Hands Up for Detroit" (video—late night version)

UK CD2

1. "Put Your Hands Up for Detroit" (radio edit)
2. "Put Your Hands Up for Detroit" (featuring King Gordy and Bizarre of D12)

Australian CD single

1. "Put Your Hands Up for Detroit" (radio edit)
2. "Put Your Hands Up for Detroit" (club mix)
3. "Put Your Hands Up for Detroit" (TV Rock and Dirty South Melbourne Militia remix)
4. "Put Your Hands Up for Detroit" (DJ Delicious & Till West remix)
5. "Put Your Hands Up for Detroit" (Claude VonStroke Packard Plant remix)

== Charts ==
=== Weekly charts ===
Chart (2006–2007)	Peak position
Australia (ARIA)	8
Australian Club Chart (ARIA)	1
Australian Dance (ARIA)	2
Austria (Ö3 Austria Top 40)	56
Belgium (Ultratop 50 Flanders)	14
Belgium (Ultratip Bubbling Under Wallonia)	1
Denmark (Tracklisten)	5
Europe (Eurochart Hot 100)	4
Finland (Suomen virallinen lista)	1
France (SNEP)	34
Germany (GfK)	78
Hungary (Dance Top 40)	1
Hungary (Single Top 40)	1
Ireland (IRMA)	3
Ireland Dance (IRMA)	1
Netherlands (Dutch Top 40)	4
Netherlands (Single Top 100)	5
Romania (Romanian Top 100)	8
Scottish Singles Sales (Official Charts)	1
Sweden (Sverigetopplistan)	44
Switzerland (Schweizer Hitparade)	61
UK Singles (Official Charts)	1
UK Dance (Official Charts)	1
US Dance Singles Sales (Billboard)	24
US Dance Airplay (Billboard)	11

=== Year-end charts ===
Chart (2006)	Position
Australian Club Chart (ARIA)	1
Australian Dance (ARIA)	23
Belgium (Ultratop 50 Flanders)	77
Europe (Eurochart Hot 100)	93
Netherlands (Dutch Top 40)	18
Netherlands (Single Top 100)	13
UK Singles (OCC)	20

Chart (2007)	Position
Australia (ARIA)	32
Australian Dance (ARIA)	9
Europe (Eurochart Hot 100)	99

== Certifications ==
Region	Certification	Certified units/sales
United Kingdom (BPI)	Platinum	600,000^{‡}
^{‡} Sales+streaming figures based on certification alone.

== Release history ==
Region	Date	Ref.
Netherlands	26 June 2006	
Europe	August 2006	
United Kingdom	23 October 2006	
Australia	30 October 2006	

== In popular culture ==
- "Put Your Hands Up 4 Detroit" was covered by "Fredde på Grand" as "Håll upp händerna för Stureplan", an "anthem" for Sweden's hottest party sites.
- The song was featured on Series 2 Episode 3 of the British television drama series Hotel Babylon. The episode was broadcast on BBC One in the United Kingdom in March 2007.
- The song was used in the nightclub scene during episode 5 of the BBC sitcom Thieves Like Us.
- Madonna used a sample of the track in a remix version of her 2000 single "Music" as part of her Sticky & Sweet Tour.
- The Detroit Red Wings play the song prior to the start of the first period.
- Beginning with the 2010 season, the Detroit Tigers play the song at Comerica Park after they win at home.
- The St. Louis Cardinals play a remixed version (changing the song's lyric to "Put your hands up for St Louis, our lovely city") when the team takes the field.
- behind the scenes clip at Ministry of Sound
