= Camille Jones =

Danish singer (born 1973)

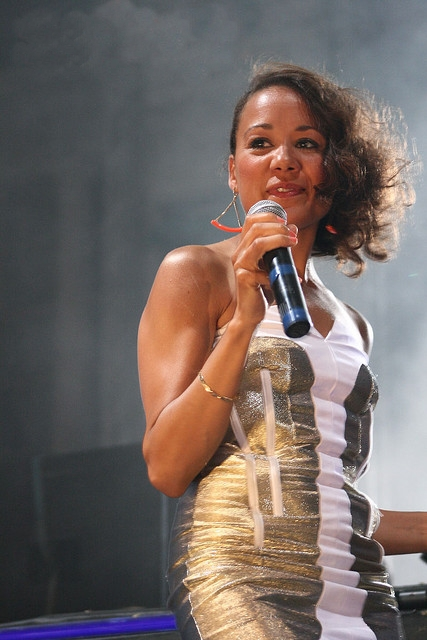
- Camille Jones in 2008

Background information
- Born: 25 June 1973 (age 53); Skanderborg, Denmark
- Origin: Århus, Denmark
- Genres: Pop, dance, house
- Occupation: Singer
- Years active: 2000–present
- Labels: Lifted House, Warner Music Denmark, Tommy Boy Records, Ministry of Sound

Camille Jones (born 25 June 1973) is a Danish pop singer. She is known for her song "The Creeps", written by herself and remixed by Dutch DJ Fedde Le Grand, which became a worldwide club hit in the dance scene in 2007.

== Career ==
Camille Jones was born in Skanderborg, grew up in Aarhus, and spent a year as a YFU exchange student in the United States. In 2000 she enjoyed success within the Danish and European music scenes with the release of her début album Camille Jones, which featured the singles Daddy Would Say and Nothing Comes From Nothing.

In 2004 she released her album Surrender, which featured the single The Creeps. The first video – produced by Mikkel Serup – was nominated for a Danish Music Award in 2005. Dutch DJ-producer Fedde le Grand signed the song to his own burgeoning Flamingo Recordings imprint and completed a House remix. In early 2007 the remix had been picked up by radiostations in the UK and all over Europe before it was released on Ministry of Sound in March 2007. Marcus Adams directed a new video for the single. The song had become a hit on the charts and the clubs as well. In the UK The Creeps reached No. 7 on the Single Charts and No. 1 on the Dance Charts.

Camille's third album Barking Up The Wrong Tree was released in Scandinavia in 2008 and featured the dance singles Difficult Guys, I Am (What You Want Me To Be) and Get Me Out. Videos for Difficult Guys and I Am (What You Want Me To Be) were produced to promote the record.

In January 2011 Jones collaborated with Kato, Ida Corr and Johnson on the Danish-language dance single Sjus. The song debuted at number 1 on the Danish Single charts.

== Discography ==
=== Albums ===
- 2000 – Camille Jones – Offbeat Records
- 2004 – Surrender – Offbeat Records
- 2005 – Surrender (International Version) – Alarm Music
- 2008 – Barking Up the Wrong Tree – Kick Music/Discowax
- 2011 – Did I Say I Love You – LiftedHouse
- 2016 – Camille – disco:wax

=== Singles ===
- 2000 – Nothing Comes from Nothing
- 2000 – Should Have Known Better
- 2000 – Don't Wanna Be
- 2000 – Daddy Would Say
- 2005 – The Creeps
- 2006 – En Verden Perfekt
- 2007 – The Creeps (remixed by Fedde le Grand)
- 2008 – Difficult Guys
- 2008 – I Am (What You Want Me To Be)
- 2008 – Someday (Gauzz Mix)
- 2009 – Get Me Out (Jason Gault Remix)
- 2010 – The Truth
- 2011 – The Streets
- 2011 – Better Forget (feat. The House Keepers)
- 2012 – All I Want (feat. Phunkjump)
- 2012 – Tro, Håb og Kærlighed (Released in Denmark, Norway and Iceland)
- 2012 – Midnat I Mit Liv (Released in Scandinavia)
- 2013 – Waiting
- 2015 – All That Matters

=== Singles as featured artist ===
- 2009 – I Like It (Morten Breum feat. Camille Jones)
- 2011 – Sjus (Kato feat. Ida Corr and Johnson)
- 2012 – All I Want (Phunkjump with Camille Jones)
- 2013 – Miss You (Alexander Brown feat. Camille Jones)
- 2013 – Good Enough (Ludovika feat. Camille Jones)
- 2013 – Feel Much Better (Epik feat. Camille Jones)
- 2014 – Battlefield (Svenstrup & Vendelboe feat. Camille Jones)
