= Ida Corr =

Gambian-Danish singer and songwriter (born 1977)

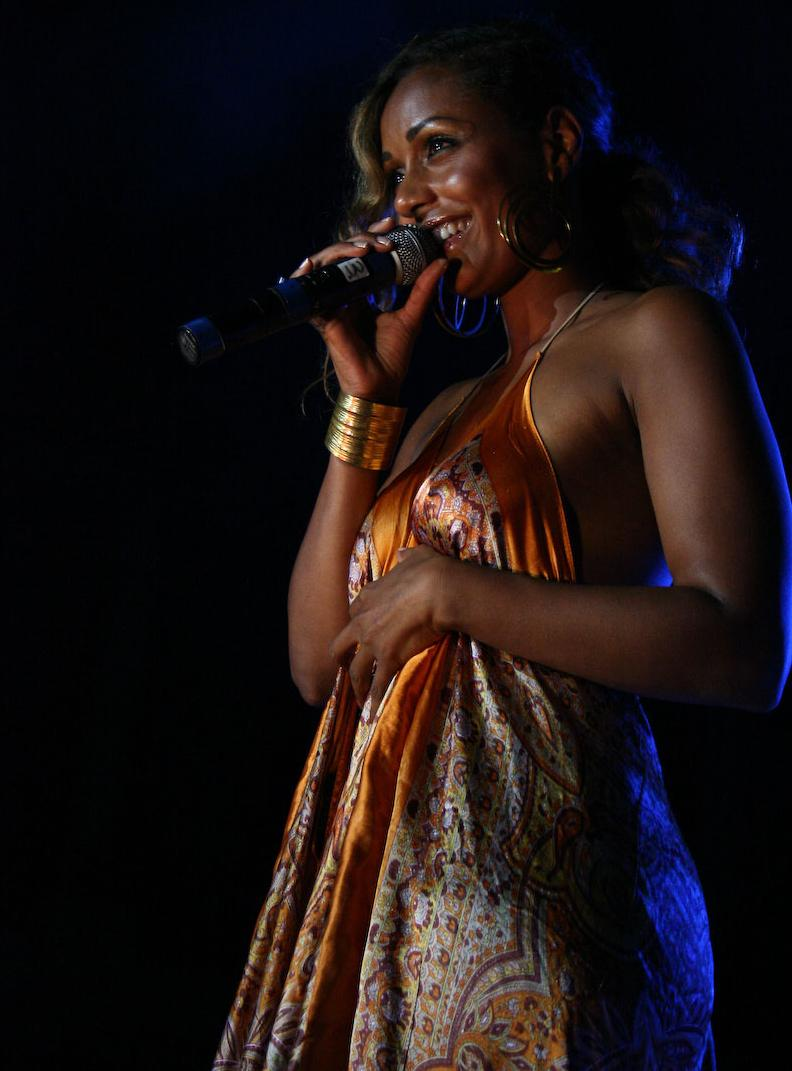
- Corr in 2008

Background information
- Born: 14 March 1977 (age 49); Aarhus, Denmark
- Genres: Pop; dance-pop; synth-pop; house; soul; R&B
- Occupations: Singer-songwriter, musician
- Instrument: Vocals
- Years active: 1991 – present
- Labels: Warner Music, Lifted House, Kick Music

Ida Corr (born 14 March 1977) is a Danish singer, songwriter and music producer of Gambian descent.

== Early life ==
Ida Corr was born on 14 March 1977 to a Danish mother and a Gambian father in Aarhus, Denmark. Her father was a musician. She started drumming at the age of six, and by her ninth birthday she had formed a band, performing soul classics by James Brown and Aretha Franklin on the streets of her city.

== Career ==
At the age of 14 Corr won the first Danish Children Songcontest (Børne Melodi Grand Prix "MGP"). As a young adult she started singing background on tours and in the studio for Danish artists such as Gnags, Sanne Salomonsen, Thomas Helmig and Rasmus Nøhr.

In 2002 Corr became known to the Danish public as a member of the short-lived girlgroup Sha Li Mar, consisting of Christina Undhjem, Engelina and Corr herself. The group regularly performed on the prime time television show Venner for livet (literally "Friends for life"). They released a self-titled album in the same year. In 2004 Corr collaborated with house producer Morten Trust on "I Put My Faith in You", a moderately popular dance hit.

Corr rose to fame in her native Denmark in 2005 with the release of her debut album Streetdiva and in 2006 with her follow-up album Robosoul. After creating a special song with Dutch DJ Fedde le Grand as part of the Live Earth set of international music concerts, her popularity began to spread outside of her homeland. The song, entitled "Mirror 07-07-07", was played at exactly seven minutes past the seventh hour of the seventh day of the seventh month of 2007.

In 2007 Corr received exposure in the Netherlands due to her second collaboration with Fedde le Grand, and her most recent self-written single, remixed by Fedde le Grand, "Let Me Think About It", spread to wider Europe quickly. It is the best-selling single outside Denmark from a Danish singer since the Danish bands Aqua and Infernal.

In 2008 Corr released the compilation album One in Scandinavia. The single "Let Me Think About It" continued its success and reached number 1 on the Billboard Hot Dance Airplay. Though the single peaked only at number 14 on the German Single Charts, it stayed for 40 weeks there in 2008, which resulted in being the track staying the longest in the German Top 100 in 2008. One was released in the United States on 26 August 2008 as the first release on the newly founded label Ministry of Sound America. A release in Russia and Germany followed quickly afterwards.

Corr was also member of the band called SugaRush Beat Company that performed on Later... with Jools Holland in 2008, with a debut album being released in September 2008. Other members of the London-based group were Australian-born producer/multi-instrumentalist/songwriter Jarrad 'Jaz' Rogers and US soul singer-songwriter Rahsaan Patterson.

In January 2009 Corr received an award for the best selling Danish artist selling music in Europe at the European Border Breakers Awards in Groningen. In April 2009 Corr released a music video to "Ride My Tempo" simultaneously to a single release in Germany. A month later a new single for Scandinavia, called "Time", premiered on Danish radio, taken from her fourth album, Under The Sun. The leading single from the album became "I Want You". A musicvideo, however, was only shot for the "Jason Gault Mix". In December the title song, "Under The Sun", which features guest vocals by Jamaican singer Shaggy, was released as a single.

On 16 December 2009, Corr participated at one of the Climate Change concerts in Copenhagen. Alongside Simon Mathew she performed their duet "Illusion", which was written for the World Wide Fund for Nature Climate campaign.

In January 2011 Corr collaborated with Kato, Camille Jones and Johnson on the Danish-language dance single "Sjus". The song debuted at number 1 on the Danish Single charts. Corr was fascinated by the experience of singing in her native language, so she decided to release another Danish single. The result was her first Danish-language solo single, "Musen Efter Katten". At the same time Corr released the worldwide English-language single "What Goes Around Comes Around", with an accompanying musicvideo.

In spring 2012 a new collaboration between British DJ-duo Bimbo Jones and Corr was published worldwide. "See You Later" was originally an instrumental track called "Questions". Another single called "Naughty Girl" was released, both in a Danish and English version. On 20 August 2012, it was announced that Corr would replace Pernille Rosendahl as a judge for the sixth season of the Danish version of X Factor alongside Thomas Blachman and fellow new judge Anne Linnet. In November 2012 "Tonight I'm Your DJ", featuring Fatman Scoop, was released as a worldwide single, an English version of "Musen Efter Katten". The single was taken off the compilation album Singled Out. For unknown reasons, Corr did not return for the seventh season and was replaced by Lina Rafn.

== Discography ==
- Streetdiva (2005)
- Robosoul (2006)
- Under the Sun (2009)
- Corr Values (2013)

== Awards and nominations ==
	Award Show	Award	Title	Result
2006	Danish Music Awards	Best Danish Urban Release	Street Diva	Nominated
2008	Danish Deejay Awards	Danish Artist of the Year	Herself	Nominated
2008	Danish Deejay Awards	Danish Deejay-Favourite	"Let Me Think About It”	Won
2008	Danish Deejay Awards	Dancechart.dk Award	"Let Me Think About It”	Won
2008	P3 Guld Awards	Listener's Favourite Hit	"Let Me Think About It”	Nominated
2008	Zulu Awards	Best Danish Hit	"Let Me Think About It”	Nominated
2008	Zulu Awards	Best Danish Female singer	Herself	Nominated
2008	International Dance Music Awards	Best Breaks/Electro Track	"Let Me Think About It”	Nominated
2009	European Border Breakers Awards	Best Selling Danish Artist in Europe	Herself	Won
2009	African Achievement Awards	Best African Artist	Herself	Won
2012	Danish Deejay Awards	The Voice Clubbing-Award	"Sjus" (with Kato, Camille Jones & Johnson)	Won
2012	Danish Deejay Awards	DK-Award	"Sjus" (with Kato, Camille Jones & Johnson)	Won
2012	Danish Deejay Awards	Dancechart.dk Award	"Sjus" (with Kato, Camille Jones & Johnson)	Won
2012	Danish Deejay Awards	Danish Deejay-Favourite	"Sjus" (with Kato, Camille Jones & Johnson)	Nominated
2014	Scandipop Awards	Best Female Album	Corr Values	Nominated
