= Fedde Le Grand =

Dutch DJ (born 1977)

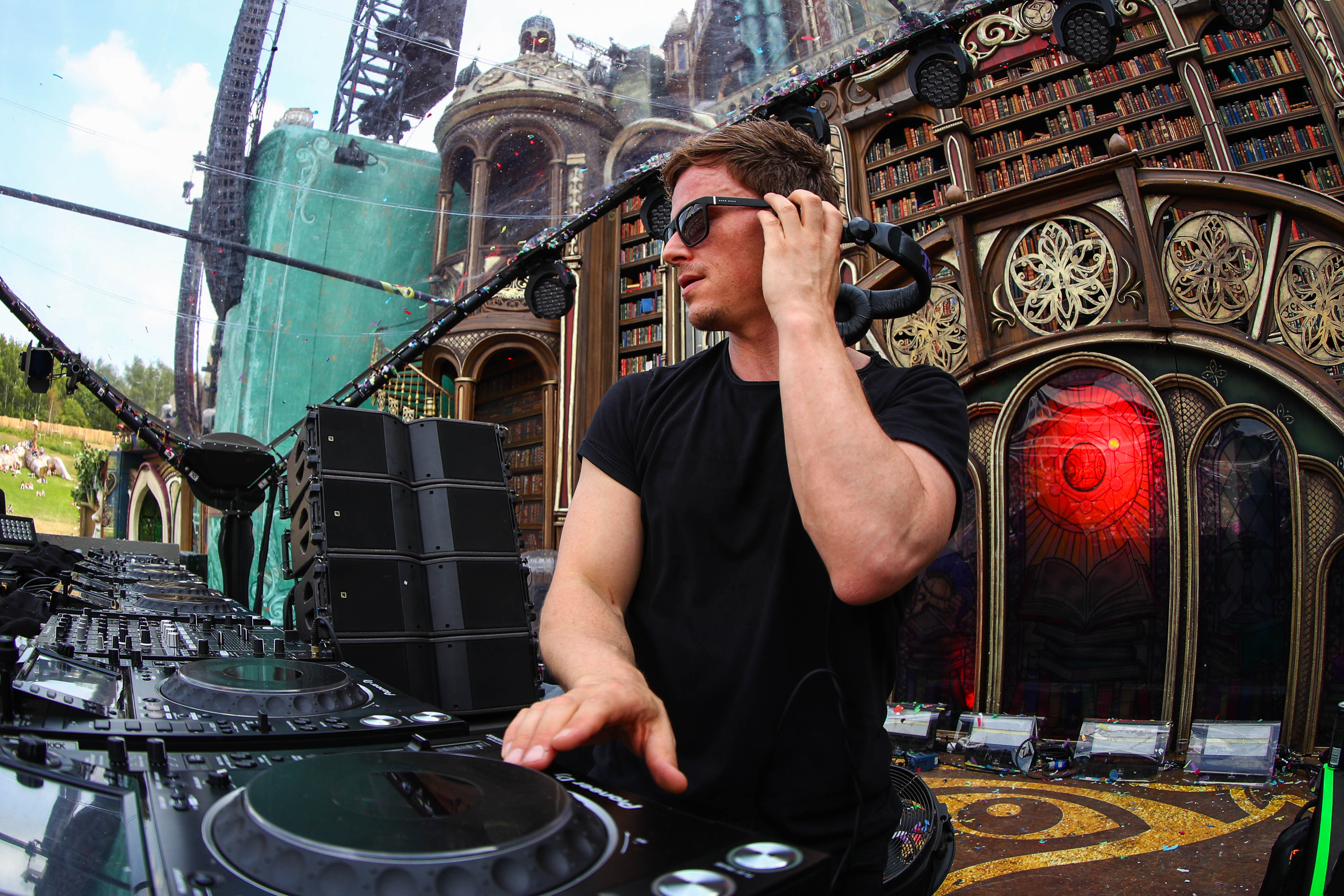
- Le Grand playing the 2019 Tomorrowland mainstage

Background information
- Born: Fedde Le Grand; 7 September 1977 (age 49); Utrecht, Netherlands
- Genres: House; Tech house; Electro house; Big room house; Progressive house; Pop; Funky house; Future house; Slap house
- Occupations: DJ; record producer; remixer
- Years active: 2002–present
- Labels: Flamingo; Ministry of Sound Australia; Toolroom; Ultra; Be Yourself; Spinnin'; Darklight
- Website: feddelegrand.com

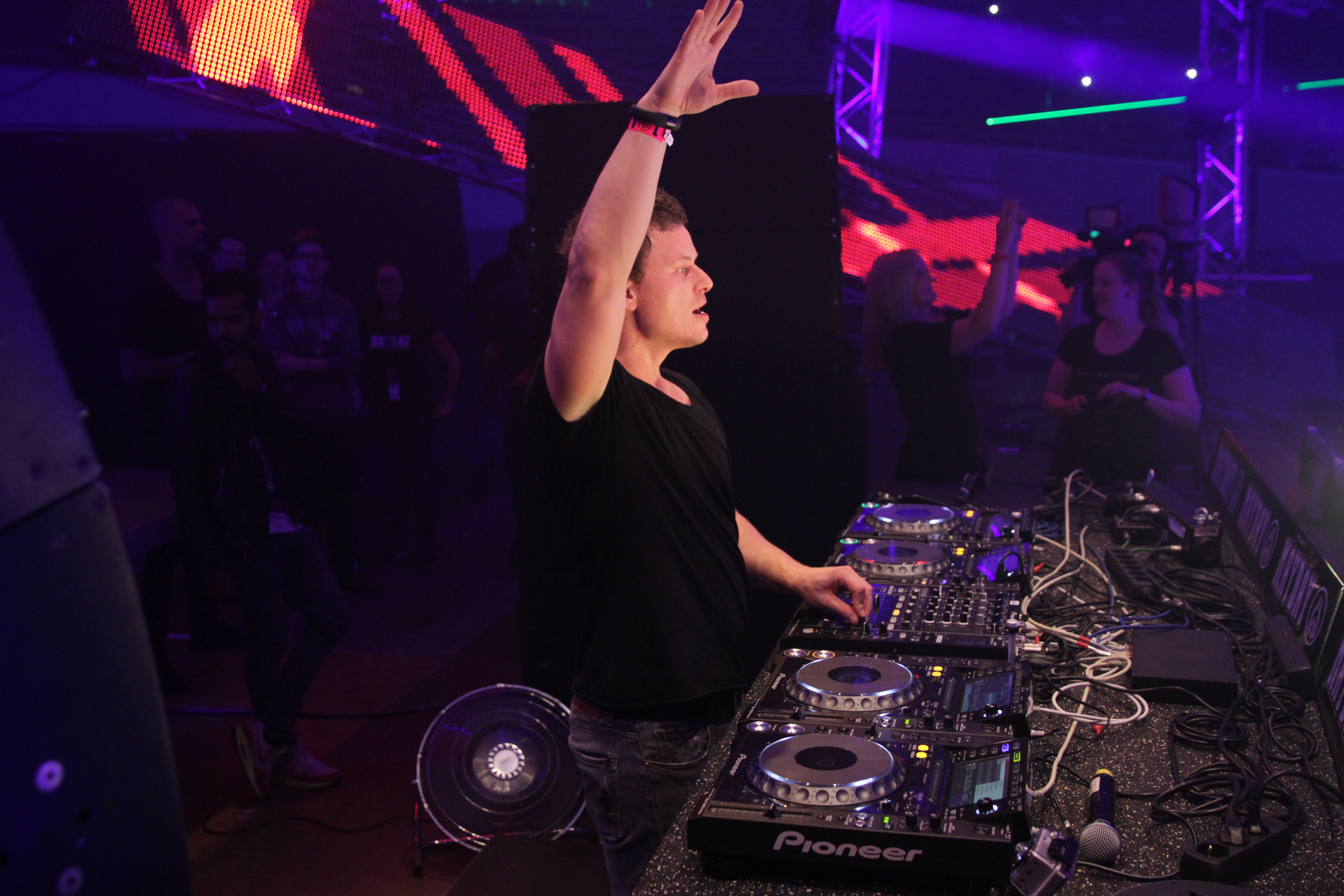
Le Grand in May 2014

Fedde Le Grand (/lə ˈɡrænd/, Dutch pronunciation: [ˈfɛdə lə ˈɡrɑ̃ː]; born 7 September 1977) is a Dutch house DJ, record producer and remixer.

In 2006, his single "Put Your Hands Up 4 Detroit" reached the top five on the Dutch Top 40, number one on the UK Singles Chart and stayed on the chart for 30 weeks, and spent five weeks on the dance charts in Spain.

== Discography ==
- Output (2009)
- Something Real (2016)

== Awards and nominations ==
| Award | Year | Category | Nominee(s) | Result | Ref. |
|---|---|---|---|---|---|
| Beatport Music Awards | 2012 | Best Remix | "Paradise" (Fedde Le Grand Remix) | Won | |
| Beatport Music Awards | 2012 | Best Techno Track | "Metrum" | Won | |
| Billboard Music Awards | 2008 | Top Hot Dance Airplay Track | "Let Me Think About It" | Won | |
| DJ Awards | 2007 | Best Breakthrough | Fedde Le Grand | Won | |
| DJ Awards | 2008 | Best House DJ | Fedde Le Grand | Nominated | |
| Danish Deejay Awards | 2008 | Danish Deejay-Favorite | "Let Me Think About It" | Won | |
| Danish Deejay Awards | 2008 | Dancechart.dk Award | "Let Me Think About It" | Won | |
| International Dance Music Awards | 2007 | Best Breakthrough Solo Artist | Fedde Le Grand | Won | |
| International Dance Music Awards | 2007 | Best Underground Dance Track | "Put Your Hands Up 4 Detroit" | Won | |
| International Dance Music Awards | 2007 | Best Breaks/Electro Dance Track | "Put Your Hands Up 4 Detroit" | Nominated | |
| International Dance Music Awards | 2008 | Best Breaks/Electro Dance Track | "Let Me Think About It" | Nominated | |
| International Dance Music Awards | 2015 | Best Progressive House/Electro DJ | Fedde Le Grand | Nominated | |
| MTV Australia Awards | 2007 | Best Dance Video | "Put Your Hands Up 4 Detroit" | Won | |
| MTV Europe Music Awards | 2009 | Best Dutch & Belgian Act | Fedde Le Grand | Nominated | |
| P3 Guld Awards | 2008 | Listener's Favorite Hit | "Let Me Think About It" | Nominated | |
| Zulu Awards | 2008 | Best Danish Hit | "Let Me Think About It" | Nominated | |

=== DJ Magazine ===
==== Top 100 DJs rankings ====
In DJ Magazine, Fedde Le Grand debuted on the rankings at 22nd in 2007.

| Position | Year | Movement |
|---|---|---|
| 22 | 2007 | New Entry |
| 29 | 2008 | Down 7 |
| 29 | 2009 | No Change |
| 21 | 2010 | Up 8 |
| 14 | 2011 | Up 7 |
| 26 | 2012 | Down 12 |
| 29 | 2013 | Down 3 |
| 35 | 2014 | Down 6 |
| 35 | 2015 | No Change |
| 50 | 2016 | Down 15 |
| 39 | 2017 | Up 11 |
| 22 | 2018 | Up 17 |
| 30 | 2019 | Down 8 |
| 23 | 2020 | Up 7 |
| 19 | 2021 | Up 4 |
| 19 | 2022 | No Change |
| 33 | 2023 | Down 14 |
| 40 | 2024 | Down 7 |
| 84 | 2025 | Down 44 |
