= Yellow Claw discography =

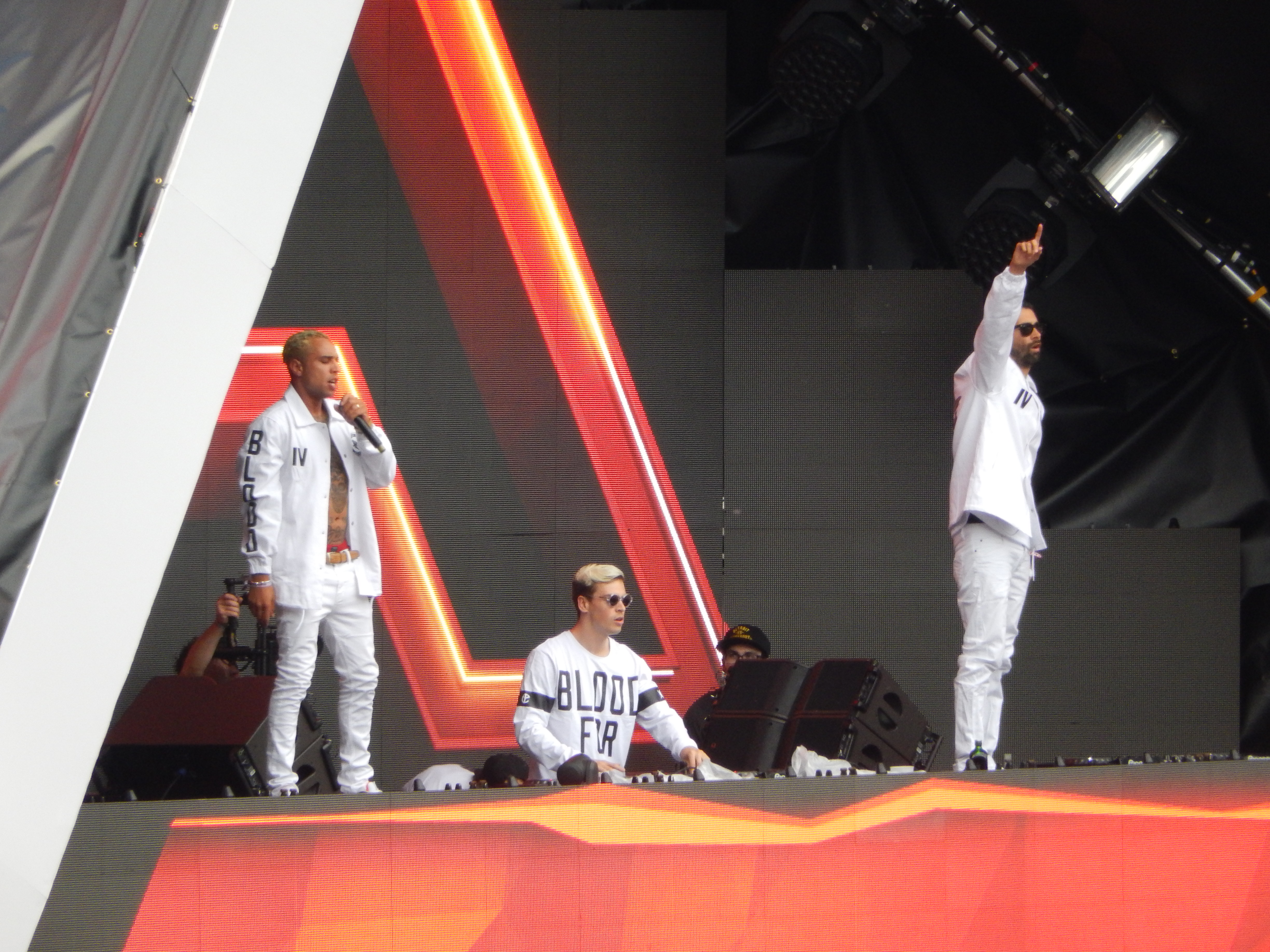
- Studio albums: 4
- EPs: 5
- Singles: 43

This is the discography for Dutch DJs Yellow Claw.

== Studio albums ==
Title	Details	Peak chart positions			
Title	Details	NLD	BEL	US	US Dance
Blood for Mercy	Released: 20 November 2015; Label: Mad Decent; Formats: Digital download, CD	27	48	187	1
Los Amsterdam	Released: 31 March 2017; Label: Mad Decent; Formats: Digital download, CD	8	91	143	3
New Blood	Released: 22 June 2018; Label: Barong Family; Formats: Digital download, CD	17	69	—	—
Never Dies	Released: 31 January 2020; Label: Barong Family; Formats: Digital download, CD, streaming	—	—	—	—
"—" denotes an album that did not chart or was not released.

== Extended plays ==
List of extended plays
Title	Details
Amsterdam Trap Music	Released: 3 March 2013; Label: Mad Decent; Formats: Digital download
Amsterdam Twerk Music	Released: 23 September 2013; Label: Mad Decent; Formats: Digital download
Amsterdam Trap Music, Vol 2	Released: 21 July 2014; Label: Mad Decent; Formats: Digital download
Legends (with Cesqeaux)	Released: 14 October 2014; Label: Dim Mak Records; Formats: Digital download
Eastzane Warriors (with Dirtcaps)	Released: 29 July 2015; Label: Barong Family; Formats: Digital download
Amsterdam Trap Music, Vol. 3	Released: 23 February 2018; Label: Barong Family; Formats: Digital download
Danger Days	Released: 8 March 2019; Label: Barong Family; Formats: Digital download
The Holy Bassgod	Released: 5 February 2021; Label: Barong Family; Formats: Digital download
The Black Delorean Project	Released: 10 December 2021; Label: Barong Family; Formats: Digital download

== Singles ==
List of singles as lead artist, with selected chart positions, showing year released and album name
Title	Year	Peak chart positions				Certifications	Album
Title	Year	NL 40	NL 100	BEL	US Dance	Certifications	Album
"Allermooiste Feestje" (featuring Mr. Polska and Ronnie Flex)	2012	—	—	—	—		Non-album singles
"Krokobil" (featuring Sjaak and Mr. Polska)	2012	12	5	40	—		Non-album singles
"Nooit Meer Slapen" (featuring Ronnie Flex, MocroManiac and Jebroer)	2012	38	31	—	—		Non-album singles
"Thunder" (with The Opposites)	2013	19	10	9	—		Slapeloze Nachten
"Last Night Ever" (with Lny Tnz)	2013	—	56	124	—		Non-album singles
"Dancefloor Champion" (with Yung Felix)	2013	—	—	—	—		Non-album singles
"Shotgun" (featuring Rochelle)	2013	10	9	20	—		Non-album singles
"Lick Dat" (with Mightyfools)	2014	—	—	—	—		Non-album singles
"Legends" (with Cesqeaux featuring Kalibwoy)	2014	—	—	—			Non-album singles
"Techno" (with Diplo and LNY TNZ featuring Waka Flocka Flame)	2014	—	—	—	—		Random White Dude Be Everywhere
"Till It Hurts" (featuring Ayden)	2014	7	5	23	31		Non-album singles
"Run Away"	2015	—	—	99	—		Non-album singles
"Wild Mustang" (with Cesqeaux featuring Becky G)	2015	—	64	—	—		Blood for Mercy
"No Class" (with Mightyfools)	2015	—	—	—	—		Non-album single
"Sin City"	2015	—	—	—	—		Blood for Mercy
"We Made It" (featuring Lil' Eddie)	2015	—	—	—	—		Blood for Mercy
"In My Room" (with DJ Mustard featuring Ty Dolla Sign and Tyga)	2015	—	—	99	12	RIAA: Gold	Blood for Mercy
"Catch Me" (with Flux Pavilion featuring Naaz)	2016	—	—	—	—		Blood for Mercy
"Invitation" (featuring Yade Lauren)	2016	—	82	—	37		Los Amsterdam
"Love & War" (featuring Yade Lauren)	2016	32	38	—	43		Los Amsterdam
"Good Day" (featuring DJ Snake and Elliphant)	2017	—	100	—	40		Los Amsterdam
"Light Years" (featuring Rochelle)	2017	—	—	—	—		Los Amsterdam
"City on Lockdown" (featuring Juicy J and Lil Debbie)	2017	—	—	—	—		Los Amsterdam
"Open" (featuring Moksi and Jonna Fraser)	2017	32	68	—	39		Los Amsterdam
"Lit" (with Steve Aoki featuring Gucci Mane and T-Pain)	2017	—	—	—	34		Steve Aoki Presents Kolony
"New World" (with Krewella featuring Taylor Bennett)	2017	—	—	—	29		Non-album single
"Both of Us" (featuring STORi)	2017	—	—	—	24		New Blood
"Villain" (featuring Valentina)	2018	—	—	—	—		New Blood
"Cry Wolf" (with DOLF featuring Sophie Simmons)	2018	—	—	—	—		Non-album single
"Summertime" (featuring San Holo)	2018	—	—	—	39		New Blood
"Crash This Party" (featuring Tabitha Nauser)	2018	—	—	—	—		New Blood
"Bittersweet" (featuring Sofía Reyes)	2018	—	—	—	—		New Blood
"Fake Chanel" (featuring ASAP Ferg and Creek Boyz)	2018	—	—	—	—		New Blood
"To the Max" (featuring MC Kekel, Lil Debbie, Bok Nero and MC Gustta)	2018	—	—	—	—		New Blood
"Public Enemy" (with DJ Snake)	2018	—	—	—	—		New Blood
"Waiting" (featuring Rochelle)	2018	—	—	—	—		New Blood
"Give It to Me" (with Nonsens)	2019	—	—	—	—		Danger Days EP
"We Can Get High" (with Galantis)	2019	—	—	—	—		Church
"Get Up" (featuring Kiddo)	2019	—	—	—	—		Never Dies
"Baila Conmigo" (featuring Saweetie, Inna and Jenn Morel)	2019	—	—	—	—		Never Dies
"Let's Get Married" (featuring Offset and Era Istrefi)	2019	—	—	—	—		Never Dies
"Amsterdamned"	2019	—	—	—	—		Never Dies
"El Terror" (featuring Jon Z and Lil Toe)	2019	—	—	—	—		Never Dies
"Take Me Back" (with Corsak featuring Julia Wu)	2020	—	—	—	—		Non-album single
"Supernoize" (with Juyen Sebulba featuring RayRay)	2020	—	—	—	—		Hard in Bangkok
"Rewind" (with Krewella)	2020	—	—	—	—		Non-album singles
"Hush" (with Weird Genius featuring Reikko)	2020	—	—	—	—		Non-album singles
"Kiss Your Lips" (with Tokyo Ghetto Pussy)	2020	—	—	—	—		Non-album singles
"I Want It" (with Wiwek)	2020	—	—	—	—		Non-album singles
"End Like This" (with Steve Aoki featuring Runn)	2020	—	—	—	—		Non-album singles
"Bassgod" (with Juyen Sebulba and Sihk featuring Ramengvrl)	2021	—	—	—	—		Non-album singles
"Drxgs" (featuring Sara Fajira)	2021	—	—	—	—		Non-album singles
"Trap Anthem"	2021	—	—	—	—		The Black DeLorean Project EP
"Twitter" (featuring Syaqish)	2021	—	—	—	—		Non-album singles
"No Limit" (with Dirty Audio featuring Bok Nero)	2021	—	—	—	—		Non-album singles
"It Ain't Safe" (with Dvbbs and Tavatli)	2024	—	—	—	—		Non-album singles
"—" denotes a recording that did not chart or was not released in that territory.

== Other charted songs ==
Title	Year	Peak chart positions	Album
Title	Year	FRA	Album
"Ocho Cinco" (DJ Snake featuring Yellow Claw)	2016	89	Encore

== Songwriting and production credits ==
Title	Year	Artist(s)	Album	Notes
"Cowbell" (with Juyen Sebulba)	2017	DOLF	Nighttime EP	
"If I Die" (with DJ Soda)	2017	DOLF	Nighttime EP	
"Good Love" (with Moksi)	2017	DOLF	Nighttime EP	
"Slippin"	2017	DOLF	Nighttime EP	
"Click Click"	2017	Stoltenhoff	The Prodigy	
"Balcony"	2017	Yade Lauren	Non-album single	
"We Go Up"	2017	LNY TNZ	Fvck Genres, Vol 2 EP	
"Dreams" (featuring Rochelle)	2018	DOLF and Weird Genius	Non-album single	
"Hail to the Victor"	2018	Thirty Seconds to Mars	America	
"Another You"	2018	DOLF	Non-album singles	
"Hero" (featuring JVZEL)	2018	The Galaxy	Non-album singles	
"Hurricane" (with The Galaxy)	2018	DOLF	Hurricane EP	
"Elastic"	2018	DOLF	Hurricane EP	
"Ego" (with Stoltenhoff)	2018	DOLF	Hurricane EP	
"Show It" (featuring Bok Nero)	2018	DOLF	Hurricane EP	
"Back to You"	2019	DOLF	Non-album single	
"Grey"	2019	Stori	Non-album single	
"Vacation"	2019	Nanami	Vol. 1	composed and written by Nils Rondhuis only
"Stay the Night"	2019	Nanami	Vol. 1	composed and written by Nils Rondhuis only
"Words"	2019	Nanami	Vol. 1	composed and written by Nils Rondhuis only
"Room 902"	2019	Nanami	Vol. 1	composed and written by Nils Rondhuis only
"Seventeen"	2019	DOLF	Non-album singles	
"Next to Me"	2020	DOLF	Non-album singles	
"Obsession"	2020	RayRay and DJ SODA	BF200	
"Belong" (featuring Nanami)	2020	Ghoster	BF200	composed and written by Nils Rondhuis only

== Remixes ==
Title	Year	Artist(s)
"Little Bit of This" (feat. Vince Staples) (Yellow Claw Remix)	2017	GTA
"Another Life" (feat. Ester Dean) (Yellow Claw Remix)	2017	Afrojack and David Guetta
"Love & War" (feat. Yade Lauren) (Yellow Claw G-Funk Remix)	2017	Yellow Claw
"No War" (feat. Jesse Royal) (Yellow Claw Remix)	2017	Noise Cans
"Booty Time" (Yellow Claw & Stoltenhoff Remix)	2018	Aazar and Cesqeaux
"Idwk" (Yellow Claw Remix)	2018	Dvbbs and Blackbear
