= Wiwek =

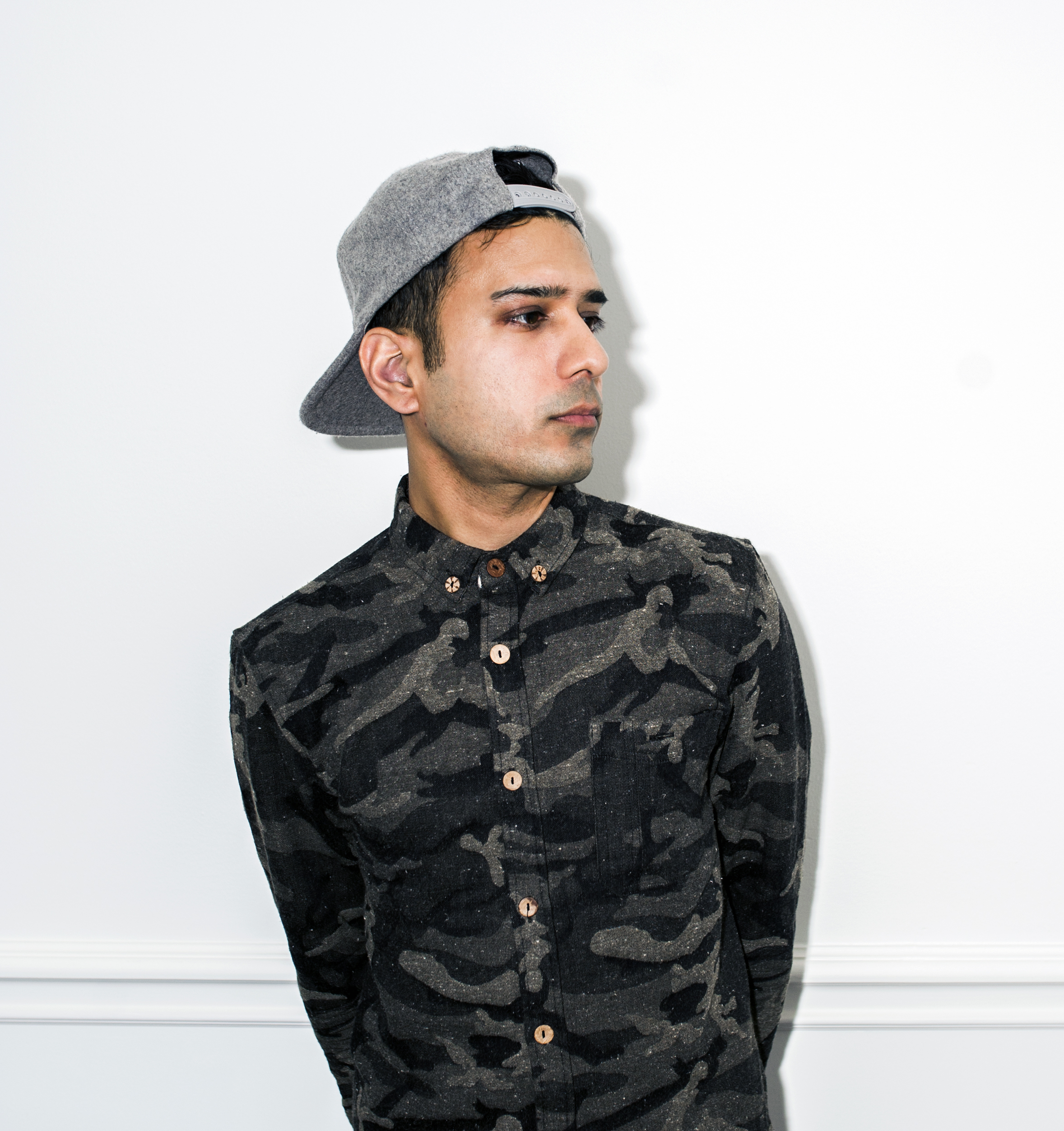

Background information
- Also known as: Oui'Wack
- Born: Wiwek Mahabali; Utrecht, Netherlands
- Genres: Jungle terror; Tribal housetrap; moombahton
- Occupations: Musician; DJ; record producer
- Instruments: Piano; guitar; synthesizer
- Years active: 2011–present
- Labels: Barong Family; Owsla; Rimbu; G-Rex; Spinnin' Records; Revealed Recordings; Maha Vana; Axtone; Mixmash Records
- Website: wiwek.com/

Wiwek Mahabali, better known mononymously as Wiwek, is a Dutch DJ and music producer based in Utrecht, Netherlands.

== Early life ==
Wiwek was born in the Netherlands and is of Indo-Surinamese descent. His father is a musician and singer who emigrated from the former Dutch colony of Suriname. His stage name was suggested by Gregor Salto that he use his given name for his musical career.

== Background ==
Wiwek is best known as the pioneer of, and his contributions to "jungle terror", a hybrid style of dance music characterized by offbeat kick drums, dissonant lead synths, and tribal drum and chant samples. His music has been released on such labels as Barong Family and Owsla, and led to collaborations with Skrillex and Yellow Claw. He is also the label head of his own jungle terror-based label Rimbu Recordings. He gained popularity in dance music and was known for 'fusing electronic elements with tropical rhythms'. He is regarded as the "Godfather of jungle terror".

Jungle terror was first created when Wiwek was playing and explaining his music to his friends. He then uploaded some songs to SoundCloud with the 'jungle terror' tag which eventually became popular.

== Career ==
=== 2014: Mad Decent ===
In 2014, Wiwek was signed to Diplo's Mad Decent record label as an artist. He collaborated with Gregor Salto to release the single "On Your Mark".

=== 2015: OWSLA ===
American dubstep DJ Skrillex had announced the signing of Wiwek to his record label "Owsla". Wiwek performed at the 2015 Ultra Music Festival in Miami. He had also hosted an episode on Tiësto's record label, Musical Freedom's radio show. He collaborated with Hardwell to release the single titled "Chameleon". On 28 April 2015, he released "Fire" as a single collaborating with Dutch DJ Alvaro via Steve Aoki's record label, Dim Mak Records. In November 2015, he collaborated with GTA to release "What We Tell Dem" as a single.

=== 2016-2019: Collaboration with Skrillex, Marshmello and debut album Cycles ===
On 19 February 2016, he collaborated with Dutch DJs Yellow Claw to release "Pop It" as a single. His OWSLA-debut extended play consisting of five songs, The Free and Rebellious which incorporates elements of drum and bass, was released a week later. The EP had received poor ratings in a review with only 1.5 star was given out of five.

Most recently, Wiwek's The Free and Rebellious EP was used as the soundtrack and score to the short film Still in the Cage which was filmed in Bangkok, Thailand, written and directed by Canadian filmmaker Jodeb and produced by Wiwek and Skrillex. The short film included Wiwek's collaboration with Skrillex, "Killa". It was premiered on 17 August at the theater at Ace Hotel Downtown Los Angeles. An official music video for "Killa", directed by Jonathan Desbiens was uploaded by Skrillex to YouTube. The single "Killa" features vocals from Swedish vocalist Elliphant. American trap producer Slushii, Boombox Cartel and Henry Fong have released remixes of the song.

He released his debut album, Cycles on 8 March 2019 through his record label Maha Vana. He was also featured on the track "Angklung Life" with American DJ Marshmello on the album Joytime III.

== Discography ==
=== Albums ===
Title	Details
Cycles	Released: 8 March 2019; Label: Maha Vana; Format: Digital download

=== Compilation albums ===
Title	Details	Peak chart positions
Title	Details	US Dance
Jungle Terror Saga	Released: 13 April 2018; Label: Barong Family; Format: Digital download, CD, vinyl	—

=== Extended plays ===
Title	Details	Peak chart positions
Title	Details	US Dance
Jungle Terror	Released: 6 October 2014; Label: Barong Family, Spinnin' Records; Format: Digital download, CD	—
Jungle Terror: Volume 2	Released: 16 March 2015; Label: Barong Family, Spinnin' Records; Format: Digital download, CD	—
The Free and Rebellious	Released: 26 February 2016; Label: Owsla; Format: Digital download, CD	17
Faka G / Double Dribble	Released: 1 February 2017; Label: OWSLA; Format: Digital download, CD	—
Drum Nation	Released: 28 July 2017; Label: OWSLA; Format: Digital download, CD	—
Jungle Terror: Volume 3	Released: 1 December 2017; Label: Barong Family; Format: Digital download, CD	—
Get Out of the Way / Wan Tu (with Chocolate Puma)	Released: 21 May 2018; Label: Spinnin' Records; Format: Digital download, CD	—
Jungle Terror: Volume 4	Released: 18 September 2020; Label: Barong Family; Format: Digital download, CD	—
Time Machine Drums	Released: 10 September 2021; Label: Axtone; Format: Digital download	—
Jungle Terror: Volume 5	Released: 03 May 2024; Label: Barong Family; Format: Digital download, CD	—
"—" denotes a recording that did not chart or was not released.

=== Singles ===
Title	Year	Album
"Maguas Revenge"	2012	Non-album singles
"Obambo"	2012	Non-album singles
"Totem"	2012	Non-album singles
"Mangrove"	2012	Non-album singles
"Hurricane" (with Rishi Romero)	2012	Non-album singles
"Batman" (with Rishi Romero)	2012	Non-album singles
"Salomon Beach"	2012	Non-album singles
"Secret Meadow"	2012	Non-album singles
"Pleistocene"	2012	Non-album singles
"Koala"	2012	Non-album singles
"Zombiekids"	2012	Non-album singles
"Puma"	2012	Non-album singles
"Tarantula"	2012	Non-album singles
"Magadha"	2013	Non-album singles
"Trommelboy"	2013	Non-album singles
"Angry Birdz"	2013	Non-album singles
"Mango Chutney"	2013	Non-album singles
"Intimi" (with Gregor Salto)	2013	Non-album singles
"Terminator" (with Moska)	2013	Non-album singles
"FOK"	2013	Non-album singles
"Mufazi"	2013	Non-album singles
"Ritual" (with Cesqeaux)	2013	Non-album singles
"Salute"	2014	Non-album singles
"On Your Mark" (with Gregor Salto)	2014	Non-album singles
"Annihilation" (with Nom De Strip)	2014	Non-album singles
"G.M.A.F.B."	2014	Non-album singles
"Bad Gyal" (with Jeremia Jones featuring Kalibwoy)	2014	Non-album singles
"So You Want Drums" (featuring MC Vocab)	2014	Non-album singles
"Ground Shake" (featuring Stush)	2014	Non-album singles
"Ragga"	2014	Non-album singles
"Bang Bang Theory"	2015	Non-album singles
"What We Tell Dem" (with GTA featuring Stush)	2015	Non-album singles
"Fire" (with Alvaro)	2015	Non-album singles
"Miami" (with Gregor Salto)	2015	Non-album singles
"Chameleon" (with Hardwell)	2015	Non-album singles
"Trouble" (with Gregor Salto featuring MC Spyder)	2015	Non-album singles
"Tropicana" (with Valentino Khan)	2016	Non-album singles
"Rebels" (featuring Audio Bullys)	2016	The Free and Rebellious
"How It Goes" (with Gregor Salto featuring Stush)	2016	Non-album singles
"Getho Circus"	2016	Non-album singles
"Faka G / Double Dribble"	2017	Non-album singles
"Run"	2017	HOWSLA
"Drum Nation" (featuring WatchTheDuck)	2017	Drum Nation EP
"Ni de Coña" (with Mike Cervello)	2017	Jungle Terror: Volume 3
"So Hot" (with Gregor Salto and Kuenta I Tambu featuring Spyder)	2018	Non-album single
"Black Panther" (with Kuenta I Tambu)	2018	Cycles
"Rise" (featuring Stush and Kuenta I Tambu)	2018	Cycles
"I Want It" (with Yellow Claw)	2021	Non-album singles
"Periphery"	2021	Non-album singles

=== Remixes ===
==== 2013 ====
- Moska – Sick Kick (Wiwek Remix) [Mad Decent]

==== 2014 ====
- Yellow Claw featuring Rochelle – Shotgun (Wiwek Remix) [SPRS]
- Leftside – Monkey Biznizz (Wiwek Remix) [Mad Decent]
- Yellow Claw featuring Lil Eddie – Never Dies (Wiwek Remix) [Mad Decent]

==== 2015 ====
- Katy Tiz – Whistle (While You Work It) (Wiwek Remix) [Atlantic Records]
- Gregor Salto – Afrobot (Wiwek Remix) [DOORN Records]
- Etnik featuring Mykki Blanco – Unclassified (Wiwek Remix) [OWSLA]
- Martin Solveig & GTA – Intoxicated (Wiwek Remix) [Spinnin' Remixes]
- Sauti Sol – Sura Yako (Wiwek Remix)
- Cash Cash featuring BOB, Busta Rhymes & Neon Hitch – Devil (Wiwek Remix) [BIG BEAT]

==== 2016 ====
- Firebeatz and Chocolate Puma featuring BISHØP – Lullaby (Wiwek Remix) [Spinnin' Remixes]
- Getter – Rip N Dip (Wiwek Remix) [OWSLA]
- Skrillex and Diplo featuring Kai – Mind (Wiwek Remix) [OWSLA / Mad Decent]

==== 2017 ====
- A R I Z O N A – Oceans Away (Wiwek Remix) [Atlantic Records]
- Bro Safari, Dillon Francis & Salvatore Ganacci – XL (Wiwek Remix) [Bro Safari Music]
- Mike Cervello – Moodswing (Wiwek Remix) [Barong Family]
- Axwell Λ Ingrosso - More Than You Know (Wiwek Remix) [Virgin EMI]

==== 2019 ====
- Kiwi - Witch's Lesson (Wiwek Remix)
