= Random White Dude Be Everywhere =

Compilation album by Diplo
- Released: July 29, 2014
- Genre: Electronic, hip hop
- Length: 46:41
- Label: Mad Decent
- Producer: Diplo, Alvaro, Yellow Claw, LNY TNZ, Steve Aoki, Deorro, GTA, Danny Diggz, Thugli, Rickyxsan, Tony Romera, Party Favor

Diplo chronology
Blow Your Head: Diplo Presents Dubstep (2010)	Random White Dude Be Everywhere (2014)	Skrillex and Diplo Present Jack Ü (2015)

Singles from Random White Dude Be Everywhere
- 1. "Express Yourself" Released: July 16, 2012; 2. "Boy Oh Boy" Released: October 7, 2013; 3. "Revolution" Released: January 21, 2014; 4. "Freak" Released: March 18, 2014; 5. "Techno" Released: November 5, 2014; 6. "Biggie Bounce" Released: February 3, 2015

Random White Dude Be Everywhere is a compilation album by Diplo. It was released on Mad Decent on July 29, 2014. It debuted at number 2 on Billboard's Dance/Electronic Albums chart.

== Production ==
The album includes collaborations with Faustix, Imanos, Kai, Kstylis, Alvaro, Waka Flocka Flame, Yellow Claw, LNY TNZ, Steve Bays, Steve Aoki, Deorro, GTA, Angger Dimas, Travis Porter, and Nicky Da B. It also includes remixes by Danny Diggz, Thugli, Rickyxsan, Tony Romera, and Party Favor.

The album's title comes from a YouTube comment posted on one of Diplo's videos.

== Critical reception ==
Professional ratings
Review scores
Source	Rating
AllMusic	3.5/5 stars
Consequence of Sound	C
HipHopDX	3.0/5
PopMatters	2/10 stars
Vice (Expert Witness)	A−

David Jeffries of AllMusic gave the album 3.5 out of 5 stars, calling it "a worthy round-up time capsule that works best when consumed in two EP-sized bites or parted out for mixtapes." Writing for Vice, Robert Christgau summarised it as "seven proven bangers gussied up with five remixes – in short, the obvious shit his base long ago had enough of d/b/a music for normal people seeking a pick-me-up. I suppose we could do without the remixes, but hell, excess is why he's richer than he is famous, and they're certainly not painful." Meanwhile, Colin Fitzgerlad of PopMatters gave the album 2 out of 10 stars, saying, "unlike much of Diplo's work, none of the songs on Random White Dude Be Everywhere are unique or extraordinary in any perceivable way."

== Track listing ==
No.	Title	Artist(s)	Length
1.	"Revolution" (featuring Faustix, Imanos and Kai)	Diplo	4:24
2.	"6th Gear" (featuring Kstylis)	Diplo and Alvaro	3:32
3.	"Techno" (featuring Waka Flocka Flame)	Yellow Claw, Diplo and LNY TNZ	3:28
4.	"Freak" (featuring Steve Bays)	Steve Aoki, Diplo and Deorro	4:41
5.	"Boy Oh Boy"	Diplo and GTA	2:54
6.	"Biggie Bounce" (featuring Angger Dimas and Travis Porter)	Diplo	3:45
7.	"Express Yourself" (featuring Nicky Da B)	Diplo	4:38
8.	"Revolution (Danny Diggz Remix)" (featuring Faustix, Imanos and Kai)	Diplo	3:13
9.	"Boy Oh Boy (Thugli Remix)"	Diplo and GTA	3:18
10.	"Freak (Rickyxsan Remix)" (featuring Steve Bays)	Steve Aoki, Diplo and Deorro	5:12
11.	"Biggie Bounce (Tony Romera Remix)" (featuring Angger Dimas and Travis Porter)	Diplo	4:30
12.	"Express Yourself (Party Favor Extended Remix)" (featuring Nicky Da B)	Diplo	3:16

== Charts ==
Chart	Peak position
Belgian Albums (Ultratop Flanders)	132
US Billboard 200	155
US Independent Albums (Billboard)	24
US Top Dance Albums (Billboard)	2
