= Los Amsterdam =

Studio album by Yellow Claw
- Released: 2017
- Producer: Yellow Claw (also exex.); The Galaxy; DJ Snake; Moksi; Cesqeaux; GTA

Yellow Claw chronology
Blood for Mercy (2015)	Los Amsterdam (2017)	New Blood (2018)

Los Amsterdam is the second studio album by Dutch electronic music ensemble Yellow Claw. The album features collaborations with The Galaxy, DJ Snake, Moksi, Cesqeaux and GTA.

== Track listing ==
Standard version
No.	Title	Writer(s)	Producer(s)	Length
1.	"Home" (featuring Sophie Simmons)	Nils Rondhuis; Jim Taihuttu; Sophie Simmons; Thom van der Bruggen	Yellow Claw	3:44
2.	"Without You" (featuring The Galaxy & Gia Koka)	Rondhuis; Taihuttu; van der Bruggen; Arjen Lubach; Sacha Harland; Natalia Koronowska	Yellow Claw; The Galaxy	3:29
3.	"Love & War" (featuring Yade Lauren)	Rondhuis; Taihuttu; van der Bruggen; Raphaella Mazaheri-Asadi; Sky Adams; Léon Paul Palmen	Yellow Claw	4:17
4.	"Good Day" (featuring DJ Snake & Elliphant)	Rondhuis; Taihuttu; van der Bruggen; William Grigahcine; Ellinor Olovsdotter	Yellow Claw; DJ Snake	3:48
5.	"Open" (featuring Moksi & Jonna Fraser)	Rondhuis; Taihuttu; van der Bruggen; Ray “August Grant” Jacobs; Samir Ait Moh Nait Lhaj; Diego Stijnen; Joris Titawano; Rubin Brutus Karl; Sham “Sak Pase” Joseph	Yellow Claw; Moksi	3:30
6.	"City On Lockdown" (featuring Juicy J & Lil Debbie)	Rondhuis; Taihuttu; van der Bruggen; Jordan Capozzi; Jordan Michael Houston; Daniel Tuparia	Yellow Claw	3:15
7.	"Friends In The Dark" (featuring Otis Parker)	Rondhuis; Taihuttu; van der Bruggen; Scott Effman; Yannis Constantinou; Titawano	Yellow Claw	3:06
8.	"Stacks" (featuring Quavo, Cesqeaux & Tinie Tempah)	Rondhuis; Taihuttu; van der Bruggen; Tuparia; Quavious Marshall; Patrick Chukwuem Okogwu	Yellow Claw; Cesqeaux	4:17
9.	"Last Paradise" (featuring Sody)	Rondhuis; Taihuttu; van der Bruggen; Sophie Morgan Dyson; Effman	Yellow Claw	2:43
10.	"Light Years" (featuring Rochelle)	Rondhuis; Taihuttu; Max Oude Weernink; Martijn Van Sonderen; Nik Roos; Thijs De Vlieger; David Quiñones; Jazelle Paris; Erika Nuri Taylor	Yellow Claw	2:53
11.	"Hold On To Me" (featuring GTA)	Rondhuis; Taihuttu; van der Bruggen; Tori Rae Diaz; Matt Toth; Julio Meija	Yellow Claw; GTA	3:44
12.	"Rose Horizon" (featuring STORi)	Rondhuis; Taihuttu; van der Bruggen; Diaz; Weernink	Yellow Claw	2:49
13.	"Invitation" (featuring Yade Lauren)	Rondhuis; Taihuttu; Titawano; Diaz	Yellow Claw	2:32

== Chart history ==
Details	Peak chart positions			
Details	NLD	BEL	US	US Dance
Released: 31 March 2017; Label: Mad Decent; Formats: Digital download, CD	8	91	143	3
