= Public Enemy No. 1 =

Public Enemy No. 1, or variants, may refer to:

- Public enemy, a term to describe dangerous criminals, particularly in the U.S. in the 1930s

== People designated Public Enemy No. 1 ==
- Al Capone, declared "Public Enemy No. 1" by Chicago in 1930
- Angelo Meli, declared "Public Enemy No. 1" by Detroit in 1930
- Joseph DiCarlo, declared "Public Enemy No. 1" by Buffalo Police Commissioner Austin J. Roche in 1932
- Dutch Schultz, declared "Public Enemy No. 1" by the FBI in 1933
- John Dillinger, declared "Public Enemy No. 1" by the FBI in 1934
- Pretty Boy Floyd, declared "Public Enemy No. 1" by the FBI after the death of Dillinger
- Baby Face Nelson, declared "Public Enemy No. 1" by the FBI after the death of Floyd
- Alvin Karpis, declared "Public Enemy No. 1" by the FBI after the death of Nelson
- Salvatore "Lucky Luciano" Lucania, declared "Public Enemy No. 1" by New York special prosecutor Thomas Dewey in 1936
- Osama bin Laden, declared "Public Enemy No. 1" by the U.S. after the September 11 attacks
- Joaquín "El Chapo" Guzmán, declared "Public Enemy No. 1" by the Chicago Crime Commission in 2013

== Arts and entertainment ==
=== Film and television ===
- The Public Enemy, a 1931 pre code gangster film by William A. Wellman
- "Public Enemy Number One", a 1981 documentary film by David Bradbury (film maker)
- "Public Enemy #1", a 2002 episode of American Experience
- Mesrine: Public Enemy Number One, the second part of the 2008 film Mesrine
- Public Enemy Number One (film), a 2019 documentary

=== Music ===
- "Public Enemy Number One", a song and a character from the 1934 Cole Porter musical Anything Goes
- "Public Enemy No. 1" (Megadeth song), 2011
- Public Enemy #1, a 2007 mixtape by Cam'ron
- "Public Enemy #1", a song by Eminem from the 2006 album Eminem Presents: The Re-Up
- "Public Enemy #1", a song by Mötley Crüe from the 1981 album Too Fast for Love
- "Public Enemy No. 1" (Public Enemy song), a song by Public Enemy from the 1987 album Yo! Bum Rush the Show
- "Public Enemy No. 1", a song by Rory Gallagher from the 1979 album Top Priority
- "Staatsfeind Nr. 1", (German, 'Public Enemy No. 1'), a 2005 album and its title track by Bushido

== Other uses ==
- Public Enemy No. 1 (street gang), a criminal gang in California formed in the 1980s

== See also ==
- Public Enemy (disambiguation)
- Enemy of the people (disambiguation)
