= Public Enemy (disambiguation) =

Public Enemy is an American hip hop group.

Public Enemy or Public Enemies may also refer to:

- Public enemy, a phrase to describe dangerous criminals and similar outlaws

== Film ==
- The Public Enemy, a 1931 American film
- Public Enemies (1941 film), an American comedy film
- Public Enemies (1996 film), an American crime film about Ma Barker
- Public Enemy (2002 film), a South Korean film
- Public Enemies (2009 film), an American crime drama about John Dillinger
- Superman/Batman: Public Enemies a 2009 animated superhero film

== Literature ==
- Public Enemies, a children's novel by Gordon Korman in the On the Run series 2005–06
- Public Enemies: Dueling Writers Take on Each Other and the World, a 2008 book by Bernard-Henri Lévy with Michel Houellebecq
- Public Enemies: America's Greatest Crime Wave and the Birth of the FBI, 1933–34, a 2004 book by Bryan Burrough
- "Public Enemies", a story arc of Superman/Batman

== Music ==
- Public Enemies (group), a Norwegian rhythm and blues group
- "Public Enemies", a 2020 song by Farid Bang
- "Public Enemy", a 1972 song by James Brown
- "Public Enemy", a 2018 song by Yellow Claw

== Television ==
- Public Enemies (TV series), a 2012 British drama series
- Public Enemy (TV series), a 2016 Belgian crime series
- "Public Enemy", a 2012 episode of The Glades
- "Public Enemy" (Arrow), a 2015 episode of Arrow

== Other uses ==
- The Public Enemy (professional wrestling), a tag team
- Ryan Wedding (born 1981), drug trafficker nicknamed "Public Enemy"

== See also ==
- Enemy of the people (disambiguation)
- Enemy of the state (disambiguation)
- Public Enemy No. 1 (disambiguation)
- Public nuisance, a type of law offence
