= Enemies of the People =

Enemies of the People may refer to:

- Enemies of the People (headline), the headline of a Daily Mail (UK) article in 2016
- Enemies of the People (film), a documentary about the Khmer Rouge era in Cambodia

== See also ==
- Enemy of the people (disambiguation)
