= Alvaro (DJ) =

Dutch record producer & DJ (born 1987)

- Born: Jasper Helderman; January 27, 1987 (age 39); Almere, Netherlands
- Genres: Electro house; EDM; progressive house; big room house; moombahton; Dutch house; trap
- Occupations: Musician; DJ; record producer
- Instruments: Keyboards; piano; guitar
- Years active: 2008–present
- Labels: Spinnin' Records; Revealed Recordings; Musical Freedom; Doorn Records; Wall Recordings; Barong Family
- Website: djalvaro.com

Jasper Helderman (born January 27, 1987), better known by his stage name Alvaro (stylized as ΛLVΛRO), is a Dutch record producer, songwriter, and DJ. His music is mostly electro house and progressive house. He is best known for his single "Welcome to the Jungle" (featuring Mercer and Lil Jon), which reached #3 on the Beatport main chart in June 2013 on Hardwell’s Revealed Recordings. He also produced "The Underground" on Spinnin' Records and more recently "Guest List" on Tiësto's label Musical Freedom, all of which ended up in the top 5 of the Beatport top 100.

Alvaro released tracks on labels such as Spinnin' Records, Revealed Recordings, and Musical Freedom.

He has played in the biggest clubs around the world and festivals like EDC Las Vegas, Electric Zoo NY, Ultra Music Festival, and Tomorrowland. He also worked with artists like MIA, Diplo, Major Lazer, will.i.am, Far East Movement, and Lil Jon.

== Biography ==
=== Early life ===
Helderman was born in Almere, Netherlands. When he was 18 years old, he began planning and designing websites. As a teenager, he discovered his passion for DJing while doing graphic design for festivals. Afterwards, he quickly went from editing after movies to producing his own songs.

=== Music career ===
His first residency was at Club Hardersplaza in Harderwijk in 2008. In October 2009, he released his remix of the song “Took the Night” by Chelley on Spinnin' Records which turned out to be his breakthrough track in the Netherlands as well as other parts of the world. Thereafter, he toured Brazil, Morocco, Australia, and Asia.

Since his release of “Make the Crowd Go” on Spinnin' Records, his music was picked up by artists like Tiësto and Hardwell. In January 2013, he was part of the Tiësto Club Live College invasion alongside Tiësto, Tommy Trash, and Quintino. In that same year, he worked together with Tiësto and Quintino to produce the anthem of Ultra Music Festival.

== Awards and nominations ==
| Year | Award | Nominated work | Category | Result |
|---|---|---|---|---|
| 2015 | DJ Mag | Alvaro | Top 101-150 DJs | No. 120 |

== Discography ==
=== Singles ===
==== Charted singles ====
| Year | Title | Peak chart positions | | | | | | | | | | | Album |
| Year | Title | NLD | AUS | AUT | BEL (Vl) | BEL (Wa) | FIN | FRA | GER | IRL | SWE | SWI | Album |
|---|---|---|---|---|---|---|---|---|---|---|---|---|---|
| 2009 | "Make It Funky" | 11^{[A]} | — | — | — | — | — | — | — | — | — | — | Non-album singles |
| 2010 | "Dubbelfrisss" (with Afro Bro's and DJ Kid) | 13^{[A]} | — | — | — | — | — | — | — | — | — | — | Non-album singles |
| 2010 | "Lucky Star" (with The Partysquad) | 89 | — | — | — | — | — | — | — | — | — | — | Non-album singles |
| 2010 | "I Want You" (with Chaosz) | 79 | — | — | — | — | — | — | — | — | — | — | Non-album singles |
| 2012 | "Wataah" (with The Partysquad) | 30^{[A]} | — | — | — | — | — | — | — | — | — | — | Non-album singles |
| 2013 | "Welcome to the Jungle" (with Mercer featuring Lil Jon) | — | — | — | 19^{[B]} | 11^{[B]} | — | — | — | — | — | — | Non-album singles |
| 2014 | "Ready for Action" (with Joey Dale) | — | — | — | 30^{[B]} | — | — | — | — | — | — | — | Non-album singles |
"—" denotes a recording that did not chart or was not released in that territory.

==== Other singles ====
2009

- "Ultimate Rise" (with Luxx) (Samsobeats)

2010

- "Dubbelfris" (with Afro Bro’s and DJ Kid) (PM Music)
- "Can You Feel It" (with Quintino) (Supersoniq)
- "I Want You" (with Chaosz) (Squeeze Music)
- "Lucky Star" (with The Partysquad)

2011

- "Cubata" (with DJ Punish) (Foktop! Records)
- "F*cking Ghetto" (featuring Lil Jon) (Dirty Dutch Music)
- "With My Hands Up" (featuring will.i.am and Lil Jon)
- "Ready 4 This" (with Artistic Raw) (Spinnin’ Records)

2012

- "Wataah" (with The Partysquad) (Spinnin’ Records)
- "Badman" (with The Partysquad) (Mad Decent)
- "Show Me Love" (Far East Movement featuring Alvaro) (Interscope Records)
- "Voodoo People" (DOORN Records)
- "Make the Crowd Go" (Spinnin’ Records)
- "Pay Attention to the Drums" (Mixmash Records)
- "Make Me Jump" (Musical Freedom)

2013

- "Rock Music" (Revealed Recordings)
- "United" (with Tiësto and Quintino)
- "World in Our Hands" (with Quintino) (Spinnin’ Records)
- "Nanana" (with MOTi) (Hysteria Records)
- "Welcome to the Jungle" (with Mercer and Lil Jon) (Revealed Recordings)
- "Out of Control" (with TST) (Musical Freedom)

2014

- "Ready for Action" (with Joey Dale) (Spinnin' Records)
- "Charged" (with GLOWINTHEDARK) (Powerhouse Music)
- "Shades" (Musical Freedom)
- "The Underground" (with Carnage) (Spinnin' Records)
- "6th Gear" (with Diplo and KSTYLIS) (Mad Decent)
- "Dagga" (with Dirtcaps) (Smash the House)
- "Oldskool" (with Van Dalen) (DOORN Records)

2015

- "Guest List" (with JETFIRE) (Musical Freedom)
- "Brah" (with Dirtcaps) (Mad Decent)
- "Fire" (with Wiwek) (Dim Mak)
- "Boomshakatak" (with Wiwek featuring MC Spyder) (Barong Family)
- "Take U" (with D-Wayne) (Wall Recordings)
- "Flags Up" (with Yellow Claw and Dirtcaps) (Barong Family)

2016

- "In Mijn Systeem" (with Lady Bee & Jebroer) (Sony Music)
- "Married to the Streets" (with Reid Stefan) (Metanoia Music)
- "Vegas" (with JETFIRE & Lil Jon) (Spinnin’ Records)
- "Kingdom" (with The Partysquad) (Dim Mak)
- "Wildlife" (with FIGHT CLVB) (Dim Mak)
- "Concrete Jungle" (with Gianni Marino) (Dim Mak)
- "Lights Out" (with The Partysquad) (Rebel Yard)

2017

- "Watching You" (with Faustix) (Warner Music)
- "Runaway" (featuring James Francis) (Universal Music B.V.)
- "No Way" (featuring James Francis) (Universal Music B.V.)

2018

- "Dem Shots" (with Quintino) (Spinnin’ Records)
- "Niet Mijn Taal" (with The Partysquad featuring Mr. Polska & ROLLÀN) (Top Notch)
- "Beatback" (with Dani L. Mebius) (Spinnin' Records)

=== Remixes ===
2009

- Chelley - Took The Night (Alvaro Remix) (Ministry Of Sound)
- Brothers D and Schmoove - Wanna Lick It (Alvaro Remix) (PM Music)
- Pizetta - Klezmer featuring Reagadelica (Alvaro Arabian Nights Remix) (Sneaker MUZIK)
- Major Lazer - Keep Goin' Louder featuring Niña Sky & Ricky Blaze (Alvaro Remix) (Mad Decent)

2010

- Tony Junior & Nicolas Nox - Loesje (Alvaro Remix) (Rodeo Media)
- Dzeko & Torres - Again featuring Majid (Alvaro Remix) (Starter Records)
- Missy Elliott - Get Your Freak On (Alvaro & Punish Moombahton Remix)
- Usher featuring will.i.am - OMG (Oh My Gosh) (Alvaro Dirty House Bootleg)

2011

- Dada Life - White Noise / Red Meat (Alvaro Remix) (Dim Mak Records)
- Munchi - Shottass featuring MR. LEXX (Alvaro Remix) (T&A Records)
- Dillon Francis & Diplo featuring Maluca - Que Que (Alvaro Remix) (Mad Decent)
- Sak Noel - Loca People (Alvaro Remix)
- The Black Eyed Peas - The Time (Dirty Bit) (Alvaro Bootleg)
- Pitbull featuring Ne-Yo, Nayer, and Afrojack - Give Me Everything (Tonight) (Alvaro Remix)
- Far East Movement featuring Dev - Like A G6 (Alvaro Remix)

2012

- Yellow Claw featuring Sjaak & Mr. Polska - Krokobil (Alvaro & Naffz Remix)
- Tyga - Rack City (Alvaro Remix)
- Pitbull - Back In Time (Alvaro Remix)
- Pitbull featuring T-Pain - Hey Baby (Drop It To The Floor) (Alvaro Remix)
- Zedd featuring Heather Bright - Stars Come Out (Alvaro Remix)
- Billy The Kid, Duvall, Stennis - Higher (Alvaro Remix) (Positivia)

2013

- The Partysquad featuring Jayh, Sjaak and Reverse - Helemaal Naar de Klote (Alvaro Remix)
- PSY - Gangnam Style (Alvaro Bootleg)

2014

- The Kickstarts, Vogue - Freaks (Alvaro Remix) [Big Alliance Records]
- Iggy Azalea featuring Rita Ora - Black Widow (Alvaro Trap Bootleg)

2015

- Yo Yo Honey Singh - Yaar Na Milay (Alvaro Remix)
- The Partysquad featuring Jayh, Reverse, Mocormaniac, Cho and Bokoesam - Dat Is Dat Ding (Alvaro Remix)
- Moksi - Brace Yourself (Alvaro Remix)

2018

- Cashmere Cat & Major Lazer featuring Tory Lanez - Miss You (Major Lazer & Alvaro Remix)
