= New Blood (Yellow Claw album) =

Studio album by Yellow Claw
- Released: 22 June 2018
- Recorded: 2017–2018
- Genre: Future bass; trap
- Length: 44:46
- Label: Barong Family
- Producer: Yellow Claw; San Holo; DJ Snake; Chace; Moksi

Yellow Claw album chronology
Los Amsterdam (2017)	New Blood (2018)	Never Dies (2020)

Singles from New Blood
- 1. "Summertime" Released: 4 May 2018; 2. "Crash This Party" Released: 11 May 2018; 3. "Bittersweet" Released: 18 May 2018; 4. "Fake Chanel" Released: 25 May 2018; 5. "To The Max" Released: 1 June 2018; 6. "Public Enemy" Released: 8 June 2018; 7. "Waiting" Released: 15 June 2018

New Blood is the third studio album from Dutch electronic music duo Yellow Claw. The album was released on 22 June 2018 through Barong Family. It features collaborations with producers, San Holo, DJ Snake, Chace and Moksi. New Blood was produced as a musical travelogue by the duo, reflecting their experiences around the world during their global tours. Seven singles were released with the record: "Summertime", "Crash This Party", "Bittersweet", "Fake Chanel", "To The Max", "Public Enemy", and "Waiting".

== Critical reception ==
Dancing Astronaut quoted that the album felt "more diverse in scope than what one would usually experience at a Yellow Claw set" and consisted of tracks which "fall in line with their signature sound without stretching too far outside their comfort zone". They affirmed that rather than being a "terrible listen", the record was "more than entertaining, with its future bass valleys and rap-assisted, trap peaks." Matthew Meadow of Your EDM praised the "healthy combination of hype versus mellow tracks" and the "generous helping" of vocalists which provides "a wide range of depth and variety that resembles Blood for Mercy more closely than their second album."

== Track listing ==
Tracklist adapted from the iTunes Store.

Standard version
No.	Title	Writer(s)	Producer(s)	Length
1.	"Lost On You" (featuring Phlake)	Nils Rondhuis; Jim Taihuttu; Jonathan Elkær Nielsen; Scott Effman; Thom van der Bruggen; Mads Bo Iversen; Valerie Broussard	Yellow Claw	3:20
2.	"Summertime" (featuring San Holo)	Rondhuis; Taihuttu; Sander van Dijck; van der Bruggen; Sophie Simmons	Yellow Claw; San Holo	3:42
3.	"Both of Us" (featuring Stori)	Rondhuis; Taihuttu; van der Bruggen; Tori Rae Diaz	Yellow Claw	3:18
4.	"Villain" (featuring Valentina)	Rondhuis; Taihuttu; van der Bruggen; Victoria Zaro; Valentina Cytrynowicz	Yellow Claw	2:58
5.	"Crash This Party" (featuring Tabitha Nauser)	Rondhuis; Taihuttu; van der Bruggen; Tori Rae Diaz; Daniel Stoltenhoff	Yellow Claw	2:29
6.	"Public Enemy" (with DJ Snake)	Rondhuis; Taihuttu; van der Bruggen; William Grigahcine	Yellow Claw; DJ Snake	3:45
7.	"Fake Chanel" (featuring ASAP Ferg and Creek Boyz)	Rondhuis; Taihuttu; van der Bruggen; Stoltenhoff; Devin Williams; Breland McArthur; Marcell Jones; Jarrett Jones; Chauncey Abrams; Darold D. Brown Ferguson	Yellow Claw	3:02
8.	"Attention" (featuring Chace and Kalibwoy)	Rondhuis; Taihuttu; van der Bruggen; Zhu Yihan; Natalio Richmond Rijssel	Yellow Claw; Chace	3:59
9.	"Bittersweet" (with Sofia Reyes)	Rondhuis; Taihuttu; van der Bruggen; Daecolm Diego Holland	Yellow Claw	2:48
10.	"To the Max" (featuring MC Kekel, Lil Debbie, Bok Nero and MC Gustta)	Rondhuis; Taihuttu; van der Bruggen; Jordan Capozzi; Bokeir R. Ross; Joris Titawano; Bryan Palm; Keldson Willian da Silva; Bruno Gustavo Sousa Santos	Yellow Claw	3:36
11.	"Down On Love" (featuring Moksi and Yade Lauren)	Rondhuis; Taihuttu; van der Bruggen; Diego Stijnen; Samir Ait Moh Nait Lhaj; Jade Clevers; Joris Titawano; Khristopher High Rickards	Yellow Claw; Moksi	3:08
12.	"I'll Be Fine" (featuring Kelsey Gill)	Rondhuis; Taihuttu; van der Bruggen; Diaz	Yellow Claw	2:30
13.	"Waiting" (featuring Rochelle)	Rondhuis; Taihuttu; van der Bruggen; Diaz	Yellow Claw	2:54
14.	"Another Life" (featuring Stori)	Rondhuis; Taihuttu; van der Bruggen; Diaz	Yellow Claw	3:17

== Charts ==
Chart (2018)	Peak position
Belgian Albums (Ultratop Flanders)	69
Belgian Albums (Ultratop Wallonia)	172
Dutch Albums (Album Top 100)	17
