= Blow Your Head: Diplo Presents Dubstep =

Remix album by Diplo
- Released: November 2, 2010
- Genre: Dubstep
- Length: 68:31
- Label: Mad Decent

Diplo chronology
Decent Work for Decent Pay (2009)	Blow Your Head: Diplo Presents Dubstep (2010)	Random White Dude Be Everywhere (2014)

Blow Your Head: Diplo Presents Dubstep is a DJ mix compilation album by American DJ and music producer Diplo. It was released on November 2, 2010 on Diplo's own label Mad Decent in the United States, and the following year as an import in the United Kingdom. It features multiple artists performing alongside Diplo, including Rusko, Benga, Zomby, Joker & Ginz, and James Blake, on some of the tracks.

== Critical reception ==
Blow Your Head received generally favorable reviews from critics. It has a rating of 67 out of 100 on Metacritic, indicating "generally favorable reviews," based on 9 critics' reviews.

Professional ratings
Aggregate scores
Source	Rating
Metacritic	67%
Review scores
Source	Rating
AllMusic	3.5/5 stars
PopMatters	(4/10)
Pitchfork Media	(6.5/10)

== Track listing ==
1. Re-Up (Joker & Ginz)
2. Hold The Line (Skream Remix) (Major Lazer featuring Mr. Lexx & Santigold)
3. Down (DZ)
4. U Don't Like Me (Datsik Remix) (Diplo featuring Lil Jon)
5. Strange Fruit (Zomby)
6. Glazed (Brackles)
7. Burn [Stenchman Remix] (Jessica Mauboy)
8. Sweet Shop (Doctor P)
9. Cockney Thug (Caspa Remix) (Rusko)
10. Stop What You're Doing (James Blake Remix) (Untold)
11. Sunset (Borgore featuring Diplo)
12. Sparing the Horse (James Blake)
13. 26 Basslines (Benga)
14. Youth Blood (12th Planet & Flinch Remix) (Little Jinder)
15. Resealable Friendship [Starkey Remix] (Rudi Zygadlo)
16. Hold On (Sub Focus Remix) (Rusko featuring Amber Coffman)
