= Till It Hurts =

Single by Yellow Claw featuring Ayden
- Released: 24 November 2014
- Genre: Trap; hip hop
- Length: 3:08
- Label: Spinnin'
- Songwriters: Brahim Fouradi; David Quiñones; Nils Rondhuis; Jim Taihuttu; Leo Roelandschap; Max Oude Weernink; Joris Titawano
- Producer: Yellow Claw

Yellow Claw singles chronology
"Shotgun" (2013)	"Till It Hurts" (2014)	"Run Away" (2015)

Ayden singles chronology
"Till It Hurts" (2014)

Music video
- "Till It Hurts" music video on YouTube

"Till It Hurts" is a song by Dutch electronic trio Yellow Claw, featuring vocals performed by Dutch singer Ayden (stage name of Sanne Veerbeek). It was released digitally as a single in November 2014 through Spinnin' Records.

"Till It Hurts" follows up on the success of their 2013 hit "Shotgun", peaking at number five in the Netherlands.

== Charts ==
=== Weekly charts ===
Chart (2014–15)	Peak position
Belgium (Ultratop 50 Flanders)	23
Belgium Dance (Ultratop Flanders)	12
Netherlands (Dutch Top 40)	7
Netherlands (Mega Top 50)	10
Netherlands (Single Top 100)	5
US Hot Dance/Electronic Songs (Billboard)	31

=== Year-end charts ===
Chart (2015)	Position
Netherlands (Dutch Top 40)	64
Netherlands (Single Top 100)	51
US Hot Dance/Electronic Songs (Billboard)	85
