= Cesqeaux =

Dutch record producer and DJ (born 1993)

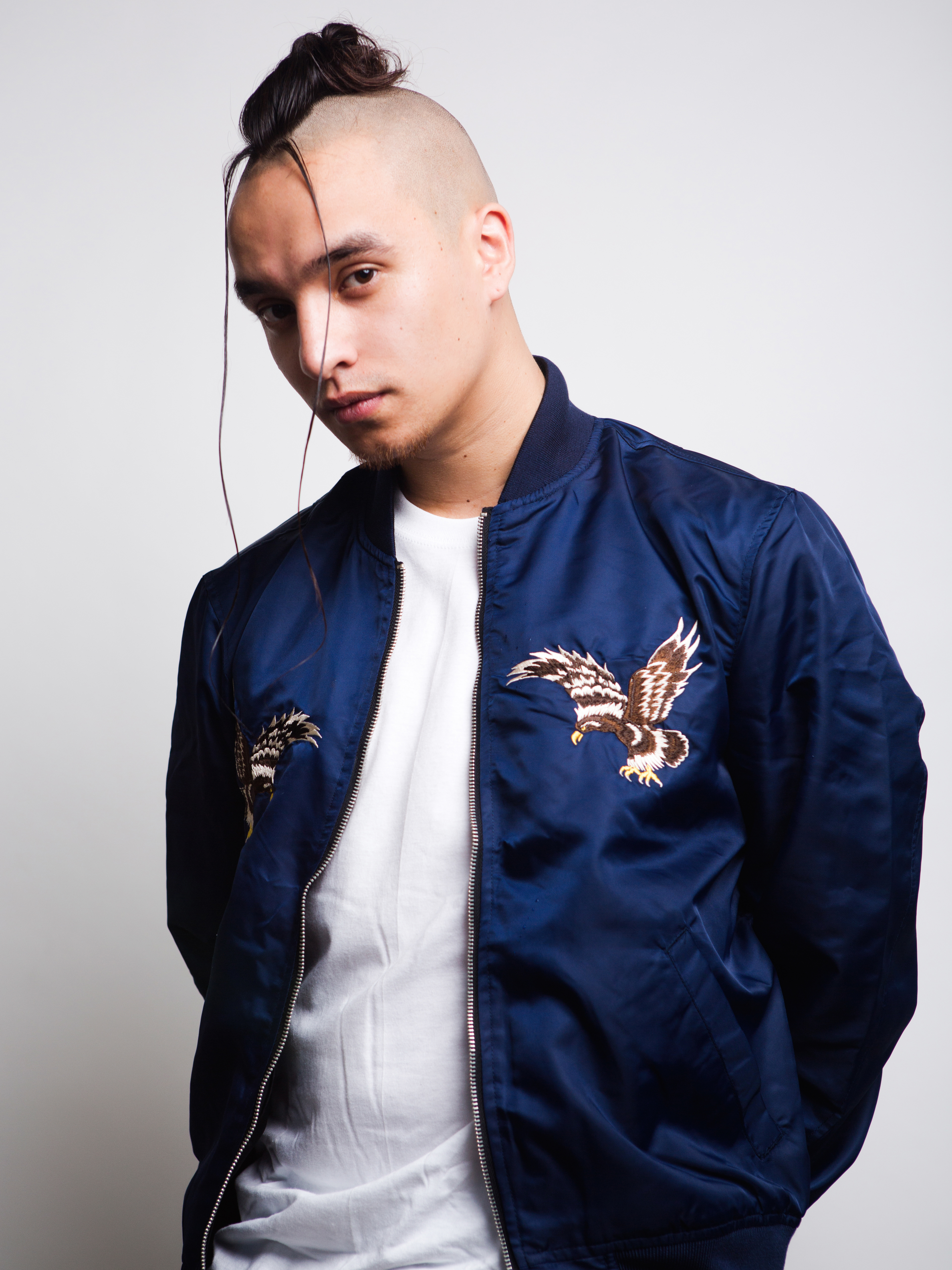

Background information
- Born: Daniël Francesco Tuparia; 24 July 1993 (age 33); Delfzijl, Groningen, Netherlands
- Genres: EDM; trap
- Occupations: Musician; DJ; record producer
- Labels: Interscope Records, Mixmash Records, Dim Mak Records, Mad Decent
- Website: cesqeaux.com

Daniël Francesco Tuparia (born 24 July 1993), better known by his stage name Cesqeaux (/ˈsɛskoʊ/ SESS-koh), is a Dutch record producer and DJ.

Cesqeaux has released original tracks, but has been featured in tracks on Dim Mak Records, Mixmash Records, Max Records, Mad Decent, Interscope Records, and more.

He has collaborated with other DJs including; David Guetta, Afrojack, Mike Cervello, Wiwek, LNY TNZ, Mightyfools, Kayzo, San Holo, Curbi and more.

Cesqeaux has performed at music festivals such as Tomorrowland Brazil, Tomorrowland Belgium, and Dance Valley, and has been featured on the biggest talk show in the Netherlands, De Wereld Draait Door (also known as DWDD.)

DJ Laidback Luke stated about Cesqeaux that "He has showmanship, he has passion, he has looks, he has the voice—he's going to be big."

== Biography ==
=== Early life ===
Tuparia was born in Delfzijl, Netherlands. His father was a guitarist, and his mother was a music enthusiast, so he was exposed to music from a very young age. He began playing the drums at age 7. Tuparia has stated that he is of Moluccan descent.

Tuparia attended the Academy for Pop Culture in Holland to study for his bachelor's degree. During this time, he attended a Yellow Claw concert and met with the DJs after the show, where he was asked to send them some of his music.

=== Music career ===
In 2012, Cesqeaux began collaborating with Yellow Claw. Additionally, he performed a supporting act for Diplo in Las Vegas, Nevada. He received airtime on BBC1Xtra and his remix of Putchabackinit by DJ Sliink was featured on 22tracks.

In 2013, Cesqeaux performed in the Dance Valley and Fusion of Dance music festivals.

His remix of The Dopest by Moksi was listed the 8th best trap song of 2015 by runthetrap.

In 2016, Major Lazer released its official Peace is the Mission Remixes album, featuring a remix by Cesqeaux of Night Riders (featuring Travi$ Scott, Pusha T, 2 Chainz and Mad Cobra.) His music was also featured in sets at the Ultra Music Festival in Miami. Additionally, he performed at Tomorrowland Brazil, Tomorrowland Belgium, Mysteryland and Parookaville music festivals.

In June 2017 he co-produced "2U" in collaboration with David Guetta, Giorgio Tuinfort and Justin Bieber.

== Discography ==
=== Extended plays ===
Title	Details
Human Error	Released: 6 August 2021; Label: Eauxmygod; Formats: Digital download

=== Singles ===
Year	Title	Album	Label
2015	"Wylin"	EAUXMYGOD EP	Barong Family
2015	"Altercation"	EAUXMYGOD EP	Barong Family
2015	"Nightwatch"	EAUXMYGOD EP	Barong Family
2015	"Grenades"	EAUXMYGOD EP	Barong Family
2015	"Twist" (with Wiwek)	EAUXMYGOD EP VOL. 2	Barong Family
2015	"Wylin, Pt. 2"	EAUXMYGOD EP VOL. 2	Barong Family
2015	"Colossal"	EAUXMYGOD EP VOL. 2	Barong Family
2015	"Shaman"	EAUXMYGOD EP VOL. 2	Barong Family
2016	"Home" (with Kayzo)	EAUXMYGOD EP VOL. 3	Barong Family
2016	"Who Am I" (with San Holo)	EAUXMYGOD EP VOL. 3	Barong Family
2016	"Murder" (with Mightyfools)	EAUXMYGOD EP VOL. 3	Barong Family
2016	"Wylin, Pt. 3"	EAUXMYGOD EP VOL. 3	Barong Family
2016	"P.S.A." (with The Galaxy)	Barong Family Album	Barong Family
2016	"Work It" (with Chace)	Barong Family Album	Barong Family
2017	"Back Up"	The Infamous EP	Mad Decent
2017	"Together" (with Aazar)	The Infamous EP	Mad Decent
2017	"The Strongest"	The Infamous EP	Mad Decent
2017	"Where My Money At" (with Mike Cervello and Snavs)	The Infamous EP	Mad Decent
2017	"Private Time" (with Sophie Simmons)	Non-album single	Barong Family
2018	"Time Bomb"	Non-album single	Barong Family
2018	"Bust" (with DJ Sliink)	Non-album single	Barong Family
2019	"Losing Myself" (with Ben & Fil and Perk Pietrek)	XXX EP	Stmpd Rcrds
2019	"Amsterdam"	XXX EP	Stmpd Rcrds
2020	"Bang Bang" (with Riot Ten)	Non-album single	Bassrush Records
2023	"Give It To Me" (with Tisoki)	Non-album single	NoCopyrightSounds

=== As accompanying artist ===
Year	Title	Album	Label	Peak chart positions			
Year	Title	Album	Label	NLD	NLD Dance	NLD Single Top	US
2012	"Make it Clap" (Yellow Claw and Cesqeaux)	Non-album single		—	—	—	—
2014	"Inma Head" (Yellow Claw and Cesqeaux featuring Marlishh)	Legends EP	Dim Mak Records	—	—	—	—
2014	"Legends" (Yellow Claw and Cesqeaux featuring Kalibwoy)	Legends EP	Dim Mak Records	—	—	—	—
2014	"Preacher" (Yellow Claw and Cesqeaux featuring Roendy)	Legends EP	Dim Mak Records	—	—	—	—
2014	"IBETCHU" (Yellow Claw and Cesqeaux)	Legends EP	Dim Mak Records	—	—	—	—
2015	"Wild Mustang" (Yellow Claw and Cesqeaux featuring Becky G)	Blood for Mercy	Mad Decent	64	17	4	187
2017	"Life Good" (Afrojack and Cesqeaux featuring O.T. Genasis)	Non-album single	Wall Recordings	—	—	—	—
2017	"Blow Up In Ya Face" (Quintino and Cesqeaux)	Go Harder, Pt 3: Do Or Die	Spinnin' Records	—	—	—	—
2017	"Wickedest Wine" (Menasa and Cesqeaux)	Otrabanada EP	Barong Family	—	—	—	—
2017	"Tur Hende Hisa Man" (Menasa and Cesqeaux)	Otrabanada EP	Barong Family	—	—	—	—
2017	"Bombaclat" (Menasa and Cesqeaux)	Otrabanada EP	Barong Family	—	—	—	—
2017	"Bacalao" (Menasa and Cesqeaux)	Otrabanada EP	Barong Family	—	—	—	—
2017	"You Already Know" (Stoltenhoff and Cesqeaux)	The Prodigy EP	Barong Family	—	—	—	—
2018	"Wrong Thing" (Cesqeaux featuring Tsunano)	Shanghai Nights, Pt. 1	Barong Family	—	—	—	—
2018	"Shake It" (Cesqeaux and LNY TNZ featuring Lil Debbie)	Shanghai Nights, Pt. 1	Barong Family	—	—	—	—
"—" denotes a recording that did not chart or was not released.

=== As featured artist ===
Year	Title	Album	Label
2013	"Ritual" (Wiwek featuring Cesqeaux)	Non-album singles	Mixmash Records
2014	"Psycho" (Yellow Claw, Martin Garrix and Cesqeaux)	Non-album singles	Self-released
2015	"Smack!" (Mike Cervello featuring Cesqeaux)	Smack EP	Barong Family
2017	"Stacks" (Yellow Claw featuring Quavo, Tinie Tempah and Cesqeaux)	Los Amsterdam	Mad Decent
2017	"Booty Time" (Aazar featuring Cesqeaux)	Non-album single	Barong Family

Co-productions

2017

• David Guetta - 2u (featuring Justin Bieber)

2023

• Diplo & Lil Yachty - Humble

2023

• David Guetta & Zara Larsson - On My Love

=== Remixes ===
2014

- Gianni Marino and Jurab – Wayaki (Cesqeaux Remix)
- Trey Songz – Na Na (Cesqeaux Remix)

2015

- Mike Cervello and Stoltenhoff – Guerilla (Cesqeaux Remix)
- Moksi – The Dopest (Cesqeaux Remix)
- Gregor Salto and Wiwek – On Your Mark (Cesqeaux Remix)
- Selena Gomez and A$AP Rocky – Good for You (Yellow Claw and Cesqeaux Remix)

2016

- San Holo – Still Looking (Cesqeaux Remix)
- Trolley Snatcha and Modestep – Sing (Yellow Claw and Cesqeaux Remix)
- DJ Snake and Yellow Claw – Ocho Cinco (Cesqeaux Remix)
- Major Lazer – Night Riders (Cesqeaux Remix)
- Yellow Claw – Higher (Cesqeaux Remix)
- Laidback Luke, GTA and Aruna – The Chase (Mike Cervello and Cesqeaux Remix)

2018

- Martin Garrix featuring Khalid – "Ocean" (Martin Garrix and Cesqeaux Remix)

2020

- David Guetta and Sia - Let's Love (Cesqeaux Remix)
