= Enemy of the State =

Enemy of the state is a political / criminal term.

Enemy of the State may also refer to:

- Enemy of the State (film), a 1998 spy-thriller film directed by Tony Scott
- Enemy of the State (album), a 2000 album by C-Bo
- Enemy of the State: A Love Story, a mixtape by Lupe Fiasco
- "Enemy of the State" (Homeland), a 2018 television episode
- "Enemy of the State" (L.A.'s Finest), a 2019 television episode
- "Enemy of the State" (Scandal), a 2012 television episode
- An Enemy of the State, a 1965 British television series

== See also ==
- Enema of the State, a 1999 studio album by Blink-182
- Enemy of the people (disambiguation)
- Public enemy (disambiguation)
