= Rochelle Perts =

Dutch singer

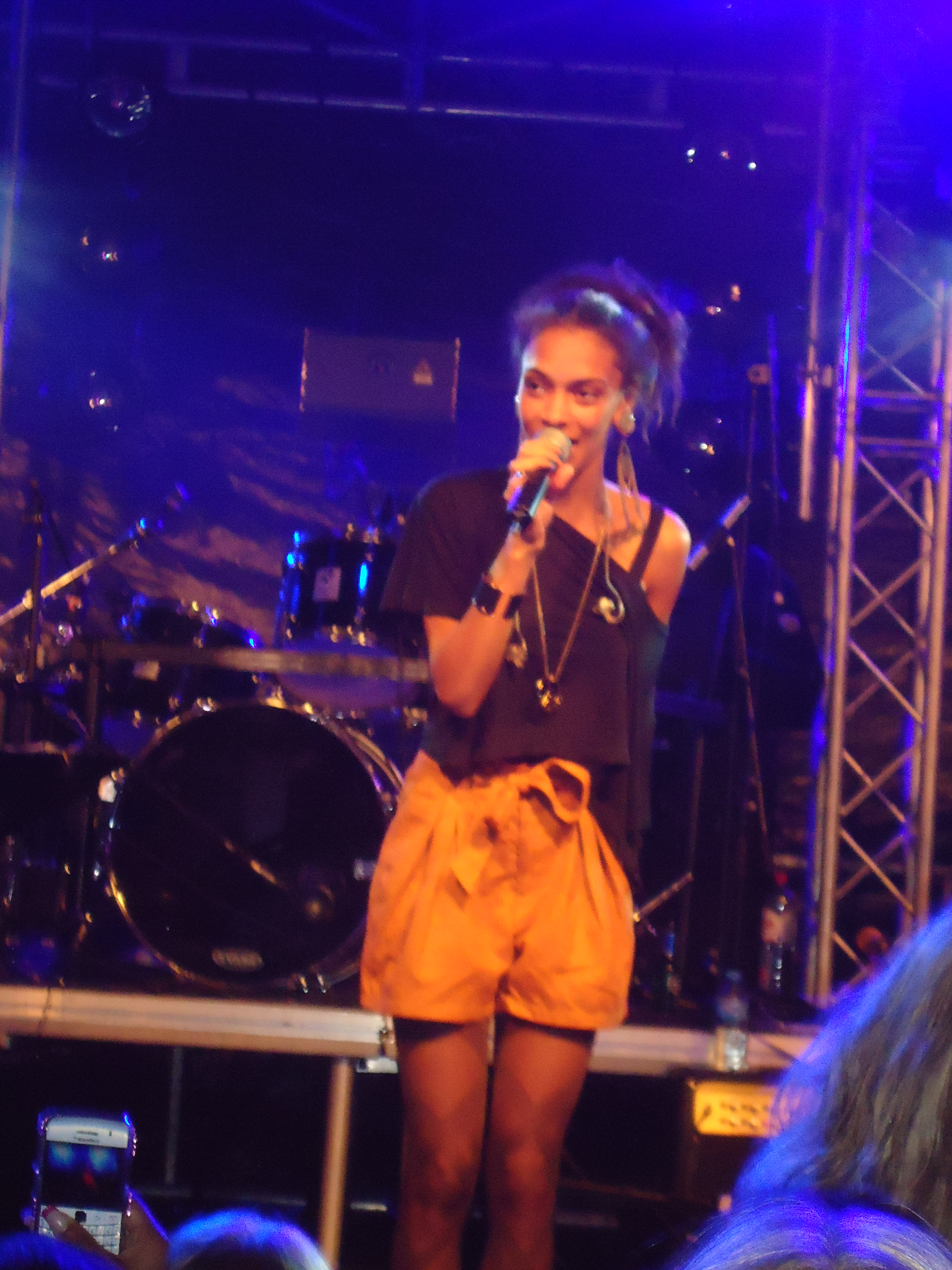

Background information
- Born: Rochelle Perts; 20 March 1992 (age 34); Helmond, Netherlands
- Genres: Pop; R&B
- Occupation: Singer
- Instrument: Vocals
- Years active: 2011—present
- Website: rochelle-perts.com

Rochelle Perts (born 20 March 1992), better known by her stage name Rochelle, is a Surinamese-Dutch singer who rose to prominence after winning the fourth season of talent show X Factor on 10 June 2011.

== X Factor ==
Perts won the fourth season of the Dutch version of the talent show X Factor on 10 June 2011. She was coached on the show by Eric van Tijn and received 73% of the votes in the final.

== Discography ==
List of studio albums, with selected chart positions and details
| Title | Details | Peak chart positions |
| Title | Details | NLD |
|---|---|---|
| You vs. Me | Released: 2 April 2012; Label: Sony; Formats: CD, digital download | 11 |
| #Clubvibes | Released: 24 September 2018; Label: Young Elephants; Formats: digital download | — |

=== EPs ===
| Title | Details |
|---|---|
| Centerpiece | Released: 2 February 2018; Label: Young Elephants; Formats: CD, digital download |

=== Singles ===
==== As lead artist ====
List of singles, with selected peak chart positions
| Title | Year | Peak chart positions | Album or EP |
| Title | Year | NLD | Album or EP |
|---|---|---|---|
| "No Air" | 2011 | 1 | Non-album singles |
| "Strong" | 2011 | 6 | Non-album singles |
| "What a Life" | 2012 | 47 | You vs. Me |
| "Untouchable" | 2012 | 58 | You vs. Me |
| "All Night Long" | 2016 | 24 | #Clubvibes |
| "Way Up" (featuring Kalibwoy) | 2016 | 36 | #Clubvibes |
| "Don't Let Me Go" | 2017 | 57 | #Clubvibes |
| "You Got Something" | 2017 | 54 | #Clubvibes |
| "Come To Me" (with Sharon Doorson featuring Rollàn) | 2017 | 57 | #Clubvibes |
| "This Christmas (I Promise)" | 2017 | — | Non-album single |
| "All Good" (with Amy Miyu) | 2018 | — | #Clubvibes |
| "Control" (with OIJ) | 2018 | — | Non-album single |
| "2Shots" | 2018 | — | #Clubvibes (Note: While the original versions of "Centerpiece", "Come & Get It" and "Make It Better" are present on the "Centerpiece" EP; only remixes of these songs are a part of the #ClubVibes album.) |
| "Centerpiece" | 2018 | — | #Clubvibes |
| "Come & Get It" | 2018 | — | #Clubvibes |
| "Make It Better" | 2018 | — | #Clubvibes |
| "Mami" | 2020 | — | Non-album singles |
| "Ocean" | 2022 | — | Non-album singles |
"—" denotes a recording that did not chart or was not released in that territory.

==== As featured artist ====
| Year | Single | Peak chart positions | | Album |
| Year | Single | NL | BE | Album |
|---|---|---|---|---|
| 2011 | "Body Language (Ride)" (The Partysquad featuring Rochelle and Jayh) | 91 | — | Non-album singles |
| 2013 | "Shotgun" (Yellow Claw featuring Rochelle) | 9 | 20 | Non-album singles |
| 2014 | "Into the Madness" (Coone featuring Rochelle) | — | — | Non-album singles |
| 2015 | "Return of the Mack" (Lady Bee featuring Rochelle) | — | 82 | Non-album singles |
| 2015 | "Fools Paradise" (Dirtcaps featuring Rochelle) | 41 | — | Non-album singles |
| 2016 | "Breaking Walls" (Sandro Silva featuring Rochelle) | — | — | Non-album singles |
| 2017 | "Light Years" (Yellow Claw featuring Rochelle) | — | — | Los Amsterdam |
| 2018 | "Dreams" (DOLF and Weird Genius featuring Rochelle) | — | — | Non-album single |
| 2019 | "Lightning" (Lady Bee featuring Rochelle) | — | — | Non-album single |

== Notes ==
| Preceded by Jaap van Reesema | Winner of X Factor (Netherlands); 2011 | Succeeded by Haris Alagic |
