= Boy Oh Boy (Diplo and GTA song) =

Single by Diplo and GTA

from the album Random White Dude Be Everywhere
- Released: October 7, 2013
- Genre: Big room house; moombahton; trap
- Length: 2:54 - 4:22 (original mix)
- Label: Mad Decent
- Songwriters: Julio Mejia; Matthew Van Toth; Thomas Wesley Pentz
- Producers: Julio Mejia; Matthew Van Toth; Thomas Wesley Pentz

Diplo singles chronology
"Earthquake" (2013)	"Boy Oh Boy" (2013)	"Crown" (2013)

GTA singles chronology
"The Crowd" (2013)	"Boy Oh Boy" (2013)	"Bola" (2013)

Music video
- "Boy Oh Boy" on YouTube

"Boy Oh Boy" is a song by American DJ and record producer Diplo and EDM duo GTA. It was released on October 7, 2013, via Mad Decent. The song was from Diplo's compilation album Random White Dude Be Everywhere.

== Composition ==
The song uses a sample from "Work it" (2002) by Missy Elliott, and it is written in the key of C♯ Minor, with a tempo of 130 beats per minute.

== Music video ==
The music video was released on March 26, 2014, and it was made with the help of fans, showed many vines like: "flamboyant dancing, dogs DJing, sports fails, and of course, an abundance of twerking."

== Charts ==
=== Weekly charts ===
Chart (2013)	Peak position
Scotland Singles (Official Charts)	30
UK Singles (Official Charts)	52
US Hot Dance/Electronic Songs (Billboard)	19

=== Year-end charts ===
Chart (2013)	Position
US Hot Dance/Electronic Songs (Billboard)	94
Chart (2014)	Position
US Hot Dance/Electronic Songs (Billboard)	71
