= Decent Work for Decent Pay =

Remix album by Diplo
- Released: January 26, 2009
- Genre: Dance, electronic
- Length: 60:23
- Label: Big Dada
- Producer: Diplo

Diplo chronology
| Top Ranking: A Diplo Dub (2008) | Decent Work for Decent Pay (2009) | Blow Your Head: Diplo Presents Dubstep (2010) |

Professional ratings
Aggregate scores
| Source | Rating |
|---|---|
| Metacritic | 60/100 |
Review scores
| Source | Rating |
| AllMusic | 4/5 stars |
| The A.V. Club | B− |
| BBC Music | mixed |
| Drowned in Sound | 5/10 |
| The Guardian | unfavorable |
| MusicOMH | 4/5 stars |
| Pitchfork | 5.2/10 |
| PopMatters | 5/10 stars |
| Rolling Stone | 3.5/5 stars |

Decent Work for Decent Pay is a DJ mix compilation album by Diplo. It was released on Big Dada on January 26, 2009.

== Critical reception ==
At Metacritic, which assigns a weighted average score out of 100 to reviews from mainstream critics, Decent Work for Decent Pay received an average score of 60% based on 10 reviews, indicating "mixed or average reviews".

C. T. Heaney of PopMatters gave the album 5 stars out of 10, saying, "it goes in so many different directions (some expertly, some unimpressively) that it's hard to tell what, exactly, Diplo is trying to accomplish by putting it all here in one place."

== Track listing ==
| No. | Title | Artist(s) | Length |
|---|---|---|---|
| 1. | "Newsflash" (featuring Sandra Melody) | Diplo | 3:07 |
| 2. | "Paper Planes (Diplo Remix)" (featuring Bun B and Rich Boy) | M.I.A. | 3:26 |
| 3. | "Put That Pussy on Me (Diplo Tonite Remix)" | Spank Rock | 3:45 |
| 4. | "Reload It" | Kano | 3:49 |
| 5. | "200" | Diplo | 2:27 |
| 6. | "Where Is Home? (Diplo Remix)" | Bloc Party | 6:25 |
| 7. | "Let's Make Love and Listen to Death from Above (Diplo Remix)" | CSS | 4:18 |
| 8. | "Solta o Frango" | Bonde do Rolê | 2:18 |
| 9. | "Heater (Diplo Extended Edit)" | Samim | 4:33 |
| 10. | "Shake a Fist (Diplo Remix)" | Hot Chip | 4:07 |
| 11. | "Way More Brazil" | Diplo | 3:22 |
| 12. | "Veni Vidi Vici (Diplo Remix)" | Black Lips | 3:44 |
| 13. | "The Whistler (Diplo Remix)" | Claude VonStroke | 4:19 |
| 14. | "Smash a Kangaroo" | Diplo | 3:29 |
| 15. | "Young Folks (Diplo Youngest Folks Remix)" | Peter Bjorn and John | 6:10 |

== Charts ==
| Chart | Peak position |
|---|---|
| US Top Dance/Electronic Albums (Billboard) | 23 |
