= Blood for Mercy =

Studio album by Yellow Claw
- Released: 20 November 2015
- Label: Mad Decent

Yellow Claw chronology
Blood for Mercy (2015)	Los Amsterdam (2017)

Blood for Mercy is the first studio album by Dutch electronic music ensemble Yellow Claw.

== Track listing ==
- Roller (featuring Eyelar)
- Higher (featuring Lil Eddie)
- For the Thrill (featuring Becky G)
- Nightmare (featuring Pusha T & Barrington Levy)
- In My Room (with Mustard featuring Ty Dolla $ign & Tyga)
- Lifetime (featuring Kyler England & Tiësto)
- Catch Me (with Flux Pavilion featuring Naaz)
- We Made It (featuring Lil Eddie)
- Feel It (featuring Naaz)
- Drowning in Champagne (featuring Maty Noyes)
- Blood Diamond (featuring Serebro)
- Sin City
- Bun It Up (featuring Beenie Man)
- Wild Mustang (with Cesqeaux featuring Becky G)
- Ride or Die (with Dirtcaps featuring Kalibwoy)
- Kaolo, Pt. 3

Remix album

- Roller (featuring Eyelar) [The Galaxy Remix]
- Higher (featuring Lil Eddie) [Cesqeaux Remix]
- For the Thrill (featuring Becky G) [LNY TNZ Remix]
- Nightmare (featuring Pusha T & Barrington Levy) [Ape Drums Remix]
- In My Room (with DJ Mustard featuring Ty Dolla $ign & Tyga) [Midas Hutch Remix]
- Lifetime (featuring Kyler England & Tiësto) [Victor Niglio Remix]
- Catch Me (with Flux Pavilion featuring Naaz) [Candlelight Remix]
- We Made It (featuring Lil Eddie) [Snavs Remix]
- Feel It (featuring Naaz) [Moksi Remix]
- Drowning in Champagne (featuring Maty Noyes) [Chace Remix]
- Blood Diamond (featuring Serebro) [Zeskullz Remix]
- Sin City [Rain Man Remix]
- Bun It Up (featuring Beenie Man) [Moth Circuit Remix]
- Wild Mustang (with Cesqeaux featuring Becky G) [Mike Cervello Remix]
- Ride or Die (with Dirtcaps featuring Kalibwoy) [Modestep Remix]
- Kaolo, Pt. 3 [Mightyfools Remix]
- In My Room (with DJ Mustard featuring Ty Dolla $ign & Tyga) San Holo Remix]

== Chart history ==
Chart (2015)	Peak position
Belgium (Ultratop	48
Netherlands (MegaCharts)	27
US Billboard 200	187
US Dance/Electronic Albums (Billboard)	1
