= 2U (David Guetta song) =

Single by David Guetta featuring Justin Bieber

from the album 7
- Released: 9 June 2017
- Genre: EDM; future bass
- Length: 3:14
- Label: What a Music
- Songwriters: David Guetta; Giorgio Tuinfort; Jason "Poo Bear" Boyd; Daniel "Cesqeaux" Tuparia; Justin Bieber
- Producers: David Guetta; Giorgio Tuinfort

David Guetta singles chronology
"Another Life" (2017)	"2U" (2017)	"Versace on the Floor" (remix) (2017)

Justin Bieber singles chronology
"I'm the One" (2017)	"2U" (2017)	"Friends" (2017)

Music video
- "2U" on YouTube

"2U" is a song by French DJ and record producer David Guetta, featuring vocals from Canadian singer Justin Bieber. The song has EDM elements. It was written by Justin Bieber, Poo Bear, Cesqeaux and its producer Guetta and Giorgio Tuinfort. It was released on 9 June 2017 by What a Music, as the lead single from Guetta's seventh studio album, 7 (2018).

== Background ==
"2U" is the third collaborative single for Bieber in 2017 following "I'm the One" and "Despacito", both of which topped the US Billboard Hot 100 and other national charts.

A thirteen-second teaser was revealed by Victoria's Secret's models Elsa Hosk, Jasmine Tookes, Romee Strijd and Sara Sampaio. The cover art was revealed by Guetta on 8 June 2017. Guetta told MTV that the song was "just very romantic".

== Music video ==
Guetta announced that there would be two music videos for the single; the Victoria's Secret version and another version which he calls "not branded". The first version features Victoria's Secret models Sara Sampaio, Romee Strijd, Elsa Hosk, Jasmine Tookes, Stella Maxwell and Martha Hunt lip-syncing the song while on-set of a photo shoot for the lingerie brand. The second music video was released on September 29, 2017 on YouTube.

== Track listing ==
- Digital download
1. "2U" – 3:15
- Digital download – Robin Schulz remix
1. "2U" (Robin Schulz remix) – 5:21
- Digital download – GLOWINTHEDARK remix
1. "2U" (GLOWINTHEDARK remix) – 3:30
- Digital download – MORTEN remix
1. "2U" (MORTEN remix) – 3:49
- Digital download – Afrojack remix
1. "2U" (Afrojack remix) – 4:24
- Digital download – R3hab remix
1. "2U" (R3hab remix) – 2:36
- Digital download – FRNDS remix
1. "2U" (FRNDS remix) – 3:09
- Digital download – Seeb remix
1. "2U" (Seeb remix) – 3:34

== Credits and personnel ==
Credits adapted from Tidal.

- David Guetta – songwriting, producer
- Justin Bieber – songwriting
- Jason "Poo Bear" Boyd – songwriting, vocal production
- Giorgio Tuinfort – songwriting, producer, pianist
- Daniel "Cesqeaux" Tuparia – additional producer and programming
- Daddy's Groove – mastering engineer, mixer
- Henry Sarmiento III – engineer
- Chris "TEK" O'Ryan – vocoder, recorder
- The Pianoman – talk box
- Monsieur Georges – talk box
- Josh Gudwin – recorder

== Charts ==
=== Weekly charts ===
Chart (2017)	Peak position
Argentina (Monitor Latino)	12
Australia (ARIA)	2
Australia Dance (ARIA)	1
Austria (Ö3 Austria Top 40)	2
Belgium (Ultratop 50 Flanders)	3
Belgium Dance (Ultratop Flanders)	4
Belgium (Ultratop 50 Wallonia)	8
Belgium Dance (Ultratop Wallonia)	6
Bulgaria (PROPHON)	3
Canada Hot 100 (Billboard)	4
Canada CHR/Top 40 (Billboard)	22
Canada Hot AC (Billboard)	33
Chile Anglo (Monitor Latino)	15
Colombia (National-Report)	43
Czech Republic Airplay (ČNS IFPI)	7
Czech Republic Singles Digital (ČNS IFPI)	2
Denmark (Tracklisten)	2
Ecuador Anglo (Monitor Latino)	5
Finland (Suomen virallinen lista)	3
France (SNEP)	10
Germany (GfK)	3
Germany Dance (Official German Charts)	2
Hungary (Dance Top 40)	13
Hungary (Rádiós Top 40)	4
Hungary (Single Top 40)	3
Hungary (Stream Top 40)	2
Ireland (IRMA)	5
Israel International Airplay (Media Forest)	6
Italy (FIMI)	9
Japan Hot 100 (Billboard)	29
Lebanon (OLT20)	2
Malaysia (RIM)	3
Mexico (Billboard Mexican Airplay)	14
Mexico Streaming (AMPROFON)	19
Netherlands (Dutch Top 40)	2
Netherlands (Mega Top 50)	4
Netherlands (Single Top 100)	5
Netherlands (Dutch Dance Top 30)	1
New Zealand (Recorded Music NZ)	4
Norway (VG-lista)	2
Panama (Monitor Latino)	13
Paraguay (Monitor Latino)	6
Philippines (Philippine Hot 100)	19
Poland Airplay (ZPAV)	11
Portugal (AFP)	2
Russia Airplay (Tophit)	13
Scottish Singles Sales (Official Charts)	4
Slovakia Airplay (ČNS IFPI)	29
Slovakia Singles Digital (ČNS IFPI)	3
Slovenia (SloTop50)	17
Spain (Promusicae)	13
Sweden (Sverigetopplistan)	2
Switzerland (Schweizer Hitparade)	2
UK Singles (Official Charts)	5
UK Dance (Official Charts)	1
US Billboard Hot 100	16
US Adult Pop Airplay (Billboard)	25
US Dance Club Songs (Billboard)	2
US Hot Dance/Electronic Songs (Billboard)	4
US Pop Airplay (Billboard)	15
US Rhythmic Airplay (Billboard)	19
Venezuela Anglo (Monitor Latino)	8

=== Year-end charts ===
Chart (2017)	Position
Argentina (Monitor Latino)	94
Australia (ARIA)	69
Austria (Ö3 Austria Top 40)	35
Belgium (Ultratop Flanders)	32
Belgium (Ultratop Wallonia)	28
Canada (Canadian Hot 100)	54
CIS (Tophit)	72
Denmark (Tracklisten)	30
France (SNEP)	65
Germany (Official German Charts)	46
Hungary (Dance Top 40)	45
Hungary (Rádiós Top 40)	38
Hungary (Single Top 40)	22
Hungary (Stream Top 40)	24
Italy (FIMI)	49
Netherlands (Dutch Top 40)	17
Netherlands (Single Top 100)	31
Poland (ZPAV)	75
Portugal (AFP)	29
Russia Airplay (Tophit)	76
Spain (PROMUSICAE)	53
Sweden (Sverigetopplistan)	31
Switzerland (Schweizer Hitparade)	51
UK Singles (Official Charts Company)	64
US Dance Club Songs (Billboard)	18
US Hot Dance/Electronic Songs (Billboard)	12

== Certifications ==
Region	Certification	Certified units/sales
Australia (ARIA)	3× Platinum	210,000^{‡}
Austria (IFPI Austria)	Gold	15,000^{‡}
Belgium (BRMA)	Platinum	20,000^{‡}
Canada (Music Canada)	2× Platinum	160,000^{‡}
Denmark (IFPI Danmark)	Platinum	90,000^{‡}
France (SNEP)	Diamond	333,333^{‡}
Germany (BVMI)	Platinum	400,000^{‡}
Italy (FIMI)	2× Platinum	100,000^{‡}
New Zealand (RMNZ)	2× Platinum	60,000^{‡}
Norway (IFPI Norway)	3× Platinum	180,000^{‡}
Poland (ZPAV)	2× Platinum	100,000^{‡}
Portugal (AFP)	Platinum	10,000^{‡}
Spain (Promusicae)	Platinum	40,000^{‡}
Switzerland (IFPI Switzerland)	Platinum	20,000^{‡}
United Kingdom (BPI)	Platinum	600,000^{‡}
United States (RIAA)	Platinum	1,000,000^{‡}
^{‡} Sales+streaming figures based on certification alone.

== Release history ==
Region	Date	Format	Version	Label	Ref.
Various	9 June 2017	Digital download	Original	What a Music	
Italy	9 June 2017	Contemporary hit radio	Original	Warner	
Various	14 July 2017	Digital download	Glowinthedark Remix	What a Music	
Various	14 July 2017	Digital download	Morten Remix	What a Music	
Various	14 July 2017	Digital download	Robin Schulz Remix	What a Music	
United Kingdom	21 July 2017	Contemporary hit radio	Original	Parlophone	
Various	28 July 2017	Digital download	Afrojack Remix	What a Music	
Various	4 August 2017	Digital download	R3hab Remix	What a Music	
Various	11 August 2017	Digital download	FRNDS Remix	What a Music	
