= Nicky da B =

American rapper

Nicky Da B
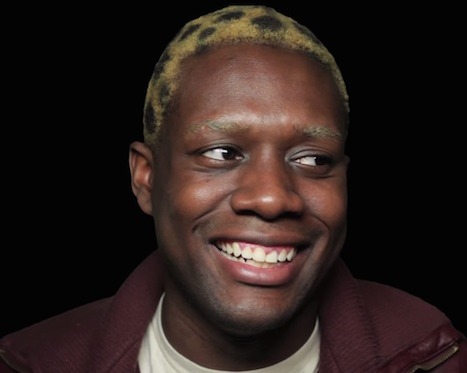

Background information
- Born: Nickesse Trimaine Toney; March 13, 1990; New Orleans, Louisiana, US
- Died: September 2, 2014 (aged 24)
- Genres: Bounce, hip hop
- Occupation: Rapper

Nickesse Trimaine Toney (March 13, 1990 – September 2, 2014), known by his stage name Nicky Da B, was an American rapper specializing in the regional genre of bounce music. He released an album in 2012 titled Please Don't Forget Da B, and his single with the artist Diplo that year, Express Yourself, was one of the year's largest viral successes, featuring in a Doritos commercial during Super Bowl XLVII. He was also known for his role in popularizing the dance phenomenon of twerking.

Nicky da B was born in 1990 in New Orleans, Louisiana in a section of the Carrollton neighborhood known as Pigeon Town, in the city's 17th ward. He was raised by his mother Nicole Toney and grandmother Aline Toney. Nicky graduated in 2008 from West Jefferson High School and attended Delgado Community College. Nicky began writing rap lyrics at age 6 under the name "Lil Fiya" in admiration of the Hot Boys. At 14, he began rapping himself. Nicky had close ties with Katey Red, who he called his "gay mother". Big Freedia was also a major influence and friend to Nicky Da B, and the two worked together to gain exposure for bounce music. Nicky was a former HHG (Hitt'em Hard Guy) and twerk dancer for Sissy Nobby before he branched out and became a solo artist. In 2011 he released the local hit "Drop It Hot Potato Style" and began touring. Nicky was outspoken about his passion for creating music for the LGBTQ community, which he identified with.

After releasing his album Please Don't Forget da B in 2012, he embarked on a world tour, which included a sold-out show at the Sydney Opera House. In July 2014, he collaborated with German dance-music duo Schlachthofbronx on the single, "Lights Off". On September 2, 2014, his death at age 24 due to illness was announced by his manager and live DJ, Rusty Lazer. The family later asked for help from fans in paying for his funeral, which included a parade led by the TBC Brass Band in his Carrollton neighborhood.

== Discography ==
=== Studio albums ===
- Please Don't Forget da B (2012)
