= Harderwijk, North Holland =

Harderwijk
- Hamlet
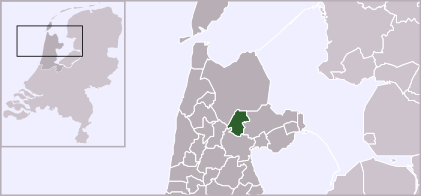

- Harderwijk in the municipality of Opmeer.
- Coordinates: 52°44′18″N 4°59′36″E
- Country: Netherlands
- Province: North Holland
- Municipality: Opmeer
- Time zone: UTC+1 (CET)
  - Summer (DST): UTC+2 (CEST)

Harderwijk is a hamlet in the northwestern Netherlands. It is located in the municipality of Opmeer, North Holland, about 11 km north of Hoorn.
