= Enemy of the people (disambiguation) =

Enemy of the people is a term used as a designation for the political or class opponents of the subgroup in power within a larger group.

Enemy of the people may also refer to:

- An Enemy of the People, an 1882 play by Henrik Ibsen
  - An Enemy of the People (1937 film), a 1937 German film directed by Hans Steinhoff
  - An Enemy of the People (1958 film), an Australian adaptation of the play
  - An Enemy of the People, a 1950 play by Arthur Miller, adapted from Ibsen's play
    - An Enemy of the People (1978 film), based on the play by Miller
  - An Enemy of the People (1990 film), UK release of Ganashatru, an Indian film
- Enemy of the People (book), by Adriaan Basson and Pieter du Toit, 2007
- Enemies of the People (film), a 2009 British/Cambodian documentary film
- "Enemies of the People" (headline), a controversial 2016 Daily Mail headline

== See also ==
- Public enemy (disambiguation)
- Enemy of the state (disambiguation)
