= Mightyfools =

Dutch music duo

- Origin: Amsterdam, Netherlands
- Genres: EDM; progressive house; electro house; bass house
- Instruments: Piano, guitar, synthesizer, vocals
- Years active: 2008–2018
- Labels: Wall; Fly Eye; DOORN; Revealed; Spinnin'; Barong Family
- Members: Jelle Keizer (2008-2018)
- Past members: Andy Samin (2008-2017)
- Website: mightyfools.com/

Mightyfools were a Dutch DJ, rapper and production duo formed in 2008, comprising Jelle Keizer and Andy Samin. The duo had three successful productions in 2013: "Footrocker", "Put Em Up" and "Go", respectively released through Revealed Recordings, DOORN Records and Wall Recordings. The project was discontinued in 2018, shortly after Andy Samin left the project in the winter of 2017 due to problems connected with depression. After the retirement, Keizer was appointed the A&R of Barong Family.

Keizer has continued his career as DJ and house producer under his own name since June 2018.

== Achievements ==
Mightyfools were supported by Laidback Luke, Don Diablo, Hardwell and Fedde Le Grand, the group occurred on major international festivals such as the Amsterdam Dance Event.

== Discography ==
=== Extended plays ===
List of extended plays
Title	Details
For the Family	Released: 27 November 2015; Label: Barong Family; Format: Digital download
Fools Squad Vol. 1	Released: 26 May 2016; Label: Spinnin' Premium; Format: Digital download
Fools Squad Vol. 2	Released: 26 August 2016; Label: Spinnin' Premium; Format: Digital download
Blood Brothers	Released: 2 December 2016; Label: Barong Family; Format: Digital download
The Legacy	Released: 27 July 2018; Label: Klash Records; Format: Digital download

=== Other EPs ===
- Feel Good EP (Dim Mak, 2013)
- The Legacy EP (Klash, 2018)

=== Singles ===
==== Charted singles ====
Year	Title	Peak chart positions												Album
Year	Title	NLD	AUS	AUT	BEL (Vl)	BEL (Wa)	FIN	FRA	GER	IRL	SWE	SWI	UK	Album
2010	"Devil's Marbles" (vs. Sharkslayer)	—	—	—	28^{[A]}	—	—	—	—	—	—	—	—	Non-album single
"—" denotes a recording that did not chart or was not released in that territory.

==== Other singles ====
- 2012: "Drum Fail" (with Jordy Dazz) [Hysteria Records]
- 2013: "Ladykiller" [Revealed Recordings]
- 2013: "Footrocker" [Revealed Recordings]
- 2013: "Put Em Up" [DOORN (Spinnin')]
- 2013: "Go" [Wall Recordings]
- 2014: "Pullover" (with Niels Van Gogh) [DOORN (Spinnin')]
- 2014: "Lick Dat"' (with Yellow Claw) [Barong Family]
- 2014: "Shaolin" [Fly Eye Records]
- 2015: "Garuda" [Spinnin' Records]
- 2015: "Shots Fired" (with Mike Hawkins) [Fly Eye Records]
- 2015: "No Class" (with Yellow Claw) [Barong Family]
- 2015: "Gangsta" [Spinnin' Premium]
- 2017: "Dansen" (with Bizzey) [Made in NL]
- 2017: "FLOW" (with SICK INDIVIDUALS) [Armada Music]
- 2018: "U Need To" [Hysteria Records]

As featured artists

- 2017: Afrojack featuring Mightyfools - "Keep It Low" [Wall Recordings]
