= Shotgun (Yellow Claw song) =

Single by Yellow Claw featuring Rochelle
- Released: 4 November 2013
- Genre: Trap; electro house; hip hop
- Length: 3:14
- Label: Spinnin'
- Songwriters: Kris Coutinho; Brahim Fouradi; Cimo Fränkel; Patrick Mettendaf; Max Oude Weernink; Robert Pronk; Jacob Streefkerk
- Producers: Yellow Claw & Boaz van de Beatz

Yellow Claw singles chronology
"Last Night Ever" (2013)	"Shotgun" (2013)	"Till It Hurts" (2014)

Rochelle singles chronology
"Body Language (Ride)" (2011)	"Shotgun" (2013)	"Into the Madness" (2014)

Music video
- "Shotgun" music video on YouTube

"Shotgun" is a song by Dutch electronic trio Yellow Claw, featuring vocals by Dutch singer Rochelle Perts (credited under her mononymous stage name Rochelle). It was released in November 2013 as a single through Spinnin' Records. It reached the top 10 in the Netherlands and the top 20 in Belgium.

The song received remixes by DJ Quintino and LNY TNZ on the Spinnin' Records sublabel SPRS.

== Charts ==
=== Weekly charts ===
Chart (2013–14)	Peak position
Belgium (Ultratop 50 Flanders)	20
Belgium Dance (Ultratop Flanders)	13
Belgium (Ultratip Bubbling Under Wallonia)	16
Belgium Dance (Ultratop Wallonia)	35
Netherlands (Dutch Top 40)	10
Netherlands (Mega Top 50)	12
Netherlands (Single Top 100)	9
Russia Airplay (TopHit)	10
Ukraine Airplay (TopHit)	40

=== Year-end charts ===
Chart (2013)	Position
Netherlands (Dutch Top 40)	84
Netherlands (Single Top 100)	67
Chart (2014)	Position
Belgium (Ultratop Flanders)	75
Netherlands (Dutch Top 40)	47
Netherlands (Single Top 100)	82
Russia Airplay (TopHit)	38
