= Dirtcaps =

Dutch DJ and Rapper

- Origin: Amsterdam, Netherlands
- Genres: Trap; bass; hardstyle
- Occupations: DJs; producers; rappers
- Instrument: Digital audio workstation
- Years active: 2012–2018
- Labels: Sony Music; Armada Music; Klash; Smash The House; Barong Family; Revealed
- Members: Max Oude Weernink; Danny Groenenboom; Tim Haakmeester

Dirtcaps were a Dutch DJ and rapper group consisting of Max Oude Weernink and Danny Groenenboom, based in Amsterdam. They are best known for their song "Foreign Tongues" which charted on the Belgian "Dance Bubbling Under" chart and for performing at festivals such as Tomorrowland, Tomorrowworld and Defqon.1.

== Career ==
=== Early beginnings ===
The duo, who were friends at a young age, began playing at local parties in their hometown, Haarlem. They are signed to Stars Agency, the same as Alvaro.

=== Musical style ===
Musically, Dirtcaps' style incorporates hardstyle, festival trap, big room house and subground. In 2016, they launched KLASH, a record label in collaboration with Armada Music until 2018. They released three extended plays, Hands Up in 2012, Boss It Up in 2014 and New Eastzane Warriors, which is a collaboration with Yellow Claws in 2015.

=== Releases ===
In 2012, they released the single "Money On My Mind", a collaboration with The Million Plan via Sony Music.

In 2014, they released the singles "How Many Dj's" with The Partysquad, "Dagga" with Alvaro via Smash The House, "World on Fire" with Raynor Bruges and "Stand Up" with The Oddword.

In 2015, they released the singles "Booty Down" with Raynor Bruges, "Brah" with Alvaro and "Fools Paradise" featuring Rochelle.

In 2016, they released "Foreign Tongues" as a single featuring Eleni Drake. The song peaked at 6th on the Dancing Bubbling Under chart in Belgium. They later released "Pun This" as a collaboration with FIGHT CLVB through Hardwell's record label Revealed Recordings, featuring Sanjin.

In 2017, they released "Midnight Sun" featuring RAPHAELLA as a single.

In 2018, they released their final compilation "10 Years Of Dirtcaps" before splitting up.

== Discography ==
=== Charting singles ===
Title	Year	Peak chart positions	
Title	Year	NL	BEL
"Money On My Mind" (with The Million Plan)	2012	54	—
"Weekend" (with FeestDJRuud featuring Sjaak and Kraantje Pappie)	2013	69	—
"Foreign Tongues" (featuring Eleni Drake)	2016	—	6

=== As featured ===
2014

- Alvaro – "Dagga" (featuring Dirtcaps)
- The Partysquad – "How Many Dj's" (featuring Dirtcaps)

2015

- Yellow Claw and Alvaro – "Flags Up" (featuring Dirtcaps)
- Yellow Claw – "Ravolution" (featuring Dirtcaps)
- Yellow Claw – "Smoke It" (featuring Dirtcaps)
- Yellow Claw – "Burn It Bro" (featuring Dirtcaps and Jay Cosmic)
- Laidback Luke and Yellow Claw – "Mic" (featuring Dirtcaps)

=== Remixes ===
2012

- Johan Wedel and Dev – Dancing in the Dark (Dirtcaps Remix)

2013

- In The Valley Below – Peaches (Dirtcaps Remix)
- Lana Del Rey – Summertime Madness (Dirtcaps Remix)

2015

- Hardwell and W&W featuring Fatman Scoop – Don't Stop The Madness (Dirtcaps Remix)
- Netsky – Rio (Dirtcaps Remix)
