= Good Times Ahead =

Electronic music duo

- Also known as: GTA
- Origin: Miami, Florida, United States
- Genres: House; electro house; hip hop; trap; dubstep
- Instruments: Keyboard, guitar, synthesizer
- Years active: 2010–present
- Labels: Warner Bros., Spinnin' Deep, Musical Freedom, Fly Eye, MixMash, Fool's Gold, SIZE, Mad Decent, Owsla, Monstercat
- Members: Matthew Van Toth (Van Toth); Julio Mejia (JWLS)
- Website: wearegta.com/

Good Times Ahead (formerly GTA) is an electronic music duo from Miami consisting of house, electro house, trap and hip hop producers Julio Mejia (born December 8, 1990) and Matt Toth (born August 22, 1990). After releasing music with the support of Laidback Luke in 2011, the duo caught the attention of Diplo, who featured them on his 2012 "Express Yourself" which was written by their cousin Joel Santillan. GTA has released music on labels such as Warner Bros., A-Trak's Fool's Gold, Laidback Luke's MixMash, Steve Angello's SIZE, Diplo's Mad Decent and more. They've toured the globe with Rihanna on her 2013 Diamonds World Tour, with Calvin Harris and Tiësto on their Greater Than World Tour, and have headlined their own Death To Genres Tour and Goons Take America Tours.

Beyond their partnership as GTA, Julio and Matt have each produced music individually. Under solo aliases known as JWLS and Van Toth, respectively, both have released original productions and remixes. Julio's individual work as JWLS, includes remixes for A-Trak, Danny Brown and others. Matt's solo work as Van Toth includes remixes for Gina Turner.

In August 2019, they officially changed their group name from the previous GTA acroymn to its full length, Good Times Ahead.

== Early life ==
Julio Mejia and Matt Toth were born and raised in Miami, Florida. They met through social networking in 2010, when a mutual friend introduced them on Facebook. Together the duo began their careers DJing in local bars, college parties and hookah lounges in Scranton. They began producing electronic music from a converted dorm room in an office in Scranton. Deciding on their stage name, Julio and Matt considered Grand Theft Audio and decided on its abbreviation, GTA.

The duo later gave new meaning to the acronym, defining GTA as Good Times Ahead.

== Career ==
Between late 2011 and early 2012, GTA released numerous remixes and productions on Laidback Luke's MixMash Records. They were featured on Diplo's "Express Yourself" EP and released their own debut EP, People Boots, on Chris Lake's Rising Music. In 2013, GTA provided remixes for deadmau5, Kaskade and others, while featuring collaborations such as "Boy Oh Boy" with Diplo and "Hit It" with Henrix and Digital Lab.

GTA has played major music festivals such as Lollapalooza, Ultra Music Festival, Coachella, Made In America, Electric Daisy Carnival, and Tomorrowland. In 2013, the duo toured with Rihanna as an opening act of her Diamonds World Tour, which became the sixth highest grossing worldwide tour of 2013 with a gross of $141.9 million from the shows played from January 1 to December 31, 2013.

The duo toured the globe with Tiesto and Calvin Harris on their Greater Than World Tour, which sold out Glasgow's The SSE Hydro arena three minutes after going on sale. GTA's headlining tours have included 2014's Death to Genres Tour, and 2015's Goons Take America Tour.

In 2015, GTA released "Intoxicated" with Martin Solveig, a remix for Rick Ross and Jay Z's "Movin Bass," and more. "Intoxicated" with Martin Solveig peaked at number 5 on the UK Singles Chart, and also charted in Austria, Belgium, Germany, Ireland, Netherlands, Scotland and Switzerland. It became Beatport's top selling house track of the year.

GTA released three EPs by the name of Death to Genres in 2015. Volume 1 was released in March with featured artists Paul Wall, TJR and more, followed by a remix edition known as Vol. 1.5 in August, and the sequel DTG Vol. 2 in November.

On November 27, 2015, GTA released Skrillex's remix of their original record "Red Lips." The music video was made in collaboration with Apple Music and was directed by Grant Singer. It took six months to make, according to Skrillex, who told Pitchfork "We treated it like it was just an art piece that we took our time doing, and it really felt right on the treatment."

In 2016, GTA released an album titled Good Times Ahead.

== Discography ==
=== Studio albums ===
- Good Times Ahead (2016)

=== Extended plays ===
- DTG, Vol. 1 (2015)
- DTG, Vol. 1.5 (2015)
- DTG, Vol. 2 (2015)
- DTG, Vol. 3 (2018)
- La Nueva Clásica - EP (2018)

=== Singles ===
2011

- U & I
- Next To Us

2012

- Move Around (with Diplo and Elephant Man)
- People Boots
- Devoid
- Shake Dem
- Booty Bounce (featuring DJ Funk)

2013

- Ai Novinha
- Alerta
- Hit It (with Henrix and Digital LAB)
- Landline (with A-Trak)
- Landline 2.0 (with A-Trak)
- Turn It Up (featuring Wolfpack) (with Dimitri Vegas & Like Mike)
- The Crowd
- Boy Oh Boy (with Diplo)
- Bola

2014

- Hard House (with Juyen Sebulba)

2015

- Intoxicated (with Martin Solveig)
- Mic Check (with TJR)
- Prison Riot (with Flosstradamus and Lil Jon)
- The Chase (featuring Aruna) (with Laidback Luke)
- Red Lips (featuring Sam Bruno)
- Saria's Turn Up
- Goons
- Hell Of A Night (with Sandro Silva (DJ))
- LCA

2016

- Help Me! (from Star Wars Headspace)
- Get It All (with Wax Motif)
- Feel It (featuring Tunji Ige) (with What So Not)

2017

- Hold On To Me (with Yellow Claw)
- Fiya Blaza (with DVBBS and Chris Marshall)
- Buyaka (with Falcons, featuring Stush)

2018

- Talkin Bout (with Dyro)
- Something Like
- Buscando (with Jenn Morel)

2019

- "Work It Out" (with Party Favor)
- "Fk It"

2020

- "Bmb" (with Fight Clvb)
- "Quando Toca Essa"
- "Let Go" (with Tony Romera)
- "Pshet"
- "No Time" (with Will K)

2021

- "So Good"
- "Rapido" (with Dabow)
- "La Fiesta"

2022

- "Without You" (with Kungs)
- "Belong" (with JSTJR and Jay Mason)
- "DBL Park"

=== Remixes ===
2011

- CZR, Paul Anthony and Zxx - Understand (GTA Remix)
- Laidback Luke vs Example - Natural Disaster (GTA Remix)
- Blink, Gianni Marino and Metsi - Bahasa (GTA Remix)
- Lana Del Rey - Video Games (GTA and LA Riots Remix)

2012

- Laidback Luke, Arno Cost and Norman Doray - Trilogy (GTA Remix)
- Breakdown - F_ckin’ Lose It (GTA Remix)
- Silver Medallion - Stay Young (GTA Remix)
- Clockwork - BBBS (GTA Remix)
- Michael Woods - Last Day On Earth (GTA Remix)

2013

- Congorock and Stereo Massive (featuring Sean Paul) - Bless Di Nation (GTA Remix)
- deadmau5 and Wolfgang Gartner - Channel 42 (GTA Remix)
- Bajofondo - Pide Piso (GTA Remix)
- The Bloody Beetroots (featuring Tai and Bart B More) - Spank (GTA Remix)
- Kaskade and Deadmau5 - Move for Me (GTA Remix)
- JWLS - Bashin’ (GTA 140 Mix)
- Kylie Minogue - Skirt (GTA Remix)
- Kaskade - Atmosphere (GTA Remix)
- Calvin Harris - Thinking About You (featuring Ayah Marar) (GTA Remix)

2014

• Iggy Azalea feat Charli XCX - Fancy (GTA Remix)

2015

- Diplo and Alvaro (featuring Kstylis) - 6th Gear (GTA Remix)
- Kill the Noise - Saturn (GTA Remix)
- Rick Ross - Movin’ Bass (featuring Jay Z) (GTA Remix)
- Crookers - I Just Can't (featuring Jeremih) (GTA Remix)
- Galantis - Peanut Butter Jelly (GTA Remix)
- Rihanna - Bitch Better Have My Money (GTA Remix)
- Giraffage - Tell Me (GTA Remix)
- Craze - Bow Down (featuring Trick Daddy) (GTA Remix)

2016

- Yellow Claw and DJ Mustard - In My Room (featuring Ty Dolla Sign and Tyga) (GTA Remix)

2018

- Virtual Self - "Ghost Voices" (GTA Psy Edit)

2019

- GTA and Valentino Khan - "Break Your Neck" (Part 2 VIP)
- Major Lazer, J Balvin and El Alfa - "Que Calor" (Good Times Ahead Remix)
- Dog Blood - "4 MIND" (featuring josh pan and X&G) (Good Times Ahead Remix)

2021

- Must Die! - "Sorrow Tech" (Good Times Ahead Remix)

=== JWLS ===
Singles

- Let's Swag (with Gianni Marino) (2012)
- Bashin’ (2012)
- Lagrimas (2012)

Remixes

- Simo T & Paris FZ - Dancing Alone (JWLS Extra Sauce Remix) (2011)
- Tommie Sunshine - Tonight's The Night (JWLS Remix) (2011)
- Codes - Ready Aim Fire (JWLS Remix) (2011)
- Buraka Som Sistema - Tira o pe (JWLS Remix) (2012)
- From the Back (featuring Danny Brown) (JWLS Remix) (2012)
- Lady Chann - Darkness (JWLS Remix) (2012)
- 2 Edit - Datsun Tropicalia (JWLS Remix) (2012)
- Craze - Selekta (JWLS Remix) (2012)
- A-Trak and DJ Zink - Like The Dancefloor (JWLS Remix) (2012)

=== Van Toth ===
Singles

- Don't Stop (2010)
- Grimecoat! (2010)
- Banana (2010)
- Fang Shui (2010)
- How You Feelin’ (2010)
- Influences (2010)

Remixes

- Dub Kay - Let It Go (Van Toth Epic Remix) (2010)
- DJ DLG - Visions of Love (Van Toth Remix) (2011)
- Gina Turner - Giovanna (Van Toth Remix) (2012)
