= Yellow Claw (DJs) =

Dutch DJs

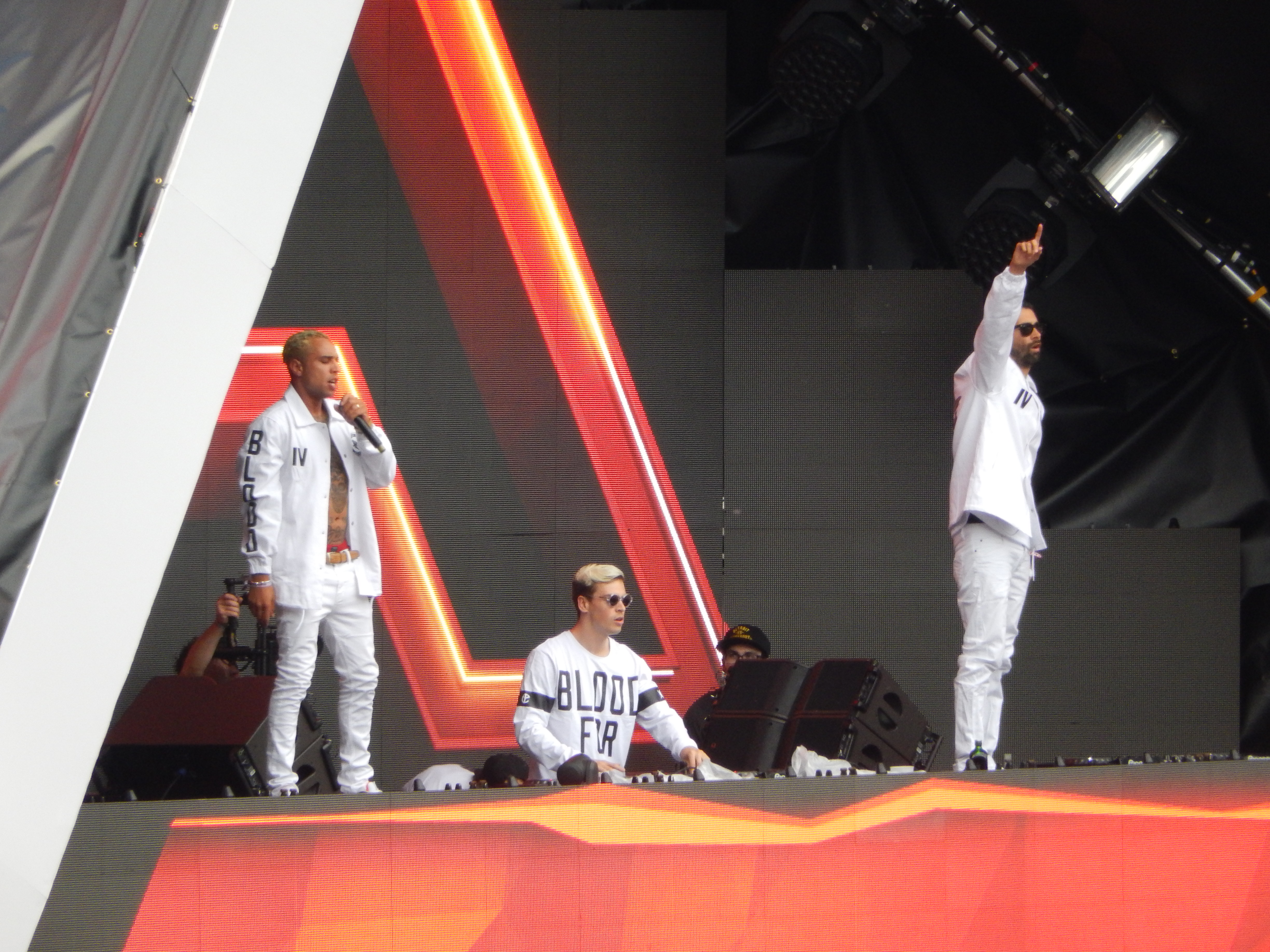
- Yellow Claw at the Spring Awakening in 2015

Background information
- Also known as: €URO TRA$H
- Origin: Amsterdam, Netherlands
- Genres: Trap; hip hop; hardstyle; moombahton
- Occupations: DJs; record producers; label owners
- Years active: 2010–present
- Labels: Barong Family; Roc Nation; Mad Decent; Spinnin'; Dim Mak; Sony; Universal
- Members: Jim Taihuttu; Nils Rondhuis
- Past members: Bizzey
- Website: yellowclaw.com

Yellow Claw is a Dutch DJ and record production duo from Amsterdam consisting of Jim Taihuttu, based in Bali, and Nils Rondhuis, based in Amsterdam. The duo's music is a mix of a wide range of genres and often incorporates elements from trap, hip hop, hardstyle and moombahton.

== Career ==
Yellow Claw first gained popularity in the middle of 2010, after founding and hosting a night party at one of Amsterdam's most famous night clubs, the Jimmy Woo. During 2012 and 2013, they released a number of successful singles, which charted on the Dutch and Belgian national charts: "Krokobil", "Nooit Meer Slapen", "Thunder" and "Last Night Ever". The music videos for the singles became popular, each gaining over four million views on YouTube. During that time, Yellow Claw performed at many Dutch festivals, such as DirtyDutch Festival, Sneakerz Festival, Latin Village Festival and Solar Festival.

In 2013, Yellow Claw signed to Diplo's label Mad Decent. On 7 March 2013, they released their first international EP Amsterdam Trap Music. In June, they performed at Diplo and Friends on BBC Radio 1, and in July – at the 2013 Tomorrowland Festival. On 26 September 2013, they put out their second EP, titled Amsterdam Twerk Music.

On 1 November 2013, after signing to Spinnin' Records, the group released their first international single "Shotgun", featuring vocals from Dutch singer Rochelle. The single peaked at number 10 in the Netherlands and number 20 in Belgium. On 8 November 2013, Yellow Claw released a collaboration single with Flosstradamus, titled "Pillz", under Fool's Gold Records and Ultra Music.

In 2015, Yellow Claw released their debut studio album, Blood for Mercy. The album's lead single, "In My Room" features American record producer DJ Mustard and American rappers Ty Dolla Sign and Tyga.

On 22 June 2016, Yellow Claw announced on their official Facebook page that MC Bizzey decided to leave the group since he became a father. EDC Las Vegas 2016 was their last show as a trio.

On 31 March 2017, Yellow Claw released their second studio album called Los Amsterdam. The album's included several hit songs such as "Light Years" featuring Rochelle, "City On Lockdown" featuring Lil Debbie and Juicy J, "Good Day" features DJ Snake & Elliphant, "Hold on to Me" featuring GTA. The album released under the Mad Decent Label.

In July 2017, Yellow Claw performed on the Mainstage of Tomorrowland 2017. This marked their first ever time as an act on the Mainstage.

They released their third studio album, New Blood, on 22 June 2018. The album features collaborations with a range of producers and singers including San Holo, DJ Snake, ASAP Ferg while comprising singles "Summertime", "Crash This Party", "Bittersweet", "Fake Chanel", "To The Max", "Public Enemy", and "Waiting".

On 12 July 2019, Yellow Claw released their single "Get Up" featuring KIDDO, the song was released under the Roc Nation label although they hadn't signed with the label at the time. In August 2019, Yellow Claw officially signed to Roc Nation, followed by the release of their new single "Baila Conmigo" featuring Saweetie, Inna, and Jenn Morel.

On 31 January 2020, Yellow Claw released their fourth studio album called Never Dies. The album released under the Roc Nation Label.

On 2 July 2021, Yellow Claw launched their side project named Euro Trash (stylised "€URO TRA$H"), focusing primarily on bass house and techno, and released their debut track under it, "Trust You" featuring Psycho Boys Club and Bonnie Strange.

On 27 February 2026, over six years after their previous album, Yellow Claw released their fifth studio album, 'Jesus Loves Trap Music'. This release marks their second studio album under their independent label, Barong Family, following the release of 'New Blood' in 2018.

== Members ==
Current

- Jim Taihuttu, born 6 July 1981 – DJ and record producer
- Nils Rondhuis, born 6 September 1987 – DJ and record producer

Former

- Leonardo Roelandschap (known as Bizzey), born 11 May 1985 - rapper. (2010–2016)

== Barong Family ==
Barong Family Logo

In May 2014, Yellow Claw inaugurated their own label, called Barong Family, which were distributed by Spinnin' Records until early 2015. The first signed artist was fellow Amsterdam group Mightyfools, and the first official release was the song "Lick Dat" on 2 June 2014. The second single, Yung Felix's "Money Grabber" was released on 25 August 2014.

Barong Family now has over 600 releases.

== Discography ==
- Blood for Mercy (2015)
- Los Amsterdam (2017)
- New Blood (2018)
- Never Dies (2020)
- Jesus Loves Trap Music (2026)
