= Alda =

Alda may refer to:

== Places ==
=== United States ===
- Alda, Nebraska, a village
- Alda Township, Hall County, Nebraska

=== Spain ===
- Alda, Álava, a hamlet in Harana/Valle de Arana

== People ==
- Alda (name), a given name and surname
- Alda (singer) (born 1966), Icelandic singer
- Alda Risma (1982–2006), Indonesian singer
- Frances Alda (1897-1952), Australian opera singer

== Other uses ==
- Tropical Storm Alda, 1999
- Alda (automobile), a French automobile manufactured between 1912 and 1922
- Alda (comedy), a 12th-century elegiac comedy of William of Blois
- European Association for Local Democracy (ALDA), an international non-governmental organisation created in 1999
- Association of Late-Deafened Adults, an American organization for people who become deaf after childhood
- ALDA Events, a Dutch events management company

== See also ==
- Alder (disambiguation)
- Aldavilla, New South Wales
