= Aude (name) =

- Gender: Female
- Language: French

Origin
- Language: Germanic
- Meaning: Wise
- Region of origin: France

Other names
- Variant forms: Audélia, Audeline, Aoda, Eodez, Haude, Heodez, Auda
- Derived: Ald (wikt:old) + -a
- Related names: Alda
- Popularity: see popular names

Aude is a French female given name.

== Etymology ==
Aude is an anthroponym of the Germanic Alda, based on ald meaning“old” , and therefore “wise”, followed by the feminine ending -a that became a silent e in French.

== Variants ==
Two of the most common variants are Audélia and Audeline.

=== Variant forms ===
- Breton : Aoda, Eodez, Haude, Heodez
- Italian : Auda
- Occitan : Auda

== Name day ==
Saint Aude can refer to:

- Haude of Trémazan († 545), martyr in the Pays de Léon in Brittany, celebrated on November 18th.
- Aude of Paris (early 6th century), disciple of Saint Genevieve, celebrated on November 18th.

== Notable people ==
- Aude of France, natural daughter of Charles Martel and mother of William of Gellone
- Aude the Deep-Minded, 9th century Viking queen
- Aude Amadou, French politician
- Aude Banasiak, French football player
- Aude Biannic (born 1991), French cyclist
- Aude Bono-Vandorme, French physicist and politician
- Aude Cassagne (born1990), French cyclist
- Aude Compan, French sailor
- Aude Lancelin, French journalist
- Aude Luquet (born 1967), French politician
- Aude Massot, French comic book artist

== See also ==
- Alda (name)
- Sainte-Aulde
