= Alder (surname) =

Alder or Alders is a surname. Notable people with the surname include:

- Alan Alder (1937–2019), Australian ballet dancer
- Alison Alder (born 1958), Australian screenprinter
- Berni Alder (1925–2020), German-born American physicist
- Christian Alder (born 1978), German football player
- Christopher Alder (1960–1998), British soldier who died in police custody; Death of Christopher Alder
- Daniel Alders, American politician
- Danny Alder (born before 2007), Australian actor
- Don Alder (born before 1985), Canadian guitarist
- Douglas D. Alder (1932–2023), American historian and academic administrator
- Esther Alder (born 1958), Swiss politician
- Fred Alder (1889–1960), Australian football player
- Guillermo Alder (born 1971), Argentine cross-country skier
- Henry Alder (1874–1949), Australian football player
- Inés Alder (born 1970), Argentine cross-country skier
- Janine Alder (born 1995), Swiss ice hockey player
- Jim Alder (born 1940), British distance runner
- John C. Alder (born 1944), English musician better known as "Twink"
- Jonathan Alder (1773–1849), American pioneer
- Joshua Alder (1792–1867), British zoologist and malacologist
- Kurt Alder (1902–58), German chemist, 1950 Nobel Prize in Chemistry
  - Alder (crater), a lunar crater named after Kurt
  - Diels–Alder reaction, a chemical reaction named after Otto Diels and Kurt
- Mike Alder (born before 2004), Australian mathematician and writer
- Ray Alder (born 1967), American singer, Fates Warning
- Roger Alder (born before 2005), British chemist
- Thomas Alder (1932–68), German actor
- Vera Stanley Alder (1898–1984), English portrait painter and mystic
- Viviana Alder (born 1957), Argentine researcher

Other people named Alder

- George Alder Blumer (1857–1940), British-born American physician, mental hospital administrator and journal editor
- Rhondda Alder Kelly (1926–2014), Australian beauty queen
- William Alder Strange (1813–74), English headmaster and author
- Charles Romley Alder Wright (1844–94), English chemist and physicist

== See also ==
- Alford & Alder, a British former automotive engineering company
- Gregory Scott Aldering (born 1960), American astronomer
- Alda (name)
- Alders (disambiguation)
- Allder (disambiguation)
