= Alders (surname) =

Alders and Aalders are Dutch patronymic surname, meaning "son of Aldert/Aaldert", a Dutch version of the name Adelard. People with that name include:

== People ==
=== Alders ===
- Hanny Alders (1946–2010), Dutch author
- Hans Alders (born 1950), Dutch politician
- Jacky Alders (born 1956), Belgian sprint canoer who competed in the 1976 Summer Olympics
- Jay Alders (born 1973), American fine artist, photographer and graphic designer
- Joey Alders (born 1999), Dutch racing driver
- Robyn Alders (born ca. 1960), Australian veterinary scientist

=== Aalders ===
- Willem Jan Aalders (1870–1945), Dutch theologian

== See also ==
- Alder (disambiguation)
  - Alder (surname)
- Alda (name)
- Allder (disambiguation)
