= Dyro discography =

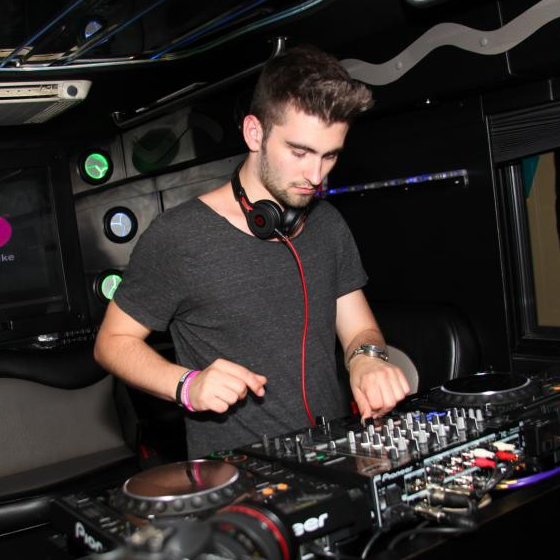
Dyro in 2013

This is the discography for Dutch DJ and record producer Dyro.

== Extended plays ==
Year	Title	Release details
2011	Dirty Mind	Released: 29 June 2011; Label: Grapevine; Format: Digital download
2011	Metaphor / Magno	Released: 5 December 2011; Label: Revealed Recordings; Format: Digital download
2016	Set Me Free	Released: 22 February 2016; Label: WOLV Records; Format: Digital download
2020	Bombai	Released: 9 January 2020; Label: Stmpd Rcrds; Format: Digital Download

== Compilation albums ==
Year	Title	Details
2011	Talent Revealed, Vol. 1 (with KURA and Luke R)	Released: 7 November 2011; Label: Revealed Recordings; Format: CD, digital download
2012	The Sound Of Revealed 2012 (mixed by Dannic & Dyro)	Released: 7 December 2012; Label: Revealed Recordings; Format: CD, digital download
2015	WOLVPACK, Vol. 1 (mixed by Dyro)	Released: 9 October 2015; Label: WOLV Records; Format: Digital download

== Singles ==
Incomplete list of songs by Dyro
Year	Title	Album	Label	Chart peaks				
Year	Title	Album	Label	BEL	US Dance	NL	UK	UK Dance
2011	"Dirty Mind"	Non-album singles	Grapevine Grooves	—	—	—	—	—
2011	"Meat Lover"	Non-album singles	Suit Records	—	—	—	—	—
2011	"Klav"	Non-album singles	Mixmash Records	—	—	—	—	—
2011	"Wrecked"	Non-album singles	Amsterdam Massive	—	—	—	—	—
2011	"AMP"	Non-album singles	Amsterdam Massive	—	—	—	—	—
2011	"South Avenue"	Non-album singles	Grapevine Grooves	—	—	—	—	—
2011	"Daftastic"	Non-album singles	Revealed Recordings	—	—	—	—	—
2011	"Metaphor"	Non-album singles	Revealed Recordings	—	—	—	—	—
2011	"Magno"	Non-album singles	Revealed Recordings	—	—	—	—	—
2012	"EMP" (with Jacob Van Hage)	Non-album singles	Smash the House	—	—	—	—	—
2012	"Raid" (with Rene Kuppens)	Non-album singles	Revealed Recordings	—	—	—	—	—
2012	"Saeta"	Non-album singles	Bazooka Records	—	—	—	—	—
2012	"Monster Talk" (with Loopers)	Non-album singles	Mixmash Records	—	—	—	—	—
2012	"Paradox"	Non-album singles	Revealed Recordings	—	—	—	—	—
2012	"Top of the World" (with Ansol)	Non-album singles	Spinnin' Records	—	—	—	—	—
2012	"Sky High" (with Amba Shepherd)	Non-album singles	Strictly Rhythm	—	—	—	—	—
2013	"Paradise" (Original Mix) (with Tiësto)	Club Life: V. 3 Stockholm	Musical Freedom	—	—	—	—	—
2013	"Grid" (with Bassjackers)	Non-album singles	Spinnin' Records	—	—	—	—	—
2013	"Go Down"	Non-album singles	Revealed Recordings	—	—	—	—	—
2013	"You Gotta Know" (featuring Radboud)	Non-album singles	Revealed Recordings	—	—	—	—	—
2013	"Never Say Goodbye" (with Hardwell featuring Bright Lights)	Hardwell presents 'Revealed V. 4'	Revealed Recordings	20	—	—	—	—
2013	"Leprechauns & Unicorns"	Hardwell presents 'Revealed V. 4'	Revealed Recordings	—	—	—	—	—
2014	"Wolv"	Non-album singles	WOLV	—	—	—	—	—
2014	"Black Smoke"	Non-album singles	Revealed Recordings	—	—	—	—	—
2014	"Radical" (with Dannic)	Non-album singles	Revealed Recordings	—	—	—	—	—
2014	"Calling Out" (featuring Ryder)	Non-album singles	Revealed Recordings	—	—	—	—	—
2014	"Sounds Like"	Non-album singles	Revealed Recordings	—	—	—	—	—
2014	"Against All Odds" (with Dynamite MC)	Non-album singles	WOLV	—	—	—	—	—
2014	"X" (with Bassjackers)	Non-album singles	WOLV	—	—	—	—	—
2015	"Bittersweet" (with Conro featuring Envy Monroe)	Non-album singles	Revealed Recordings	—	—	—	—	—
2015	"Pure Noise"	Non-album singles	WOLV	—	—	—	—	—
2015	"Foxtrot"	Non-album singles	WOLV	—	—	—	—	—
2015	"Jack It Up" (with Loopers)	Non-album singles	WOLV	—	—	—	—	—
2018	"Talkin' Bout" (with GTA)	Non-album singles	Spinnin' Records	—	—	—	—	—
2018	"Feel It Coming"	Non-album singles	Monstercat	—	—	—	—	—
2018	"Bring It Down"	Non-album singles	Stmpd Rcrds	—	—	—	—	—
2018	"Latency" (with Martin Garrix)	Bylaw EP	Stmpd Rcrds	—	—	—	—	—
2018	"I Know U" (with Loopers)	Non-album single	Stmpd Rcrds	—	—	—	—	—
2019	"Bombai"	Bombai EP	Stmpd Rcrds	—	—	—	—	—
2019	"Goliath"	Bombai EP	Stmpd Rcrds	—	—	—	—	—
2019	"Free" (featuring Nigel Hey and Babet)	Bombai EP	Stmpd Rcrds	—	—	—	—	—
2019	"Masquerade"	Bombai EP	Stmpd Rcrds	—	—	—	—	—
2020	"Warp Speed" (with Julian Calor)	Non-album singles	Stmpd Rcrds	—	—	—	—	—
2020	"Hella Dope"	Non-album singles	Stmpd Rcrds	—	—	—	—	—
2020	"Bounce Back"	Non-album singles	Stmpd Rcrds	—	—	—	—	—
2021	"Memory Bank" (with Conro)	Non-album singles	Monstercat	—	—	—	—	—
2021	"Around"	Non-album singles	Hexagon	—	—	—	—	—
"—" denotes a recording that did not chart or was not released in that territory.

== Remixes ==
The following is an incomplete list of remixes by Dyro, with year of remix release, track name, original artist, and label:

- 2011: "Turn It Up" (Dyro Remix) – Aint & Nino Fish featuring Rufus Martin
- 2011: "I Know It's Hard" (Dyro Remix) – Doc Meyer
- 2011: "Work Hard Play Hard" (Dyro & Loopers Remix) – Tiësto featuring Kay
- 2012: "Lifeline" (Dyro Remix) – Kevin Doherty featuring Amba Shepherd
- 2012: "Love Comes In Colours" (Dyro Remix) – Arjonas and Chris Jones
- 2012: "Line" (Dyro Remix) – Tom Tyger
- 2012: "Kontiki" (Dyro Remix) – Hardwell and Dannic
- 2012: "The Bottle Song" (Dyro Remix) – R3hab
- 2012: "Wide Awake" (Dyro Remix) – Katy Perry (Capitol)
- 2012: "Can't Stop Me" (R3hab & Dyro Remix) – Afrojack and Shermanology (Spinnin' Records)
- 2012: "Night Like This" (Dyro Remix) – Laidback Luke & Angger Dimas featuring Polina
- 2012: "Feed The Dada" (Dyro Remix) – Dada Life
- 2012: "Iron (Dyro Remix)" – Nicky Romero and Calvin Harris (Protocol Recordings)
- 2012: "Close Enemies (Dyro Remix)" – Example (Ministry of Sound)
- 2012: "Dealbreaker" (Dyro Remix) – Loopers
- 2013: "Make Some Noise" (Dyro Remix) – Tiësto and Swanky Tunes featuring Ben McInerney
- 2013: "Tracking Treasure Down Revisited (Dyro Remix)" – Gabriel & Dresden featuring Molly Bancroft (Organized Nature)
- 2013: "Carry Me" (Dyro Remix) – Morgan Page featuring Nadia Ali
- 2013: "Ghost" (Dyro Remix) – Pink Is Punk and Benny Benassi featuring Heather Bright
- 2013: "Sunrise (Won't Get Lost)" (Dyro Remix) – The Aston Shuffle and Tommy Trash
- 2013: "Right Now (Dyro Radio Edit)" – Rihanna featuring David Guetta (Def Jam)
- 2013: "Spank" (Dyro Edit) – Bloody Beetroots featuring TAI and Bart B More
- 2013: "Dance the Pain Away" (Dyro Remix) – Benny Benassi featuring John Legend
- 2013: "Center of the Universe" (Dyro Remix) – Axwell
- 2013: "Afterglow (Dyro Remix)" – Wilkinson (RAM Records)
- 2014: "Welcome" (Dyro Remix) – Bali Bandits (Wolv)
- 2014: "Get Up (Rattle) (Dyro's Instrumental Remix)" – Far East Movement (Spinnin' Records)
- 2015: "Lapdance (Dyro Bootleg)" – N.E.R.D
- 2016: "Spacetunnel (Dyro Edit)" – Prism x Funkz (Wolv)
- 2017: "Anomaly (Dyro Remix)" – Noisia (Vision)
- 2017: "TH2C" (Dyro Remix) – Krewella (Mixed Kids Records)
- 2018: "Lick It" (Dyro Remix) – Valentino Khan (Spinnin' Records)
- 2018: "The Drop" (Dyro Remix) – Gammer (Monstercat)
- 2019: "These Are the Times" (Dyro Remix) – Martin Garrix featuring Jrm (Stmpd Rcrds)
