= Alder (disambiguation) =

Alder is the common name of Alnus, a genus of shrubs and small trees.

Alder may also refer to:

== People ==
- Alder (surname)

== Places ==
- Alder, Colorado
- Alder, Montana, United States
- Alder, Washington, United States
- Alders Brook, a small tributary of the River Roding
- Alder Creek (disambiguation)
- Alder River, Nova Scotia, Canada
- Des Aulnes River (Laflamme River) (English: Alders River), Quebec, Canada

== Other uses ==
- Alder (crater), lunar crater
- Alder (Pendragon series), a fictional character in The Pendragon Adventure
- Dwarf alder (disambiguation), common name of several plants
- Witch alder, plants of genus Fothergilla
- A shortened form of Aldernalisuvara, an alternative name of the Hindu deity Ardhanari particularly used by Japanese
- Alder (Pokémon), the champion of the Unova League in Pokémon Black and White
- Alders (surname)
- A shortened, gender-neutral form of Alderman

== See also ==
- Alda (disambiguation)
- Elder (disambiguation)
