= Amsterdam Music Festival =

Dutch music festival

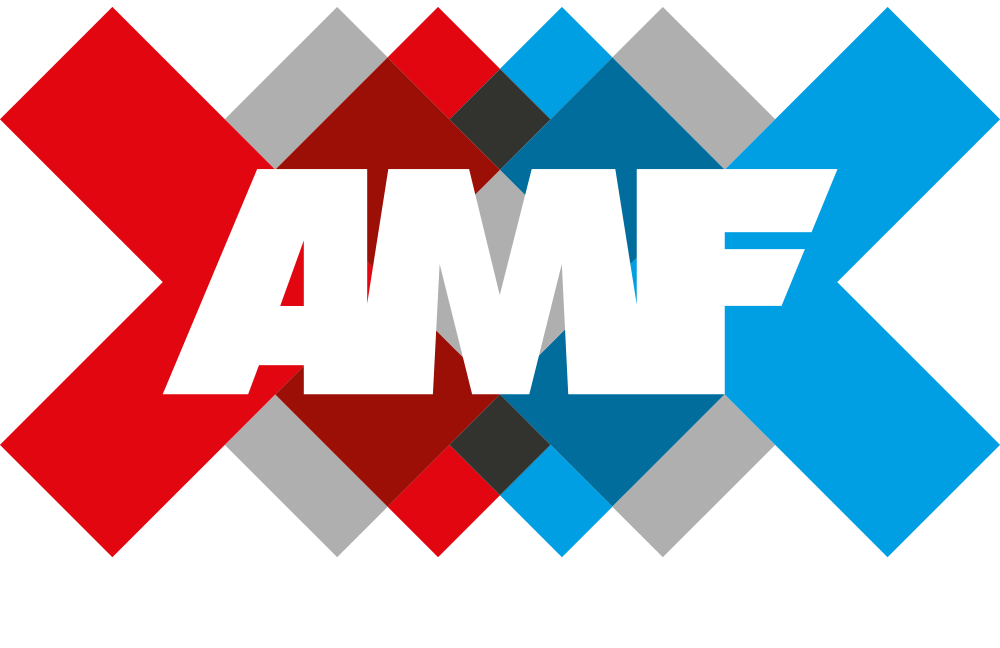

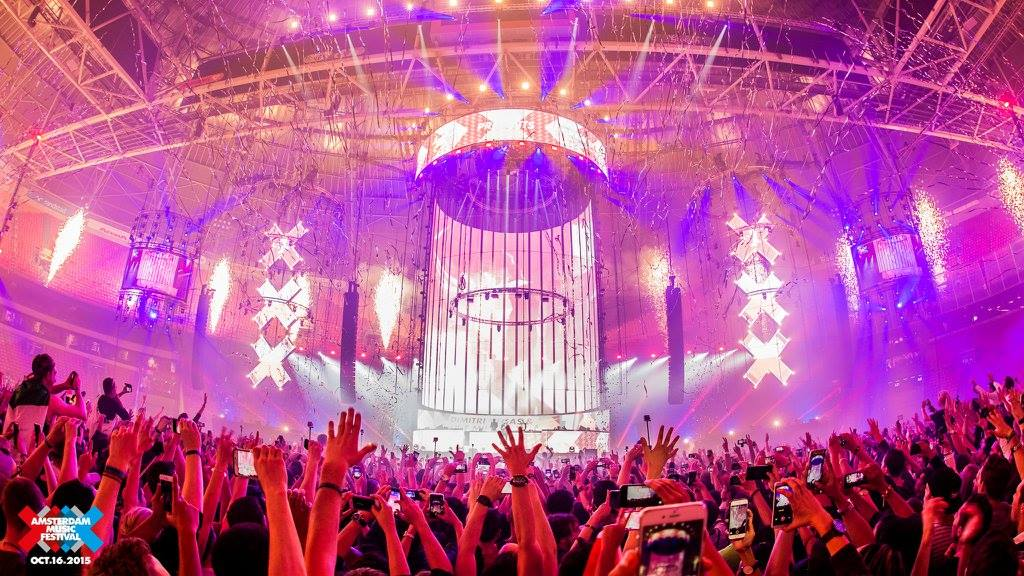
- 2015 Amsterdam Music Festival
- Genre: House, dance, trance and electro
- Locations: Johan Cruijff Arena, Amsterdam, Netherlands
- Years active: 2013–present
- Organiser: ALDA Events
- Website: www.amf-festival.com

The Amsterdam Music Festival (AMF) is an electronic dance music (EDM) event that takes place during the Amsterdam Dance Event mid-October in Amsterdam, Netherlands. Since the second edition in 2014, the main event has taken place in the Johan Cruijff Arena. In 2015 and 2016 the event was a multiple day EDM-event.

During the AMF, the DJ Mag Top 100 DJs is announced and several prizes are awarded, among which the award for the number one DJ in the world. The music that is played is mostly house and dance music; other genres that are also played at the event include techno, trance and hardstyle.

== History ==
In 2013 ALDA Events and ID&T organised the first edition of AMF together, to celebrate the 25th anniversary of Dutch Dance. The first edition took place in RAI Amsterdam and had 25,000 visitors.

Due to the big interest the second edition of the event, in 2014, moved from RAI Amsterdam to the Amsterdam Arena. The event grows to 35,000 visitors.

In 2015 the event expands to a two-day event, of which the first evening was dominated by the DJ Mag Top 100 award show and the second evening - which was also being held in the ArenA - was filled with a various lineup. In addition, AMF starts their cooperation with Dance4Life, an NGO that works together with youngsters to build a world without AIDS. For every ticket sold, AMF donates 50 cents to the charity

In 2016 organizers ALDA Events and ID&T decided to expand the event even further to eight events on five evenings, in three venues: Amsterdam ArenA, Heineken Music Hall and Ziggo Dome. With an official opening and closing ceremony, two shows in the Amsterdam ArenA and several hostings, the fourth edition of AMF was the biggest festival during the Amsterdam Dance Event with 45,000 visitors. According to market research office GfK Netherlands, AMF generated almost 28 million euros for the economy of Amsterdam.

In 2017 the first lustrum edition of AMF was celebrated, with a one-night only show. For the lustrum edition, they launched a new concept: 'II=I' (pronounced Two is One). During the event they let two DJs or DJ-acts play a special back to back set.

In June 2018 it was collectively decided that ALDA would organize AMF without ID&T, after years of a successful collaboration. According to the manager of ID&T, the reasons included that they wanted to focus on new projects of their own.

== Information per edition ==
Year	Date	Event	Location	On stage
2013	October 19	Amsterdam Music Festival	RAI Amsterdam	Alesso, Armin van Buuren, Dimitri Vegas & Like Mike, Dyro, Fedde Le Grand, Hardwell, Showtek, Steve Angello, Sunnery James & Ryan Marciano, W&W, AN21, Congorock, FeestDJRuud, Jaz von D, Roog, Sem Vox, The Flexican, The Partysquad, Yellow Claw
2014	October 18	Amsterdam Music Festival	Amsterdam ArenA	Armin van Buuren, Dannic, Dash Berlin, David Guetta, Deorro, Dimitri Vegas & Like Mike, Hardwell, Martin Garrix, Oliver Heldens, Omnia, Wildstylez, W&W
2015	October 16	Amsterdam Music Festival	Amsterdam ArenA	Armin van Buuren, Dimitri Vegas & Like Mike, Hardwell, Martin Garrix, Nervo, Vicetone
2015	October 17	Amsterdam Music Festival	Amsterdam ArenA	Afrojack, David Guetta, Klingande, Oliver Heldens, Robin Schulz, Tiesto, DJ Snake, Showtek, Yellow Claw
2016	October 19	AMF Official Opening Night	Heineken Music Hall	Angerfist, Kshmr, Martin Garrix, Nervo, Oliver Heldens, Swanky Tunes
2016	20 October	AMF Hardwell presents Revealed	Heineken Music Hall	Atmozfears, Dannic, Kill the Buzz, Knife Party, Kris Kross Amsterdam, Hardwell
2016	October 21	AMF Tiësto Presents Clublife 500	Ziggo Dome	Tiësto, Hardwell, The Chainsmokers, Mike Williams
2016	October 22	T-Mobile Presents AMF ArenA Saturday	Amsterdam ArenA	Alesso, David Guetta, Don Diablo, Ferreck Dawn, Hardwell, Jay Hardway, Showtek, Sunnery James & Ryan Marciano, The Chainsmokers, W&W
2016	October 22	AMF Presents SLAM!	Ziggo Dome	Deorro, Don Diablo, FeestDJRuud, Headhunterz, Kungs, Lucas & Steve, Mike Williams, Nervo, Sander van Doorn, Steve Aoki, The Juke
2016	October 22	AMF: Axwell Λ Ingrosso	Heineken Music hall	Axwell Λ Ingrosso, Klahr, New ID, Salvatore Ganacci, Shapov, Sylvain Armand
2016	October 23	T-Mobile Presents AMF ArenA Sunday	Amsterdam ArenA	Afrojack, Armin van Buuren, Blasterjaxx, Cid, Dash Berlin, Dillon Francis, Dimitri Vegas & Like Mike, Dvbbs, Jonas Blue, Nicky Romero, Steve Aoki
2016	October 23	AMF & Friends: The Official Closing	Heineken Music Hall	Bassjackers, Dannic, DubVision, Dillon Francis, Dvbbs, Firebeatz, Jay Hardway, Pep & Rash, Quintino, Tony Junior, Ummet Ozcan, Wiwek
2017	October 21	T-Mobile Presents AMF ArenA (Night Show)	Amsterdam ArenA	Armin van Buuren back 2 back Hardwell (II = I), David Guetta, Dimitri Vegas & Like Mike, Don Diablo, Lucas & Steve, Marshmello, Vini Vici, Yellow Claw
2018	October 20	AMF	Johan Cruijff Arena (previously Amsterdam ArenA)	David Guetta back 2 back Dimitri Vegas & Like Mike (II = I), W&W, Sunnery James & Ryan Marciano, Martin Garrix, Kshmr, Lost Frequencies, Vini Vici, Axwell & Ingrosso, Salvatore Ganacci
2019	October 19	AMF	Johan Cruijff Arena	Timmy Trumpet back 2 back W&W (II = I), Alesso, Armin van Buuren, Jonas Blue, Tiësto, David Guetta, Dimitri Vegas & Like Mike, Don Diablo, Coone
2020	October 24	AMF	Johan Cruijff Arena	Cancelled
2021	October 23	AMF	Johan Cruijff Arena	Cancelled
2022	October 22	AMF	Johan Cruijff Arena	Kapuchon (Warm Up), Topic, Armin van Buuren, Afrojack B2B Nicky Romero (II = I), Tiësto, Timmy Trumpet, Martin Garrix, Brennan Heart
2023	October 21	AMF	Johan Cruijff Arena	Like Mike (DJ) (Warm Up), Purple Disco Machine, Meduza, James Hype, Armin van Buuren, Dimitri Vegas & Like Mike, Afrojack, Charlotte De Witte, Vini Vici, Headhunterz
2024	October 19	AMF	Johan Cruijff Arena	Monocule (Warm Up), Tita Lau, Wade, Marlon Hoffstadt, Martin Garrix, Tiësto, Timmy Trumpet, Maddix (DJ), Showtek
2025	October 25	AMF	Johan Cruijff Arena	Afrosalto (Afrojack x Gregor Salto) [Warm Up], Miss Monique, Morten, John Summit,Oliver Heldens, Hardwell, Armin van Buuren back 2 back KI/KI (Solo and II = I), Sara Landry, Sub Zero Project
2026	October 24	AMF	Johan Cruijff Arena	Afrojack, Amelie Lens, Armin Van Buuren, ARTBAT, D-Block & S-te-Fan, David Guetta, Korolova, Marlon Hoffstadt

== Music ==
In 2015 and 2016 an anthem was released for the event.

- 2015: Roovel – Skylights
- 2016: Jay Hardway – Amsterdam

== Filmography ==
Documentary and concert films

- Amsterdam Music Festival (2016) - Featuring interviews with Showtek, Hardwell and David Guetta, a concert film of the 2016 festival is available to stream now.
