= San Luis Creek =

San Luis Creek may refer to:

- San Luis Creek (Colorado), a creek in Saguache County, Colorado
- San Luis Creek (California), a creek in Merced County, California
