= Connect the dots (disambiguation) =

Connect the dots is a form of puzzle containing a sequence of numbered dots.

Connect the Dots may also refer to:

- "Connect the Dots" (Rubicon), the fifth episode of Rubicon
- Connect the Dots (Stacy Clark album), 2010
- Connect the Dots (MisterWives album), 2017
- "Connect the Dots" (song), a 2013 single by New Found Glory
- Connecting the Dots, an extended play by Conro
