= KI/KI =

Dutch DJ and record producer

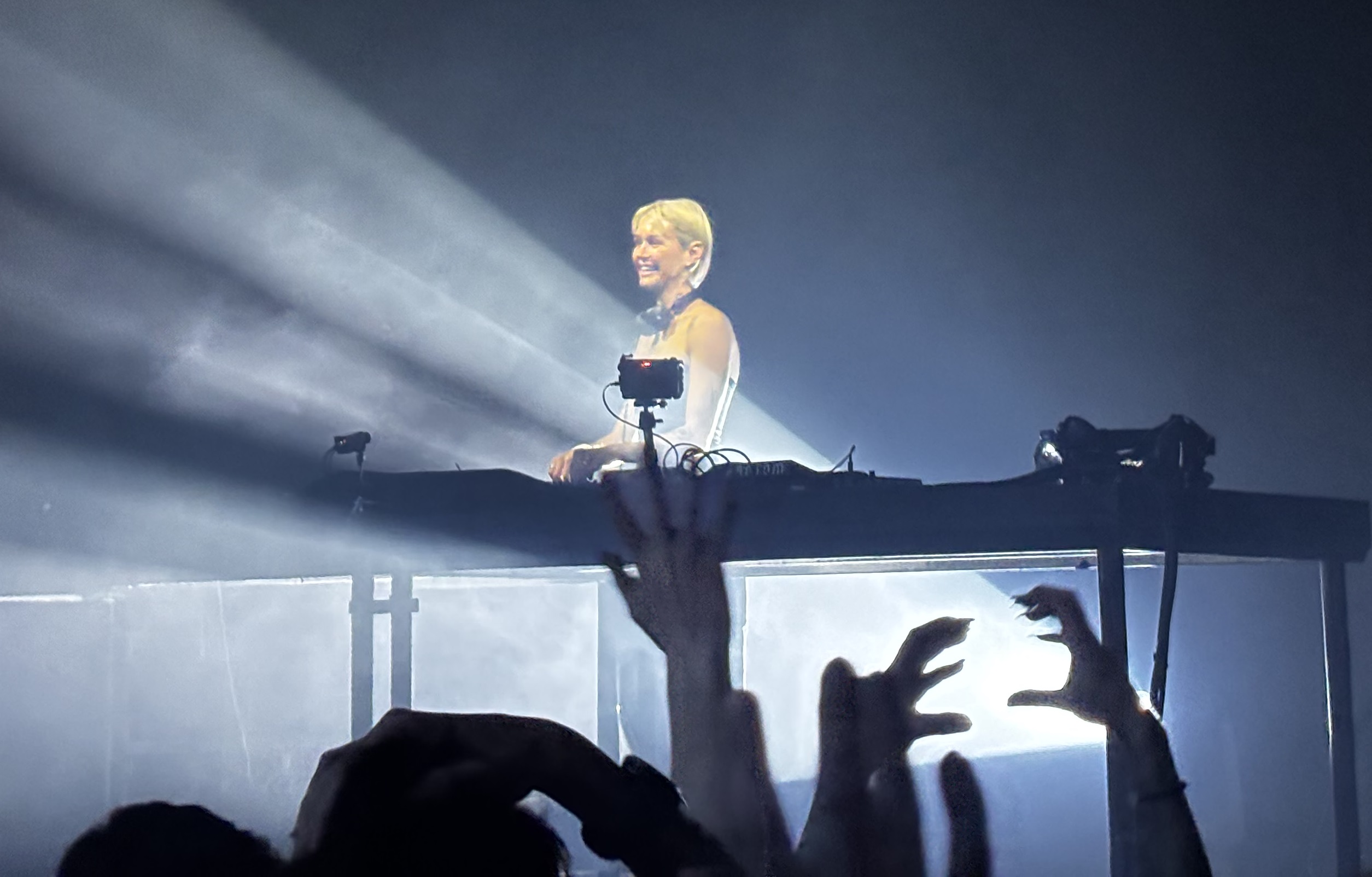
- KI/KI in 2026

Background information
- Born: Kiki Wesselo; 30 August 1996 (age 30); Harderwijk, Netherlands
- Origin: Amsterdam, Netherlands
- Genres: Techno; acid techno; trance
- Occupations: DJ; record producer
- Years active: 2018–present
- Labels: slash; Armada Music

Kiki Wesselo (born 30 August 1996), known professionally as KI/KI, is a Dutch DJ and record producer. Her music and DJ sets are associated with techno, acid techno, and trance. She first became known through Amsterdam's queer club scene as a resident DJ at Spielraum, and later gained wider attention through festival appearances, extended sets, her label slash, and releases such as "Leave It to the Vibe" and "5 Mins of Acid".

== Early career ==
Wesselo grew up in Epe, Netherlands, where she became interested in trance music through artists such as Tiësto, Armin van Buuren and Faithless. She began producing techno at the age of fifteen and moved to Amsterdam at seventeen, where she learned to DJ and briefly played disco in a duo at a residency around Leidseplein.

She later began exploring early trance, proto-hardcore, new beat and rave records. In 2018, she performed one of her first major solo sets at Spielraum, a queer party then held at RADION in Amsterdam.

In 2019, KI/KI performed at Lowlands and Draaimolen Festival.

== Label, productions and live shows ==
In 2022, KI/KI founded the label slash. According to Armada Music, the label was established as a platform for music connected to her interest in trance, acid and techno, including older influences, emerging producers and her own releases. The first release on the label, slash 001 by Alpha Tracks, included KI/KI's remix of "To Nights" and was released in July 2022.

Her 2023 release slash 004 - Leave It to the Vibe included the tracks "Leave It to the Vibe", "To the Vibe (Rework)" and "Leave It to the Drums". In 2024, she released "5 Mins of Acid", later expanded into Slash 010 - 5 Mins of Acid - EP, issued through Armada Music under exclusive license from slash.

A 2024 DJ Mag feature described KI/KI as a DJ, producer, live performer and label head whose sets draw on classic trance, techno and acid while merging those influences with contemporary productions. Resident Advisor described her sound as a "radiant, hypnotic blend" of 1990s touchstones with modern energy, and noted appearances at clubs including Berghain, Bassiani and The Bunker New York.

== 2025–present ==
In 2025, KI/KI won the Dance category at the Edison Awards. She was the first woman to win the category.

In 2025, she released "Losing Control" with Marlon Hoffstadt, "Can't Stop Loving You", and "What's a Girl to Do in '25". The latter was released by Magnetron Records under exclusive license to Disorder.

In October 2025, KI/KI and Armin van Buuren released "Put Your Bassline", their first collaborative single. The track was announced as the official anthem of AMF 2025 and was released one day before their back-to-back performance at the Johan Cruijff ArenA during Amsterdam Dance Event 2025.

The performance marked the return of AMF's II=I, or "two is one", concept, with KI/KI and van Buuren performing together in a rare back-to-back set. Armada Music reported that the II=I series had previously featured pairings including van Buuren with Hardwell in 2017, Timmy Trumpet with W&W in 2019, and Afrojack with Nicky Romero in 2022.

== Musical style ==
KI/KI's style is commonly described as combining classic trance, techno, acid and rave influences. DJ Mag wrote that her sets, hybrid performances and live shows draw on classic trance, techno and acid, while VPRO 3voor12 connected her early breakthrough to hard trance, rave and 1990s records played at high energy. Armada Music described her sound as fast, dreamlike, futuristic, nostalgic and euphoric, shaped by trance, acid and techno.

== Discography ==
=== EPs ===
- slash 004 - Leave It to the Vibe (2023)
- Slash 010 - 5 Mins of Acid - EP (2024)

=== Singles ===
- "5 Mins of Acid" (2024)
- "Time for Acid" (2025)
- "Losing Control" (with Marlon Hoffstadt) (2025)
- "What's a Girl to Do in '25" (2025)
- "Can't Stop Loving You" (2025)
- "Put Your Bassline" (with Armin van Buuren) (2025)
- "5AM" (2026)
- "Arp12" (with Underworld) (2026)

=== Remixes ===
- Alpha Tracks – "To Nights" (KI/KI Remix) (2022)
- Felix – "Don't You Want Me" (KI/KI Remix)

== Awards and nominations ==
Year	Award	Category	Result	Ref.
2025	Edison Award	Dance	Won	
