= Allder =

Allder is a surname. Notable people with the surname include:

- Danny Alder (AKA Danny Allder, born before 2007), Australian actor
- Doug Allder (born 1951), English professional footballer
- Nick Allder (born 1943), English special effects supervisor and coordinator

== See also ==
- Allders, an English former department store
- Alda (name)
- Alder (surname)
- Alders (disambiguation)
