= Alder Creek =

Alder Creek may refer to:

- Alder Creek (Los Angeles County, California)
- Alder Creek (Mariposa County, California)
- Alder Creek (Nevada County, California)
- Alder Creek (Siskiyou County, California)
- Alder Creek (Saguache County, Colorado)
- Alder Creek (Beaver Kill), a stream in Ulster County, New York
- Alder Creek (Sanders County, Montana)
- Alder Gulch, Montana

== See also ==
- Alder Creek Grove
- Aliso Creek (disambiguation)
