= Dominique Raimbourg =

French politician

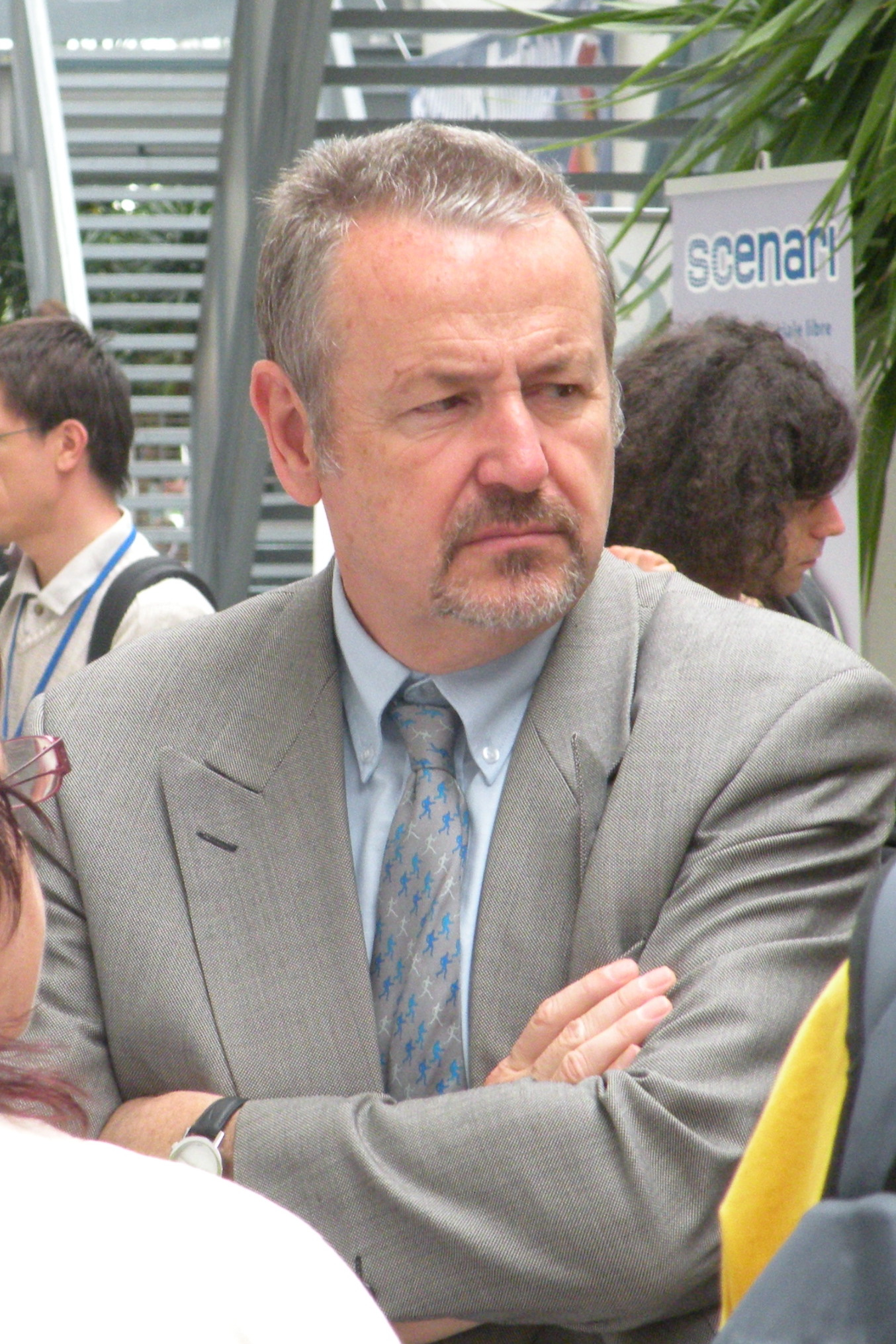
- Dominique Raimbourg during the RMLL 2009 in Nantes
- Parliamentary group: Socialist

Deputy for Loire-Atlantique's 4th constituency in the National Assembly of France
- In office 4 October 2001 – 18 June 2002
- Preceded by: Jacques Floch
- Succeeded by: Jacques Floch
- In office 20 June 2007 – 20 June 2017
- Preceded by: Jacques Floch
- Succeeded by: Aude Amadou

Personal details
- Born: 28 April 1950 (age 75) Boulogne-Billancourt (Hauts-de-Seine)

Dominique Raimbourg (born 28 April 1950) was a member of the National Assembly of France. He represented Loire-Atlantique's 4th constituency from 2001 to 2002 and again from 2007 to 2017, as a member of the Socialiste, radical, citoyen et divers gauche. He is the son of famous French actor Bourvil.
