= Conro =

Canadian DJ and record producer

- Also known as: Oncor
- Born: Conor Patton; June 13, 1990 (age 36); Saskatchewan, Canada
- Origin: Kelowna, British Columbia, Canada
- Genres: Future bass; future pop; electro house (previously)
- Occupations: DJ; record producer; singer
- Years active: 2012–present
- Labels: Armada; Revealed; WOLV; Monstercat; Kindergarten; Stmpd
- Website: conromusic.ca

Conor Patton (born June 13, 1990) better known by his stage name Conro, is a Canadian DJ and record producer, based in Kelowna, British Columbia. He is best known for his song "Therapy" with over 31 million streams on Spotify and as an artist of the Canadian record label Monstercat.

== Early life ==
Conro became interested in music production at a young age, as he took up piano, guitar, and the drums. He started playing the violins at the age of seven and later, joined rock n' roll and alternative bands. He lived in a trailer and worked as a security guard prior to his musical career.

== Career ==
=== 2012–2016 ===
In 2012, his debut song "Axiom" was released through the record label Kindergarten. The song was part of a two-track EP of the same title. His 2015 collaboration titled "Bittersweet" with Dyro and vocalist Envy Monroe, which was released through Hardwell's Revealed Recordings, became one of his most successful songs. In 2016, he released on Canadian record label Monstercat the singles "On My Way Up", "I Wanna Know " and "City Lights", the latter of which features vocalist Royal. "On My Way Up" has received over 3.3 million Spotify streams as of July 2017. He also released a single titled "The Saint" on Monstercat.

=== 2017–present ===
In March 2017, Conro released the single "Chardonnay" which features vocalist Karra. He also remixed the Martin Garrix song "Scared to Be Lonely".

On May 17, 2017, he released a single titled "Lay Low" on Monstercat. The song features vocalist David Benjamin, who met Conro at the Amsterdam Dance Event in 2016. Conro released a single titled "Close", which would be included as the second single in his debut EP, in July 2017.

On August 9, 2017, Conro released his debut EP titled Connecting the Dots, featuring 5 songs. On August 25, 2017, Conro collaborated with fellow future bass producers Anevo and Grant to release a single titled "Without You" on the Canadian record label Monstercat. The song, which features vocals by Victoria Zaro, was included on the Monstercat compilation album Monstercat Uncaged Vol. 2 alongside three songs from Conro's debut EP.

On June 30, 2017, he released on Martin Garrix's label Stmpd Rcrds, the song titled "Like You Love Me" as a collaboration with producer Disero and vocalist Alice France.

In the December 9 week for the Billboard Dance/Mix Show Airplay chart, Conro's song "Close" peaked at 31st.

On February 13, 2018, he released the first of 4 singles that would be included on his 2nd EP, "All Eyes On Me", titled Take Me There. This was followed by the releases of "Me" in March, "Fired Up" in June and "Trippin" in August. The EP came out in October 2018 through the Monstercat label.

In 2019 he released "Remember You" in May, "All I Want" in June, and his 3rd EP "Thrill of It" in July. He released a single "What's Love" in September 2019.

In November 2019, Conro posted on Instagram that he was in the process of recording vocals for a "new album". This was officially announced alongside the release of its first single, "Without Your Love" on January 24, 2020. Upon releasing the 2nd single, "Fighters", Conro announced the album would be titled "Level Days". In March, an unreleased song "Therapy" appeared in the opening credits of the video game Rocket League of which Conro had been featured before with "All Me" in 2017. "Therapy" was the official song of the 9th season of RLCS (Rocket League Champion Series). Later in March, the final single, "The Small Things", was released. "Level Days" was released on May 22, 2020 consisting of "Therapy" as well as 8 other songs. To close out 2020, Conro released the single "You Gotta Be" in collaboration with German singer LissA. It was a cover of Des'ree's song of the same name.

On January 8, 2021, Conro released "luv(drunk)" which included lyrics that refer to the COVID-19 pandemic and the subsequent quarantine. In May, Conro collaborated with fellow DJ Dyro on the single "Memory Bank" which has accumulated over 14 million Spotify streams as of July 2025.

After not releasing music for 7 months, Conro returned with the single "find u" on January 7, 2022. He released another single in February titled "feeling". In late March, "just wanna luv" was released with Conro himself stating it was his "favourite song". On May 20, 2022, Conro released the single "back2u". In August, Conro collaborated with American singer Aviella on the single "Way Back". His final single of 2022 "scars" was released in October.

On January 31, 2023, Conro released the first of 3 singles that would be included on his 4th EP, "Melodramatic", titled "Every Little Thing". In late March, the 2nd single "Tell Me" was released. On May 4, 2023, the final single from the EP, "Just Like You" came out and features Canadian rapper Boslen. In June, "Melodramatic" was released and included new songs including "Hypnotized", "My Girl" and "Backseat Lovers". On November 30, 2023, Conro released "Wastin Time".

Conro collaborated with Dutch singer Haris Alagic on "Nothin On You", released on April 4, 2024. The following month, he collaborated with duo Hollywood Principle on "Take Me Away". In June, "Perfect World", a collaboration with American musician and actress Marlhy Murphy released. It was written and dedicated to Conro's daughter, Violet, and would serve as the first single on his upcoming EP, Violet Sky. "Brighter Days", the 2nd single from the EP, released on August 8, 2024 and was a collaboration with American DJ Zack Martino. The 3rd and final single, "Somebody With You" came out on October 3, 2024 and was followed by the EP's release on October 17. In December 2024, Conro released a VIP remix of "Therapy". He was also featured on "Carry Me Through" from the Shallou EP '24, summer'.

2025 would see a stylistic switch for Conro as he would transition from electronic pop to chill house, starting with the release of "by myself", a 2 song EP. Along with this, he announced a new side project called 'oncor' where he planned to release his chill house music. In April, he released "where did you go", a 3 song EP on the 'oncor' project. On May 20, 2025, Conro released the single, "Let Go". In June 2025, Conro would release a 2 song EP titled "how can i be myself/closer". This was the 3rd EP of the oncor project and featured vocals from LissA on, "how can i be myself".

== Discography ==
=== Albums ===
Title	Details
Level Days	Released: May 22, 2020; Label: Monstercat; Format: Digital download

=== Extended plays ===
Title	Details
Connecting the Dots	Released: August 9, 2017; Label: Monstercat; Format: Digital download
All Eyes On Me	Released: October 12, 2018; Label: Monstercat; Format: Digital download
Thrill of It	Released: July 19, 2019; Label: Monstercat; Format: Digital download

=== Charted singles ===
Title	Year	Peak chart positions	Album
Title	Year	US Airplay	Album
"Close"	2017	17	Connecting the Dots
"Take Me There"	2018	12	All Eyes On Me
"Trippin"	2018	7	All Eyes On Me

=== Other singles ===
==== As lead artist ====
Title	Year	Album
"Axiom"	2012	Axiom EP
"The Hound" (with Sam O Neall)	2015	Non-album singles
"Bittersweet" (with Dyro featuring Envy Monroe)	2015	Non-album singles
"Nosehorn" (with Bali Bandits)	2015	Non-album singles
"On My Way Up"	2016	Non-album singles
"City Lights" (featuring Royal)	2016	Non-album singles
"The Saint"	2016	Non-album singles
"Unique" (with Headhunterz featuring Clara Mae)	2016	Non-album singles
"I Wanna Know"	2016	Non-album singles
"Chardonnay" (featuring Karra)	2017	Non-album singles
"Lay Low" (featuring David Benjamin)	2017	Connecting the Dots
"Like You Love Me" (with Disero featuring Alice France)	2017	Non-album single
"Without You" (with Grant and Anevo)	2017	Monstercat Uncaged Vol. 2
"Me"	2018	All Eyes On Me
"Fired Up"	2018	All Eyes On Me
"Remember You"	2019	Thrill of It
"All I Want"	2019	Thrill of It
"What's Love"	2019	Non-album single
"Without Your Love"	2020	Level Days
"Fighters"	2020	Level Days
"The Small Things"	2020	Level Days
"Memory Bank" (with Dyro)	2021	Non-album single
"just wanna luv"	2022	Non-album single

==== As featured artist ====
Title	Year
"Play It Cool" (Terry Zhong featuring Conro)	2019

=== Remixes ===
2014

- Popeska featuring Denny White – "Heart Of Glass" (Conro Remix)

2016

- Paris Blohm featuring Blondfire – "Something About You" (Conro Ultra Miami 2016 Remix)
- Fais featuring Afrojack – "Hey" (Conro Remix)
- Mr. Probz – "Fine Ass Mess" (Conro Remix)
- Justin Bieber – "As Long as You Love Me" (Conro Remix)

2017

- Martin Garrix and Dua Lipa – "Scared to Be Lonely" (Conro Remix)
- Martin Solveig – "Places" (Conro Remix)
- Youngr – Monsters (Conro Remix)
- Louis the Child featuring Elohim - "Love Is Alive" (Conro Remix)

=== Covers ===
2018

- Earth, Wind & Fire – "September"

==== 2020 ====
- Des'ree – You Gotta Be (with Lissa)
