= Trippin (Conro song) =

Single by Conro

from the album All Eyes On Me
- Released: August 17, 2018
- Genre: Pop
- Length: 3:32
- Label: Monstercat

Conro singles chronology
""Fired Up"" (2018)	"Trippin" (2018)	""All Eyes On Me"" (2018)

"Trippin" is a song by Canadian electronic music producer Conro. A single off his sophomore extended play All Eyes On Me, it was released via Canadian label Monstercat on August 17, 2018.

"Trippin" is the fifth song in Conro's sophomore extended play All Eyes On Me.

== Themes ==
"Trippin" is described by Conro as "about that high that you get when you meet someone you know is special and can't wait to see where the relationship goes."

== Reception ==
EDM.com described Conro's vocals as "catchy and just makes you want to dance", and compares the bass line to common night clubs. EDM Identity called it "the perfect track to vibe out to while driving around town and heading to the beach." Earmilk complimented the song's "groovy bass line and the snapping of fingers".

== Charts ==
Chart (2018)	Peak position
US Dance/Mix Show Airplay (Billboard)	7
