= Alda Garrido =

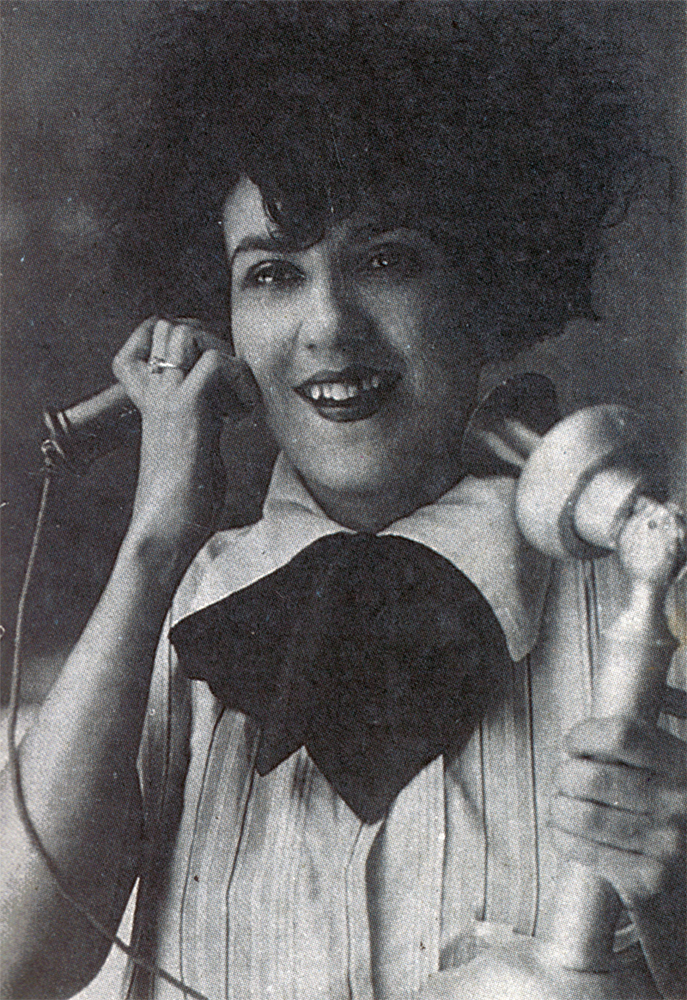
- Alda Garrido (1920)
- Born: August 18, 1896; São Paulo
- Died: December 8, 1970 (aged 74); Rio de Janeiro
- Other name: Alda Palm Garrido
- Occupation: Actress
- Known for: "Queen of the Actresses"

Alda Palm Garrido (São Paulo, August 18, 1896 – Rio de Janeiro, December 8, 1970) was a Brazilian vaudeville actress. A comedian, she played the title role in Pedro Bloch's production Dona Xepa and then repeated the performance in the film, adapted in 1959.

== Life and career ==
At the age of 19 Alda Garrido formed with her husband, actor Américo Garrido, the duo Dupla de Garridos, doing duets in São Paulo until 1920. They moved to the Rio de Janeiro and organized a theater company for Teatro América, debuting with Luar de Paquetá by Freire Jr. in 1924, remaining successfully in theaters for six months.

In 1923, the duo received an invitation to work with the entrepreneur Pascoal Segreto and his company, performing Ilha dos Amores, Quem Paga É o Coronel, both by Freire Jr., and Francesinha do Bataclan, by Gastão Tojeiro, among others. The season projected Alda Garrido in such a way that she was hired by vaudeville businessman Manoel Pinto, father of Walter Pinto, to work for Companhia Nacional de Revistas, at Teatro Recreio.

Alda's success in the genre makes her maintain a dual professional practice; on one side the usual comedies from her own production company, in which she works with her husband, on the other, the contracts with entrepreneurs in the vaudeville sector. But slowly, her company surrenders to the success of the musical theater, as in Brasil Pandeiro (1941), with text of her favorite author, Freire Jr. in partnership with Luiz Peixoto.

In 1939, entrepreneur Walter Pinto makes Garrido and Aracy Cortes, in the show Tem Marmelada, by Carlos Bittencourt and Cardoso de Meneses, to share the stage at Teatro Recreio for the last time. Among the most successful revues of her career are Maria Gasogênio, satire about the shortage of gasoline in the years of World War II, and Da Favela ao Catete, (1935) by Freire Jr. and Joubert de Carvalho. The actress creates a unique style of interpretation by transforming the text into improvisations that, according to Pedro Bloch, are in reality meticulously studied beforehand.

== Style ==
The 1950s enshrine Alda Garrido as Dona Xepa, a successful play (1953) by Pedro Bloch. The actress becomes the symbol of Brazilianness, as shown in the following excerpt from journalist Jota Efegê: "The market vendor Dona Xepa, right up to Alda Garridos's artistic invoice, gives rise to a spontaneous performance where her intuition prevails in the composition of the figure. Going beyond the script, Alda steps in with her precious collaboration and graft her insightful 'shards'."

Decio de Almeida Prado, theater critic, reveals: "[...] Properly, not even an actress she is. An actress is a professional specialized in not being the same person twice. Alda Garrido is none of this. Her theatrical technique in psychological characterization is the most precarious. On the other hand, she has something much rarer: a genuinely comical personality. When she performs, the comic part is never on the character, but on the artist, on what she possesses as unmistakably inimitable. What we most admire is not the play, but the very Alda Garrido, with her irreverence and madness, which allows her to always behave in a less conventional way and common sense, which makes her find the most disconcertingly prosaic answer in every situation. Alda Garrido is much more than an actress, she is a great eccentric person, like one of those comic cinema and theater American artists such as Groucho Marx, and Danny Kaye."

== Curiosities ==
- Alda debuts at Teatro Rival in 1912, with the play Das Cinco Às Sete, by Joracy Camargo, beside her husband Américo Garrido.
- In 1921, she starts her own theatrical company, eventually given the title "Queen of the Actresses" in 1928.
- In 1940, she makes her film debut in the movie E o Circo Chegou, directed by Luiz de Barros.
- In 1952, one of her plays is listed in The New York Times as one of the top ten hits of the year.
- In 1953, she acts in what would be her most famous role in Dona Xepa by Peter Bloch, a play staged over 500 times, later coming to television (1977) and cinema (1953).
- Alda abandons her career in 1965 with the play Entre Louras e Morenas.
- In 1970, she prepares her come back on Maria Fofoca but dies before the premiere, on December 8, 1970, in Rio de Janeiro.
