= Julie Laernoes =

French-Dutch politician

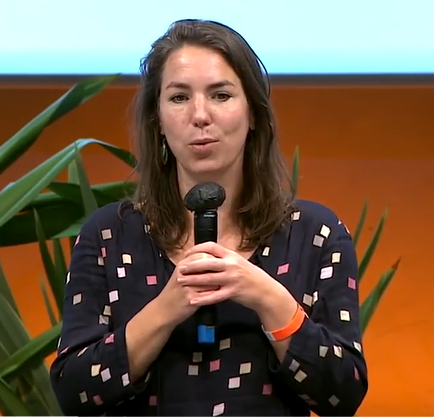
- Laernoes in 2021.

Member of the National Assembly for Loire-Atlantique's 4th constituency
- Incumbent
- Assumed office 22 June 2022
- Preceded by: Aude Amadou

Personal details
- Born: 3 July 1982 (age 43) Delft, Netherlands
- Party: EELV (2006–)
- Profession: Chief of staff, politician

Julie Laernoes (born July 3, 1982, in Delft, Netherlands) is a French-Dutch politician from Europe Ecology The Greens. She was elected as a deputy for Loire-Atlantique's 4th constituency in the 2022 French legislative election.

She took part in Dominique Voynet's presidential campaign for the French presidential election of 2007 and became her chief of staff when she became mayor of Montreuil in 2008. After moving to Nantes, she became Jean-Philippe Magnen's campaign manager during the 2010 French regional elections.

After the 2014 French municipal elections, Laernoes was then elected as a municipal councilor and became a Nantes Métropole's vice-president. In the 2020 one, she ran for mayor before joining the list of Johanna Rolland, the outgoing mayor, for the second round.

In the 2022 French legislative election, she ran with the support of the NUPES' alliance, and defeated incumbent La République en Marche MP Aude Amadou.

== See also ==
- List of deputies of the 16th National Assembly of France
