= Loire-Atlantique's 4th constituency =

Constituency of the National Assembly of France

4th constituency of Loire-Atlantique
- inline Constituency of the National Assembly of France

- Constituency in Department

- Location of Loire-Atlantique in France
- Deputy: Julie Laernoes; EELV
- Department: Loire-Atlantique
- Cantons: Bouaye, Nantes X, Rezé

The 4th constituency of Loire-Atlantique is a French legislative constituency in the Loire-Atlantique département. Like the other 576 French constituencies, it elects one MP using the two-round system, with a run-off if no candidate receives over 50% of the vote in the first round.

== Historic representation ==
Election	Member	Party
1988	Jacques Floch	PS
1993	Jacques Floch	PS
1997	Jacques Floch	PS
2001	Dominique Raimbourg (Note: Substitute for Jacques Floch, and replaced him while he was Secretary of State of Veterans)	PS
2002	Jacques Floch	PS
2007	Dominique Raimbourg	PS
2012	Dominique Raimbourg	PS
2017	Aude Amadou	LREM
2022	Julie Laernoes	EELV
2024	Julie Laernoes	EELV

== Election results ==
=== 2024 ===
Candidate	Party	Alliance	First round			Second round		
Candidate	Party	Alliance	Votes	%	+/–	Votes	%	+/–
Julie Laerneos	LE	NFP	30,619	46.83	+4.01	34,265	53.40	-4.63
Aude Amadou	REN	Ensemble	14,815	22.66	-6.69	16,225	25.29	-16.68
Gaëlle Pineau	RN		13,116	20.06	+9.85	13,678	21.32	new
Astrid Lusson	LR	UDC	5,450	8.34	+2.56			
Stéphane Pellegrini	LO		788	1.21	+0.24			
François Olléon	ECO		593	0.91	new			
Mattis Gauvin	EXG		0	0.00	new			
Votes			65,381	100.00		64,168	100.00	
Valid votes			65,381	97.89	-0.36	64,168	97.51	+2.50
Blank votes			984	1.47	+0.26	1,216	1.85	-1.60
Null votes			423	0.63	+0.10	421	0.64	-0.90
Turnout			66,788	71.64	+19.92	65,805	70.56	+19.20
Abstentions			26,440	28.36	-19.92	27,453	29.44	-19.20
Registered voters			93,228			93,281		
Result			LE HOLD					

=== 2022 ===
Legislative Election 2022: Loire-Atlantique's 4th constituency
Party	Candidate	Votes	%	±%
EELV (NUPÉS)	Julie Laernoes	20,291	42.82	+3.08
LREM (Ensemble)	Aude Amadou	13,908	29.35	-9.85
RN	Gaëlle Pineau	4,838	10.21	+4.60
LR (UDC)	Sophie Pavageau	2,737	5.78	−2.84
FGR	Bruno Chavalier	2,202	4.65	N/A
REC	Yohan Buteau	1,180	2.49	N/A
Others	N/A	2,236	4.72	
Turnout		47,392	51.72	−2.29
2nd round result
EELV (NUPÉS)	Julie Laernoes	26,411	58.03	+14.96
LREM (Ensemble)	Aude Amadou	19,105	41.97	−14.96
Turnout		45,516	51.36	+6.16
EELV gain from LREM				

=== 2017 ===
Candidate	Label	First round		Second round	
Candidate	Label	Votes	%	Votes	%
Aude Amadou	REM	18,577	39.20	21,179	56.93
Vincent Egron	FI	8,238	17.38	16,025	43.07
Dominique Raimbourg	PS	7,751	16.35		
Isabelle Merand	UDI	4,085	8.62		
Alain Avello	FN	2,657	5.61		
François Nicolas	ECO	2,307	4.87		
Élodie Calonne	DLF	646	1.36		
Lilian Scales	ECO	638	1.35		
Mireille Pernot	PCF	539	1.14		
Amélie Barrely	REG	329	0.69		
Bernard Rineau	DVD	292	0.62		
Marie Cram	DIV	265	0.56		
Paul Raynaud	EXG	235	0.50		
André Koriat	DIV	219	0.46		
Nassira Semsar Behague	PRG	190	0.40		
Jean-Noël Rebora	DVG	185	0.39		
Maud Legeay	DIV	174	0.37		
Samuel Magaud	EXG	66	0.14		
Votes		47,393	100.00	37,204	100.00
Valid votes		47,393	98.58	37,204	92.48
Blank votes		471	0.98	2,211	5.50
Null votes		211	0.44	815	2.03
Turnout		48,075	54.01	40,230	45.20
Abstentions		40,943	45.99	48,774	54.80
Registered voters		89,018		89,004	
Source: Ministry of the Interior

=== 2012 ===
2012 legislative election in Loire-Atlantique's 4th constituency
Candidate	Party	First round	
Candidate	Party	Votes	%
Dominique Raimbourg	PS	27,581	55.35%
Isabelle Merand Gauthier	PR	9,858	19.78%
Sylvie Carayol	FN	4,026	8.08%
Mireille Pernot	FG	3,231	6.48%
Didier Queraud	EELV dissident	1,626	3.26%
Danielle Vilvoisin	MPF	1,281	2.57%
Yann Quemeneur	UDB	1,128	2.26%
Lilian Scales	??	698	1.40%
Paul Raynaud	LO	251	0.50%
Samuel Magaud	Communistes	147	0.30%
Valid votes		49,827	98.54%
Spoilt and null votes		736	1.46%
Votes cast / turnout		50,563	61.05%
Abstentions		32,254	38.95%
Registered voters		82,817	100.00%

=== 2007 ===
Legislative Election 2007: Loire-Atlantique's 4th constituency
Party	Candidate	Votes	%	±%
PS	Dominique Raimbourg	21,976	44.42	
UMP	Christine Thebaudeau	12,615	25.50	
MoDem	Yves Aumon	5,676	11.47	
LV	Catherine Esnee	2,417	4.89	
MPF	Catherine Beaulieu	1,528	3.09	
Far left	Pierre Chauvin	1,266	2.56	
PCF	Yann Vince	1,075	2.17	
Others	N/A	2,915		
Turnout		50,157	62.97	
2nd round result
PS	Dominique Raimbourg	29,978	64.49	
UMP	Christine Thebaudeau	16,506	35.51	
Turnout		47,489	59.62	
PS hold				

=== 2002 ===
Legislative Election 2002: Loire-Atlantique's 4th constituency
Party	Candidate	Votes	%	±%
PS	Jacques Floch	21,327	43.82	
UDF	Claude Gobin	16,104	33.08	
FN	Fabienne Bar	2,512	5.16	
LV	Marie-Christine Planer	2,071	4.25	
MPF	Herve Beaulieu	1,803	3.70	
PCF	Yann Vince	972	2.00	
Others	N/A	3,886		
Turnout		49,514	66.76	
2nd round result
PS	Jacques Floch	25,274	57.52	
UDF	Claude Gobin	18,665	42.48	
Turnout		45,044	60.73	
PS hold				

=== 1997 ===
Legislative Election 1997: Loire-Atlantique's 4th constituency
Party	Candidate	Votes	%	±%
PS	Jacques Floch	19,135	42.64	
UDF	Stephan Urbanczyk	10,144	22.61	
FN	Michel Boju	3,892	8.67	
PCF	Jacques Guilbaud	3,364	7.50	
DVD	Danièle Vilvoisin	2,099	4.68	
LO	Robert Cerisier	1,746	3.89	
Far left	Aline Chitelman	1,431	3.19	
GE	Patrick Da Silva	1,413	3.15	
Others	N/A	1,650		
Turnout		47,202	67.79	
2nd round result
PS	Jacques Floch	28,389	63.46	
UDF	Stephan Urbanczyk	16,347	36.54	
Turnout		47,290	67.92	
PS hold				

== References and Sources ==
- Official results of French elections from 1998: "Résultats électoraux officiels en France" (in French). Archived from the original on 20 December 2011.
