= Alder Creek (Saguache County, Colorado) =

Stream in Mississippi, USA

Alder Creek Tributary to San Luis Creek
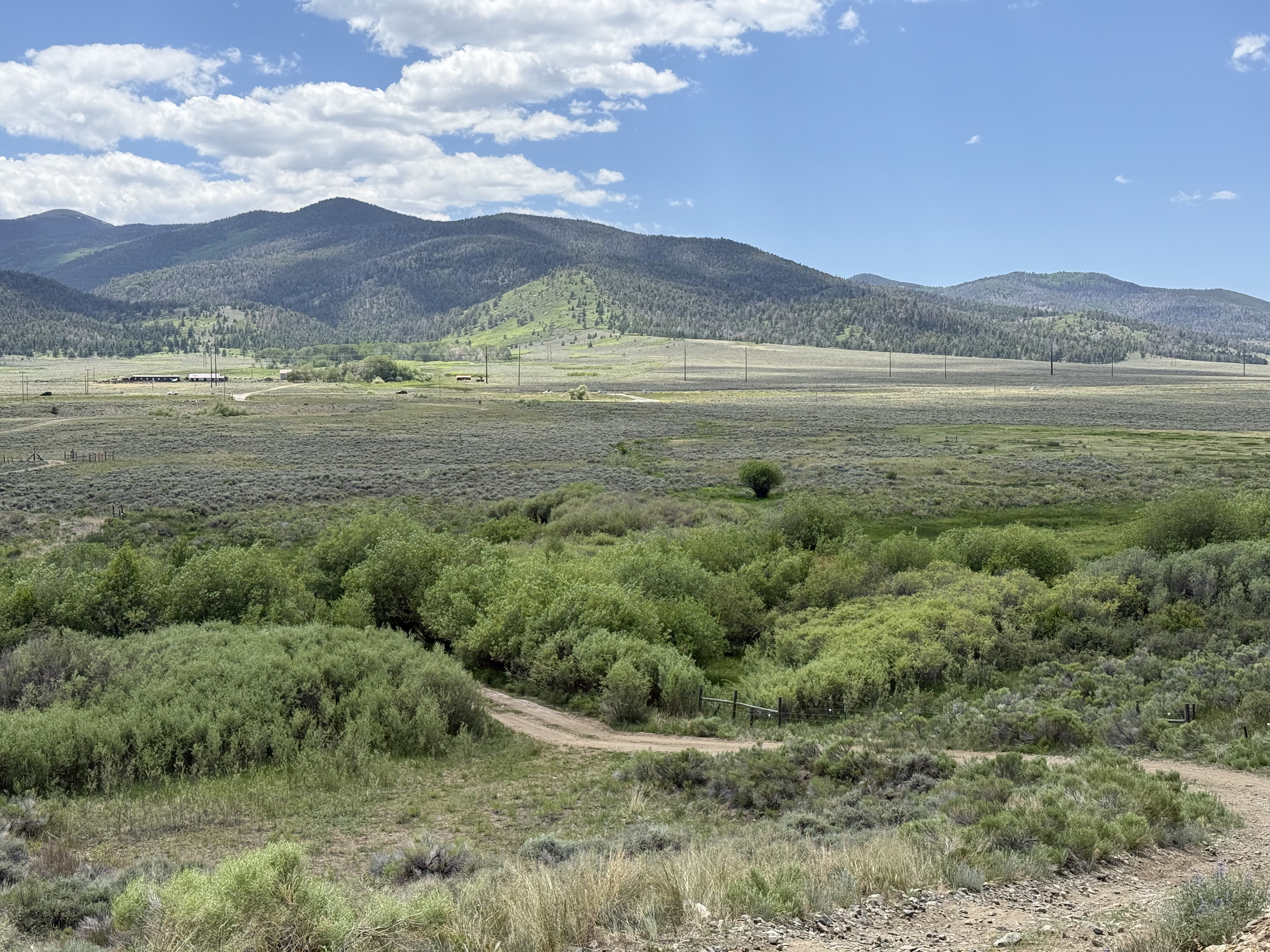
- Looking over Alder Creek, crossed by a dirt road.

- Location of Alder Creek mouth Alder Creek (Saguache County, Colorado) (the United States)

Location
- Country: United States
- State: Colorado
- County: Saguache

Physical characteristics
- Source: Bear Creek divide
  - location: about 0.5 miles east of Round Mountain
  - coordinates: 38°20′03″N 106°06′03″W
  - elevation: 11,080 ft (3,380 m)
- Mouth: San Luis Creek
  - location: about 0.5 miles east of Alder, Colorado
  - coordinates: 38°22′18″N 106°01′55″W
  - elevation: 8,448 ft (2,575 m)
- Length: 5.06 mi (8.14 km)
- Basin size: 5.00 square miles (12.9 km^{2})
- Discharge
  - location: San Luis Creek
  - average: 0.80 cu ft/s (0.023 m^{3}/s) at mouth with San Luis Creek

Basin features
- Progression: San Luis Creek
- River system: San Luis Creek
- Tributaries
  - left: unnamed tributaries
  - right: unnamed tributaries
- Bridges: US 285, County Road UU5

Alder Creek is a stream entirely within Saguache County, Colorado.

Alder Creek was named for the alder trees lining its course.

== See also ==
- List of rivers of Colorado
