= Pedro Bloch =

Brazilian writer (1914–2004)

Pedro Bloch (1914, Ukraine – February 23, 2004, Brazil) was a Brazilian writer. His family immigrated to Brazil at the beginning of the 20th century.

He is famous for his plays, such as Dona Xepa and Mãos de Eurídice. Also, he wrote more than a hundred books, one of which is Pai, me compra um amigo? Many of those books were inspired by his experiences taking care of children. His collections of children's sayings and anecdotes are quite renowned.

Bloch was a musician, a playwright, and a physician; he had been a member of the Brazilian National Faculty of Medicine since 1937.

His most renowned play was As Mãos de Eurídice, which debuted on May 13, 1950 and which went on to be performed more than 60,000 times in more than 45 countries. Two years later, he created another success, Dona Xepa, which was even turned into a soap opera on the Rede Globo network. Pedro Bloch's interest in theater stemmed from the actors who used to visit him.

Pedro Bloch died at the age of 89 of respiratory insufficiency in his apartment in Copacabana. His grave is in the Cemitério Communal Israelita in Rio de Janeiro.

He was cousin of media tycoon Adolpho Bloch.

== Example text ==
A little girl was talking with her teacher. Her teacher said that it impossible for a whale to eat a human being as even though this is a very big mammal, its throat is small. The little girl claimed that Jonas was eaten by a whale. Mad, the teacher repeated that a whale could not eat a single human being; it was physically impossible. Then, then little girl said:

- "When I die and go to heaven, I'll ask him."

Her teacher asked her:

- "And what if it turns out that Jonas is in hell?"

The little girl answered:

- "Then it will be you who will ask him."

== Bibliography ==
- Dicionário de Anedotas
- Você que falar melhor?
- Samba No Pé
- Teco-Teco
- Um pai de verdade
- Mãe, cadê meu pai?
- O menino que inventou a verdade
