= Dwarf alder =

Dwarf alder may refer to various plants:

- Rhamnus alnifolia, native to North America
- Alnus alnobetula subsp. fruticosa
- Fothergilla major

== Similar names ==
- Dwarf elder
