= Alda Township, Hall County, Nebraska =

Coordinates: 40.829°N 98.439°W

Alda Township is a township in Hall County, Nebraska, in the United States.

== History ==
It was organized in 1881.
