= Aude Amadou =

French politician of Renaissance (born 1980)

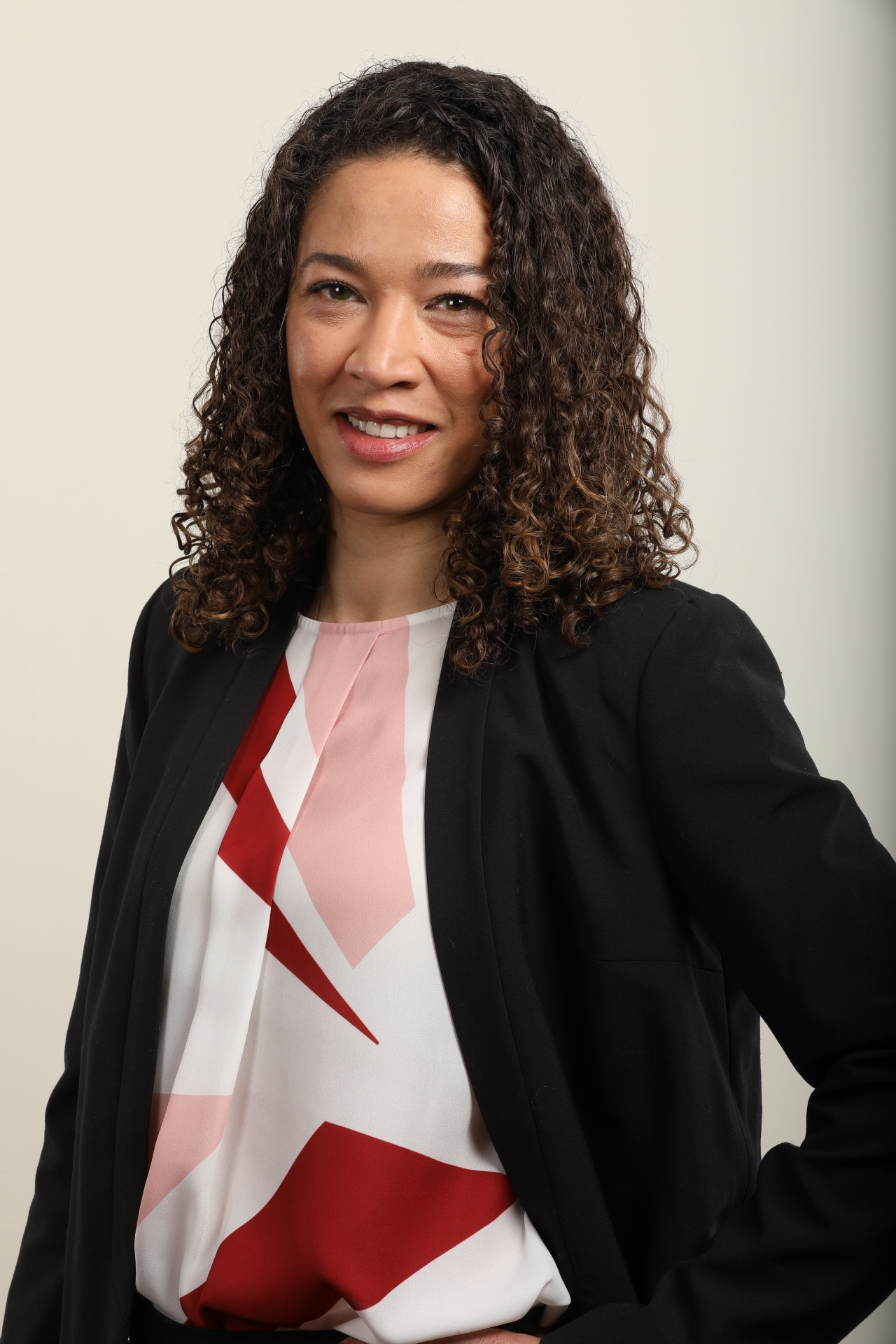

Member of the National Assembly for Loire-Atlantique's 4th constituency
- In office 21 June 2017 – 21 June 2022
- Preceded by: Dominique Raimbourg
- Succeeded by: Julie Laernoes

Personal details
- Born: 29 February 1980 (age 46) Coutances, France
- Party: Renaissance

Aude Amadou (French pronunciation: [od amadu]; born 29 February 1980) is a French politician of Renaissance (RE) who served as the member of the French National Assembly from 2017 to 2022, representing the 4th constituency of the department of Loire-Atlantique.

== Early life and career ==
A former professional handball player, Aude was frequently the captain of her teams in Nice and Toulun Saint-Syr, where she played division 1 and 2 handball.

She played handball for 17 years. First in the team of CJF Fleury-les-Aubrais (Loiret), then as a professional player in D1 and D2, in the clubs of Toulon Saint-Cyr Var and OGC Nice (Alpes-Maritimes); she plays the position of center-half, and is often the captain of the team. In 2017, she plays in the amateur club N2 of Moncoutant (Deux-Sèvres).

== Political career ==
In parliament, Amadou serves as member of the Committee on Foreign Affairs. In addition to her committee assignments, she is a member of the French delegation to the Assemblée parlementaire de la Francophonie (APF).

She lost her seat in the second round of the 2022 French legislative election to Julie Laernoes from EELV.

== Political positions ==
In July 2019, Amadou voted in favour of the French ratification of the European Union’s Comprehensive Economic and Trade Agreement (CETA) with Canada.

== See also ==
- 2017 French legislative election
