= ALDA Events =

ALDA
- Type: Private
- Industry: Concert tours, event production, festivals
- Founded: 2007
- Headquarters: Netherlands, Germany
- Website: http://www.aldaevents.com

ALDA is a global operating Dutch producer, concept developer and promoter of international DJ and event concepts. ALDA stands for the first two initials of the names of both entrepreneurs; Allan and David. ALDA was founded in 2007 and is based in Amsterdam.

ALDA produces international in- and outdoor events such as festivals, stadium shows and world tours. ALDA-produced events include Armin Only (Imagine, Mirage and Intense), I AM Hardwell, A State Of Trance, Electronic Family, A Day at the Park and AMF (Amsterdam Music Festival) (with ID&T, two days in 2015 during the AMF, five days the following year). These events accommodate over 100,000 fans worldwide every year.

== History ==
Allan Hardenberg and David Lewis have been active in the Dutch dance scene since its very beginning. In 1997, the two entrepreneurs organized events such as Armin Only, Tiësto Solo and "Three DJs in a Boat". Seven years after they started their collaboration, Armin van Buuren, Maykel Piron and David Lewis founded Armada. With this company, Armin Only became more successful and new concepts as Armada Night, A State of Trance and Famous were developed.

Hardenberg and Lewis decided to start their own independent event agency and founded ALDA. It originated in 2007 and has since then been operating from Amsterdam. Early years were Armin Only, Best Of Both Worlds and A Day at the Park. Eventually, the event portfolio would extend with events like Electronic Family, Citymoves, various Armada concepts and other event nights during Amsterdam Dance Event (ADE).

In 2011 and 2013 ALDA was nominated for the International Dance Music Awards (IDMA) in the category Best Event Promoter Worldwide. Besides that, the A State of Trance concept has won various awards throughout the years. On November 25, 2014 it was announced that SFX Entertainment has acquired 50% of ALDA Holding BV. ALDA will keep operating as an independent company and will continue to develop internationally.

Since 2015 ALDA has continued its expansion across several countries. At the end of 2015 ALDA announced that it had opened a second location in Hong Kong. One year later, ALDA Germany opened the doors of its new office in Hamburg. Here, the company engaged in a collaboration with CTS Eventim, with plans to take the electronic dance music scene in Germany to the next level. In 2017, this collaboration resulted in a brand new event called New Horizons.

Right after this successful partnership, a new collaboration began at the end of 2018 with Insomniac (promoter) (part of Live Nation Entertainment). Pasqualle Rotella (CEO) operates as event organizer within the United States. Through this collaboration, worldwide coverage is created for ALDA and Insomniac, with support from the partners and local promoters. Both parties see the advantages of the collaboration, which has made it possible for them to extend their reach worldwide and follow their growth ambitions.

== Paul van Dyk injury incident ==
In the February 2016 A State of Trance event, due to poor safety measures, Paul van Dyk fell through an opening on the stage and suffered severe injuries, including injuries to his spine and brain, which resulted in a long recovery and in him missing performances for many months.

In January 2019, van Dyk was awarded $12 million in damages against ALDA. The high court of the Netherlands deemed that ALDA had not designed the stage to be safe to stand on, nor had they warned van Dyk that part of the stage was unstable.

On February 29, 2024, van Dyk disclosed on social media that the fall had resulted in him suffering from life long consequences and he is still not well. He also stated that even despite the courts recognizing the fault of ALDA, he still had not been compensated and neither had he received an apology from ALDA.

In responses, ALDA stated that the matter was in the hands of their attorneys and insurance companies

== Events and concepts ==
ALDA organizes over 130 shows in more than 33 countries.

=== Current ===
Current concepts ALDA is working on (in alphabetical order) are:

- A Day at the Park (2008 – present)
- A State of Trance (2008 – present)
- Electronic Family (2011 – present)
- New Horizons (2017–present)
- SAGA Festival Romania (2021–present)
- The Flying Dutch (2015–present)
- We Are Connected (2016–present)

=== Events at Amsterdam Dance Event ===
Events during Amsterdam Dance Event (in alphabetical order):

- AMF (2013 – present)
- Armada Night (2003 – 2014)
- Axwell Λ Ingrosso (2015 - 2016)
- Dyro & Bassjackers Present X Tour (2014)
- Hardwell Presents Revealed (2012 – 2016)
- Sander van Doorn presents: DOORN label night (2012 - 2013)
- Sexy By Nature (2013 – 2015, 2017)
- Sunnery James & Ryan Marciano: Exposed by ADE events (2019)
- Slam! MixMarathon (2016 – 2017)
- Tiësto presents Clublife 500 (2016)

=== Past ===
Events ALDA organized in the past (in alphabetical order) are:

- Armada @ The Beach (2007–2008)
- Armin Only (2008-2014, 2017)
  - Armin Only: Imagine (2008)
  - Armin Only: Mirage (2010–2011)
  - Armin Only: Intense (2013–2014)
  - The Best of Armin Only (2017)
- Armin van Buuren presents Kingsday Leiden (2015 - 2016)
- Beachfreaks (2008)
- Best Of Both Worlds (2007–2011)
- Citymoves (2008–2014)
- Essence Festival (2008)
- Famous (2008–2009)
- I AM Hardwell (2013–2014)
- I AM Hardwell - United We Are (2015 - 2016)
- Intuition Events (2008–2010)
- Kingsland Festival (2013 – 2015)
- Life In Color Turkey (2016)
- Sexy By Nature (2014 - 2015)
- Spinnin' Sessions (2015 - 2016)
- Top 100 DJs (2014 - 2015)
- Utopia Island (2017)
- WetNation (2017)

== Awards and nominations ==
Year	Award	Nominated work	Category	Result
2011	International; Dance Music Awards	ALDA Events	Best Event Promoter; Worldwide	Nominated
2013	International; Dance Music Awards	ALDA Events	Best Event Promoter; Worldwide	Nominated
2016	Dutch Live Entertainment Production Awards (DLEPA)	The Flying Dutch	Production of the Year	Won

== See also ==
- List of electronic music festivals
- SFX Entertainment
