= Iron (Nicky Romero and Calvin Harris song) =

Promotional single by Nicky Romero and Calvin Harris
- Released: 10 September 2012
- Recorded: 2012
- Length: 5:02 (original mix); 3:39 (album version)
- Label: Protocol
- Songwriters: Nick Rotteveel; Adam Wiles
- Producers: Nicky Romero; Calvin Harris

"Iron" is a song by Nicky Romero and Calvin Harris. The song was released as a single, via Beatport. It became the second single to be released through Romero's label Protocol Recordings (after "WTF!?" with ZROQ), and the first single from the label to reach number-one on Beatport. A shortened version of the song was later included on Harris' third studio album, 18 Months (2012).

== Composition ==
The majority of the song has an upbeat electro house style until vocals from Harris come in. When the vocals do come in, the background tune is just a piano being played until Calvin Harris sings "Our hearts will never be the same again". After this happens, the song becomes upbeat again, but more aggressive.

== Track listing ==
Digital download – single
No.	Title	Length
1.	"Iron" (Original Mix)	5:02

Digital download – remixes
No.	Title	Length
1.	"Iron" (Dyro Remix)	5:27
2.	"Iron" (Tony Romera Remix)	7:23

== Credits and personnel ==
- Nicky Romero – production, arrangement, all instruments
- Calvin Harris – production, arrangement, vocals

== Certifications ==
Region	Certification	Certified units/sales
Netherlands (NVPI)	Gold	10,000^{^}
^{^} Shipments figures based on certification alone.

== Release history ==
Region	Date	Label	Format(s)
Various	10 September 2012	Protocol	Digital download
Various	8 October 2012	Protocol	Digital download (Remixes)
