= Alda Lazo =

Peruvian politician (born 1949)

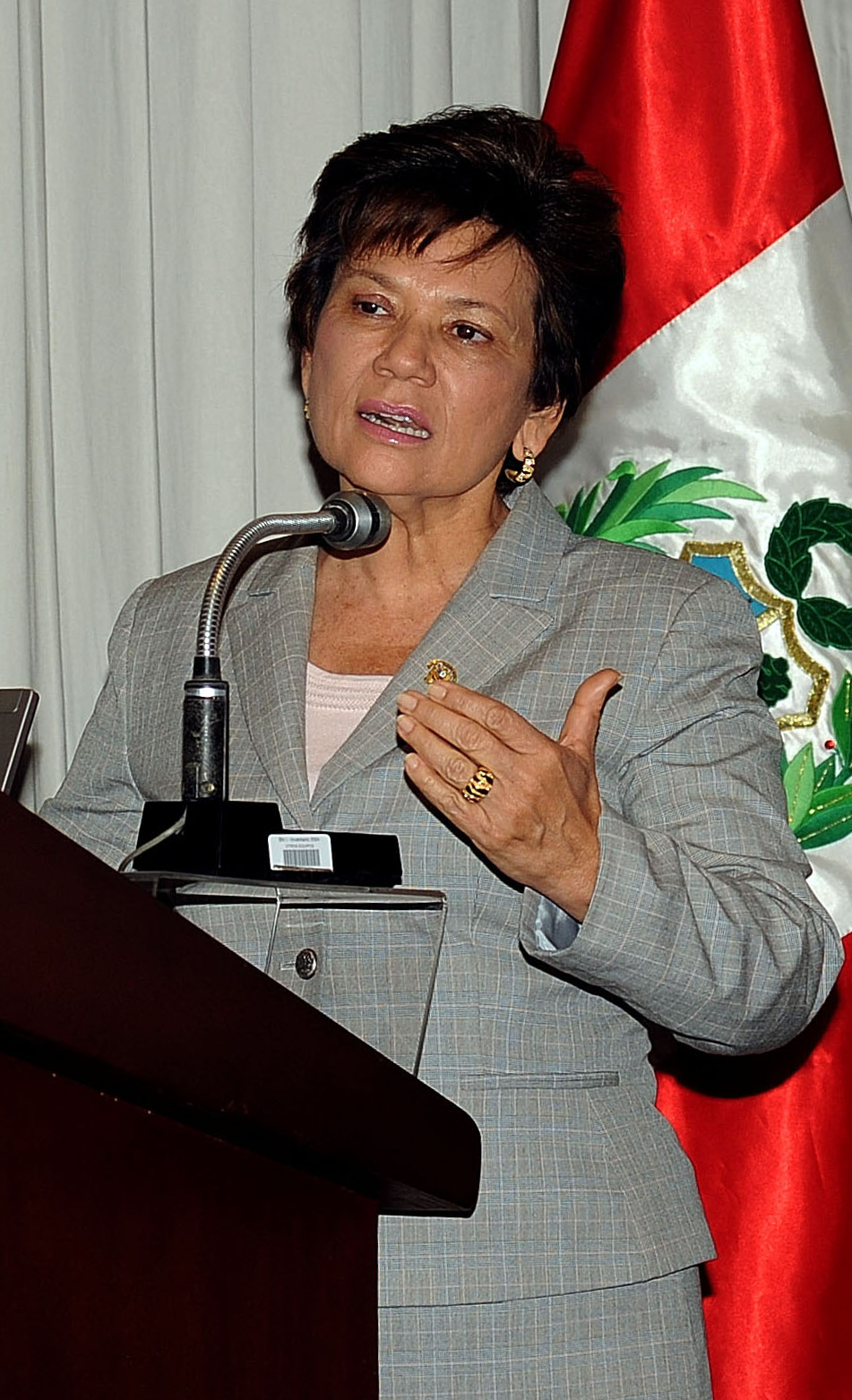

Member of Congress
- In office 26 July 2006 – 26 July 2011
- Constituency: Lima

Personal details
- Born: 17 June 1949 (age 75); Piura, Peru
- Political party: National Restoration Party
- Occupation: Politician

Alda Mirta Lazo Ríos de Hornung (born 17 June 1949) is a Peruvian politician and a former Congresswoman, elected in the 2006 elections, representing Lima for the 2006–2011 term. Lazo belongs to the National Restoration Party. Lazo lost her seat in the 2011 elections when she ran for re-election under the National Solidarity Alliance.
