= Alder Creek (Siskiyou County, California) =

- Location in California

Location
- Country: United States
- State: California
- Region: Siskiyou County, California

Physical characteristics
- Source
  - coordinates: 41.5011111°N 122.0094444°W
- Mouth
  - coordinates: 41.5423754°N 122.0622293°W

Alder Creek is a river located in Siskiyou County, California. It is a tributary of the Butte Creek, which flows into the Klamath river.
