= Fred Alder =

Australian rules footballer

Personal information
- Full name: Frederick Alder
- Born: 21 June 1889; Horsham, Victoria
- Died: 13 February 1960 (aged 70); Balwyn, Victoria
- Original team: Glenhuntly

Playing career^{1}
Years	Club	Games (Goals)
1909	Richmond	1 (1)
- ^{1} Playing statistics correct to the end of 1909.

Frederick Alder (21 June 1889 – 13 February 1960) was an Australian rules footballer who played with Richmond in the Victorian Football League (VFL).
