= Henry Alder =

Australian rules footballer

Personal information
- Full name: Henry Hall Alder
- Born: 6 April 1874; Brunswick, Victoria
- Died: 17 May 1949 (aged 75); Coburg, Victoria
- Original team: Beverley

Playing career^{1}
Years	Club	Games (Goals)
1902	Fitzroy	1 (0)
- ^{1} Playing statistics correct to the end of 1902.

Henry Hall Alder (6 April 1874 – 17 May 1949) was an Australian rules footballer who played one game with Fitzroy in the Victorian Football League (VFL) in 1902.
