= Aldobrandesca =

Italian saint, mystic and nurse

Saint Aldobrandesca
- Born: 1249; Siena, Italy
- Died: 1309; Italy
- Venerated in: Roman Catholicism
- Feast: April 26

Aldobrandesca (also known as Alda) (c. 1249, Siena, Italy – c. 1309) was an Italian saint and mystic. A short description of her life was published in 1584, which was later translated into Latin and published in the Acta Sanctorum.

Aldobrandesca was "a matron of good standing"; when she was a young woman, her parents arranged a marriage for her, which she reluctantly agreed to and she grew to love her husband. After seven years, she was widowed but had no children, so she chose to remain celibate and dedicate herself to prayer. She retired to a small house outside Siena, where she participated in almsgiving and mortification. She wore a hair shirt "to fight persistent sexual temptations" and erotic memories about her husband, although according to her biographer, the temptations did not end. She had many visions about the life of Christ.

Aldobrandesca eventually gave away all her possessions, moved into a hospital, and devoted herself to serving prostitutes, the ill, and the poor. Rebecca McCarthy includes a short description of Aldobrandesca in her book about the history of the Magdalene Laundries and their "work done to reform prostitutes in late-Middle-Ages Italy" who "represented a private spiritual calling rather than a municipal or community endeavor". Some of its members practiced asceticism and were flagellants, and "felt one of their important charitable duties was to reform prostitutes".

She continued to have visions and ecstasies; a story is told about when she was discovered by a nurse while in a trance that looked like catalepsy. The nurse, thinking that Aldobrandesca had died, called other members of the staff, some of which were amazed and some of which were amused and scoffed her; they pinched her, pierced her with needles, and burnt her with lighted candles. When she recovered consciousness, she was injured from their abuse, but she told them, "God forgive you", and it never happened again. Loyola Press goes on to state, "That act of forgiveness tells us more about Aldobrandesca than all of her paranormal experiences. Visions and ecstasies may be evidence of a supernatural touch, but mercy expressed to others is a sure sign of divine love. We honor Aldobrandesca as a saint for her charity, not for her trances".

Loyola Press reports several miracles attributed to Aldobranesca. She healed a boy who was in pain throughout his body by making the sign of the cross over him. She healed a girl whose face was so puffed up that one of her eyes was entirely closed and a woman seriously ill from breast cancer in the same way. She healed another woman with breast cancer, whose doctor recommended surgery, but Aldobranesca reached the woman first and healed her by anointing her with oil and also making the sign of the cross over her; the woman's tumor disappeared.

Before Aldobranesca died, she "won the veneration of all, and many were the cures attributed to her ministrations". Loyola Press reports that Aldobranesca was "a popular curiosity" in Siena because of her miracles, visions, and ecstasies and that she performed charitable deeds until the day she died on April 26, 1309. According to hagiographer Alban Butler, her tomb was at one time "a great centre of devotion" at Saint Thomas Church in Siena. Aldobranesca's feast day is April 26.

== Works cited ==
- Butler, Alban (1990). Thurston, Herbert J.; Attwater, Donald (eds.). Butler's Lives of the Saints. Westminster, Maryland: Christian Classics. pp. 166–167. ISBN 0 87061 0457.
