= Aude Banasiak =

French footballer (born 1975)

Personal information
- Date of birth: 8 October 1975 (age 51)
- Place of birth: Reims, France
- Position: Midfielder

Senior career*
Years	Team	Apps	(Gls)
1992–1994	Stade Reims		
1994–2000	Saint-Memmie Olympique		
2000–2003	Paris SG		

International career
1997	France	4	(0)
- * Club domestic league appearances and goals

Aude Banasiak (born 8 October 1975) is a French former professional women's football player.

She won the Division 2 Féminine twice; in 1999 with Saint-Memmie and 2001 with PSG.
