= Rhondda Alder Kelly =

- Born: 24 April 1926
- Died: 5 April 2014 (aged 87)
- Known for: Miss Australia, 1946

Rhondda Alder Kelly (24 April 1926 – 5 April 2014) is a Queensland and Australian Beauty-Queen Title Holder. She won the title of Miss Australia Tuesday 18 December 1945 and was known as Miss Australia 1946 .

== Biography ==
Rhondda Kelly was born in the family home in Hendra, Brisbane, Queensland, Australia on 24 April 1926. From a young age, she took art of speech lessons and after winning the Miss Australia Contest she was a radio announcer for 4BC in Brisbane. She regularly performed in shows at the Twelfth Night Theatre holding leading roles in singing, and performing. Her favourite role was when she played Anna in The King and I.

Kelly also completed a physiotherapy degree at the University of Queensland. She married Noel John Keith Ullman (A Civil Engineer) on 4 June 1949. They had four children: Ross, Ken, Geoff and John.

== Miss Australia ==
Prior being formally run by the Spastic Welfare League, The Miss Australia Quest was a contest and fund raising event for various charities. In 1946, moneys raised went to support the return Services League (RSL).
