= Connecting the Dots (EP) =

EP by Conro
- Released: August 9, 2017
- Genre: Future bass
- Length: 17:22
- Label: Monstercat

Singles from Connecting the Dots
- 1. "Lay Low" Released: May 17, 2017; 2. "Close" Released: July 19, 2017; 3. "Circus" Released: August 9, 2017

Connecting the Dots is an EP recorded by Canadian DJ and producer, Conro. Featuring five songs, it was released through Canadian record label Monstercat on August 9, 2017. It features collaborators such as Beckii Power, David Benjamin and Disero.

== Background ==
The title represents an idea that Conro attempts to 'connect the dots' of many different sub-genres of electronic dance music. The lead single "Close" was described as a "lush" future bass track, which "blurs the line" between pop and future bass, consisting of big room build-ups and drops and "Circus", the second track on the EP, was compared to Odesza's musical style and described as having "syncopated, rubbery synth riff with pitched vocals". The third song "Remedy" was described as a "genre-bending masterpiece"; the fourth "Lay Low", a collaboration with David Benjamin is a tropical house track and the fifth song "Love Divine" was described as having strong synths. Conro stated "I redefined my passion for music and decided to write something different."

== Track listing ==
No.	Title	Length
1.	"Close"	3:04
2.	"Circus" (featuring Beckii Power)	3:34
3.	"Remedy"	3:09
4.	"Lay Low" (featuring David Benjamin)	3:26
5.	"Love Divine" (with Disero featuring Alice Berg)	3:07
Total length:		17:22

== Charts ==
Title	US Airplay
"Close"	17
