= Dyro =

Dutch DJ and record producer (born 1992)

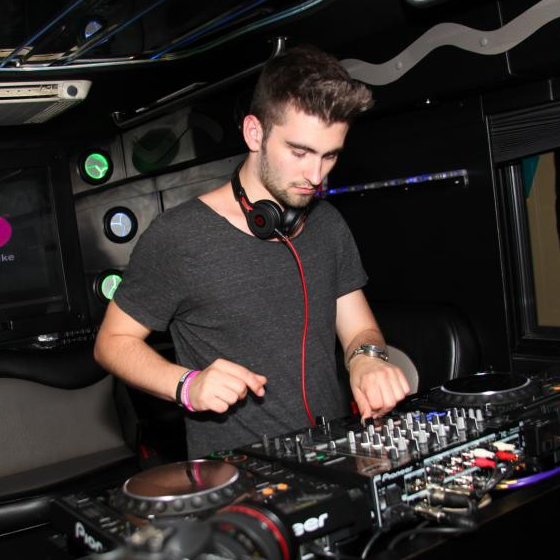
- Dyro in March 2013

Background information
- Born: Jordy van Egmond; 22 April 1992 (age 34); Leiden, South Holland, Netherlands
- Genres: Complextro; trap; drum and bass; electro; drumstep; bass house; Dutch house; EDM
- Occupations: Music producer, DJ
- Instrument: FL Studio
- Years active: 2010–present
- Labels: WOLV; Revealed; Musical Freedom; Spinnin'; Capitol; Def Jam; RAM; Monstercat; Strictly Rhythm; Wall; STMPD; Mixmash
- Website: dyro.nl

Jordy van Egmond (Dutch pronunciation: [ˈjɔrdi vɑn ˈɛxmɔnt]; born 22 April 1992), known professionally as Dyro (/ˈdaɪroʊ/ DY-roh), is a Dutch DJ and EDM producer. Since 2010 he has released original singles and remixes on labels such as Revealed Recordings, Musical Freedom, and Def Jam, and has also released official remixes for tracks such as "Right Now" by Rihanna and "Iron" by Nicky Romero and Calvin Harris. He collaborated with Tiësto on a single titled "Paradise" in 2013, and also that year he collaborated with Hardwell on the single "Never Say Goodbye". Featuring Bright Lights, it peaked at No. 23 on the UK Dance Chart. In 2014 Dyro ranked No. 27 on the DJ Mag Top 100 DJs list.

Dyro has undertaken a number of international tours since signing to Revealed Recordings in 2011, performing at festivals such as Electric Zoo in 2013 and 2014, Barbarella in 2014, and Future Music Festival in 2014. In 2014 Dyro founded the independent record label WOLV Records, which releases both his own material and that of other "up and coming" artists. After hosting the radio show Daftastitc Radio since around 2013, Dyro currently hosts WOLV Radio with Dyro, which broadcasts on around 30 FM stations.

== Music career ==
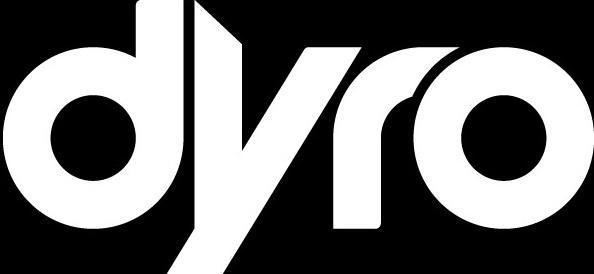
Dyro logo

=== Early life and first releases ===
He started learning FL Studio and making music in his bedroom under the name Dyro. After being discovered by Laidback Luke on a forum, Dyro was one of the first artists signed to Revealed Recordings, which had been founded by Dutch DJ Hardwell in 2010. Revealed released Dyro's single "Daftastic" in 2011, and around that time Dyro also released singles on labels such as Mixmash Records, Spinnin' Records, and Strictly Rhythm. In 2012 he collaborated with Dannic on mixing The Sound of Revealed 2012 compilation album. Also in 2012 Dyro's track "Top of the World" was released on Afrojack's Wall Recordings label, with Afrojack mixing the track into a number of live sets.

=== Early touring and radio shows (2013–2014) ===
While beginning to tour and perform, Dyro continued to study engineering at college, and would fly home to take part in exams. He started 2013 by joining Hardwell and Dannic on the "Hardwell presents Revealed: Canadian Bus Tour," performing twelve dates at Canadian clubs such as The Guvernment in Toronto. Dyro and Dannic also joined Hardwell on the Revealed North American Tour in the summer of 2013. While touring Dyro continued to produce original tracks and remixes, and the June 2013 album Hardwell presents 'Revealed Volume 4' features two of his songs. Among other remixes, Dyro's remix of the Wilkinson song "Afterglow" was officially released in October 2013. His collaborative track with Hardwell titled "Never Say Goodbye" peaked at No. 23 on the UK Dance Chart in 2013.

He collaborated with Tiësto on a single titled "Paradise" in 2013, which was included on Tieëto's compilation Club Life: Volume Three Stockholm. In 2013, Dyro was featured in Episode 310: Special Dyro on Tiësto's Club Life on Radio 538 in the Netherlands. He also mixed a session with Dannic for the Mixmag Mix lab series, and in late 2013, Dyro and Dannic co-hosted a night of the Amsterdam Dance Event at Jimmy Woo. The performance combined Dannic's and Dyro's radio shows and featured Tiësto and Hardwell as guests. He entered the DJ Mag Top 100 DJs chart in 2013 at No. 30, which was the highest new entry slot of the year. In 2015, Dyro released a new track with Conro and singer Envy Monroe on Revealed Recordings called "Bittersweet".

=== WOLV releases and singles (2014–2017) ===
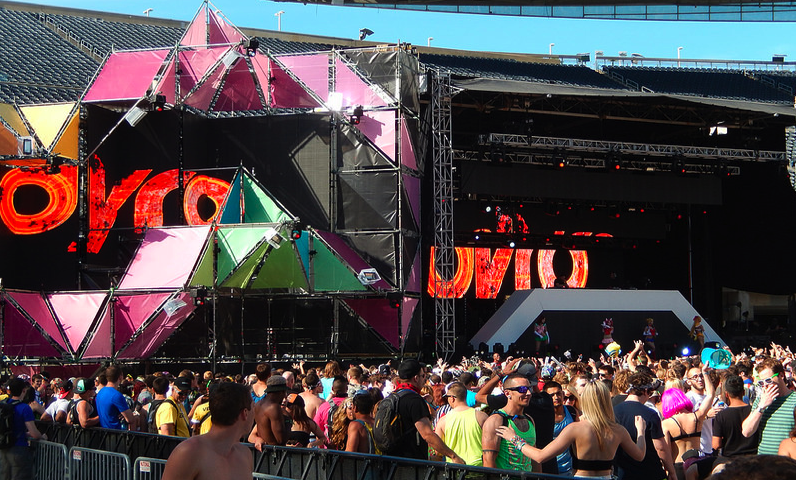
Dyro's stage setup during a performance on 14 June 2014 at Spring Awakening in Chicago.

External videos
- Dyro live at Tomorrowland 2014 (hour-long set)

Since 2012, a number of Dyro's tracks have charted on Beatport, and his 2014 track "Calling Out" with Ryder reached the Beatport Top 10. In early 2014, Dyro supported the release of his track "Black Smoke" with a solo tour, before joining the Future Music Festival tour across Australia. He then performed at Ultra Music Festival in Miami, and in April 2014 he embarked on another Revealed bus tour with Dannic and Hardwell, this time traveling across the United States.

In August 2014 Dyro founded his own independent record label WOLV Records. The first release on the label was a Dyro single titled "Wolv". Well received by Complex, Magnetic Magazine dubbed the track "precision-cut, mechanically-engineered... industrial electro... though Dyro does add a touch of humanity with a subtle instrumental melody." Billboard described it as "a dynamic production that combines big room, electro and (believe it or not) acid techno influences." Dyro's third release on the label came out in October 2014. Titled "Against All Odds," it featured MC Dynamite.

Starting in October 2014 Dyro co-headlined the Dyro & Bassjackers Present X Tour, which had a featured event at Amsterdam Dance Event on 15 October. The thirty-date tour ended on 15 December 2014, which was the night Dyro and Bassjackers also released their collaborative track "X" on WOLV Records. Alongside Dannic and Martin Garrix, Dyro was a key speaker at Kickstart Your Career and The New Breed panels at the Amsterdam Dance Event in 2014. In 2014, Dyro ranked No. 27 on DJ Mag's top 100 Best DJs list.

In 2014 and 2015 he headlined venues such as LIV in Miami and Ministry of Sound in London, and in 2014 he held a residency at The Light in Las Vegas and Space in Ibiza. In 2014 and 2015, he also performed main-stage at festivals such as Dance Valley, Electric Zoo, TomorrowWorld, Spring Awakening in Chicago, Creamfields in the UK and EDC Las Vegas. After two years of hosting his own Daftastic radio station, Dyro currently hosts the WOLV Radio with Dyro, which is broadcast on Bigfish Radio in the Philippines. as well as on around 30 FM stations worldwide.

== WOLV Records ==
In the summer of 2014 Dyro founded the independent record label WOLV, which releases both his own material and that of other "up and coming" artists. According to Dyro about his reasons for founding the label, "So when I first started out I got a lot of opportunities and a lot of people supported me and granted I could do whatever. First example Hardwell. I was allowed to do whatever I want on this label so that gave me a really creative-like environment to work in and develop myself. I want give back to young artists and upcoming DJs, and I want spot them myself and do what other people have done for me. Wolv should be like a platform for both established artists but also upcoming artists who help and develop themselves." Artists as of 2018 included Dyro, Dynamite MC, Bali Bandits, Bassjackers, Loopers, Naten, Conro, Sam O Neall, JuicyTrax, Switch Off, D.O.D, Joe Louis, Row Rocka, Prism, Jaycen A'mour, Funkz, Goja, NDS, Sam Lamar, Crossnaders and Bloqshot.

== Awards and nominations ==
Year	Award	Nominee	Category	Result
2013	DJ Magazine; Awards	Dyro	Top 100 DJs	30
2014	DJ Magazine; Awards	Dyro	Top 100 DJs	27
2015	DJ Magazine; Awards	Dyro	Top 100 DJs	27
2016	DJ Magazine; Awards	Dyro	Top 100 DJs	93
