= Alder, Colorado =

Ghost town in Saguache County, Colorado, United States

- Ghost town
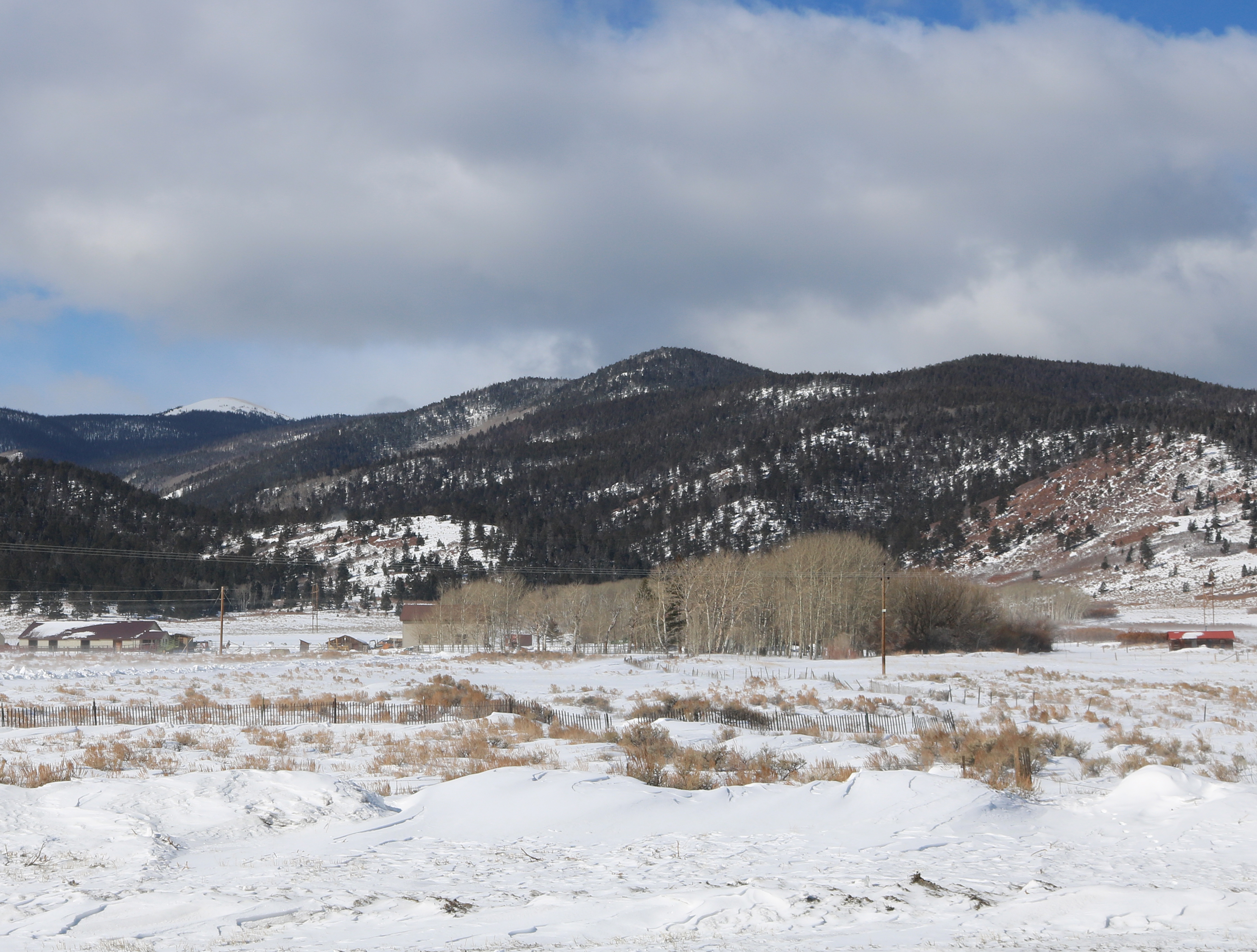
- Alder in winter

- Location of Alder, Colorado. Alder (Colorado)
- Coordinates: 38°22′10″N 106°02′22″W
- Country: United States
- State: Colorado
- County: Saguache

Government
  - Body: Saguache County
- Elevation: 8,544 ft (2,604 m)
- Time zone: UTC−07:00 (MST)
  - Summer (DST): UTC−06:00 (MDT)
- GNIS town ID: 189960

Alder is an extinct town located in Saguache County, Colorado, United States.

== History ==
The Alder post office operated from August 29, 1881, until November 30, 1927. The community takes its name from nearby Alder Creek.

== See also ==
- List of ghost towns in Colorado
