= Alda (name) =

Alda is both a surname and a given name. Notable people with the name include:

== Surname ==
- Alan Alda (born 1936), American actor, best known for his portrayal of Hawkeye Pierce in TV show M*A*S*H
- Antony Alda (1956–2009), American actor, son of Robert Alda, half brother of Alan Alda
- Arlene Alda, photographer, musician, author; wife of Alan Alda
- Beatrice Alda (born 1961), American actress, daughter of Alan and Arlene
- Elizabeth Alda (born 1960), American actress, daughter of Alan and Arlene
- Frances Alda (1879–1952), New Zealand-born, Australian-raised operatic soprano
- Julio Ruiz de Alda (1897–1936), Spanish aviator and politician
- Robert Alda (1914–1986), American actor, singer and dancer, father of Alan and Antony Alda
- Rutanya Alda (born 1942), Latvian-American actress

== Given name ==
- Alda of Alania, 11th-century Alan princess
- Aldobrandesca (or Saint Alda) (c. 1249–c. 1309), Italian Christian saint and nurse
- Alda Alves de Melo dos Santos, politician from São Tomé and Príncipe
- Alda Bandeira (born 1949), politician from São Tomé and Príncipe
- Alda Facio (born 1948), Costa Rican jurist, writer and teacher
- Dada Gallotti (born 1935), Italian actress born Alda Gallotti
- Alda Garrido (1896–1970), Brazilian vaudeville actress
- Alda Grimaldi (1919–2023), Italian director and actress
- Alda Lara (1930–1962), Portuguese writer
- Alda Lazo (born 1949), Peruvian politician
- Alda Merini (1931–2009), Italian writer
- Alda Neves da Graça do Espírito Santo (1926–2010), poet and government minister from São Tomé and Príncipe
- Alda Noni (1916–2011), Italian soprano
- Alda Ólafsdóttir (born 1966), Icelandic singer known simply as Alda
- Alda Wilson (1910–1996), Canadian sprinter

== See also ==
- Aldo (given name)
