= San Luis Creek (Colorado) =

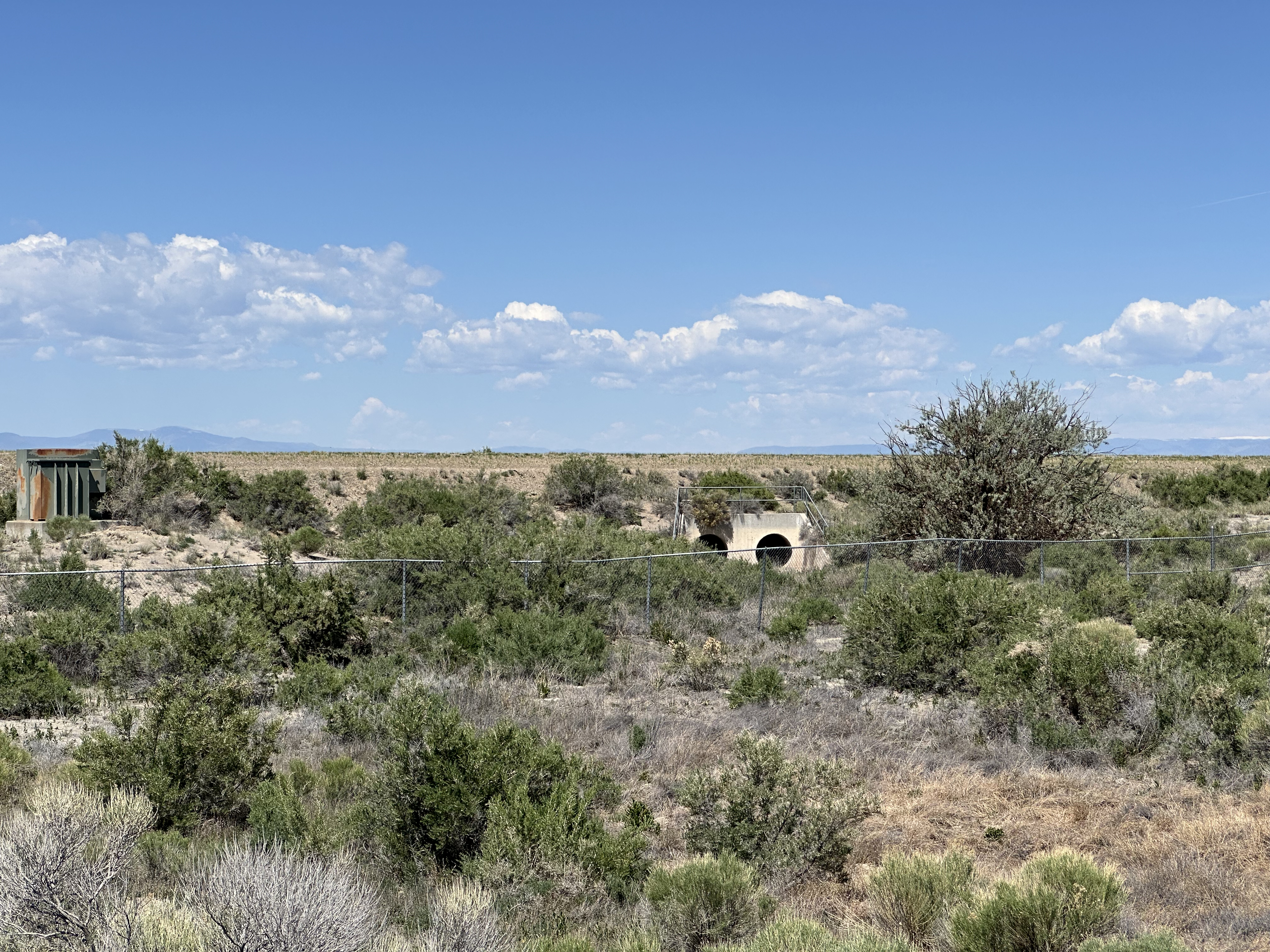
- Former ingress of San Luis Creek in to San Luis Lake

Physical characteristics
- Source
  - coordinates: 38°26′55″N 106°01′42″W
- Mouth
  - location: San Luis Lake
  - coordinates: 37°40′16″N 105°43′59″W
  - elevation: 7,526 ft (2,294 m)
- Basin size: 2,703 sq mi (7,000 km^{2})

San Luis Creek is a 76-mile-long (122 km) stream that flows from a source near Poncha Pass in Saguache County, Colorado to San Luis Lake adjacent to Great Sand Dunes National Park. San Luis Lake is the sink of the San Luis Closed Basin, the largest endorheic basin in Colorado.

== See also ==
- List of rivers of Colorado
