= Amsterdam Dance Event =

Five-day electronic music festival held annually in October

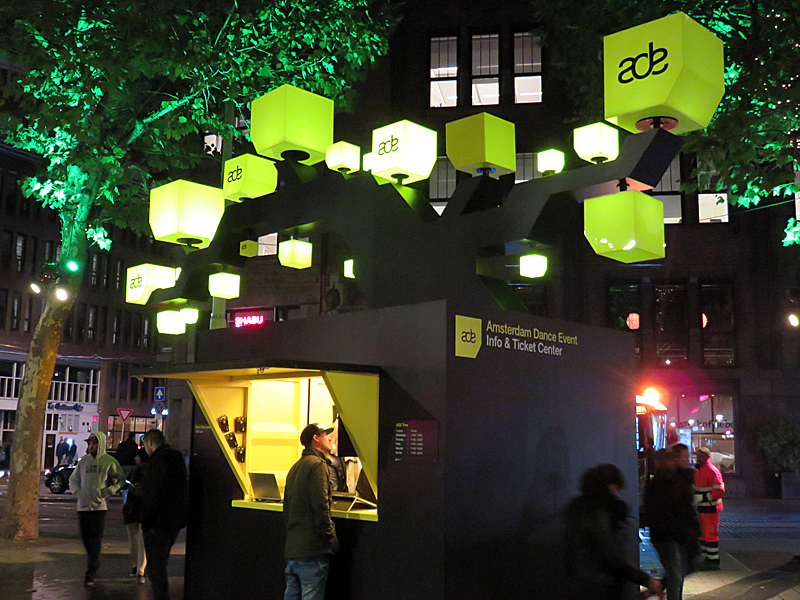
- Information stand for the Amsterdam Dance Event (ADE) 2016 on Rembrandt Square in Amsterdam.
- Genre: Electronic music
- Dates: Mid-October
- Location: Amsterdam
- Years active: 1996–present
- Founders: The Amsterdam Dance Event Foundation
- Most recent: 21–25 October 2026
- Previous event: 22-26 October 2025
- Next event: 20-24 October 2027
- Website: Official website

The Amsterdam Dance Event (ADE) is a five-day electronic music conference and festival held annually in mid-October. The event, organised by The Amsterdam Dance Event Foundation, offers a full programme of daytime conferences at ADE Pro, ADE Tech, ADE University, ADE Beamlab, ADE Green, ADE Sound Lab and ADE Beats alongside the ADE By Day festival programme and the nighttime ADE Festival, which features over 1,000 events and 2,500 artists over five days in 200 clubs and venues. The most notable event is the Amsterdam Music Festival (AMF) in the Johan Cruyff Arena on Saturday night.

ADE attracts over 500,000 people from all over the world to the city, making Amsterdam one of the busiest clubbing cities in the world. The event starts off on Wednesday with the daytime conferences and the extensive festival (day and night) programme and ends on Monday morning.

== History ==
Started in 1996 as a three-day conference and attended by 300 delegates with thirty DJs performing, the ADE was initially based in De Balie for the daytime conference and at night featured shows in three venues: Paradiso, Melkweg and Club Escape.

== Programme ==
Trailer for Amsterdam Dance Event 2013.

The four day ADE conference programme is based around the DeLaMar Theater (ADE Pro, ADE Green and ADE TECH), De Brakke Grond & Compagnietheater (ADE Sound Lab & Beam Lab) and Generator Hostel (ADE University). ADE also opens its doors to non-professional musicians with ADE Sound Lab, where aspiring artists and producers are invited to meet some of the world's most popular and in-demand artists, DJs and producers face-to-face in order to get expert opinions on their work. The event's latest initiative is ADE by Day, which started in 2011 (then named: ADE Playground) as a new technology showcase, but since 2012 features around 50 events, surprise daytime appearances by top DJs, art exhibitions and performances, special product lines, film screenings, as well as discounts in shops and bars.

In 2012 it was also announced that ADE would officially go from a four-day event to five days due to the rapidly growing number of 'afters' events on Sunday.

The day and nighttime line-up features over 2,500 artists as well as a selection of upcoming local and international talent, playing to a total of more than 400,000 clubbers and music enthusiasts in venues all over the city.

== See also ==
- List of electronic music festivals
