= Waldorf-Astoria Cigar Company =

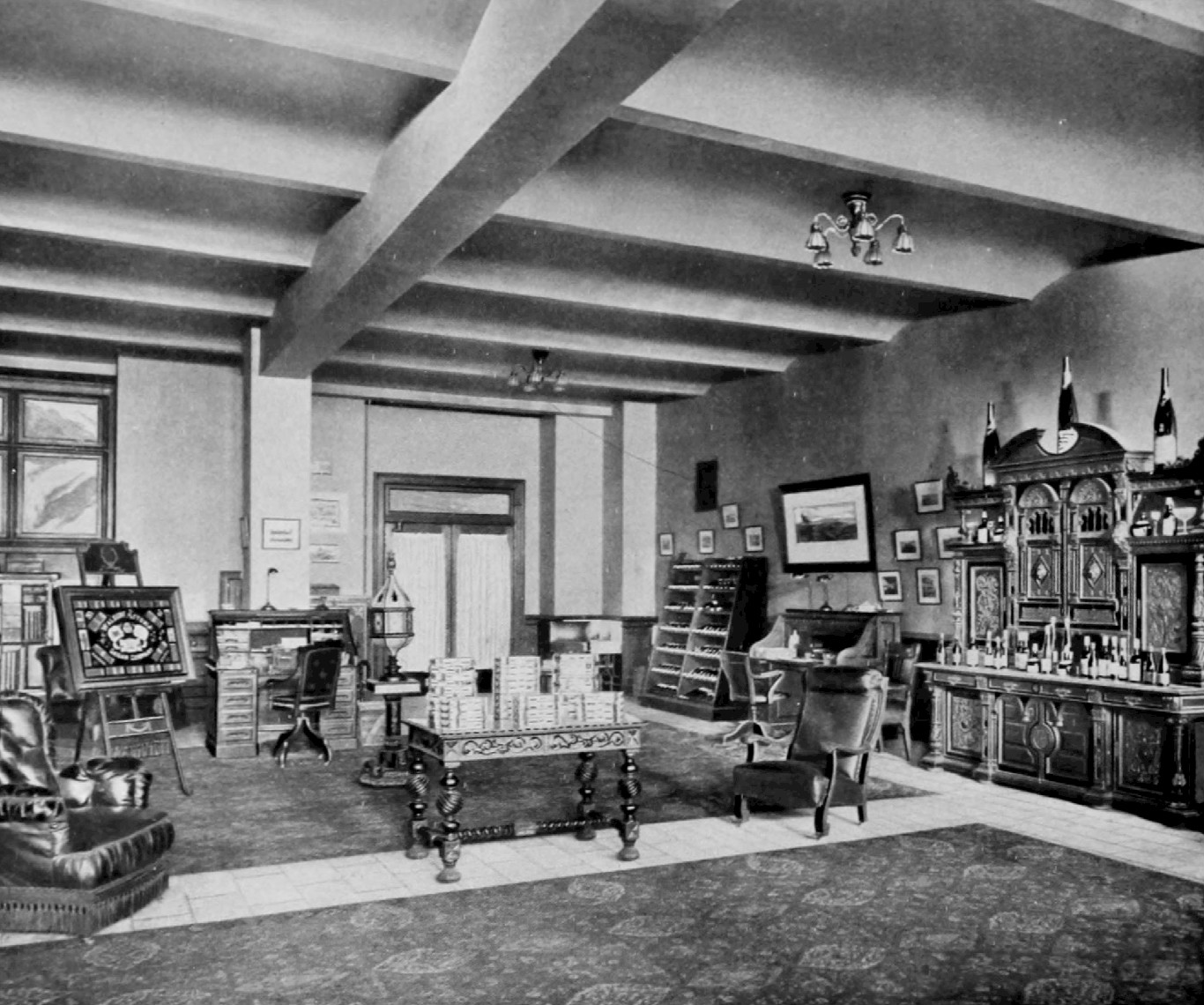
- Waldorf Astoria Cigar Company
- Trade name: Waldorf-Astoria Segar Company
- Industry: Tobacco
- Headquarters: Manhattan, New York City, United States
- Key people: George Boldt (president and director); Mervyn J. Buckley (secretary); Harry Rothschild (treasurer)
- Parent: Waldorf–Astoria Hotel

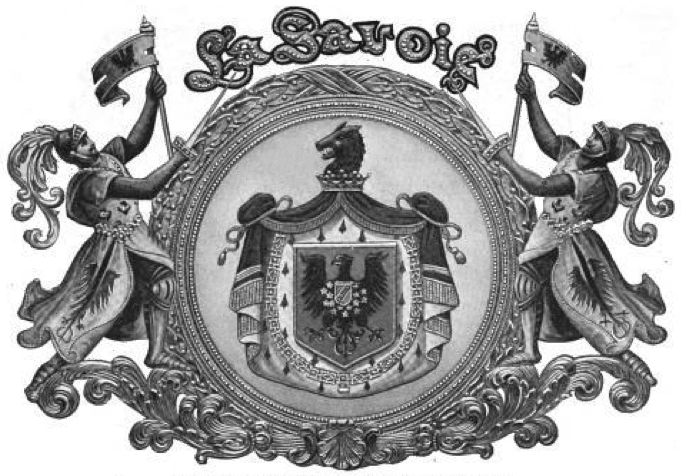
"La Savoie", imported Cuban cigars. Copyrighted and registered by the Waldorf-Astoria Cigar Company. (1905)

Waldorf-Astoria Cigar Company (also Waldorf-Astoria Segar Company) was the cigar company of the original Waldorf–Astoria Hotel in Manhattan, New York City. Its headquarters were located in the building's basement on the Fifth Avenue. The humidors were situated in a lower basement, as was the company's Cuban cigar stock. Its value was estimated between US$300,000-$400,000. Waldorf-Astoria Cigar Company and its contemporaries, such A. Schulte and Robert E. Lane, grew out of the local competition caused by the large volume of sales and uniform business methods of the United Cigar Stores. Life Magazine advertised that the first shipment of the LA SAVOIE brand of Havana cigars ever made to the US was made to the Waldorf-Astoria Cigar Company.

== Notable people ==
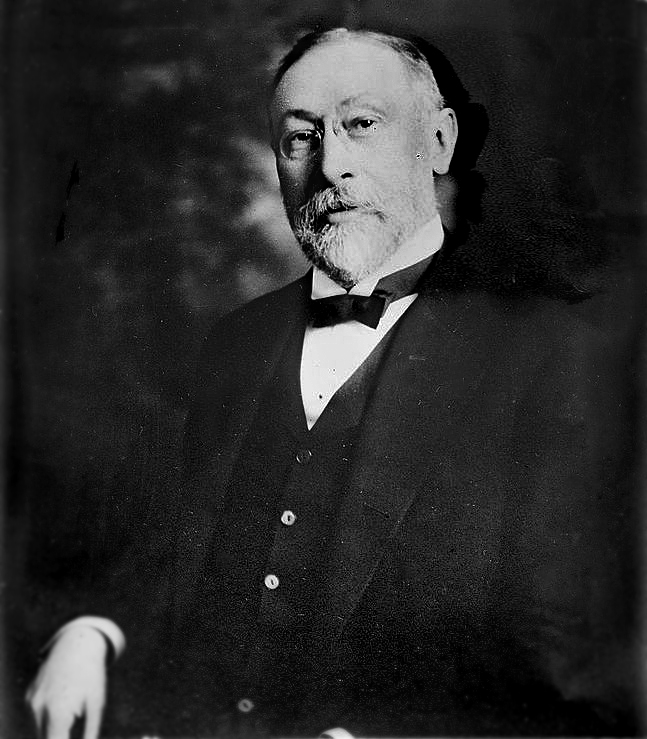
George Boldt

George Boldt served as president and director of the Waldorf-Astoria Segar Company, as well as the Waldorf Astoria Hotel Company and the Waldorf Importation Company. Mervyn J. Buckley was secretary of the company. Harry Rothschild of Rothschild Brothers served as the treasurer. Mr. Lehman was manager of the Pacific Coast branch of the Waldorf-Astoria Segar Company in San Francisco, California.

== La Magnita ==
The "La Magnita" case was a litigation in the New York Supreme Court, between Abraham Siegel, as plaintiff, and the Waldorf-Astoria Segar Company, as defendant. It was started by a motion for a preliminary injunction, in which Siegel claimed to be the owner of the trademark "La Magnita" for cigars, by reason of his having adopted the same in the year 1900. The defendant showed that while it was true such adoption and first use was made by Siegel, it was in such a moderate manner at the time, that no reputation had attached to it, indicating Siegel as the origin of the goods bearing that trademark, and that it was not until the Waldorf-Astoria Segar Company took a transfer from Siegel, not in writing, however, adopted a new label, largely advertised and pushed the goods, supervised its manufacture and the purchase of tobacco used in the manufacture, and generally promoted the same, that any reputation whatsoever attached to it, and at the time of the commencement of the suit, the entire reputation and good-will, connected therewith, indicated to the public, origin with the Waldorf-Astoria Segar Co., and not otherwise. Shortly before the case was reached for trial, the parties were brought together by counsel, and an adjustment of the conflicting collateral claims to the ownership of the mark was reached, Siegel withdrawing his claim to the ownership of the mark, and assigning whatever interest he had in the mark, to the Waldorf-Astoria Segar Co., which then entrenched itself in the ownership of the trademark. The case was very novel in its legal aspects, insofar as Siegel originally adopted the mark, but did not develop it to any extent, when the Waldorf-Astoria Segar Co. stepped in, took hold of it, and through its efforts and under an original label bearing its own name, but the old title, gave whatever value there was to the trademark, and established it thoroughly on the market. The Waldorf-Astoria Segar Co. continued to have the goods manufactured by Siegel as long as he was able to make the goods, but when his health broke down, and he requested them to secure another factory to make the cigars, it did so. Subsequently, Siegel made certain demands for monetary settlements to complete the transaction, which were eventually resolved. The new Congressional act has had its effect in increasing the interest in trademarks.

== Bibliography ==
- Bureau (1911). The Philippine Agricultural Review. Vol. 3 (Public domain ed.). Bureau of Agriculture, Department of Agriculture and Natural Resources.
- The Business World Company (1906). The Business World. New York: Kittredge Company.
- Leonard, John W. (1908). Who's who in Pennsylvania: A Biographical Dictionary of Contemporaries (Public domain ed.). L. R. Hammersly. p. 81.
- Life Magazine (1905). Life (Public domain ed.). Life magazine, Incorporated.
- Sparling, Samuel Edwin (1919). Introduction to Business Organization (Public domain ed.). Macmillan.
- United States Tobacco Journal (1909). United States Tobacco Journal. BMT Publications.
