= George Charles Boldt Jr. =

American businessman (1879–1958)

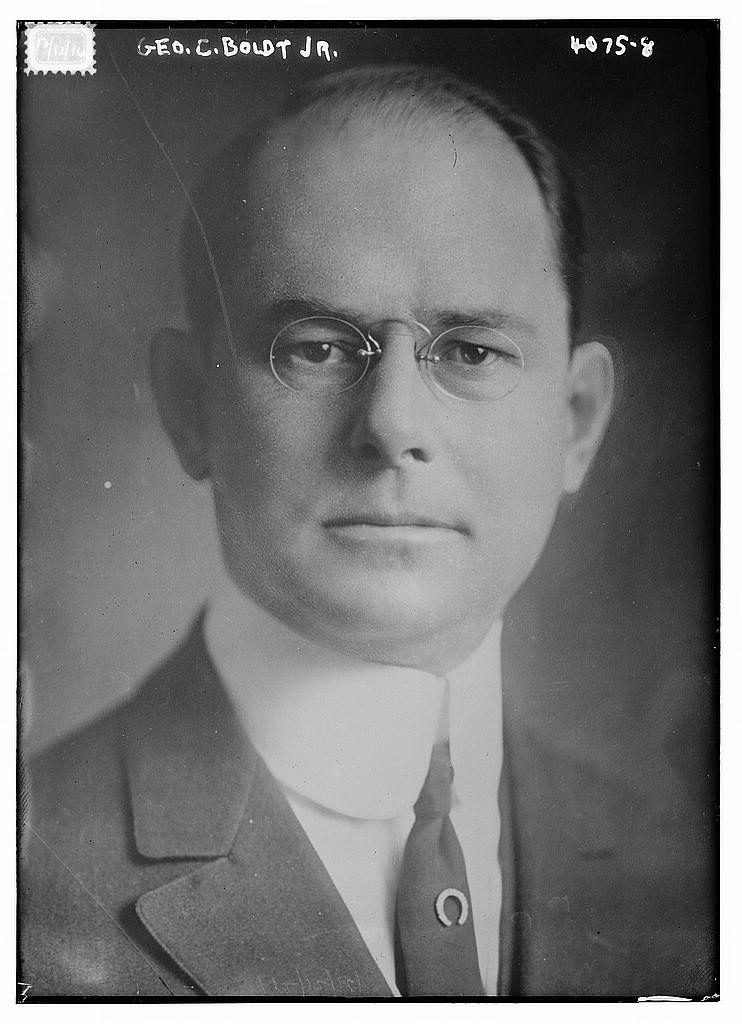
- George Charles Boldt Jr. in 1916

President of the Waldorf–Astoria Hotel Company
- In office 1916–1918
- Preceded by: George Charles Boldt Sr.
- Succeeded by: ?

Personal details
- Born: February 4, 1879 Philadelphia, Pennsylvania
- Died: January 26, 1958 (aged 78) Park Avenue; Manhattan, New York City
- Parent(s): George Charles Boldt Sr. Louise Augusta Kehrer
- Education: Cornell University (1905)

George Charles Boldt Jr. (February 4, 1879 – January 26, 1958) was an American hotelier and president of the Waldorf–Astoria Hotel Company.

== Biography ==
He was born on February 4, 1879, in Philadelphia, Pennsylvania, to George Charles Boldt Sr. and Louise Augusta Kehrer. He attended school in Lawrenceville, New Jersey. He attended Cornell University from 1901 to 1905, where he was a member of the Quill and Dagger society. His father died in 1916, George Jr and his sister, Louise Clover Boldt, the wife of Alfred Graham Miles, inherited their father's business holdings with George Jr. named as president of the corporation. Two years later he sold his interest in the company and donated the profit to Cornell University. He died on January 26, 1958, at his home, 290 Park Avenue in Manhattan.
