= Caspar Samler farm =

Tract of land in Manhattan, New York

Coordinates: 40.7461°N 73.9887°W

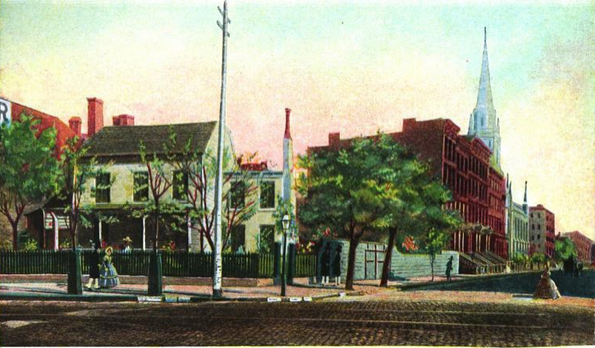
The Casper Samler homestead, 29th Street and Broadway; last farmhouse on Broadway, 1867. It was removed to make way for the Gilsey House, which was razed to make way for an office building by 1922.

The Caspar Samler farm was a tract of land that comprised the greater part of Fifth Avenue from Madison Square to 31st Street in what is now the Koreatown section of Manhattan, New York City, New York.

== History ==
The tract of Common Lands from 28th to 32nd Streets, through which Park Avenue was later projected, was part of the 37 acres (15 ha) farm which Caspar Samler (Note: Charles Greer, a descendant of the Greer family, who owned considerable property in the vicinity of the Caspar Samler farm, says that he is under the impression that the word Samler should be spelled Sembler, and that the farm extended to just above the corner of 30th Street.) bought in various pieces, from the City, between 1780 and 1799 for $12,100. The area now known as Madison Square Garden was owned in 1780 by Samuel, Henry, and Matthias Nicoll, and it was sold to Caspar Samler for US$2,250, becoming part of the 37 acre Caspar Samler farm. Three distinct Samler houses were located on the Commissioners' map of 1807.

Samler had several children and one step daughter, Margaret Grenzeback. He died in 1810, and his daughter Barbara died in 1816 without having ever had children. The 5 acres, 3 roods, and 32 perches of land which were devised for her children, became therefore the property of the survivors of Samler's children or grand children according to the provision of his will. Subsequently, litigation arose as to whether the children of his step daughter Margaret Grenzeback were entitled to a portion under the designation of grandchildren.

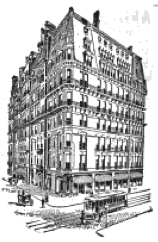
Hotel Victoria

Some well-known buildings of the time later stood on the site. Among them were the Brunswick Hotel, at the northeast corner of 26th Street, once famous as the headquarters of the New York Coaching Club; and the Hotel Victoria, at the southwest corner of 27th Street, patronized at one time by Grover Cleveland, and later demolished to make way for a 20-story business structure. The Marble Collegiate Church at 29th Street and the Holland House at 30th Street also stood on sites once part of the Samler farm.

North of the Caspar Samler farm, extending on Fifth Avenue from near 32nd almost to 36th Streets, were the 30 acres of land bought in 1799 by John Thompson. In 1827, William Backhouse Astor, Sr. bought a half interest, including Fifth Avenue from 32nd to 35th Streets, for US$20,500. He built an unpretentious square red brick house on the southwest corner of 34th Street and Fifth Avenue, while John Jacob Astor erected a home at the northwest corner of 33rd Street. The Waldorf Hotel, opened in 1893, occupied the former site of John Jacob Astor's house. The Astoria Hotel, opened in 1897, stood on the site of William Backhouse Astor's house. The two hotels, under one management, became known as the Waldorf-Astoria, which was razed in 1929 to make way for construction of the Empire State Building.
