= George Boldt =

American hotelier

George Charles Boldt Sr.
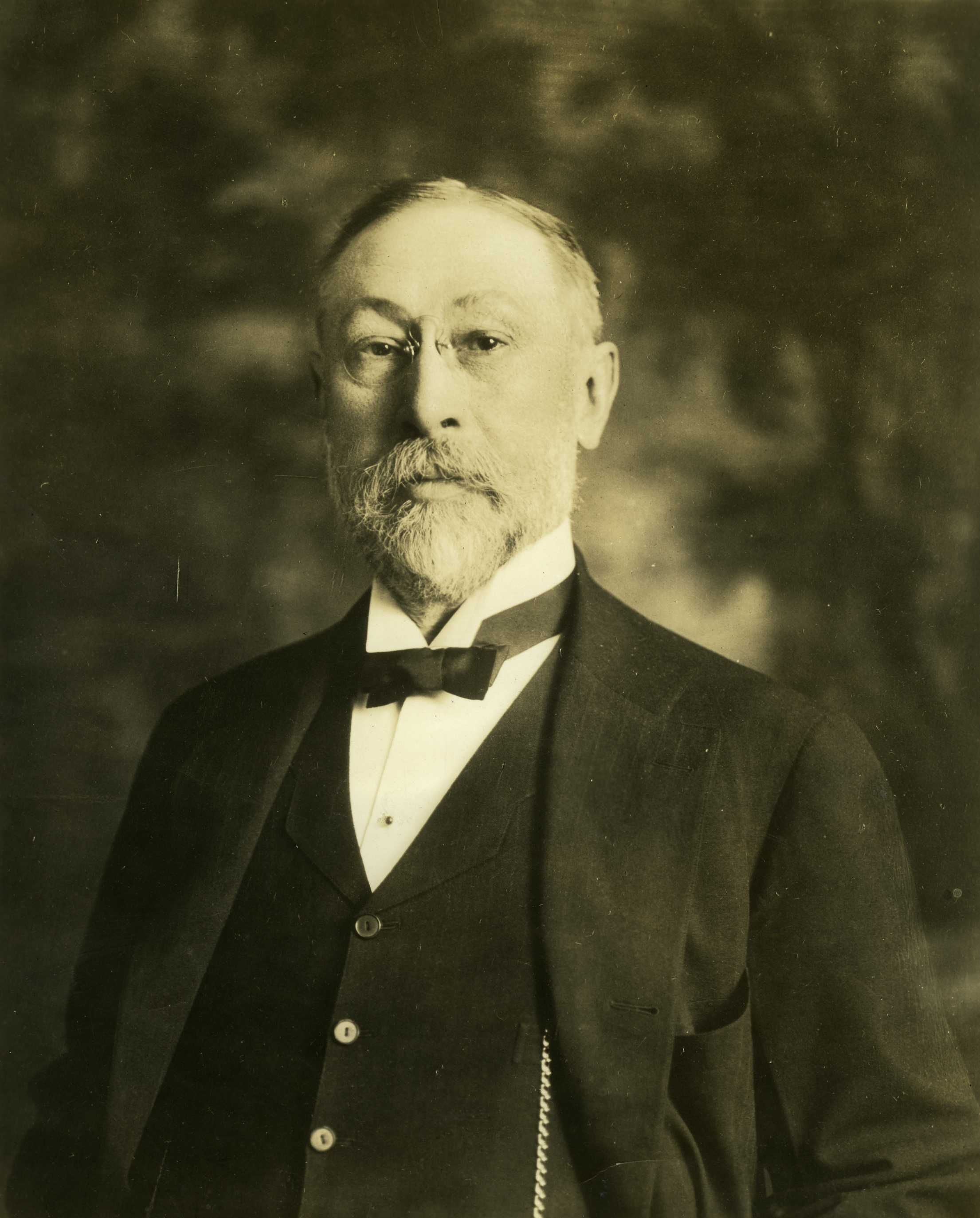
- Boldt between 1900 and 1910

President of the Waldorf–Astoria Hotel Company
- In office 1897–1916
- Succeeded by: George Charles Boldt Jr.

Personal details
- Born: Georg Karl Boldt; April 25, 1851 Bergen auf Rügen, Prussia
- Died: December 5, 1916 (aged 65) New York City, U.S.
- Spouse: Louise Augusta Kehrer
- Children: George Charles Boldt Jr. Clover Louise Boldt

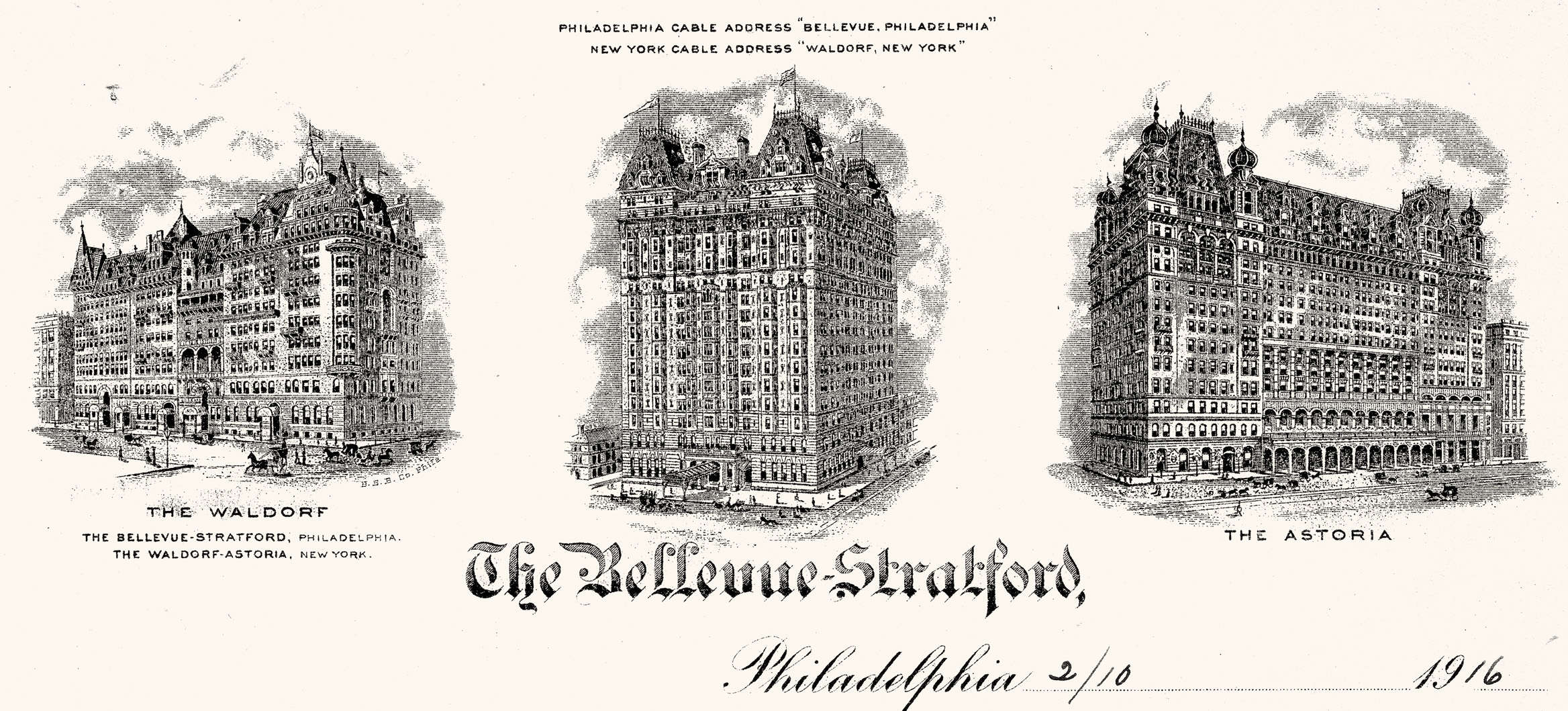
Engraved 1916 letterhead of The Bellevue-Stratford Hotel with vignettes of the hotel as well as those of the Waldorf and Astoria Hotels in New York all of which were then operating under the management of George Boldt.

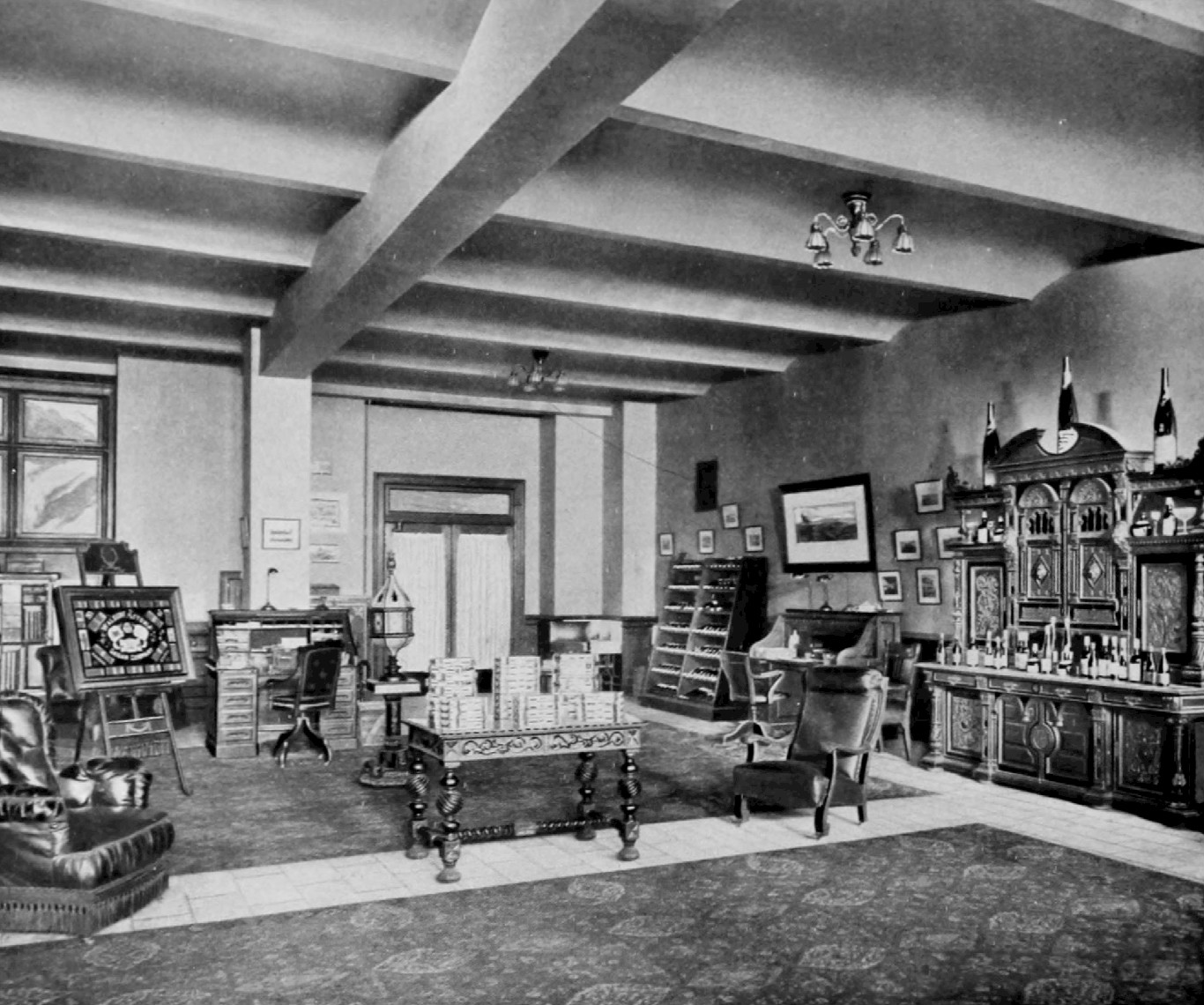
Boldt also owned the Waldorf Astoria Segar Company

George Charles Boldt Sr. (April 25, 1851 – December 5, 1916) was a Prussian-born American hotelier. A self-made millionaire, he influenced the development of the urban hotel as a civic social center and luxury destination.

== Early life ==
Georg Karl Boldt was born in Bergen auf Rügen, Pommern, on April 25, 1851. (Note: His US passport application says it was Ribnitz-Damgarten, Germany.)

== Career ==
In 1864, he immigrated to the United States. He began as a kitchen worker in New York and, at age 25, was hired (by his future father-in-law) to manage the dining room of Philadelphia's most exclusive gentlemen's club, the Philadelphia Club.

Boldt's first hotel was the Bellevue (1881), at the northwest corner of Broad and Walnut Streets, in Philadelphia. He soon bought a competing hotel, the Stratford, at the southwest corner. Two decades later, on the site of the Stratford, he built the largest hotel the city had ever seen, the 1,090-room The Bellevue-Stratford Hotel (1902–04, now the Hyatt).

The enormous fortunes generated by robber barons in the post-Civil War-era led to an unprecedented level of luxurious living for wealthy Americans. Boldt catered to the emerging plutocratic class by implementing a premium pricing strategy in exchange for elite services. Through these business practices, he eventually attained a social and financial status comparable to that of his clientele.

William Waldorf Astor built the Waldorf Hotel (1890–93) in New York City, with Boldt as proprietor. John Jacob Astor IV built the adjoining Astoria Hotel (1897). Boldt mediated between the feuding millionaire cousins, leasing the Astoria himself, and merging the two buildings under his management as the Waldorf-Astoria Hotel. (Note: At the time of his death, Boldt was the sole owner of the Waldorf Astoria Hotel Company, which held the lease on the Waldorf-Astoria property.) The Empire State Building now occupies its site at 34th Street and 5th Avenue. He is credited with popularizing Thousand Island dressing at the Waldorf-Astoria Hotel, where he instructed the maître d', Oscar Tschirky, to include it on the menu. The hotel introduced other popular food items, such as Waldorf Salad. Boldt also owned the Waldorf Astoria Segar Company, which imported fine Cuban cigars and was located at the hotel. (Note: At the time of his death, the Waldorf Astoria Segar Company was valued at $US 1 million.)

He built Boldt Castle on an island in the Thousand Islands area of New York State. The enormous castle was intended as a gift for his wife, Louise Kehrer Boldt, but when she died suddenly on January 7, 1904, in Manhattan, at the age of 42, construction was halted. The castle, near Alexandria Bay, was restored after decades of vandalism and is now a major summer tourist attraction.

Towards the end of his life, he commissioned architect Francis T. Underhill to build him a Swiss-chalet-style mansion, "La Manzanita," in Montecito, Santa Barbara, California.

== Death ==
Boldt died on December 5, 1916, in Manhattan, New York City, of a heart attack. He was buried in Woodlawn Cemetery, Bronx, New York.

== Legacy ==
Boldt once owned Nikola Tesla's Wardenclyffe Tower property, receiving it as payment for a debt. Tesla mortgaged the property to Boldt and the Waldorf-Astoria to pay the costs of his residence at the hotel when he encountered financial difficulties. Tesla did so first in 1904 and again in 1908; he was unable to repay the mortgages. Boldt and the Waldorf-Astoria foreclosed on the property in 1915. (Note: After the foreclosure on Wardenclyffe Tower, Tesla continued to live at the Waldorf. Tesla, who had lived at the hotel for fifteen years, was evicted in 1917 after continued complaints from the hotel's maid staff about unpleasant odors and a large amount of pigeon droppings in the room Tesla occupied. Tesla visited local parks, rescuing injured pigeons and nursing them back to health in his hotel room. As he was being evicted, Tesla received a bill for his unpaid rent and room service that totalled more than $US 19,000.)

He was a trustee of Cornell University. In 1923, Boldt's daughter, Mrs. Alfred G. Miles, donated US$50,000 to the university for the construction of Boldt Tower to honor her father's memory. Boldt Hall is also named for him. Three bricks from the original structure of the Waldorf-Astoria Hotel were incorporated into the building. Saying that his father always sympathized with an eager student whose only impediment to higher education was a lack of funds, Boldt's son George C. Boldt Jr. established a scholarship program at Cornell bearing his father's name in 1922. (Note: George C. Boldt died on January 26, 1965.)

During his lifetime, Boldt was a frequent donor to Cornell University, the American Red Cross, many local hospitals and built a library at Alexandria Bay, New York. (Note: Both Boldt and Oscar Tschirky sent their sons to college at Cornell.) Boldt also helped put at least 75 young men through college, doing this anonymously. He also assisted those in business who were having financial difficulties and told employees at his hotels if they were having monetary problems, his door was always open to them.

Boldt's will equally divided US$15 million between his son and daughter, with a request to his children that they continue to financially support the charities he had donated to in the past. While the will gave his children the right to dispose of any or all of Boldt's properties, they made no plans to sell any of their father's holdings, with George Charles Boldt Jr. assuming the presidency of the company his father began.

== Family ==
From his marriage to Louise Augusta Kehrer, he had two children: George Charles Boldt Jr. and Clover Louise Boldt, later Mrs. Alfred Graham Miles, and three granddaughters.

== Gallery ==
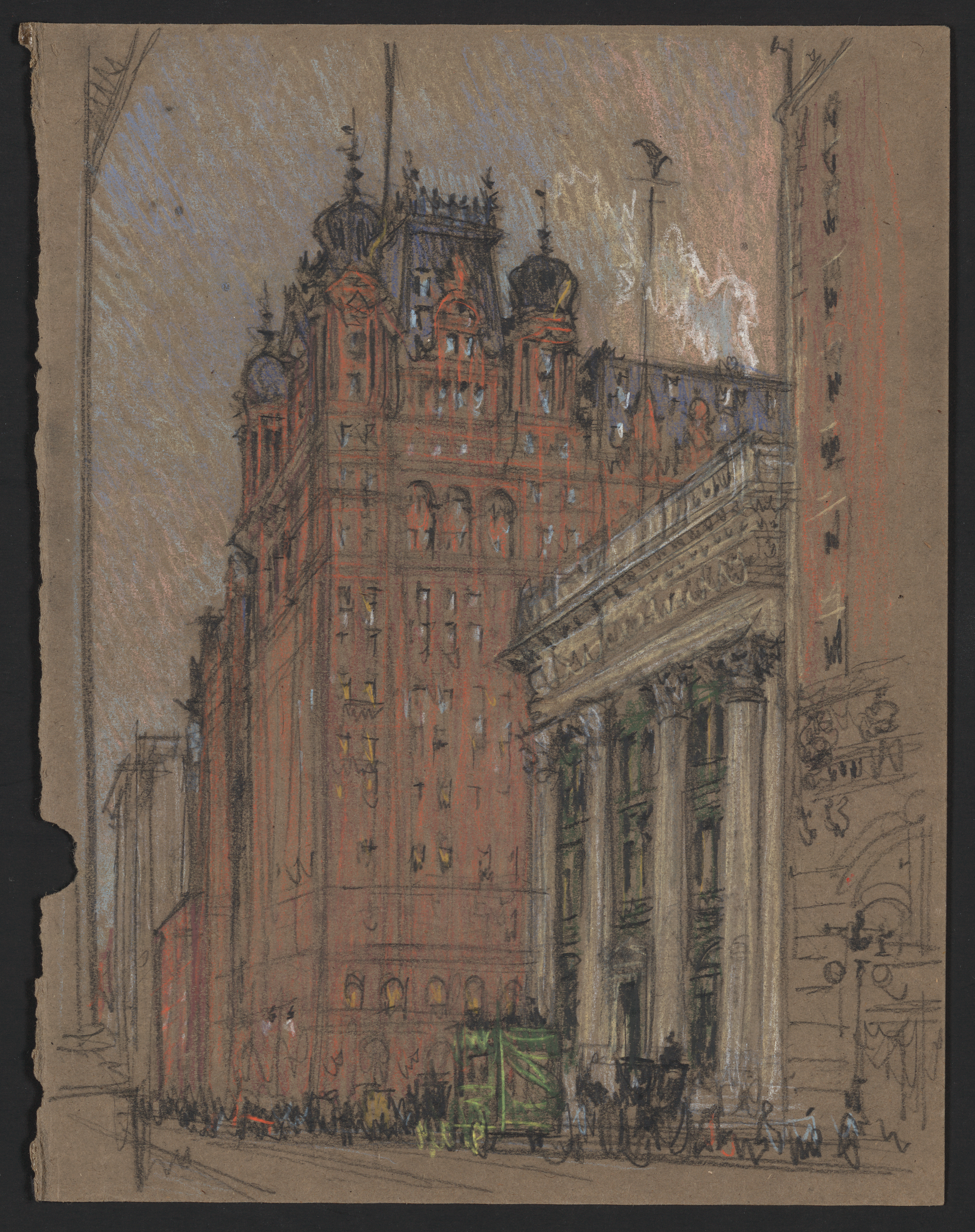
Waldorf-Astoria Hotel, New York City (1890-93 & 1897), Henry J. Hardenbergh, architect (of both hotels)

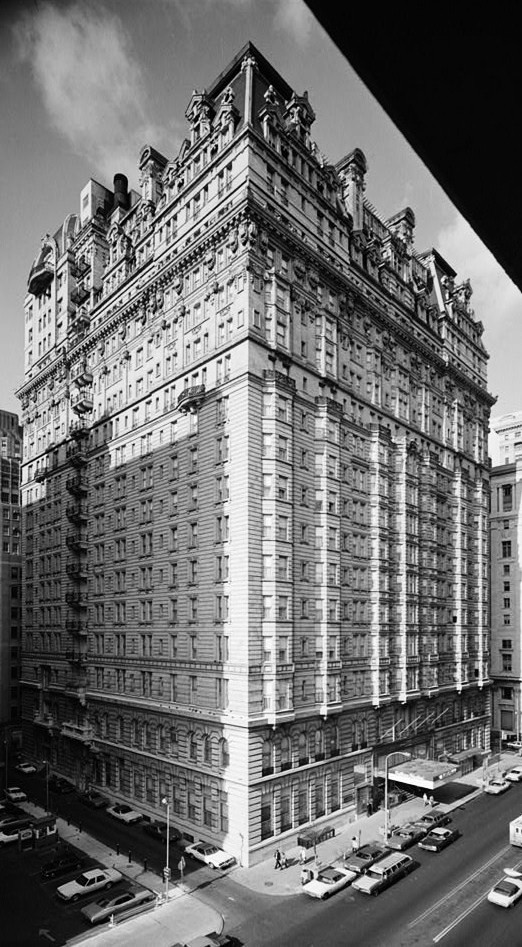
The Bellevue-Stratford Hotel, Broad & Walnut Sts., Philadelphia (1902–04), G. W. & W. D. Hewitt, architects

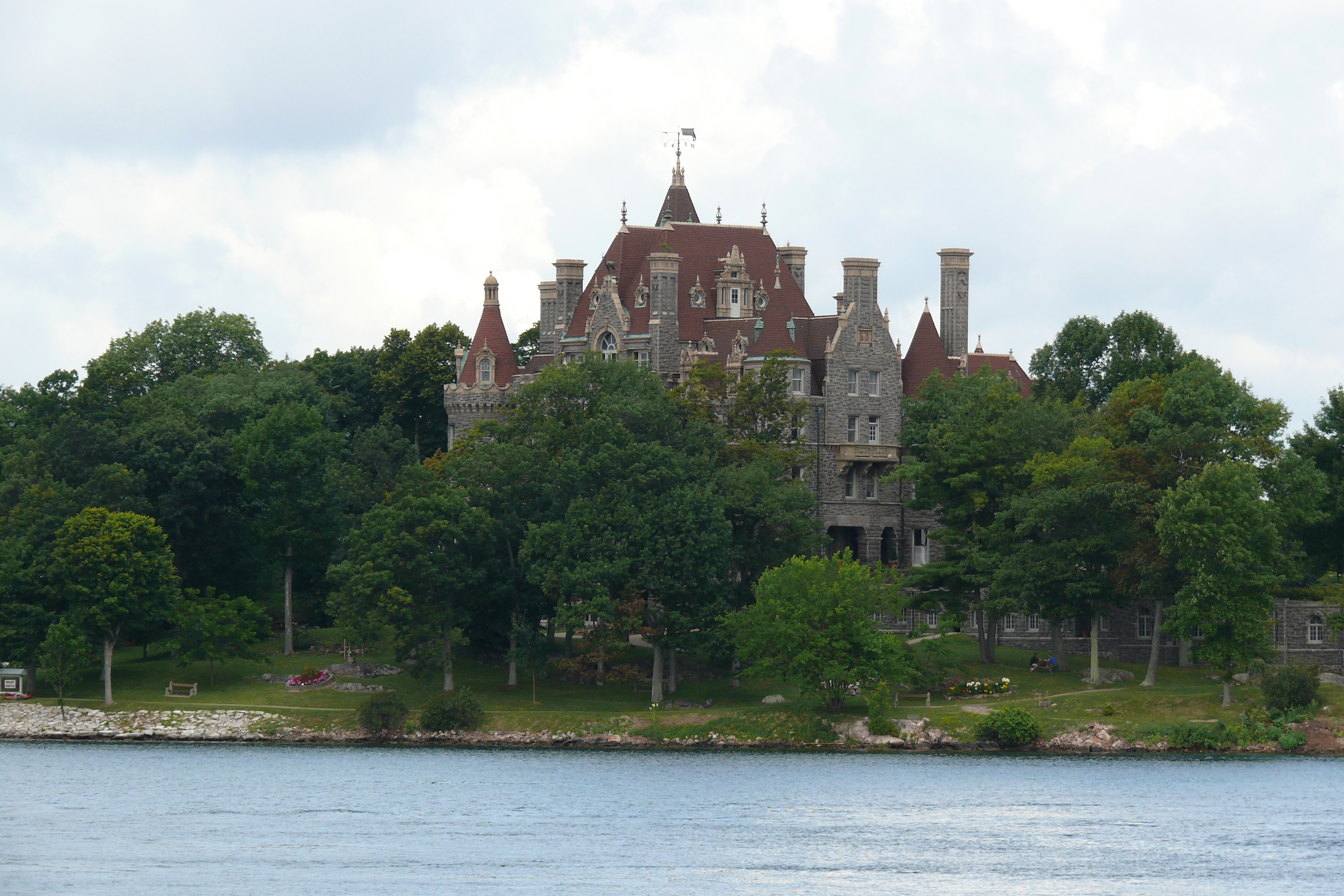
Boldt Castle, Heart Island, Alexandria Bay, New York (1900–04), G. W. & W. D. Hewitt, architects

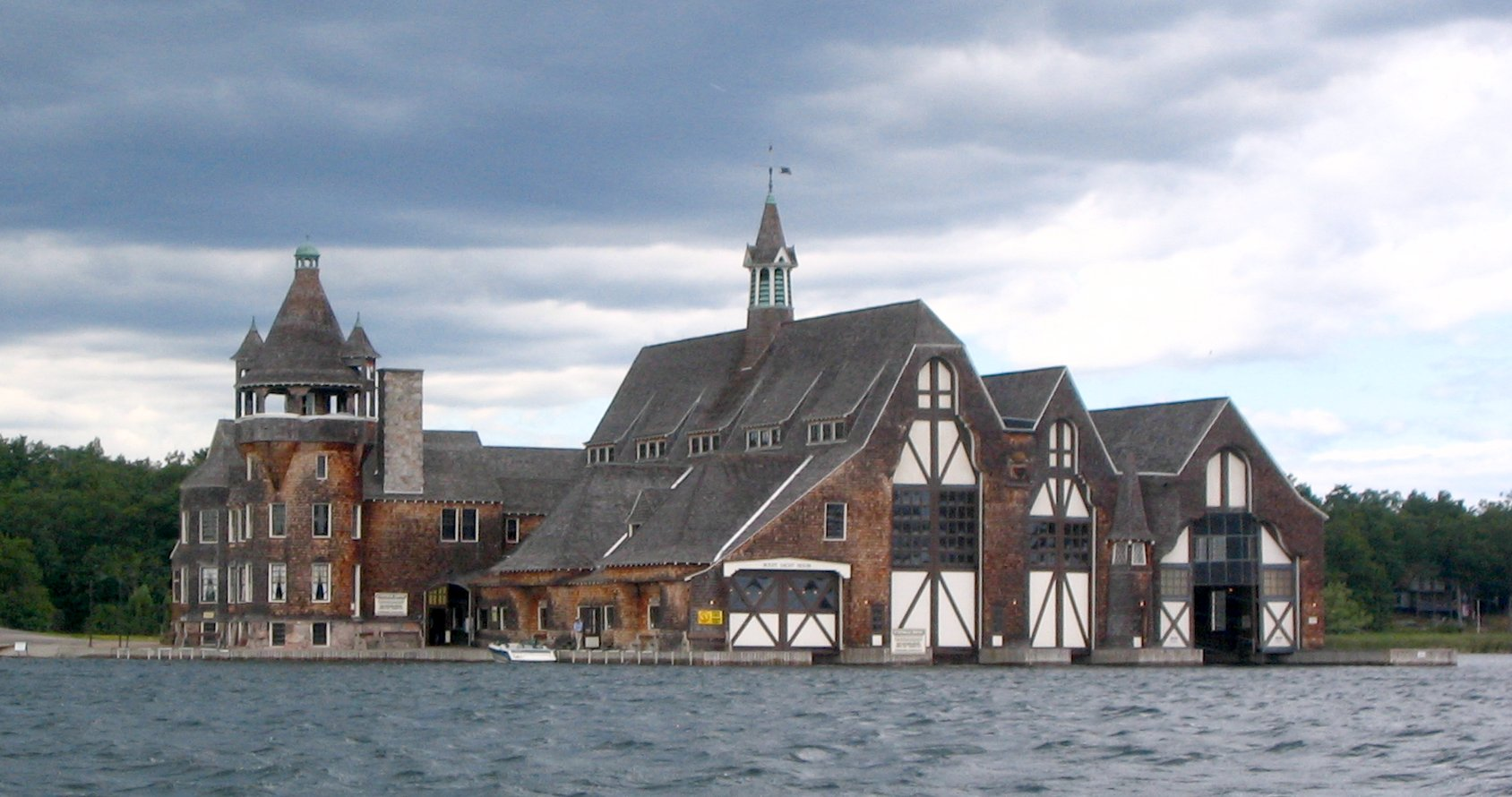
George C. Boldt Yacht House, Alexandria Bay, New York (1903), G. W. & W. D. Hewitt, architects

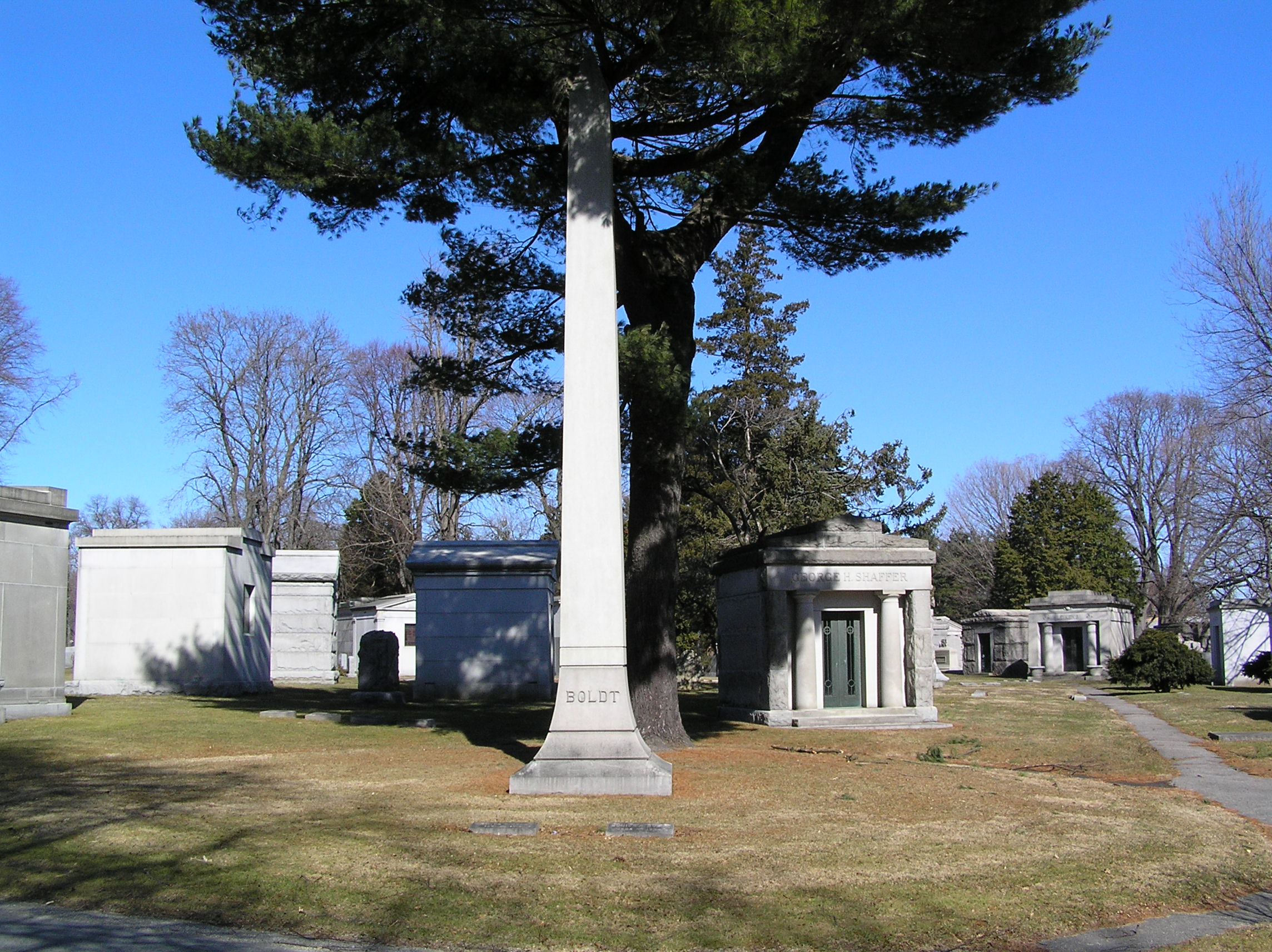
George C. Boldt Monument, Woodlawn Cemetery (Bronx, New York)

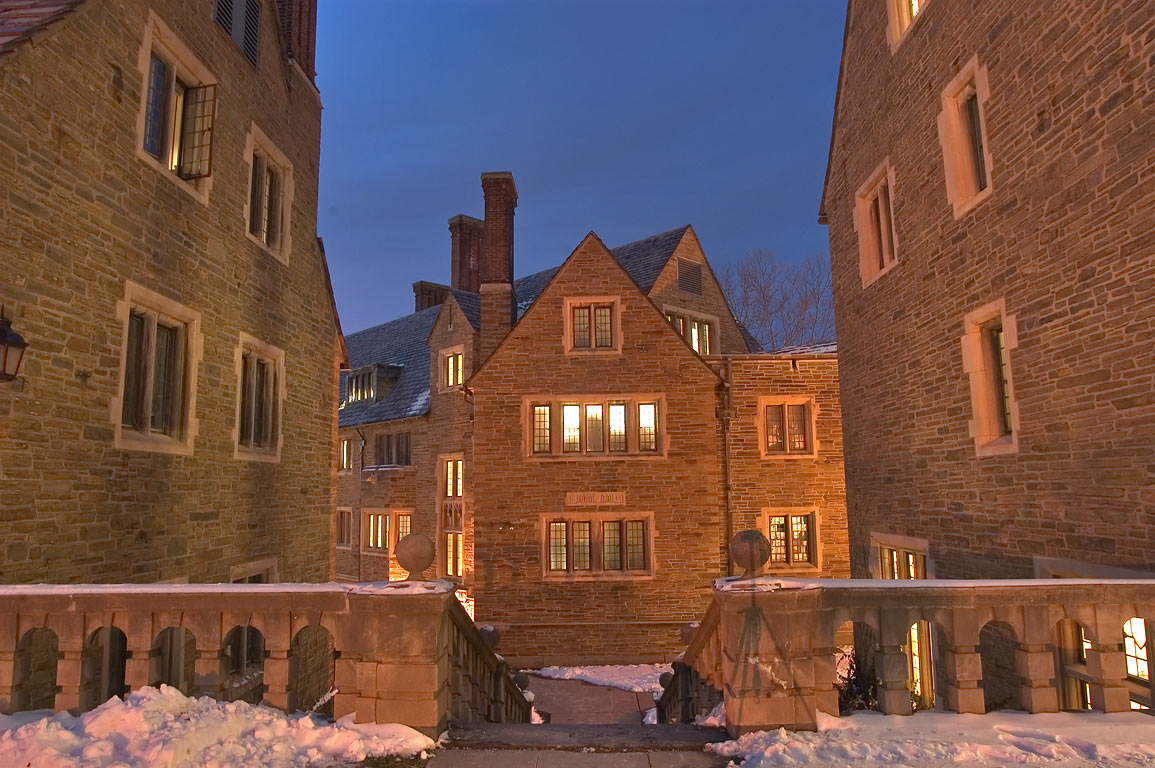
Boldt Hall and Tower (Language House), Cornell University, Ithaca, New York (1922–23), Day & Klauder, architects
