= Seoul Foreign School =

Location
- 39 Yeonhui-ro 22-gil, Seodaemun-gu, Seoul, Republic of Korea 03723; 37°34′9″N 126°56′13″E

Information
- Type: Independent School
- Established: 1912
- Head of School: Colm Flanagan
- Enrollment: ~1,500
- Colors: Red; Black
- Athletics conference: KAIAC; APAC
- Team name: The Crusaders
- Website: www.seoulforeign.org

Seoul Foreign School (Korean: 서울외국인학교) is a Pre-K/Reception to Grade 12 international school located in Seoul, South Korea. The school was founded in 1913 by Christian missionaries to Korea and emphasizes Christian values. The Elementary, Middle and High Schools offer an international curriculum within the International Baccalaureate framework of PYP, MYP and DP. The High School offers the IB Diploma Programme. The British School offers the English National Curriculum - Key Stages 1–3. Seoul Foreign School has been located in Yeonhui-dong, Seodaemun-gu, since 2026.

Seoul Foreign School is accredited by the Western Association of Schools and Colleges (WASC) and the (CIS)

== History ==
Seoul Foreign School was founded in 1912 by Christian missionaries to Korea (Ethel Van Wagoner Underwood), with one class of 18 students. The school started in 1912 with 7 teachers and currently has over 1,500 students from more than 50 countries, offering education from PK to high school. It is differentiated from other international schools by offering not only kindergarten, primary, middle, and high school courses but also the British curriculum IGCSE. With a prestigious history spanning over 100 years, the admissions requirements are stringent.

To apply to SFS, students must either have a foreign nationality or have lived in a foreign country for an extended period of time. If both parents have foreign nationalities, the student meets the top-tier eligibility requirements. Furthermore, tuition fees are at a level of 30-40 million won per year, equivalent to college tuition fees. The school offers many after-school programs like KAIAC and SWEP, and hosts diverse events.

SFS was initially established in 1912 under the Korean name Kyungsung Foreign School. The inaugural principal was Edel Underwood, the wife of H.H. Underwood, known in Korea as Won Han-kyung. The school's name changed to 'Seoul Foreign School' in 1964.

The first principal and teacher, as mentioned above, was Edel Underwood, a member of the Underwood family, who founded Yeonhee Professional School, the precursor to Yonsei University. After relocating its premises in Seoul five times, the school settled in its current location next to Yonsei University in Yeonhui-dong in 1957. In 1981, it merged with the 'British School' attended by the children of British expatriates. Boasting a spacious campus of 100,000m^{2} and a long history, it is the most preferred school among foreigners in Korea.

SFS students learn through debates and presentations and are assessed through essay-type exams that ask for their opinions. Forty years ago, they were the first in Korea to adopt the 'International Baccalaureate (IB)' curriculum, created by a Swiss international organization, rather than adhering to a specific national educational curriculum.

In 2023, it is one of the oldest international schools in the world, and the oldest British international school in Korea and the first in South Korea to offer the IB Diploma.

== Divisions ==
British School
Principal: Andrew Freeman

The British School (SFBS) offers a curriculum based around the English National Curriculum spanning from Reception to Year 9. It is a member of the Federation of British International Schools in Asia (FOBISIA) and students participate in sports, maths and other activities alongside other member schools. There are students from over 45 nationalities at the school.

Elementary School

The elementary school (SFES) offers an international curriculum based within the IB PYP framework. Grade levels include Pre-K2 to Grade 5. The school is a four-form entry starting in Grade 1. School uniforms were introduced to SFES in the school year 2008-2009. The Seoul Foreign Elementary School offers specialist classes such as Music, World Language (Korean, Chinese), STEM, Library, Art, PE and PSE. The Pedagogical Leadership Team consists of the two principals, PYP Coordinator, Literacy Coach, Student Support Team Coordinator and Leader-in-Training. A new building was completed for the 2008-2009 school year and includes a cafeteria, 400-seat performance hall, media center/library, upgraded classrooms, and a spirit store. In the fall of 2011, a 1-to-1 laptop program was instituted in Grades 4 & 5.

Middle School

The Middle School is located in its own building built in 1988. There are five foreign language tracks offered: Spanish, French, Mandarin, Korean (for non-native speakers) and heritage Korean (for native Korean speakers). The music program is especially strong, with multiple levels of course offerings in choir, band and strings orchestra. Every student also takes Christian Studies, an academic course that introduces students to the foundational ideas of the Christian faith from a non-denominational perspective. Students who are interested in exploring their faith on a personal level may participate in a vibrant after-school discipleship program. All students take Physical Health Education. Students take Physical Education in multiple facilities in the school, such as the tennis courts, the swimming pool, etcetera. All SFMS students are able to participate in a variety of after-school sports and activities. Some examples are math club, soccer team, or cooking class. SFMS belongs to the Korean American Interscholastic Activities Conference (KAIAC), allowing for competition and collaboration with other schools in sports and the arts. The Boys Basketball "Select A Team," of the Seoul Foreign Middle School, (a team of 12 boys selected through a series of tryouts), participated in the 2024 U14 Basketball tournament hosted by the International School of Bangkok, where they would go on to win 2 matches and secure 6th place.

High School
Principal: Piotr Kocyk

The high school (SFHS) offers an international curriculum that is accredited by the Western Association of Schools and Colleges (WASC). The high school offers the International Baccalaureate (IB) Diploma. Graduates from Seoul Foreign School attend universities and colleges throughout the world.

== Music program ==
All students from kindergarten through 8th grade/Year 9 take music classes. The school offers a band, choir and orchestra program as well as IB DP music. The Middle School/KS3 have five bands: Beginner Band, Intermediate Band, Concert Band, Symphonic Band, and Jazz Band. Both the Middle School Symphonic Band and the High School Wind Ensemble have won numerous awards and acknowledgements in the field. The Middle School Symphonic Band won a platinum award [highest ranking award] on a nationwide competition in 2015.

== Performing arts facilities ==
The Lyso Center for Performing Arts was constructed in 2004. It includes large rehearsal rooms for band, choir and orchestra, as well as ensemble and individual practice rooms. There is also a keyboard/composition lab. The main theater seats over 700 people, has a hydraulic orchestra pit, a turn table, and a removable large Wenger acoustical sell. There is also a Black Box theater with flexible seating up to 200 people. Robb Hall is a mid-size theater and has seating for 450 people.

== Athletic facilities ==
Seoul Foreign School has an indoor sports complex which houses two gyms, each with several basketball courts, indoor volleyball courts, as well as one weight training/fitness room. Also, located outside are two more basketball courts (next to the soccer field). More basketball courts can also be found on the British school playground. There is an artificial turf football (soccer) field, a sandpit for long jump, and a running track. There is also an indoor pool with two tennis courts situated above it. Two more tennis courts are situated adjacent to the British school playground. There is also a gymnastics room for various uses ranging from acrobatics workout to ballet practice. An additional four tennis courts are located on the roof of the cafeteria. In 2024, the school additionally created an indoor golf simulation.

== Christian emphasis ==
SFS seeks to model Christianity through the hiring of exceptional and experienced educators who are also practicing Christians. The influence of Christianity originated in 1912 when missionaries first founded the school and continue today. The school is not affiliated with a particular denomination or church, nor are students required to come from religious backgrounds. Students from Grade 6-10 are required to take a mandatory Religious Studies course regardless of their religious backgrounds.

== Notable alumni ==
- Ken Jennings: holds the record for the longest winning streak in the U.S. syndicated game show Jeopardy!
- Ien Chi: Korean American filmmaker, 2011 winner of the Best Director and Best Picture awards at the world's largest student film festival: Campus MovieFest, former creative director of Jubilee
- Yoon Ha Lee: American Science Fiction and fantasy writer.
- James Rhee: Entrepreneur and Founder of Aero-K Airlines
- Ejae: Korean-American singer-songwriter and record producer known for her work on KPop Demon Hunters, including co-writing the Academy Award- and Golden Globe-winning song "Golden".
