= Thor Equities =

American private equity firm

- Type: Private
- Industry: Private equity real estate
- Founded: 1986; 40 years ago
- Founder: Joseph Sitt
- Headquarters: New York City, New York, United States
- Area served: Worldwide
- Products: Real estate, Hotels, Shopping Centers, Retail, Mixed Use
- AUM: $20 billion
- Website: www.thorequities.com

Thor Equities is a real estate development, leasing and management firm, with headquarters in New York City, London and Mexico City. Thor Equities owns property in the United States, Canada, Europe, Russia, India and Latin America, including London's historic Burlington Arcade and the Palmer House Hilton. In New York City, Thor owns retail, office and residential properties on Fifth Avenue and Madison Avenue as well as in SoHo, Flatiron, the Meatpacking District, and Brooklyn including Coney Island. Thor also has investments in major U.S. cities including San Francisco's Union Square; Georgetown in Washington, D.C.; Robertson Boulevard in West Hollywood; Collins Avenue; Lincoln Road; Wynwood and the Design District in Miami. Thor offers investment vehicles for institutional investors through its Thor Urban Property Funds. Thor Equities also has several subsidiary companies including retail advisory and tenant representation firm Thor Retail Advisors.

== Background ==
Thor Equities was founded in 1986 by President & CEO Joseph J. Sitt. His first investment was a property sold at tax auction on East Tremont Avenue in the Bronx, a chronically under served retail area, where he built a one-story retail structure with money from family and friends. He proceeded to secure national retailers Rite Aid Pharmacy and Payless Shoes after convincing them of the value of this location.

== Ashley Stewart ==
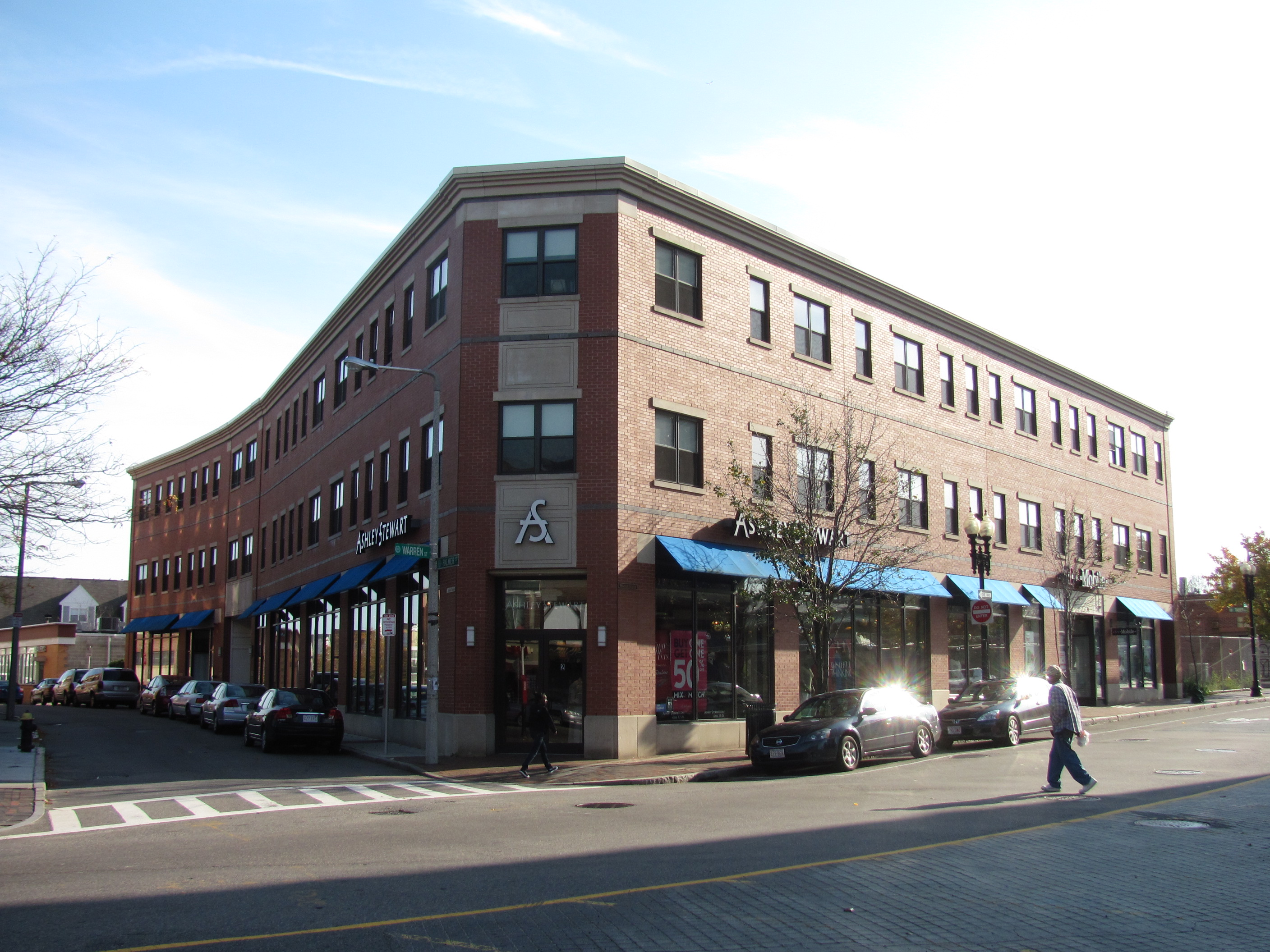
Ashley Stewart in Roxbury, Massachusetts

From Sitt's early realization of the retail gap that left broad swathes of inner city consumers largely underserved by major retailers, he founded Ashley Stewart (a name inspired by Laura Ashley and Martha Stewart) in 1991. Ashley Stewart sold modern and fashionable clothing to women.

Each Ashley Stewart store hired from within the community, and the company was recognized by President Clinton for its contribution to the Welfare-to-work program. Ashley Stewart quickly grew to over 380 stores in more than 100 cities, which prompted many national retailers to follow suit and helped change the urban retail landscape. Sitt was also part owner of the Children's Place kids clothing chain as well as Marianne Stores, a retail outlet specializing in clothing for Latina women.

As business boomed, Sitt sold his interest in 2000 to concentrate on urban real estate through his company Thor Equities.

In 2004, Sitt was profiled by Crains New York in its annual "40 Under 40" issue, which celebrates those individuals in New York City who have achieved success in business before turning 40.

== Development Activities ==
Thor Equities is a global full service real estate development and investment company specializing in acquisitions, financial management, development, property management, and leasing. Thor specializes in value-added investments in retail, hotels and mixed-use urban projects. Today, Thor's portfolio transactions and development pipeline total over 20 million square feet and is valued at more than $10 billion.

Thor also created an investment platform tailored to institutional investors. Thor Urban Property Funds investors include investment banks, pension funds, college endowments, and foundations. The fund's size was over one billion dollars as of 2013.

In recent years, Thor has expanded its holdings internationally to include properties in cities like Mexico City, London, Paris, Montreal, Cannes, Milan and Madrid.

=== Notable Global Developments and Acquisitions ===
Thor acquired London's iconic Burlington Arcade in 2010 for £104 million. The property, located in the West End shopping district, was built in 1819 and is London's first covered shopping street. Thor's London assets also include 145 Oxford Street, 105-109 Oxford Street, 1 Dover Street, and Bond Street House at 14 Clifford Street.

In 2012, Thor acquired a major retail property at 65 Boulevard de la Croisette in Cannes, France.

In Paris, the company has acquired several properties including 51-53 Boulevard Haussmann, a 30,225-square-foot building; 65-67 Avenue des Champs Elysees; and 102 Avenue des Champs-Élysées.

In February 2015, Thor acquired a retail property at 777 Saint Catherine Street in Montreal, a historical building located in Montreal's shopping corridor that is currently occupied by Banana Republic.

In 2015 and 2016, Thor expanded its European holdings with the acquisition of 9 Puerta del Sol and 11 Puerta del Sol in Madrid, and 26 Via della Spiga in Milan.

Thor also owns several luxury retail properties in Mexico City on Avenida Presidente Masaryk, and has attracted such retailers as Gucci and Salvatore Ferragamo. In 2016, Thor's hospitality division debuted the Thompson Playa del Carmen, a boutique hotel in Playa del Carmen, Mexico.

=== Manhattan ===
Thor is a major retail property owner on New York's Fifth Avenue and Madison Avenue. Sitt has been seen as one of the market makers on Fifth Avenue, helping push retail growth further below the traditional southern border at 49th Street.

Thor has also made significant investments in the Meatpacking District, betting on the area to continue its climb as a premier retail destination in Manhattan, driven in part by the High Line and arrival of the new Whitney Museum.

Thor is also heavily active in New York's SoHo area and owns numerous properties in the district. In 2013, Sitt partnered with several investors to purchase 529 Broadway for $150 million. In March 2015, the company leased its entire 15,000-square-foot building at 155 Mercer Street in SoHo to Dolce & Gabbana for the brand's flagship retail store.

Other areas of Manhattan where Thor owns properties include Tribeca, Madison Avenue, Chelsea, Bowery, Flatiron, the Upper East Side, and its headquarters near Bryant Park.

In 2014 and 2015, Thor purchased a number of residential buildings in Manhattan including 98 Morningside Avenue and 838 West End Avenue, as well as a portfolio of more than two dozen apartment buildings such as 250 West 19th Street.

=== Brooklyn ===
Thor owns a large portfolio of Brooklyn properties located in Brooklyn Heights, Cobble Hill, Boerum Hill, Downtown Brooklyn, Williamsburg, and Red Hook.

A notable development is Albee Square Mall in Downtown Brooklyn. After Thor purchased the mall in 2001, it made various facility improvements in an effort to attract new tenants. Later in 2005, Thor announced plans to build the first tower at the site also known as City Point. The building was to be the tallest tower in Brooklyn. After the city changed its zoning to permit development of the site, Thor sold the site and development plan for $125 million to a financial company.

==== Coney Island ====
In 2005, the company bought a parcel of land west of the amusement district in Coney Island for $13 million, and sold it 14 months later for $90 million. Thor then reinvested in more land on Coney Island along Stillwell Avenue as well as some Boardwalk property including Astroland. In 2006, Thor announced plans for a $1.5 billion Las Vegas-style amusement park resort, which required several zoning changes. The city had a competing vision for Coney Island and attempted to buy Thor's land, but Thor did not accept the city's offer. Astroland ceased operations on September 7, 2008. Interim amusement rides and a flea market opened in the summer of 2009 and closed later that year.

On November 11, 2009, Sitt reached a deal with New York City to sell part of his 12.5 acres (51,000 m2) of land in Coney Island for $95.6 million so that the city and Thor could jointly redevelop Coney Island, completing the three-year negotiation.

In May 2015, Thor Equities unveiled Coney Art Walls, a public art wall project curated by former director of the Museum of Contemporary Art (MOCA) Jeffrey Deitch and Thor CEO Joseph Sitt. Located at 3050 Stillwell Avenue, the project featured established and new artists. Coney Art Walls returned in 2016 with 21 new murals.

In 2025, Coney Island based community organizations including Coney Island USA and the Coney Island History Project opposed the casino development proposed by Thor Equities for Coney Island. With a majority of the community advisory committee signally their intent to vote against the project, the development will not proceed.

=== Chicago ===
Thor bought the historic Palmer House Hilton Hotel in Chicago's Loop area in 2005 for $230 million and undertook an award-winning $150 million renovation. The Lockwood Restaurant at the Palmer House was also named a James Beard Award winner. In October 2012, the company refinanced Palmer House Hilton in Chicago for $365 million.

Thor owns several retail properties on South State Street including 1-15 East Oak Street, home to the Chicago flagship of Barneys New York. South State Street is one of the main shopping streets located inside Chicago's Loop area, where vacancies were at a 10-year low in 2013.

=== San Francisco ===
Thor owns the landmarked Phelan Building, a Victorian-style steel-framed structure reminiscent of New York's Flatiron building, at 760 Market Street in San Francisco. Thor acquired the property in 2008 from the Westcore Group. The building is home to the San Francisco office of the Sears Corporation as well as Twitter co-founder Evan Williams' startup Obvious Corp. In a press release announcing the lease to Obvious, Joseph Sitt cited the growing trend of Silicon Valley tech companies moving to the surrounding area to set up shop.

=== Mexico ===
Joseph Sitt is chairman of Thor Urbana Capital, based in Mexico City. The venture's first project was a full block high-end retail development along Playa del Carmen's Quinta Avenida. In 2016, Thor's hospitality division opened the Thompson Playa del Carmen, a boutique hotel. As of 2017, the company is also developing the Ritz-Carlton in Mexico City's financial district, among other properties.

== Subsidiary Companies ==
=== Thor Retail Advisors ===
Thor Retail Advisors, led by CEO Joseph Sitt, is an affiliate of Thor Equities that provides tenant representation, brokerage and advisory services to retailers. The company has offices in New York, London, Paris, and Mexico City.

=== Thor Digital ===
Thor Digital, is the latest division launched in early 2022, and focuses on the acquisition and development of data centers across Europe with an equity commitment of up to US$3 billion and goal of US$9 billion in acquisitions value.

== Non profit activities and honors ==
=== Global Gateway Alliance ===
Joseph Sitt is the chairman and founder of the not-for-profit Global Gateway Alliance (GGA), which was created in 2012 to address the infrastructure challenges that New York's airports face.

=== Additional non profit activities and honors ===
Joseph Sitt is an active board member of the Bedford Stuyvesant Restoration Corporation, a community development organization. He was instrumental in helping restore Restoration Plaza, the neighborhood's Town Square and the BSRC's main asset, and bringing to the area more retail options including its first family sit-down restaurant and supermarket. In 2007, Harvard professor Michael Porter and the Initiative for a Competitive Inner City (ICIC) honored him for his commitment to fostering healthy competitive business conditions and new opportunities in inner city neighborhoods.

Sitt is a managing director of Venetian Heritage, a not-for-profit organization that works to restore the Jewish museum and ancient synagogues of the Ghetto of Venice.

Sitt is also a frequent speaker and lecturer at various universities including Columbia University, New York University, Baruch, and Notre Dame. He serves on the board of the Real Estate Roundtable in Washington D.C., the Department of Real Estate at Baruch College, and is a member of the Partnership for New York City.

Mr. Sitt has been named by New York Observer in its annual list as one of the Most Powerful People in New York Real Estate.

== Lawsuit ==
In May 2020, Thor 's offer to sell 933 Broadway to Mactaggart fell apart. When they clashed over a crucial deadline in an approximately $24 million Flatiron District retail contract, Thor Equities and Mactaggart Family & Associates pulled out their abacus and calendar according to new lawsuit.

== See also ==
- Lions Group NYC
- Triple Five Group
- Webb and Knapp
