= Malie Coyne =

Irish psychologist

- Born: Ireland
- Education: National University of Ireland, Galway, Trinity College Dublin
- Scientific career
- Fields: Psychology, pediatrics
- Workplaces: National University of Ireland, Galway

Malie Lagendijk Coyne is an Irish psychologist and author.

== Background ==
Coyne was born in Ireland. She is the daughter of a diplomat.

As an adolescent, she attended Seoul Foreign School in Seoul, South Korea before beginning her undergraduate studies. Between 1998 and 2002, Coyne received her undergraduate degree in psychology and a Master of Science from Trinity College Dublin. In 2007, Coyne received a Doctor of Psychological Science title from the National University of Ireland, Galway.

In 2020, Coyne released her first best-selling book Love In, Love Out published by HarperCollins.

== Honors ==
- Mental Health Media Awards (2019)

== Books ==
- Love In, Love Out (2020)

== Personal life ==
In mass media, Coyne has spoken publicly about her past struggles with eating disorders during adolescence. Coyne's past experiences led to her increasing awareness about mental health issues in appearances on Irish print, radio, and television.
