= Campus DJ =

American music competition

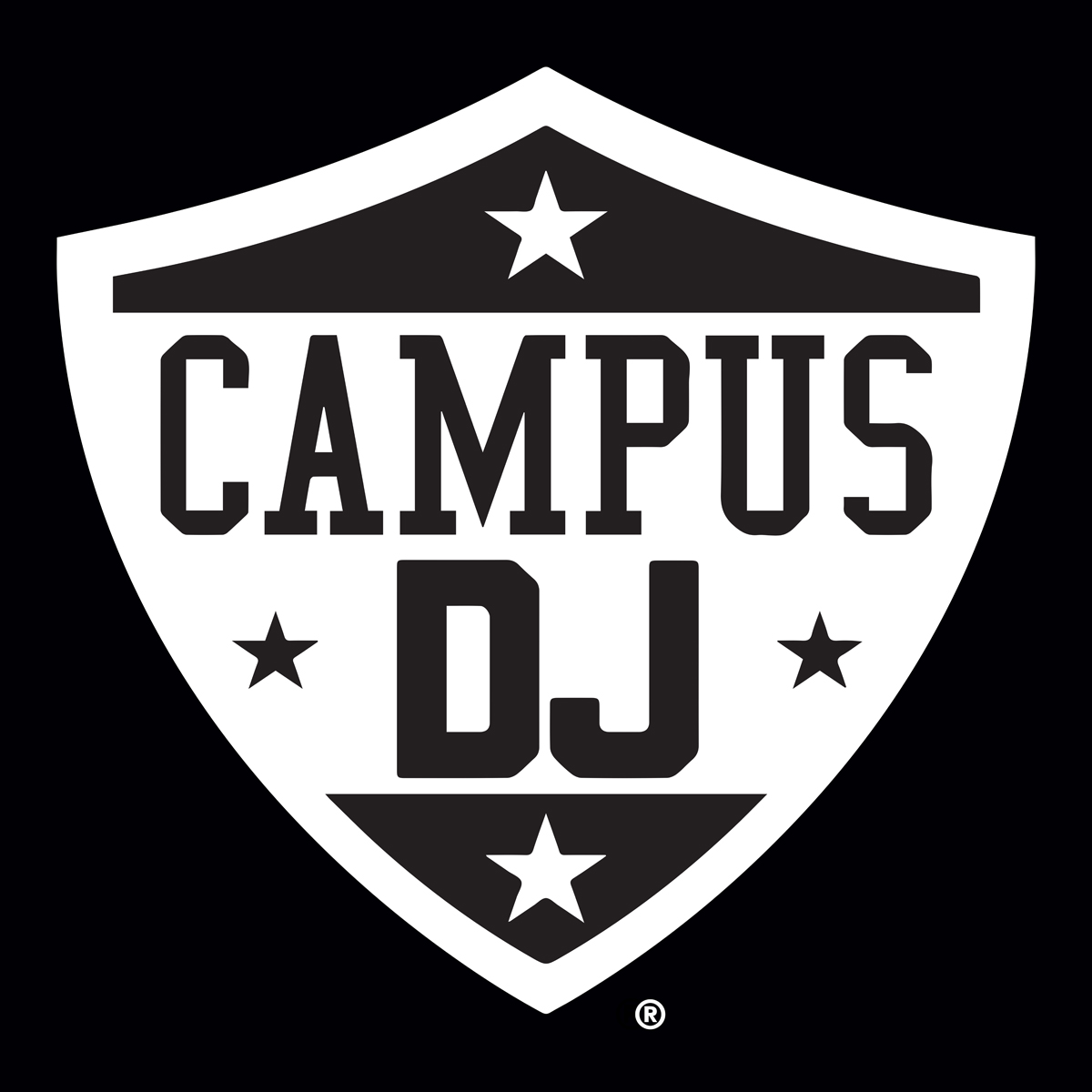
- Industry: Music
- Founded: 2013
- Founders: Campus MovieFest, Evan Shapiro
- Headquarters: Los Angeles, California
- Parent: CAMPVS
- Website: campusdj.com

Campus DJ is a college-specific music competition held bi-annually in the United States. Campus DJ invites students currently enrolled in a college or university to participate in its events.

== Format and rules ==
The Campus DJ format is similar to the NCAA basketball tournament. Top college DJs and music producers compete at events in local college markets, before advancing onto the National Semi-Finals, and then the National Finale. The events reward winning college DJs with cash prizes, gear, and exposure. The tour is also a sister-event to Campus MovieFest and previously also the College Battle of the Bands tours.

== Notable past participants ==
- 2018: DJ Vicious (CSUN)
- 2017: Matsu & Flores (Indiana U)
- 2017: Yi (Texas State U)
- 2015: Almand (Ithaca College)
- 2015: DJ Kurr (Florida State University)
- 2015: Jill Strange (Columbia College – Chicago)
- 2014: Y2K (record producer) (ASU)
- 2013: Flaxo, now known as Wingtip (Columbia U)
- Nate Howard Intro, MC and Host
- Flula Borg, MC and Host

== Notable partnerships and prize partners ==
- Monster Energy Outbreak Tour
- College Football Playoff
- Chegg
- Universal Music Group
- Campus MovieFest
- Tinder (application)
- Fiverr
- Mini Countryman
- Chipotle Mexican Grill

== Notable past guest judges or headliners ==
- Lupe Fiasco
- The Crystal Method
- The Chainsmokers
- Fetty Wap
- Grand Wizzard Theodore
- Cash Cash
- MAKJ
- Arty (musician)
- Mick Boogie
- Carnage (DJ)
- Elephante
- DJ Jayceeoh
- Skratch Bastid
- 3lau
- tyDi
- Andre Drummond
- ESPN's Music Director
