= College Battle of the Bands =

Battle of the bands competition

- Industry: Music
- Founded: 2009
- Founders: Campus MovieFest, Evan Shapiro, CyKiK.
- Website: www.collegebattle.com

College Battle of the Bands (CBoB) was a college-specific national battle of the bands competition in the United States that ran from 2009-2012. As of 2010 it was the only nationwide competition of its kind. Initially known as Campus MusicFest, CBoB was originally part of Campus MovieFest (CMF) before becoming a separate entity. Like CMF, CBoB invited students actively enrolled in a college or university to participate in its events. The tour also helped pave the way for the launch of Campus DJ in 2013.

== Format and rules ==
The College Battle of the Bands format was similar to the annual NCAA basketball tournament. Top college bands and music artists competed in local battles, before advancing onto the National Semi-Finals, and then the National Finale, which was held annually at the end of each school year. The free events reward winning artists with cash prizes, free gear, and exposure, including opportunities to open up for headliners during College Battle of the Bands' annual promotional tours. Flula Borg acts as CBoB's official host and MC at the events.

== Notable past participants ==
- The Lonely Biscuits (Belmont U), 2012 Southeast Region Winner and National Finalist
- Rozzi Crane (USC), 2011 SoCal Region Winner and National Finalist
- John King (country singer) Band (UGA), 2011 Southeast Region Winner and National Finalist
- Mike Posner (Duke), 2009 National Finalist
- Local Natives (Pepperdine), 2009 Regional Winner and National Finalist
- Raquel Rodriguez (USC), 2012 National Winner
- Land of Pines (U of Washington), 2011 National Winner
- Beyond This Point - now part of Jon Bellion's band (Five Towns College), 2010 National Finalist
- Brandon O. Bailey (Memphis) - 2011 Regional Finalist
- Jacob Snider (Columbia U) - 2010 National Finalist
- Apple Trees & Tangerines - members now comprise Flint Eastwood and Behold the Brave (Lee U), 2010 National Winner
- The Shadowboxers (Emory U), 2010 Regional Finalist
- John-Allison Weiss (UGA), 2009 National Finalist
- Daylight Broadcast (Lamar U), 2009 National Winner
- Flula Borg, MC and Host

== Textbooks and Tickets / Back to School Tours ==
College Battle of the Bands organizes annual university tours throughout North America, focusing on student interaction and give-a-aways, including free concert tickets. Concerts are put on by the promotion at prominent local venues at the end of each state's visit, and have featured artists such as T-Pain, Avicii, Big Boi (of OutKast), Chiddy Bang, Dev, Big Sean, and past College Battle of the Bands finalists. The free, student exclusive, concerts have also featured sets by DJ Rhythm (ESPN College GameDay's Official Tour DJ), and Scion Hypeman Champion Flula Borg.

== Notable partnerships ==
- Campus MovieFest
- Monster Energy Outbreak Tour
- Chegg
- SESAC
- GrammyU
- Stickam
- Campus DJ
- Live Nation
