= Childs Restaurant (Boardwalk) =

Building in Brooklyn, New York

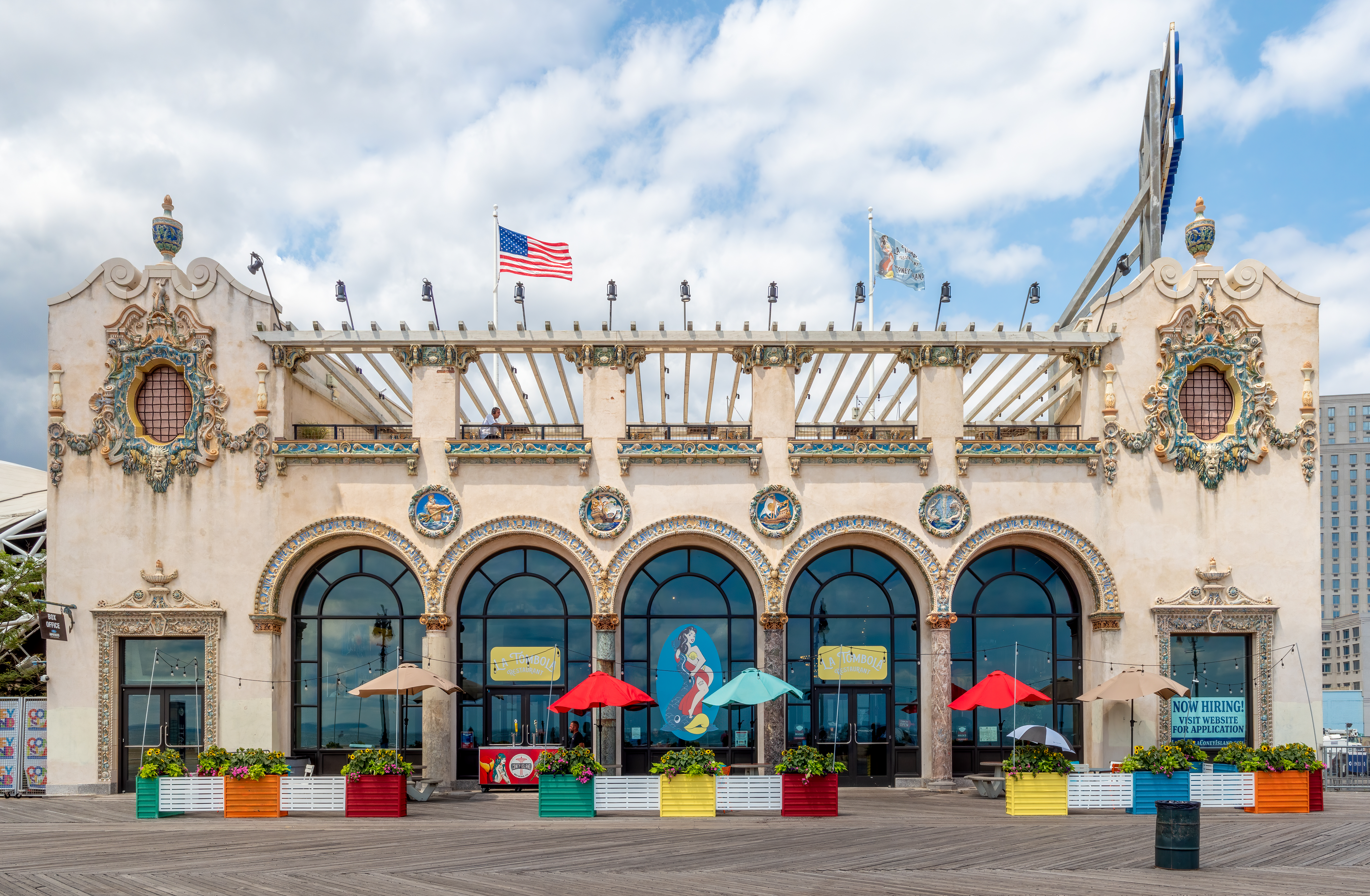
- Facade from the Coney Island Boardwalk in 2021
- Interactive map of the Childs Restaurant area

General information
- Coordinates: 40.5725°N 73.9876°W
- Current tenants: Ford Amphitheater at Coney Island
- Opened: 1923
- Renovated: 2016

The Childs Restaurant Building on the Boardwalk is a New York City designated landmark on the Riegelmann Boardwalk at West 21st Street in Coney Island, Brooklyn, New York City. It was completed in 1923 for Childs Restaurants, an early restaurant chain and one of the largest in the United States at that time. It was designed in a "resort style with Spanish Revival influence" with colorful exterior terra cotta ornamentation that references its seaside location, with depictions of Poseidon, sailing ships, and sea creatures. It was a very large restaurant, with three stories and a roof garden.

Childs vacated the property in 1952. The building was used as a candy factory for over 50 years but was vacant and in bad repair until it was converted into the Ford Amphitheater at Coney Island in 2013–2015.

A considerably smaller prior Childs location in Coney Island, built in 1917 at Surf Avenue and West 12th Street and also a designated New York City landmark, survived as a Childs until 1943. Today it is owned by Coney Island USA, an arts organization.

== Description ==
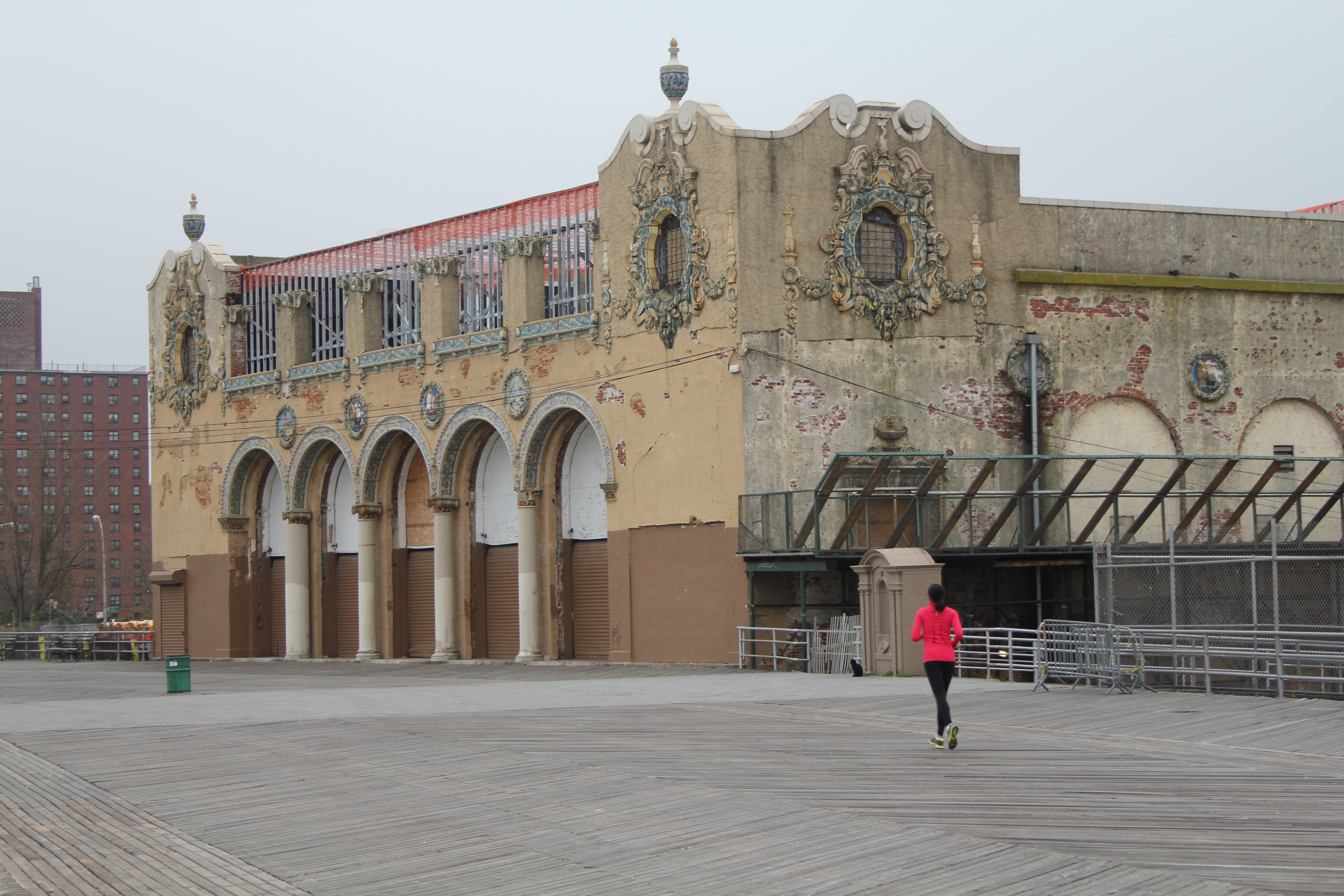
Building seen from slightly to the east in 2013, before restoration

The building stretches for about 100 feet (30 m) along the Boardwalk and 250 ft (76 m) along West 21st Street, and contains three stories plus a roof garden. According to property records, it has a total of about 60,000 sq ft (5,600 m^{2}) of floor space. It was built in 1923 to provide reasonably-priced meals to the millions of city dwellers who came to Coney Island to enjoy its beaches and amusements, and to stroll along its Boardwalk, which was constructed the same year. Most visitors arrived on the New York City Subway, whose Coney Island–Stillwell Avenue station opened in 1920.

== History ==
=== Operation ===
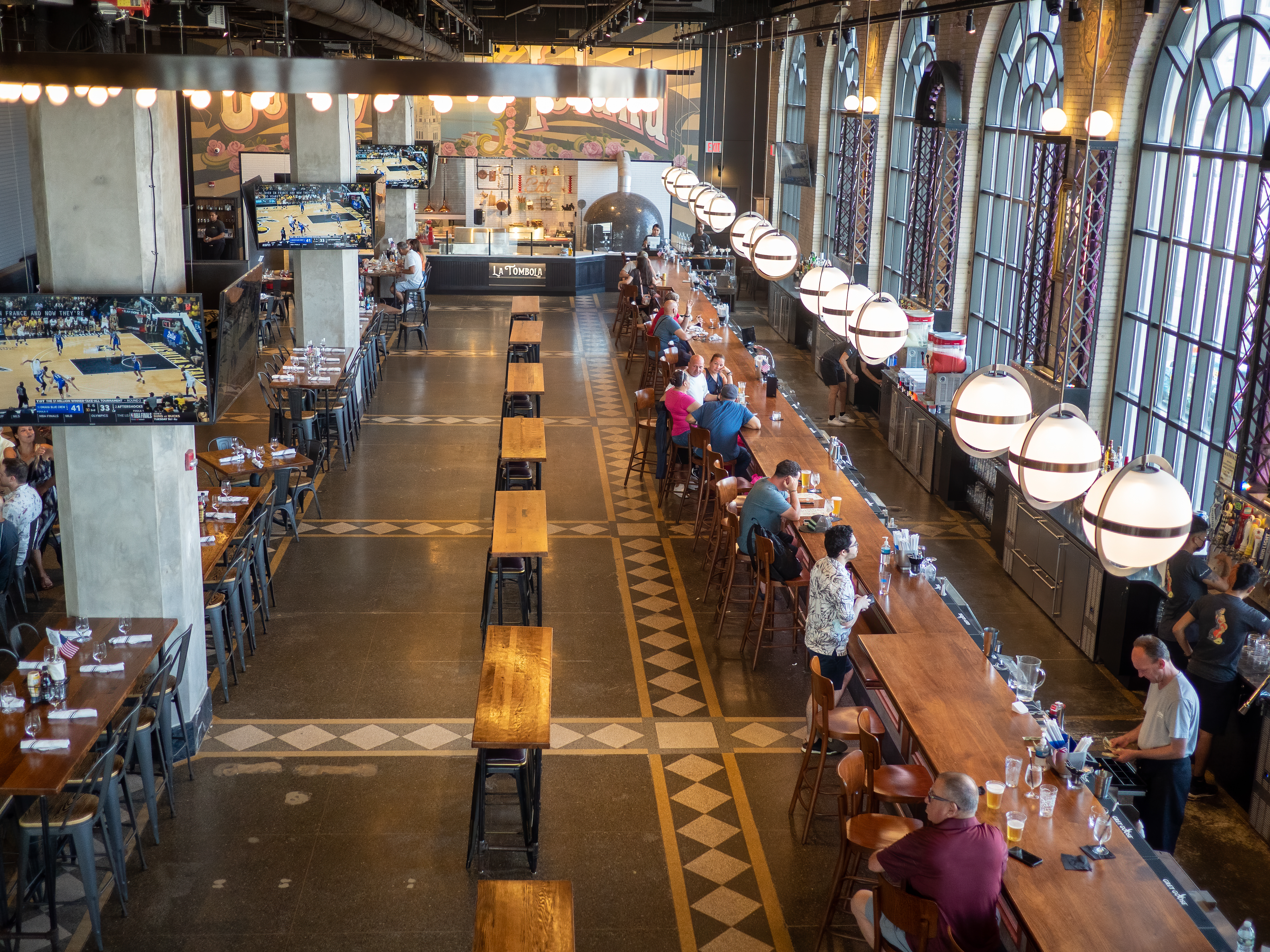
Building interior in 2021

From its earliest days, Childs' interiors were characterized by high-quality materials such as white tile walls and floors, marble communal tables, and modern electric lighting and fans. Most locations were in storefronts and other rented quarters that the company did not control, but when the company started to build locations specifically to be Childs restaurants the company demanded similar quality in its exterior architecture. To design its Boardwalk location, the company chose the firm of Hirons and Dennison, which was well-regarded for its prior works, mostly bank buildings, in the Neoclassical and Beaux-Arts styles. The firm often worked with a sculptor and with the Atlantic Terra Cotta Company to produce decorative terra cotta panels that they incorporated into their designs. It used these techniques for its design of the Boardwalk building too, though the "Spanish Revival" style was something of a departure for it.

The Boardwalk restaurant and its design proved so popular that it was used as a model for subsequent Childs locations, especially for one built in 1927 on Atlantic City's boardwalk. Though Childs had long operated in urban environments in Manhattan and elsewhere, the public came to associate the Childs name with the seashore, due largely to the size and prominence of the Coney Island Boardwalk location. Childs furthered this association in the late 1920s and early 1930s by using a nautical motif for new buildings that were far from the seashore, such as one in Manhattan, and two in Woodside, Queens.

Coney Island became less popular in the 1940s and 1950s as new trends in travel and entertainment made other areas more attractive. Many Coney Island businesses closed in this period, and Childs closed the Boardwalk location in 1952. The building itself was then purchased by the Ricci family for use as a candy factory. At that time it was just one of several candy factories in the area, and one of the products made over the years in the old Childs building were the Peeps line of marshmallow candies. Candy making was still going on within the building at the beginning of the 21st century, but the activity had apparently ceased by 2008, when the building began to be used as a roller skating rink called Dreamland Roller Rink. The roller rink was operated by Dianna Carlin, professionally known as Lola Star, a community activist and T-Shirt designer who runs the popular boardwalk gift shop Lola Star Boutique. The owners of the building decided to discontinue that new use in 2010.

=== Redevelopment ===
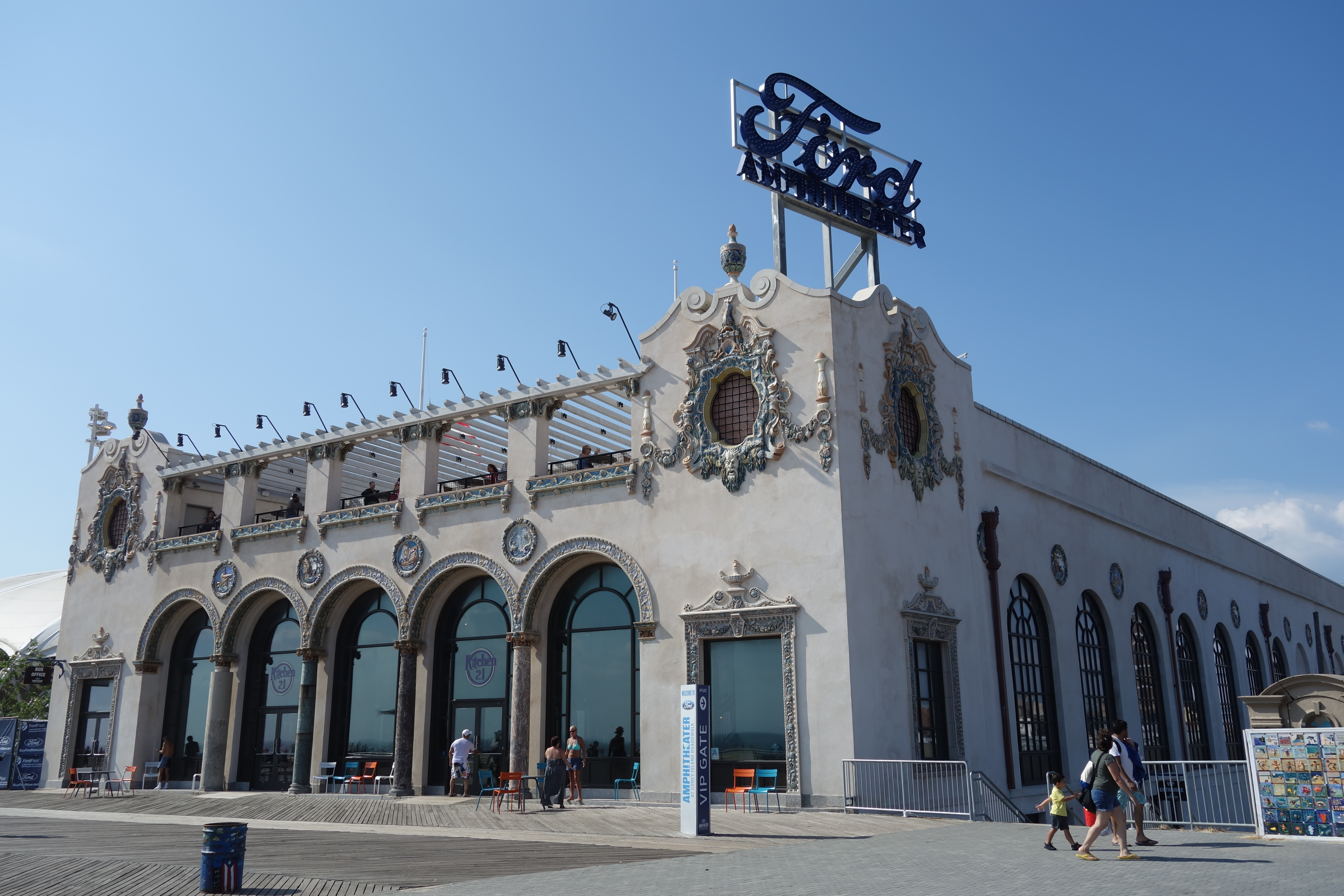
Restaurant in 2018 following renovations

The impetus for the adaptive reuse of the Childs building largely came from Marty Markowitz, who was Borough President of Brooklyn from 2002 to 2013. Markowitz had long sought a permanent venue for the series of summer concerts that he had sponsored for 35 years since his time in the New York State Senate. In December 2013, days before Markowitz's term as borough president ended, the New York City Council approved plans to redevelop the building as part of an entertainment venue called the "Seaside Park and Community Arts Center". The city originally expected completion by mid-2015. The venue, the Ford Amphitheater at Coney Island, opened on July 1, 2016.

A new amphitheater stage was built on the western side of the building. The completed amphitheater contains backstage space, a box office, and a restaurant, the first one to operate on the site for over sixty years. An adjacent green space called Seaside Park is also under construction. The La Tombola restaurant opened at the building in June 2021, from the Russo family that also runs Gargiulo's Italian Restaurant.

== Landmark status ==
In 2002, the New York City Landmarks Preservation Commission designated the building a landmark, affording it a high degree of protection against demolition. The Ricci family originally opposed the designation, and then rescinded that opposition.

== In film ==
In the 2002 romantic comedy Two Weeks Notice, Sandra Bullock plays a lawyer who wants to preserve the Coney Island community center of her childhood. The restaurant is used for the filming location of the "community center" .

== Gallery ==
Childs Restaurant at Riegelmann Boardwalk
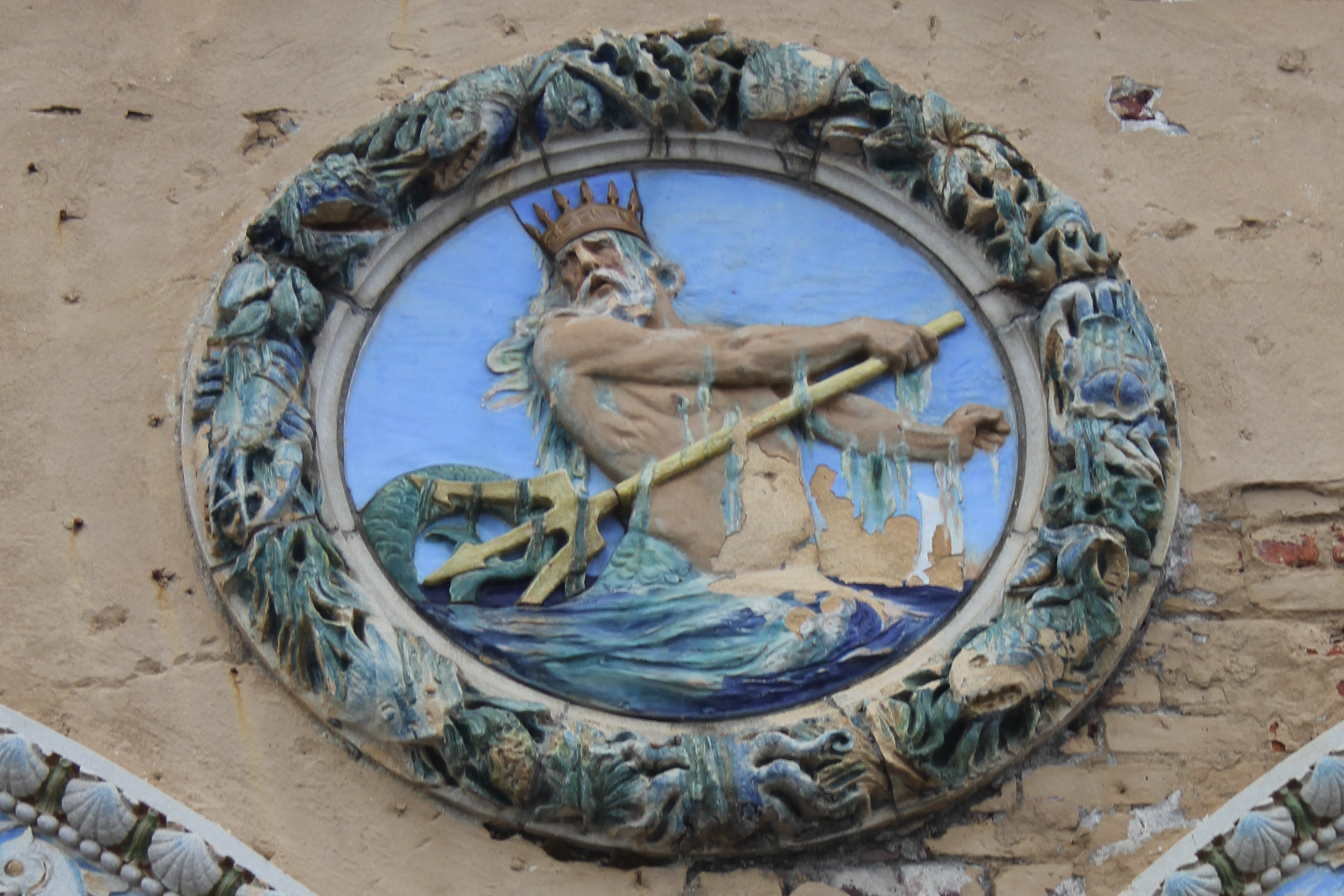
Poseidon and trident

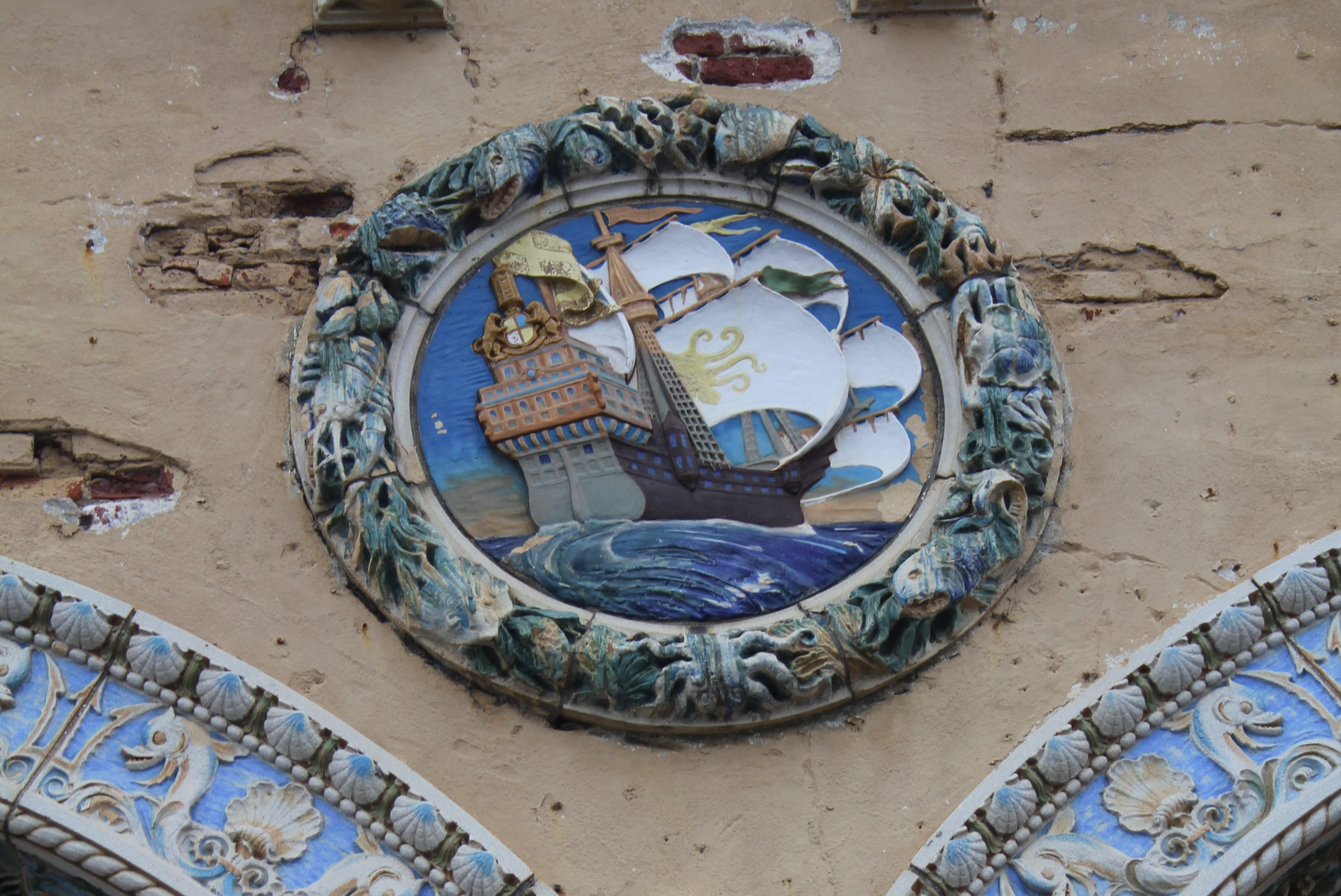
Sailing ship

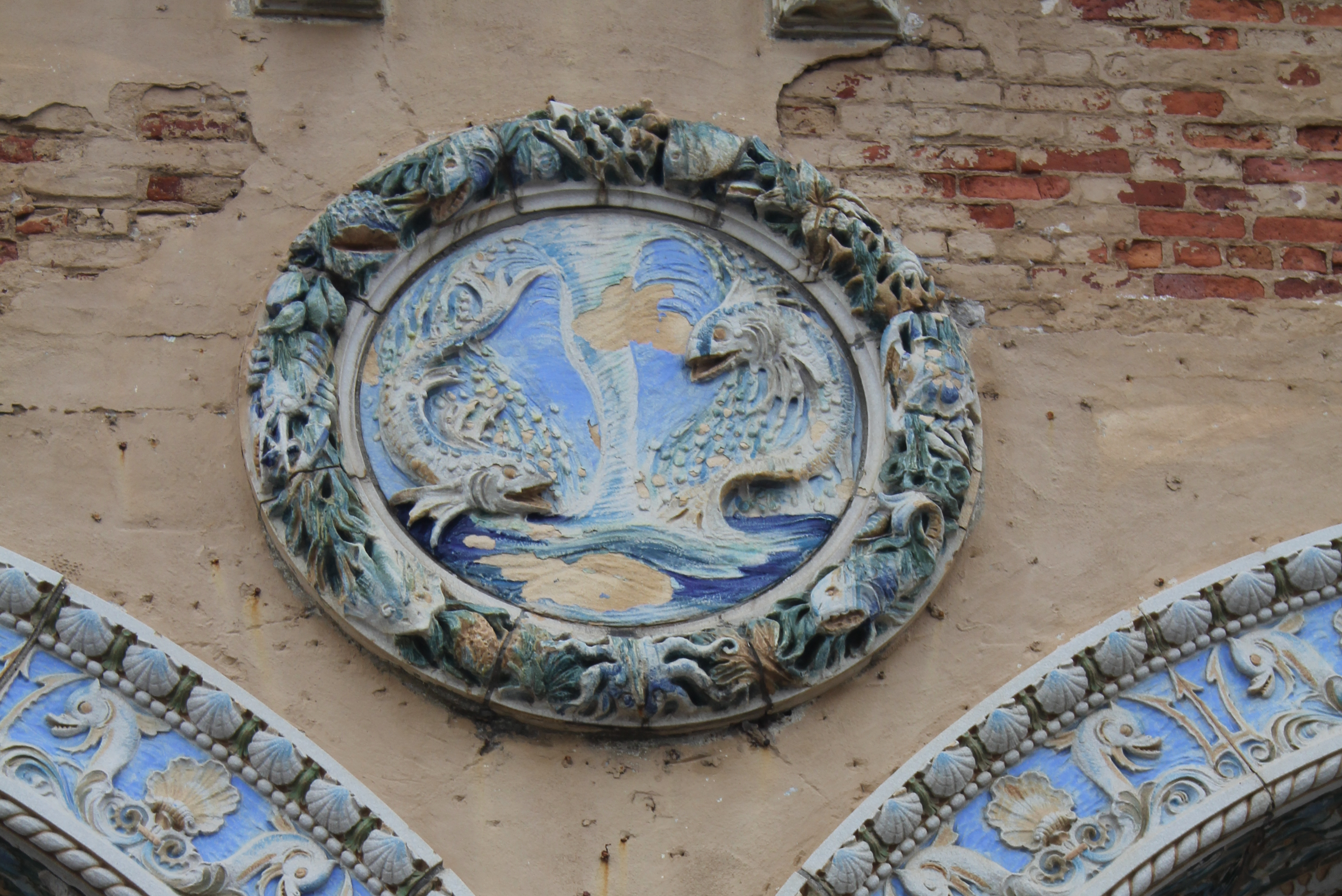
Sea creatures

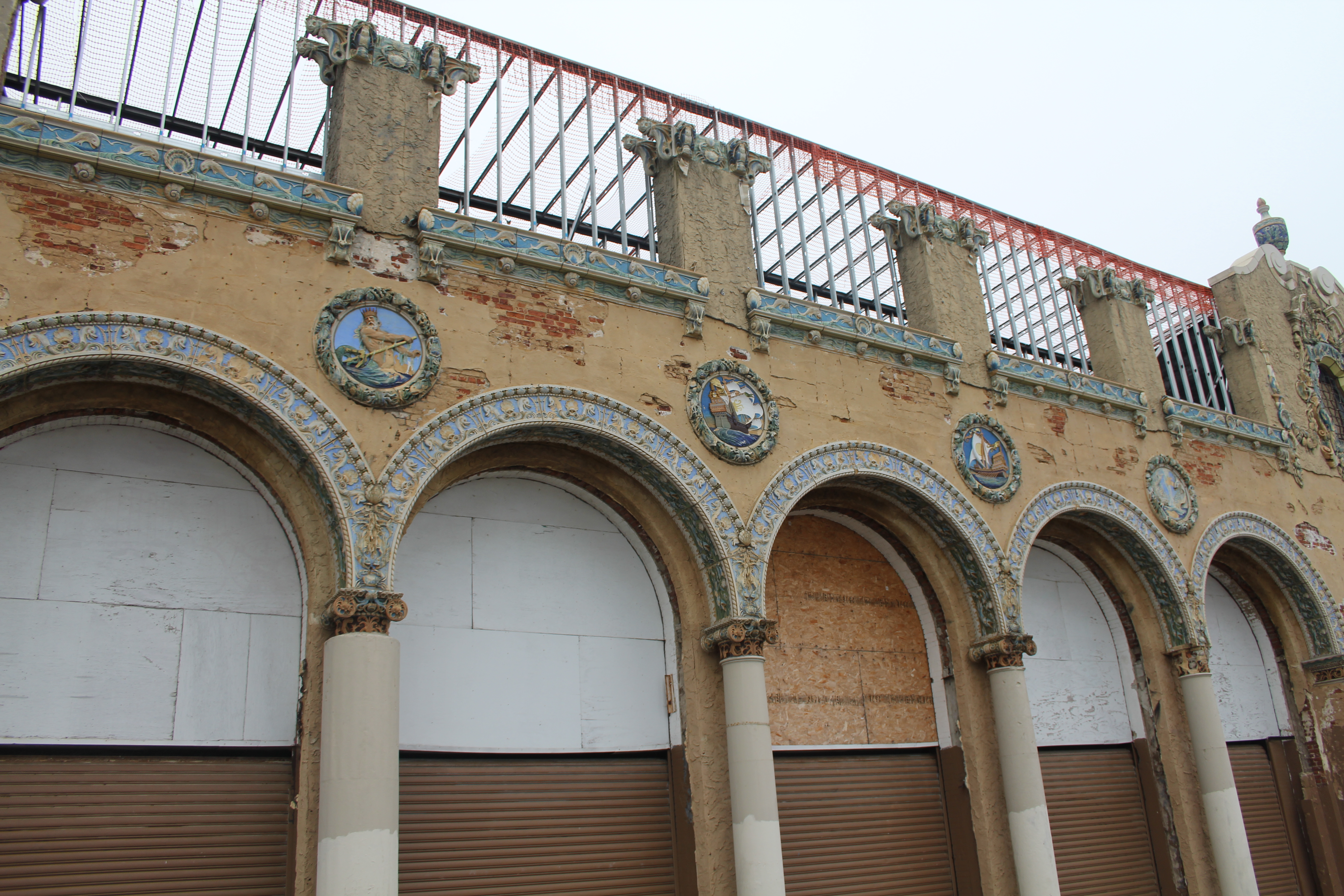
Terra cotta panels and archways

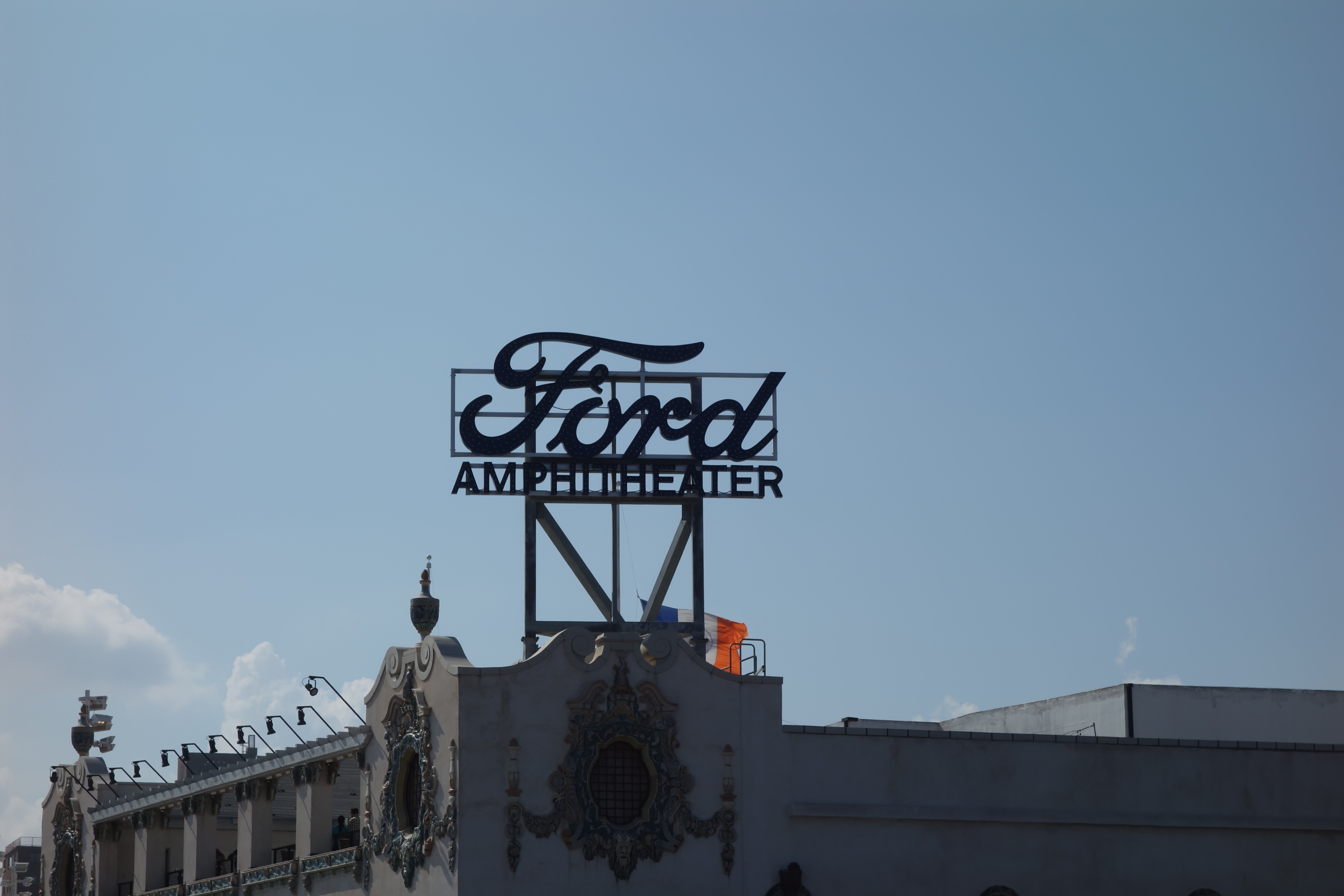
Sign for the Ford Amphitheater atop the restaurant

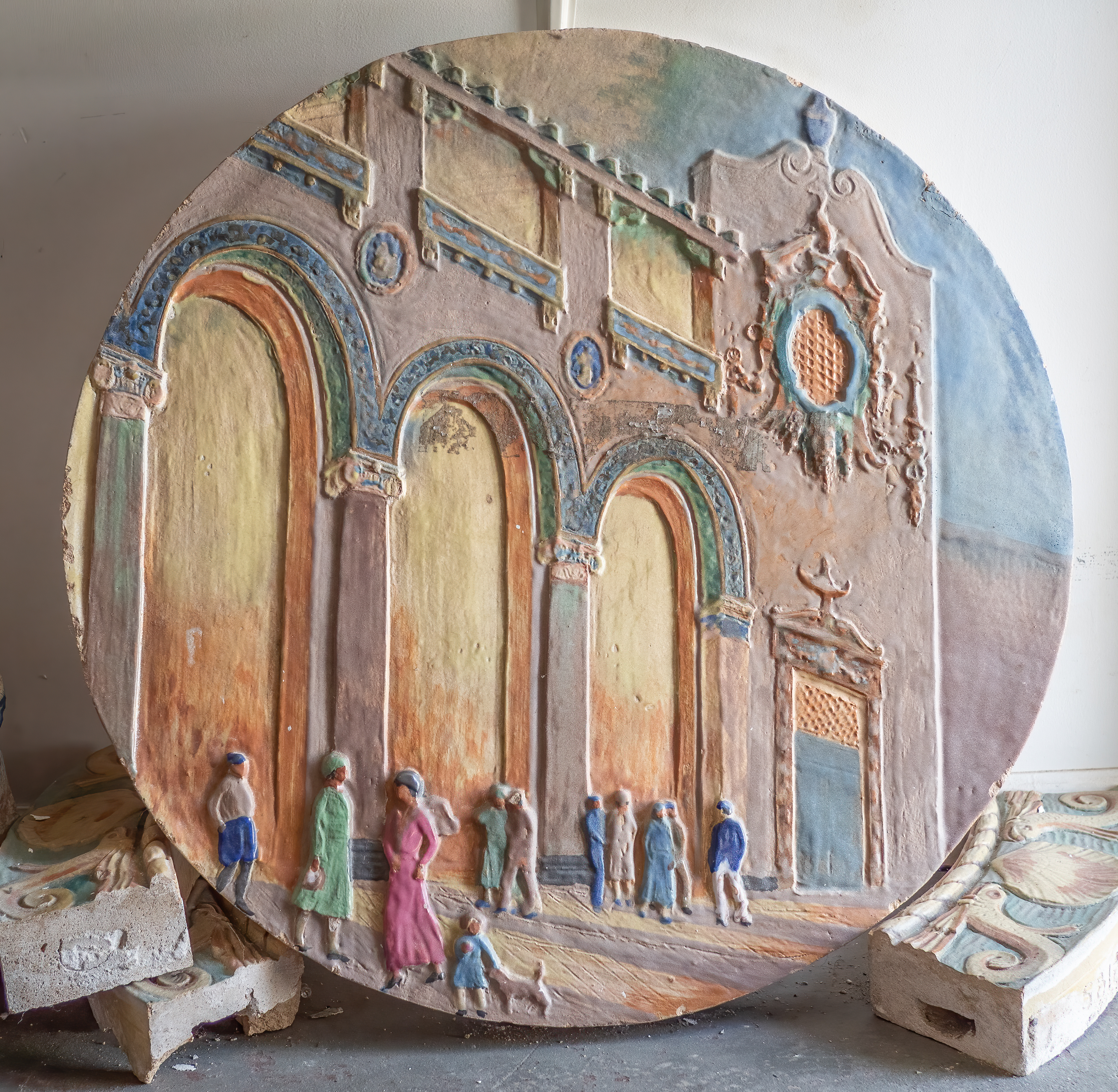
Terracotta relief of the restaurant, seen at the Coney Island History Project
Media related to Childs Restaurants (Riegelmann Boardwalk location) at Wikimedia Commons
