= Joseph Sitt =

American real estate investor (born 1974)

Joseph J. Sitt
- Born: 1974 (age 51–52); Brooklyn, New York
- Education: Yeshivah of Flatbush
- Occupation: Real estate developer
- Known for: Founder of Ashley Stewart; Founder and President of Thor Equities Group
- Children: 4
- Website: http://www.thorequities.com/

Joseph J. Sitt (born 1974) is an American real estate investor, founder of the retail chain Ashley Stewart, and founder of global real estate company Thor Equities.

== Early life and education ==
Sitt was born in 1974 near Coney Island, Brooklyn to a Syrian Jewish family. He began working at a young age in flea market booths at the Aqueduct and Roosevelt racetrack parking lots in the New York City area. The experience gave Sitt a better understanding of inner city commerce, and showed him the underserved nature of the market. At age 11, Sitt became interested in real estate when his only choice was to go to Manhattan to buy an Atari computer because he couldn't get one in Brooklyn. This eventually led Sitt to study business at New York University's Stern School of Business; he founded Thor Equities in 1986 before graduating.

== Career ==
Sitt picked the name Thor for the company because he was an avid Thor comic book fan and thought it would fit his "concept of being the protector of the cities." His first investment was a property sold at tax auction on East Tremont Avenue in the Bronx, a chronically underserved retail area, where he built a one-story retail structure with money from "family, friends, roommates, parents of roommates." He proceeded to secure national retailers Rite Aid Pharmacy, Payless Shoes, and Rainbow Shops. In 1989, partnering with Joseph Chehabar of the family that owned Rainbow Shops, he purchased for $30 million the 161-store Children's Place retail chain and the 41-store Accessory Place retail chain from the Campeau Corporation. As part of the transaction, they then sold Accessory Place to Tribeca Corporation.

In December 2024, Thor Equities and Barington Capital Group urged Macy's to create a separate real estate unit as part of a shareholder-value proposal.

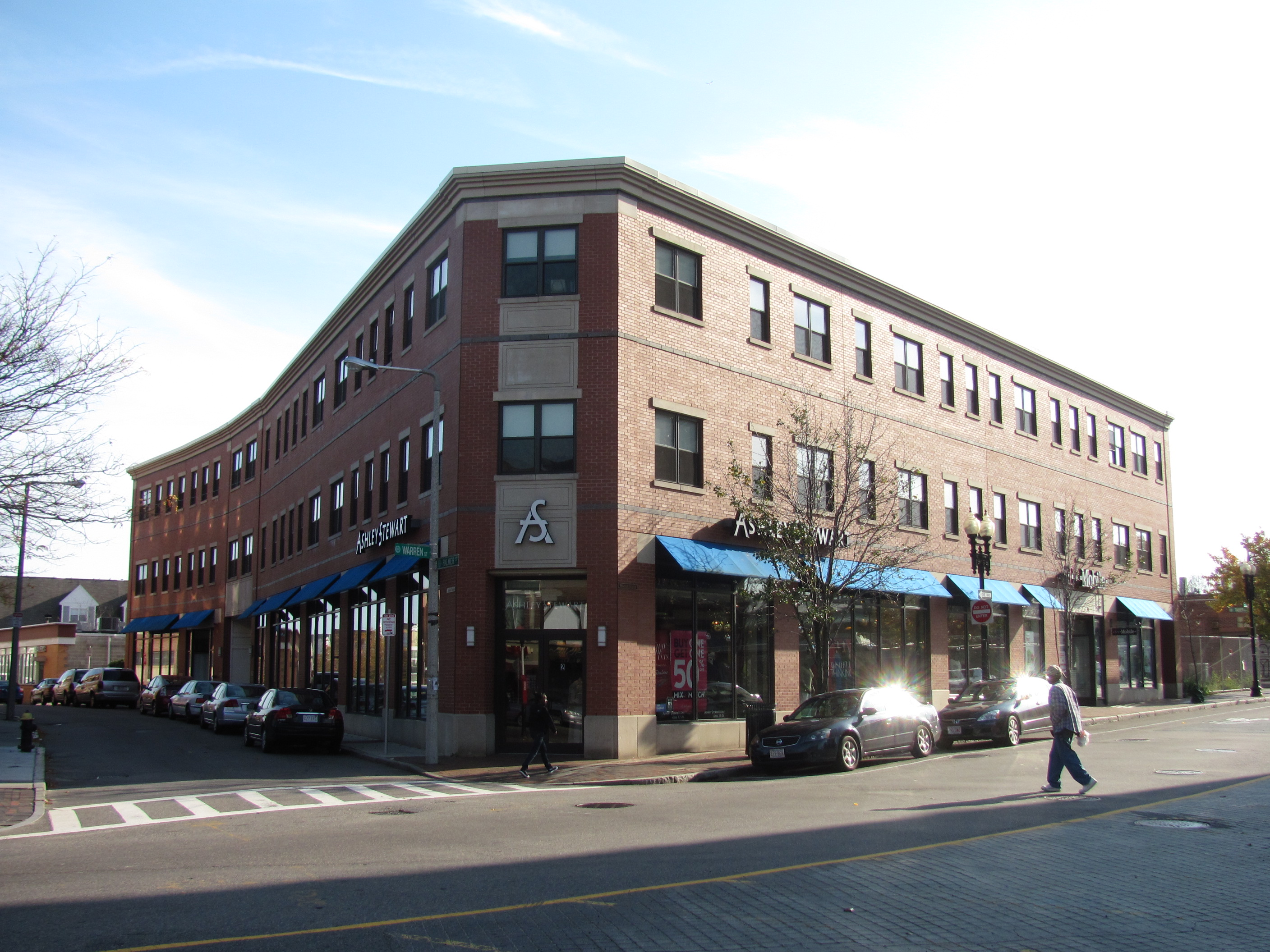
Ashley Stewart in Roxbury, Massachusetts

In 1991 Sitt founded Ashley Stewart (a name inspired by Laura Ashley and Martha Stewart) which sold modern and fashionable plus-size clothing to urban women. Each Ashley Stewart store hired from within the community, and the company was recognized by President Clinton for its contribution to the nation's innovative Welfare to Work program. After acquiring 98 stores for $61.25 million in 1998 from the bankrupt Petrie Retail Inc. (founded by Milton Petrie), Ashley Stewart grew to over 380 stores in more than 100 cities, which prompted many national retailers to follow suit and helped change the urban retail landscape. As part of the transaction with Petrie Retail, Sitt acquired Marianne Stores, a retail outlet specializing in clothing for Latina women. Sitt sold his interest in 2000 to concentrate on urban real estate through his company Thor Equities.

In 2004, Sitt was profiled by Crains in its annual "40 Under 40" article, which reported that he had a 6 million square-foot portfolio worth nearly $750 million. In 2010, he started a brokerage business called Thor High Street (Thor Retail Advisors) that focuses on retail leasing.

Today, Thor Equities is a real estate development, leasing and management firm with headquarters in New York City, London and Mexico City. The company owns property in the United States, Canada, Europe, Russia, India and Latin America, with portfolio transactions and a development pipeline in excess of $10 billion and totaling more than 20 million square feet.

== Non Profit Activities and Honors ==
=== Global Gateway Alliance ===
Joseph Sitt is the chairman and founder of the not-for-profit Global Gateway Alliance (GGA), which was created in 2012 to address the infrastructure challenges that New York metropolitan area airports face. Sitt made an initial $1 million donation to start the group, which seeks to make New York's airports among the best in the world.

On July 27, 2015, Vice President Joseph Biden and Gov. Andrew Cuomo announced plans to modernize JFK and LaGuardia airports, which included many of the features Sitt and GGA long called for, including new terminals, greater passenger amenities, and increased transportation access. Accordingly, GGA Chairman Joseph Sitt stated this was "an important step in bringing New York’s airports into the 21st century, and a win for the more than 117 million annual passengers that use our airports and for a regional economy that relies on the airports for more than $50 billion in activity."

=== Coney Art Walls ===
In May 2015, Thor Equities Group Chairman Joseph Sitt provided a $4 million donation to establish Coney Art Walls, an outdoor museum of street art curated by Mr. Sitt and Jeffrey Deitch. Located at 3050 Stillwell Avenue in Coney Island, the public art wall project features renowned local and international artists including Crash, Daze, Lee Quiñones, Ron English and Miss Van. Coney Art Walls returned in 2016 with 21 new murals, and again in 2017 and 2018.

=== Additional philanthropy and awards ===
Joseph Sitt is an active board member of the Bedford Stuyvesant Restoration Corporation, one of the most respected community development organizations in the United States. He was instrumental in helping restore Restoration Plaza, the neighborhood's Town Square and the BSRC's main asset, and bringing to the area more retail options including its first family sit-down restaurant and supermarket. In 2007, Harvard professor Michael Porter and the Initiative for a Competitive Inner City (ICIC) honored him for his commitment to fostering healthy competitive business conditions and new opportunities in inner city neighborhoods.

Sitt is a managing director of Venetian Heritage, a not-for-profit organization that supports cultural projects through the conservation of Venice's historical and cultural institutions, and is Founder and Chairman of the Sephardic Heritage Museum.

Sitt is also a frequent speaker and lecturer at various universities including Columbia University, New York University, Baruch, and Notre Dame. He serves on the board of the Real Estate Roundtable in Washington D.C., the Department of Real Estate at Baruch College, and is a member of the Partnership for New York City.

Sitt has served on the boards of the Downtown Brooklyn Council economic development advocacy group, REBNY's Board of Governors, and as co-chairman of the Brooklyn Business Improvement District.

He has spent much of his career in youth development and education, serving on the Boards of Brooklyn's TAB High School and Flatbush High School, leading a teen program and acting as an ongoing mentor and guidance counselor to Brooklyn youth.

Sitt was awarded the 2014 Ernst and Young Entrepreneur of the Year Award, and has been named by New York Observer in its annual list as one of the Most Powerful People in New York Real Estate.

== Political views ==
Sitt was involved in a long-standing WhatsApp group chat from October 2023 through early May 2024 with business leaders with the stated goals of "chang[ing] the narrative" in favor of Israel and "help[ing] win the war" on U.S. public opinion following Hamas's October 7th attack on Israel. Members of the group chat discussed how they received private briefings by, and worked closely with, members of the Israeli government, including former Israeli prime minister Naftali Bennett; Benny Gantz, a member of the Israeli war cabinet; and Israel's ambassador to the United States, Michael Herzog. Group members, including Sitt, worked with the Israeli government to screen a film titled "Bearing Witness to the October 7th Massacre" which shows footage compiled by the Israel Defense Forces portraying killings committed by Hamas on October 7. Screenings of the film were conducted in New York City and on at least one college campus. On October 27, 2023, Sitt wrote in a message to the group that Israeli officials wanted to thank them for coming up with the idea of screening the film. Sitt noted that the screening would "be listed as a IDF event not affiliated to Facts for Peace to keep them separate."

Members of the 2023-2024 WhatsApp group chat, including Sitt, also held a video call in April 2024 with New York City Mayor Eric Adams in an effort to, according to reporting by The Washington Post, "pressure Columbia’s president and trustees to permit the mayor to send police to the campus" to shut down criticism of Israel's offensive military operations in Gaza, which many campus protesters, intergovernmental and non-governmental organizations, civil servants, and governments around the world have alleged to be genocide. During the video call, group members discussed making political donations to Adams. Following the video call, Sitt wrote to group members to inform them that Adams was "open to any ideas we have." About Adams, he continued, "As you saw he's ok if we hire private investigators to then have his police force intel team work with them." Through a spokesperson, Sitt declined to comment on the existence of the group chat or his involvement, but said he did not donate to Adams.

In 2026, Sitt announced that he was working to construct a building in Jerusalem for what he calls the Abraham Organization, an institution that he envisions as overseeing the implementation of the Abraham Accords.

== Personal life ==
Sitt has four sons. He lives in Bensonhurst, Brooklyn. His uncle is real estate developer Stanley Chera. Sitt is a founding member of the Sephardic Community Alliance.
