= Makj =

MAKJ
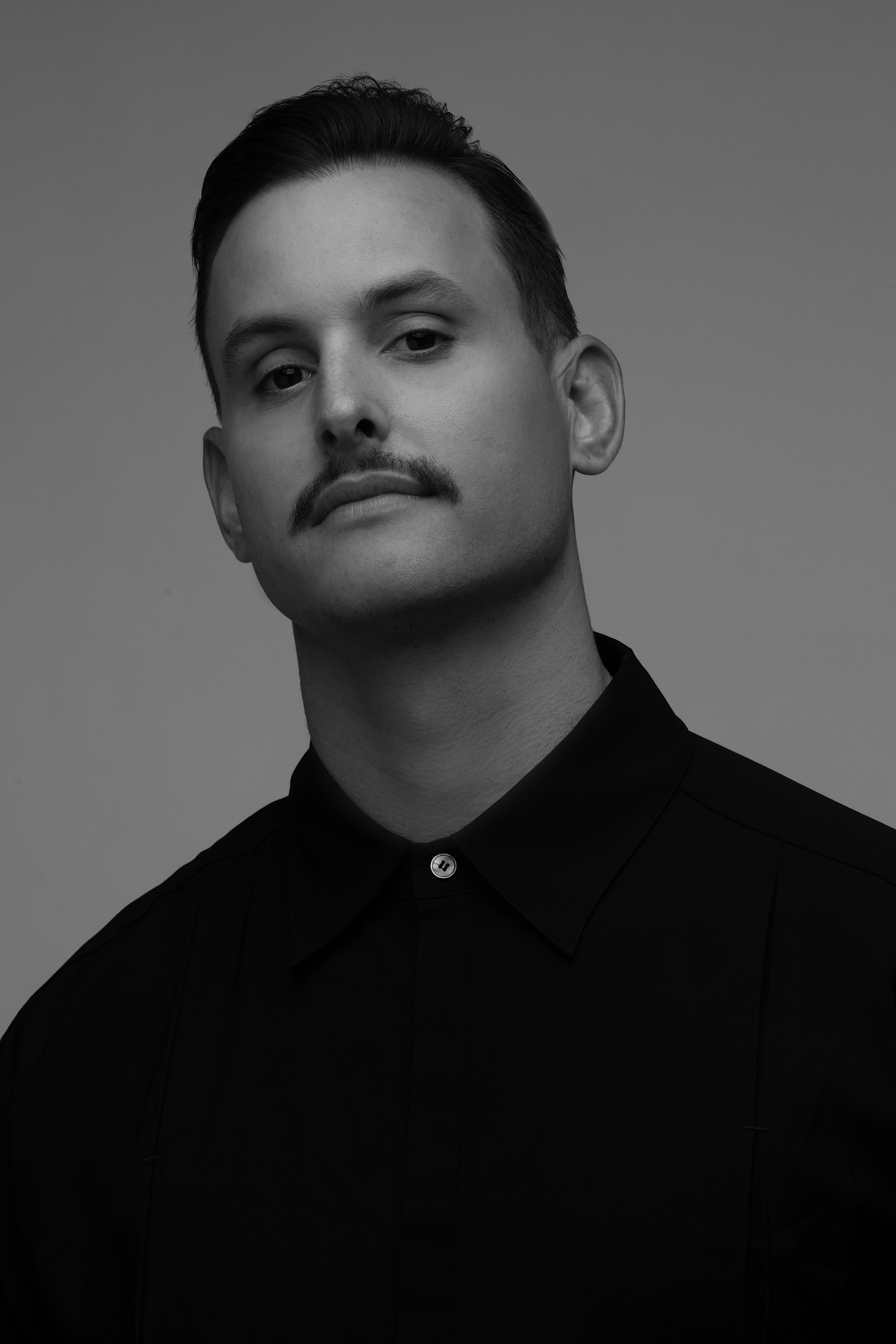

Background information
- Born: Mackenzie Alexander Johnson; June 25, 1990 (age 36); San Luis Obispo, California, United States
- Origin: San Luis Obispo, California, United States
- Genres: House music; Dance music; Electro house
- Occupations: producer, DJ
- Years active: 2011–present
- Labels: Kenz Records, Universal Records

Mackenzie Johnson, better known by his stage name Makj (stylized as MAKJ), is an American DJ and electro house music producer. He has released a number of singles as a solo artist since 2012, as well as a large number of collaborative singles with artists such as Hardwell, Lil Jon, Deorro and M35. Since 2013 Makj has performed at large festivals such as Electric Zoo, Voodoo Experience, Coachella, and a main stage slot at TomorrowWorld. In March 2014, Billboard named him one of the Top 10 Artists to Watch at Ultra Music Festival. Also in 2014 he was named No. 63 in the Top 100 DJs list put out by the DJ Magazine Awards. Makj is the host of the radio show Revolution Radio on Clear Channel’s Evolution channel.

== Biography ==
Mackenzie Johnson was born in 1990 in San Luis Obispo, California. By his teens, he was living in China while pursuing a career as a professional race car driver. At age fifteen, he became interested in DJing, and he purchased a set of Technics 1200 Turntables. By age 17, he had returned to the United States, where he found himself invited to perform at local events in his hometown. He had a number of lessons with DJ AM, who trained MAKJ on scratching.

In late 2013, MAKJ embarked on his first major US tour, traveling the country with Bingo Players and Bassjackers. After a time playing small venues, he began to attend festivals as well. Since 2013, he has performed at festivals such as Electric Zoo Festival, Voodoo Experience, Coachella, a main stage slot at TomorrowWorld, Northern Lights Festival, Euphoria Festival, Webster Hall, and Ruby Skye. In March 2014, Billboard named him one of the Top 10 Artists to Watch at Ultra Music Festival. He toured Europe in 2014 with his "Let’s Get Fucked Up Tour," then traveled North America with his "Peyote Tour." Plans for an Asian tour were also announced.

He has released a number of singles as a solo artist since 2012, as well as a large number of collaborative singles. He has collaborated with artists such as Showtek, Lil Jon, and DJ Kura. In 2013, he released a collaborative single with Hardwell entitled "Countdown" which peaked at No. 1 on Beatport within three days. He has also released music on Hysteria Records, Doorn Records, Diffused Records, and Juicy Music, among others. In late 2014, he released his track "Generic," which had earlier debuted at the Ultra Festival in Miami. Several of his original songs have charted in the Beatport Top 10.

MAKJ has been a guest judge for the Campus DJ contest, and he is the host of a radio show on Clear Channel’s Evolution channel, with the show also streaming at iHeartRadio.

== Awards and nominations ==
Year	Award	Nominated work	Category	Result
2014	DJ Magazine Awards	Makj	Top 100 DJs (63rd)	Nominated

== Singles ==
=== As lead artist ===
List of singles as lead artist, with selected chart positions, showing year released and album name
Title	Year	Peak chart positions			Certifications
Title	Year	AUS	BEL	FRA	Certifications
"Countdown" (with Hardwell)	2013	—	28	41	
"Encore" (with Henry Fong)	2013	—	—	—	
"Let's Get F*cked Up" (with Lil Jon)	2014	—	—	—	
"Derp" (with Bassjackers)	2014	—	—	—	
"Mad Max"	2015	—	—	—	
"Black" (with Thomas Newson)	2015	—	—	—	
"Party Till We Die" (with Timmy Trumpet featuring Andrew W.K.)	2016	46	—	—	
"Shakalaka" (with Steve Aoki, Deorro and Max Styler)	2018	—	—	—	
"Knockout" (with Deorro and Quintino)	2018	—	—	—	
"Bounce 2 This" (with Will K)	2018	—	—	—	
"Muñequita Linda" (with Juan Magán and Deorro, featuring YFN Lucci)	2018	—	—	—	RIAA: Gold (Latin)
"Fire" (with Linka & Mondello)	2019	—	—	—	
"Grow Like This" (with Tropkillaz and Will K featuring Demarco)	2019	—	—	—	
"Beast" (with Purari)	2019	—	—	—	
"Rave" (with Steve Aoki and Showtek featuring Kris Kiss)	2019	—	—	—	
"Retumba" (with Deorro)	2019	—	—	—	
"Left Right" (with Hardwell and Deorro featuring Fatman Scoop)	2019	—	—	—	
"Save Room For Us" (with Tinashe)	2020	—	—	—	
"Green Light"	2020	—	—	—	
"Promises" (with Jyye)	2020	—	—	—	
"Night Ends"	2021	—	—	—	
"Scream It" (with Bassjackers)	2021	—	—	—	
"Club Sound"	2022	—	—	—	
"Beautiful Life" (with Purari)	2022	—	—	—	
"De La Sol" (with Bassjackers)	2022	—	—	—	
"—" denotes a recording that did not chart or was not released in that territory.

=== Other singles ===
- 2011: Parallax (with Kura and dBerrie)
- 2012: Crunch
- 2012: Croche
- 2012: Galaxy / Old Memories (with Kura)
- 2013: Conchy
- 2013: Hold Up
- 2013: Springen
- 2013: Hakaka
- 2013: Revolution (with M35)
- 2014: GO (Showtek Edit) (with M35)
- 2014: Generic
- 2014: Ready (with Deorro)
- 2015: Lose Your Mind (with Deorro)
- 2015: Ante Up (with Deorro)
- 2015: Get Whoa (featuring Fly Boi Keno)
- 2015: On & On (with Kenze)
- 2017: Knock Me Down (with Max Styler featuring Elayna Boynton)
- 2017: Space Jam (with Michael Sparks featuring Fatman Scoop)
- 2017: Too Far Gone (featuring Matthew Santos)

=== Remixes ===
- 2012: Nari & Milani featuring Maurizio Gubellini - Unbelievable (with Robbie Rivera)
- 2012: Drop the Lime - No Sleep For The Wicked
- 2013: Trinidad James - All Gold Everything
- 2013: Nervo and Ivan Gough featuring Beverley Knight - Not Taking This No More
- 2013: Federico Scavo and Robbie Rivera - Jump
- 2013: Sound of Stereo - Zipper
- 2013: Sandro Silva featuring Jack Miz - Let Go Tonight
- 2014: Benny Benassi featuring Gary Go - Let This Last Forever
- 2015: O.T. Genasis - CoCo
- 2016: Rae Sremmurd - Black Beatles
- 2016: Madly - Work Me
- 2017: Ed Sheeran - Shape of You
- 2017: Future - Mask Off
- 2017: Steve Aoki featuring Lil Yachty and Migos - Night Call (with Steve Aoki)
- 2019: Goody Grace featuring Blink-182 - Scumbag
- 2020: Winona Oak - He Don't Love Me
- 2020: Rat City - I Just Wanna Dance
