= The Lonely Biscuits =

American indie band

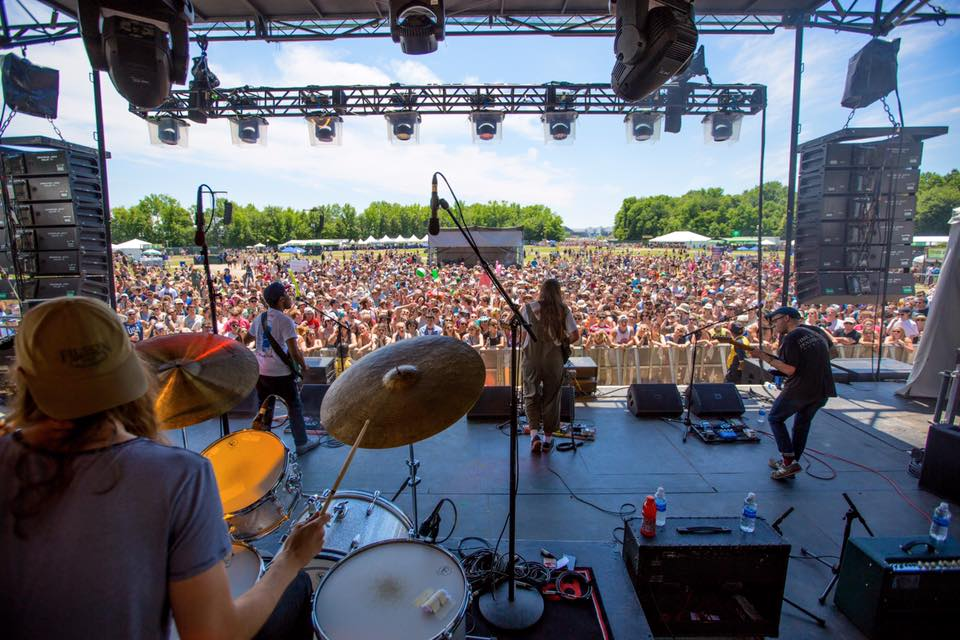
- The Lonely Biscuits performing at Firefly Music Festival in Dover, Delaware, June 2016

Background information
- Origin: Nashville, Tennessee
- Genres: Indie, funk, soul, hip hop, pop
- Years active: 2011–present
- Labels: Independent record label
- Members: Grady Wenrich; Sam Gidley; Nick Byrd
- Website: www.thelonelybiscuits.com

The Lonely Biscuits are an American indie band. The band currently consists of Grady Wenrich (vocals, guitar), Sam Gidley (drums) and Nick Byrd (bass). The Lonely Biscuits formed in September 2011 at Belmont University in Nashville, Tennessee, where Grady Wenrich and Sam Gidley were roommates. John Paterini, former singer/guitarist, came into the picture later in the month after hearing some of their music from his dorm room across the hall. Two months later, Nick Byrd joined the band as an official "biscuit" playing bass guitar.

== History ==
=== Gravy and the Biscuits ===
The Lonely Biscuits was formed in September 2011 by Grady Wenrich and Sam Gidley, who were random roommates at Belmont University. John Paterini lived across the hall and heard them playing music. John's voice blended well with Grady's rap and the band formed under the name "Gravy and the Biscuits." The band quickly became known for their unusual blend of soul, funk, hip hop and pop, with their first release "Butter" quickly reaching 25,000 views on YouTube. About a month after the release they played their first live show at 'Elberta,' a Belmont student-house known for parties and live shows. Hundreds of Belmont students came to see them perform. They soon released an EP by the name of "Soul Food" which they made available as a free download.

=== The Lonely Biscuits ===
Shortly after the release of "Soul Food", Nick Byrd joined the band as an official "biscuit" playing bass guitar. The band also ran into potential legal issues with the name "Gravy and the Biscuits" and changed their name to "The Lonely Biscuits." They recorded and released a new single, "Chasin' Echoes," with an accompanying video. This release became one of their most downloaded songs and increased their exposure. The single was included on their follow-up EP, "Biscuit Buffet."

In 2012 the band entered the College Battle of the Bands and won the Southeast regional title. The band went on to the finals in Los Angeles and took some time to play concerts in southern California. 2013 began with a nomination from MTV for the first ever MTVu College Artist Woodie. Online voting opened in February and the band was announced as the winner in early March.

2015 brought about a major lineup change for the band. After a highly successful summer tour, John Paterini decided to leave the band to finish his education and pursue other creative endeavors. John's departure from the band was announced via Instagram on 8 October 2015. The Lonely Biscuits moved forward with the remaining three original members and their next EP, Come Around, was released later that month containing new material without John's influence. Fall and Winter tours included Robbie Jackson from Keeps as a live guitar player.

=== Hurricane Sandy Relief ===
In late 2012, the band was personally affected by Hurricane Sandy: Grady Wenrich originally came from the New Jersey coastal area devastated by the hurricane. The band decided to release a song recorded in the summer of 2012, in Normandy Beach, NJ, along with an accompanying video. The song, "Everybody," was well-received and the band collected more than $3,000 in donations. All proceeds from the song were donated to hurricane relief on the New Jersey coast.

== Musical style and influences ==
The Lonely Biscuits blend several genres of music to produce their sound; influences cited include Sublime, Beastie Boys, Jurassic 5, G. Love, and Jack White.

== Discography ==
- Soul Food (EP, 2011)
- Biscuit Buffet (EP, 2012)
- A Girl Named Destiny (EP, 2013) - debuted at #25 on the iTunes Alternative Chart
- Things Sure Have Changed (EP, 2013) - debuted at #36 on the iTunes Alternative Chart
- Come Around (EP, 2015)
- The Universe in You (Album, 2018)

== Awards and nominations ==
=== MTVu Woodie Awards ===
The MTVu Woodie Awards, is an annual music award show which recognizes "the music voted best by college students."

| Year | Nominee / work | Award | Result |
|---|---|---|---|
| 2013 | The Lonely Biscuits | College Artist of the Year (First Year Award) | Won |

== Band members ==
- Grady "Gravy" Wenrich - vocals, guitar
- Sam Gidley - drums
- Nick Byrd - Bass

== Former Band Members ==
- John Paterini - vocals, guitar
