= Childs Restaurant (Surf Avenue) =

Building in Brooklyn, New York

Childs Restaurant Building
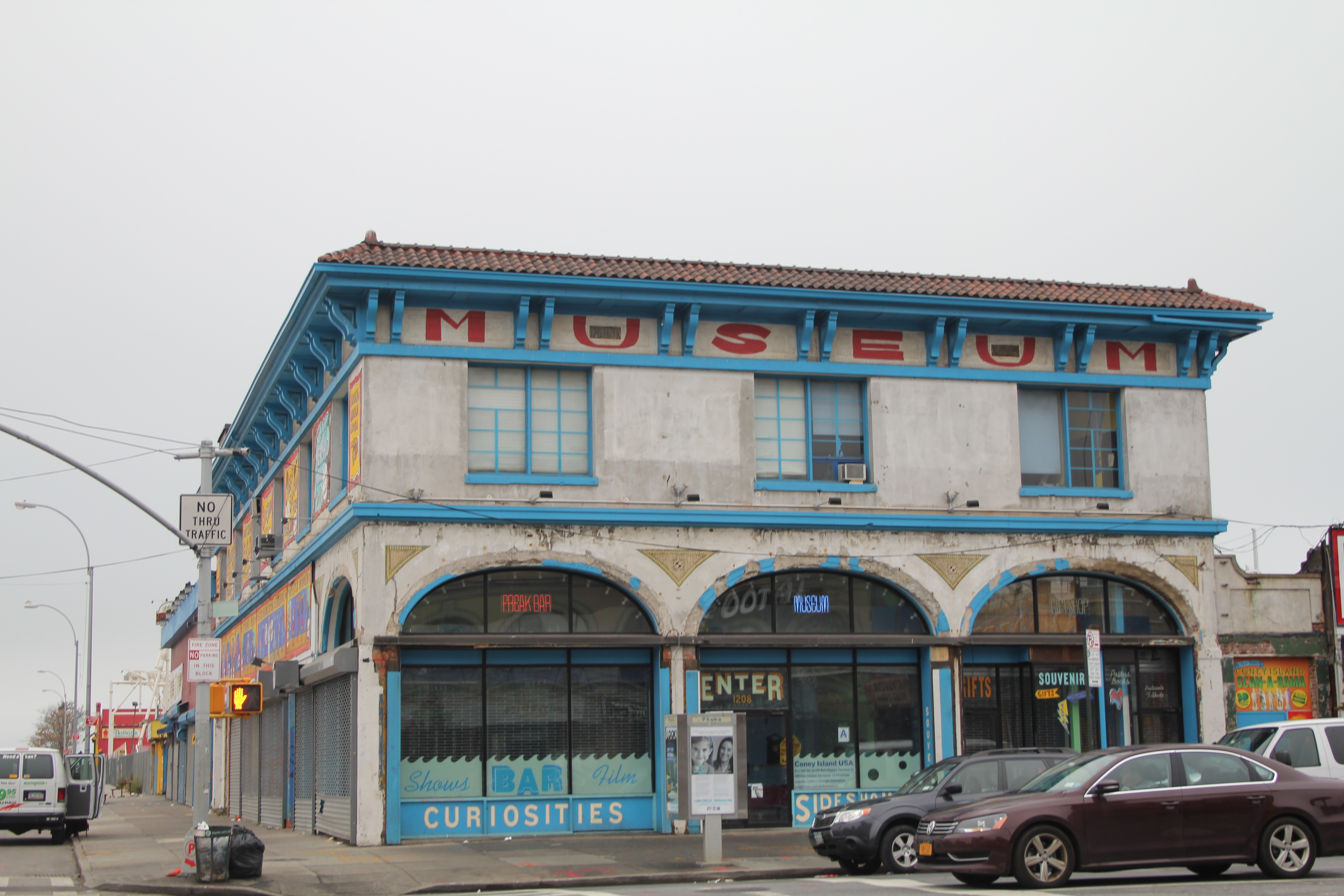
- Facade from Surf Avenue
- Interactive map of Childs Restaurant Building
- Location: Brooklyn, New York, United States
- Coordinates: 40.5753°N 73.9798°W
- Length: 110 ft (34 m)
- Width: 63 ft (19 m)
- Established: 1917
- Website: http://ConeyIsland.com

The Childs Restaurant Building on Surf Avenue is a New York City designated landmark on Surf Avenue at West 12th Street in Coney Island, Brooklyn. It was completed in 1917 for Childs Restaurants, an early restaurant chain and one of the largest in the United States at that time. Its design, by John Westervelt, Childs' in-house architect, shows "elements of the Spanish Revival style." The company built a much larger Childs location on the Coney Island Boardwalk in 1923, but continued to operate the Surf Avenue location until 1943.

In later years, the building was used for other restaurants and nightclubs. In 2007 the property was acquired by Coney Island USA, a local arts organization that is headquartered in the building, which currently houses a theater, a bar, and exhibition, and office space. The building was designated a New York City landmark in 2010.

The building sustained considerable damage from Hurricane Sandy in late 2012. With the help of many volunteers, Coney Island USA repaired the worst of the damage and reoccupied the building by the following April.
