= Love In, Love Out =

Book

Love In, Love Out: A Compassionate Approach To Parenting Your Anxious Child
- First edition
- Author: Malie Coyne
- Language: English
- Genre: Pediatrics, parenting
- Published: 23 July 2020
- Publisher: HarperCollins, Thorsons
- Publication place: Ireland
- Media type: Print (paperback)
- Pages: 294
- ISBN: 9780008332990

Love In, Love Out: A Compassionate Approach To Parenting Your Anxious Child is a 2020 non-fiction book by Malie Coyne. It was first published on 23 July 2020 through HarperCollins.

== Synopsis ==
Love In, Love Out is a book by Malie Coyne, an Irish child psychologist, that serves as a parenting guide to comprehending and recognizing the varying types of anxiety that children undergo during their course of development. It also details how children could develop adaptive coping strategies to manage their anxiety. The book draws from key psychological concepts, prominent case studies, and Coyne's own experiences.

== Reception ==
Sheila Wayman in her review of Love in, Love Out for The Irish Times, said the book's author, Coyne, "advocates a compassionate approach, which applies both to parent and child." Wayman also stated the following in her piece: "The title of the book comes from the affirmation a fellow mother likes to use in the midst of tough times with her children. It’s about taking a moment to draw breath, acknowledge that parenting is hard and reassure yourself you’re good enough, and then exhale that love out to your children."

In a book review released by Cambridge University Press, on behalf of the Irish Journal of Psychological Medicine, its corresponding writer Petra McLoughlin dubbed the book's author as "well placed to provide what she terms a compassionate approach to parenting your anxious child." Adding that, "the appendices provide the most extensive variety of tools for use across all age groups I have found within the genre to date."
