= Gargiulo's Italian Restaurant =

Italian-American Restaurant in Brooklyn, New York

Coordinates: 40°34′35.45″N 73°58′56.55″W

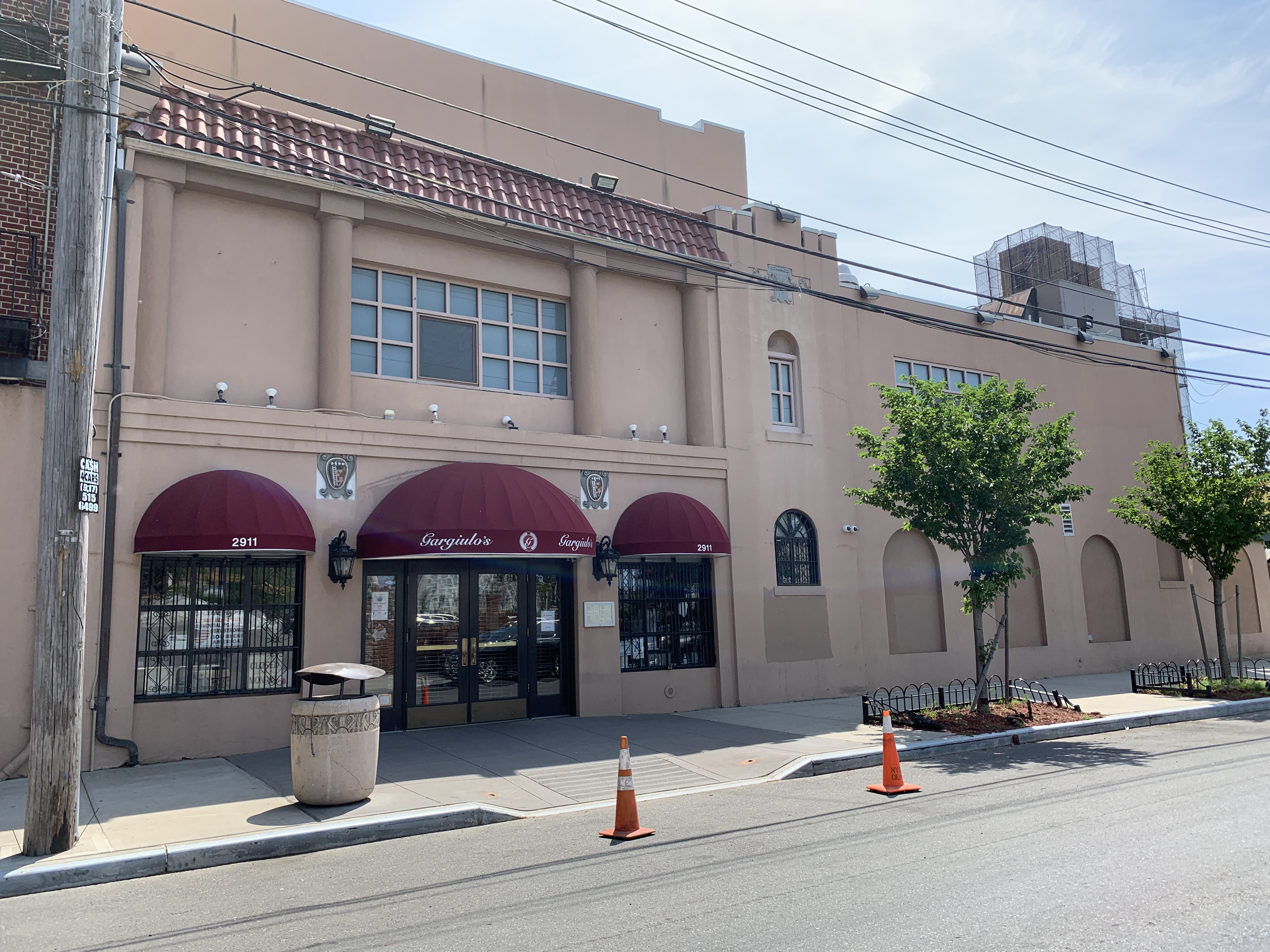
- Interactive map of Gargiulo's Italian Restaurant

Restaurant information
- Established: 1907; 119 years ago
- Owners: Louis, Rachael, Michael, Nino & Anthony Russo
- Food type: Italian-American
- Dress code: Business/Country Club Casual
- Location: 2911 West 15th Street, Coney Island, Brooklyn, New York, 11224, USA
- Reservations: recommended
- Other locations: Tinton Falls, NJ
- Website: www.gargiulos.com

Gargiulo's is an Italian-American restaurant established in 1907 in Coney Island, Brooklyn, New York City.

The restaurant was started and run by Gus Gargiulo, and later he was joined by his brother Louis and sisters Tessie and Angelina, with other family members working in the kitchen. Large parties were often held in the spacious dining room with its large maroon drapes and the parties often spilled out into the small courtyard in the back on warm days. Pictures of these parties lined the walls in the entrance hall, many with recognizable faces such as Jimmy Durante.

In April 1965, the Russo brothers (Michael, Victor and Nino) bought the restaurant from the Gargiulo family. Louis, Rachael, Mike, Nino & Anthony Russo are the current owners. In June 2007, they celebrated the restaurant's 100th anniversary, and in November 2015, they celebrated 50 years of Russo family ownership. In 2014, waiters started using iPads to take orders, discontinuing their former practice of using pen and paper. In late 2019, the restaurant opened an additional location in Tinton Falls, New Jersey. In June 2021, the family also opened a new Coney Island venue, La Tombola, in the historic Childs Restaurant Building on the Boardwalk.

== See also ==
- List of Italian restaurants
