= Ford Amphitheater at Coney Island =

Entertainment venue in Brooklyn, New York

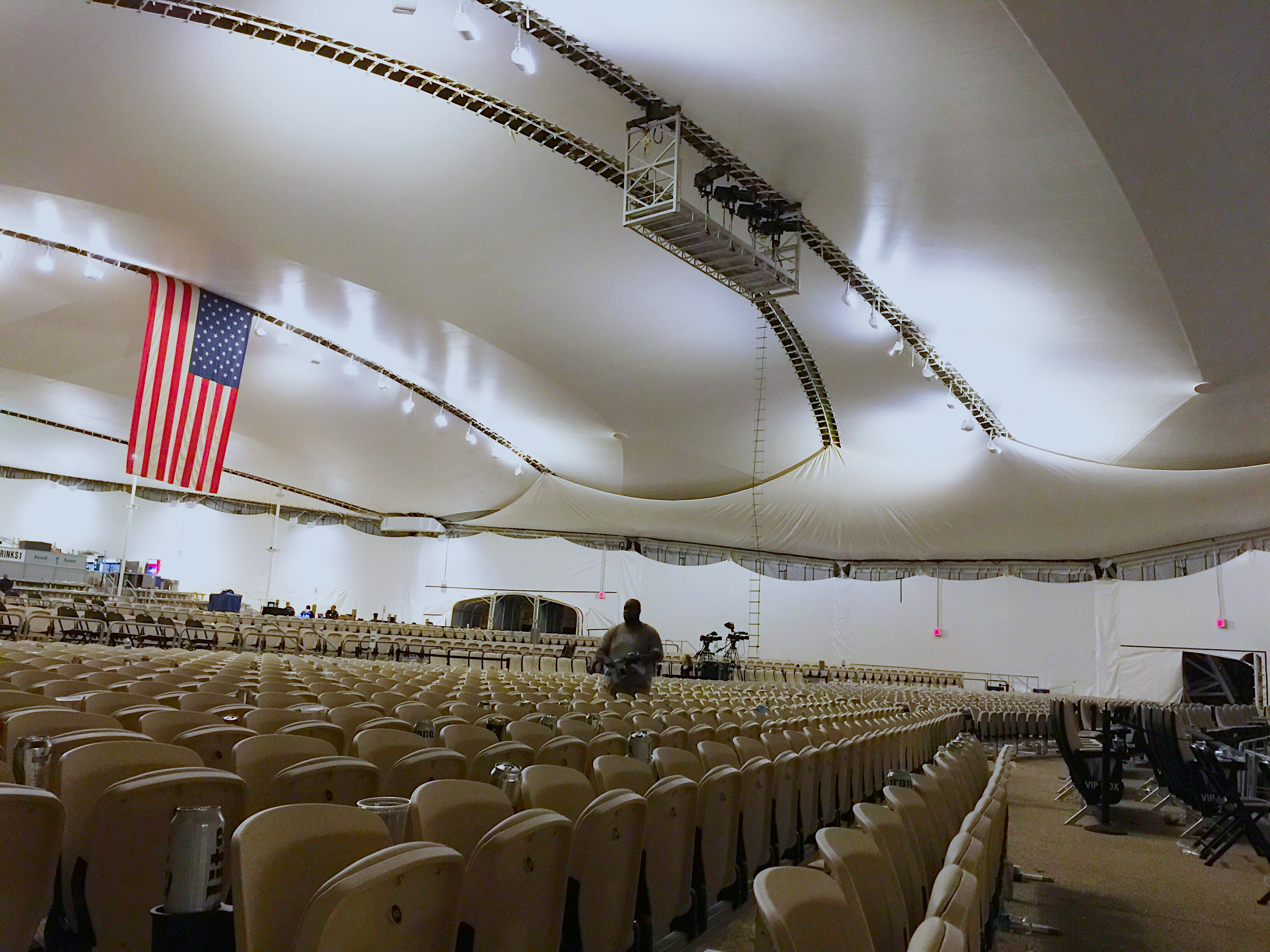
- The amphitheater in July 2016
- Interactive map of Ford Amphitheater at Coney Island
- Full name: Ford Amphitheater at Coney Island Boardwalk
- Address: 3052 West 21st St; Brooklyn, NY 11224
- Coordinates: 40.572879°N 73.987922°W
- Capacity: 5,000

Construction
- Opened: June 25, 2016

Website
- Venue website

The Ford Amphitheater at Coney Island is an outdoor live entertainment venue within the Childs Restaurants building on the Riegelmann Boardwalk in the Coney Island neighborhood of Brooklyn in New York City. The venue opened in June 2016.

== History ==
Plans for the Ford Amphitheater at Coney Island began in 2012. Construction began in 2015. It was constructed at the location of the Childs Restaurant on the Coney Island Boardwalk. The restaurant was originally constructed in 1923. It was renovated when the amphitheater was being constructed. The rooftop part of the restaurant opened back up in July 2016, followed by the main restaurant in 2017.

The impetus for the adaptive reuse of the Childs building largely came from Marty Markowitz, who was Borough President of Brooklyn from 2002 through 2013. Markowitz had long sought a permanent venue for the series of summer concerts that he had sponsored for 35 years, since his time in the New York State Senate. The plan was approved by the City Council just days before Markowitz left office on the last day of 2013.

The redevelopment plan faced some community opposition. Community gardeners who had been cultivating land adjacent to the building for 16 years sued the city in 2014. They asserted that the land had been previously designated a city park, so that the city's taking of the land for other purposes was illegal. In its response, the city stated that the park was decommissioned in 2004. Other critics of the plan were concerned about increased noise and traffic, and pointed out that the area had yet to fully recover from Hurricane Sandy in 2012. Coney Island's community board responded to these complaints by pressing for a "community benefits contract" that would guarantee good jobs for area residents. It also rejected the redevelopment plan, though the board did not have the power to stop the project, and it ultimately proceeded.

The first show at the newly opened venue was the Impractical Jokers on July 1, 2016. This was followed by performances by Peter Gabriel and Sting on July 3 and the Beach Boys (with special guest John Stamos) on July 4. Other acts that performed at the amphitheater during its inaugural season included the Hollywood Vampires, Culture Club, Travis Scott, 311, Counting Crows, Widespread Panic and Willie Nelson.
