= Ashley Stewart =

American plus size women's clothing company

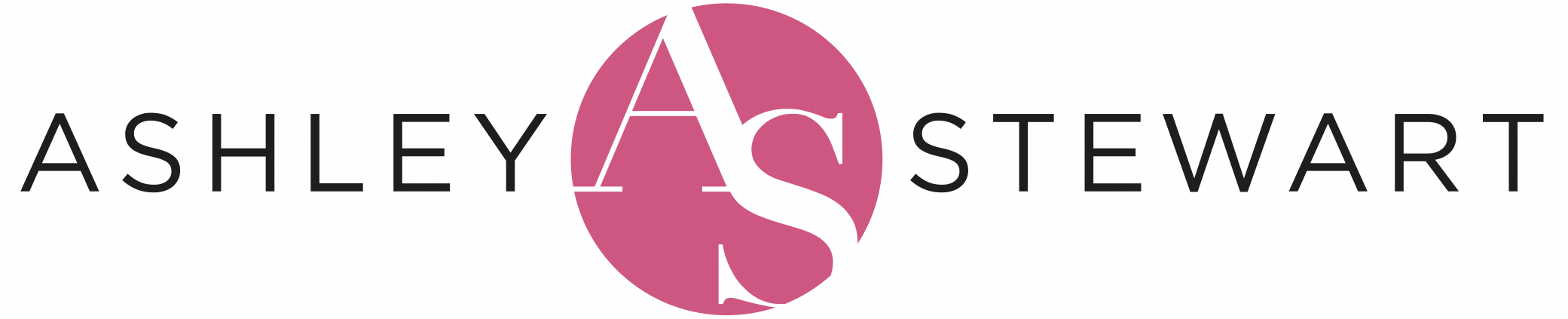

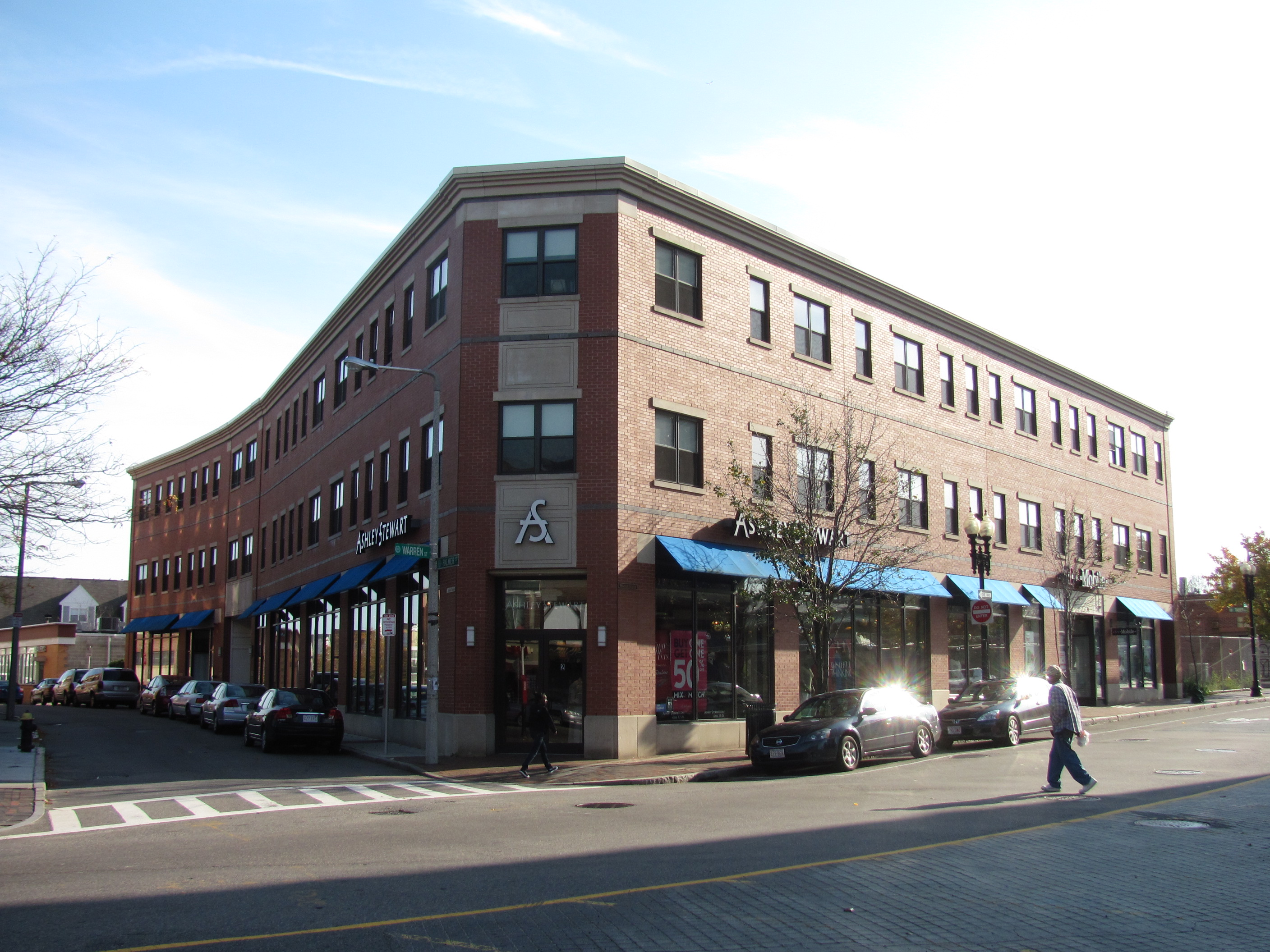
- Ashley Stewart store in Roxbury, Massachusetts
- Type: Privately held company
- Industry: Retail
- Founded: 1991; 35 years ago in New York City
- Headquarters: Secaucus, New Jersey, United States
- Number of locations: 89
- Area served: United States
- Key people: Gary Sheinbaum (Chairman & CEO)
- Products: Clothing
- Website: www.ashleystewart.com

Ashley Stewart is an American plus size women's clothing company and lifestyle brand, which was founded in 1991. The name Ashley Stewart was inspired by Laura Ashley and Martha Stewart, considered by the company's founders to be icons of upscale Americana.

The company based in Secaucus, New Jersey has 89 stores across 22 states as well as selling online. They sell a variety of apparel, ranging from jeans to dresses and shoes. Around 2017, the brand made a comeback, after filing for bankruptcy in 2010 and 2014.

== History ==
Ashley Stewart was founded in 1991, and quickly grew to over 380 stores in more than 100 cities, recording annual sales as high as US $400 million.

The company focused on holding events like fashion shows instead of launching large advertising campaigns. They would often hold 300 to 350 fashion shows a year, which raised money for the communities they were in. Each Ashley Stewart store also hired from within the community, and the company was recognized by President Bill Clinton for its contribution to the Welfare-to-work program.

=== Reinvention in the 2000s ===
In 2000, Sitt sold the company, after which it was owned by multiple private equity firms - a group led by Trimaran Fund II bought the company in 2004. In 2010, Urban Brands, the parent company of Ashley Stewart, filed for Chapter 11 bankruptcy protection, and Ashley Stewart was later purchased by GB Merchant Partners.

In March 2014, Ashley Stewart filed for Chapter 11 bankruptcy protection for the second time in four years as part of a potential sale of its assets. The company announced the closure of 27 underperforming locations. Ashley Stewart was later acquired by affiliates of Clearlake Capital and the FirePine Group.

James Rhee, CEO at the time stated that he sought to manage the company 'like a hedge fund', with the level of mathematical analysis and operational discipline of a blue chip investment firm, while at the same time developing a kind, open, and egalitarian corporate culture.

The company moved into e-commerce including shipping to Canada, the Caribbean, and the UK, with this accounting for approximately 40% of revenue by 2016.

They opened their first new store since the bankruptcy in Newark, New Jersey, in April 2017.

In December 2025, Ashley Stewart filed for Chapter 11 bankruptcy for the third time in an effort to freeze a “multi-state fraudulent transfer” to G Ashley Inc., claiming that the sale of its assets to the company was fraudulent due to the transaction being "unlawful."
