= James Rhee =

American business executive

James C. Rhee (born February 20th, 1971) is an American impact investor, business executive, author, and educator. He is most notable for his rescue of Ashley Stewart, a fashion retailer, from bankruptcy.

== Early life and education ==
Rhee was born in the US to Korean parents. His father was a pediatrician and his mother a nurse. He has an older brother born in Korea and a younger sister born in the US. He attended Minnesauke Elementary School in East Setauket, New York. There he had the formative experience related to kindness that inspired the title of his book red helicopter. He graduated from Harvard in 1993 and was a teacher at Wilbraham & Monson Academy from Aug 1993 to Jun 1995. He graduated from Harvard Law School in 1998, after taking mixture of classes from the Law School, the School of Business, and MIT Sloan.

== Career ==
After graduation, Rhee didn't practice law as he had initially planned but instead was with Merrill Lynch's Mergers & Acquisitions Group from 1998 to 2000. He joined J.W. Childs Associates, a Boston-based private equity firm, leaving in 2007, to join a start up that subsequently failed. In 2009 he founded FirePine Group, an impact investing firm providing family office services, so named because "some pine cones seed new trees only after ... a fire." One of the companies FirePine acquired was Ashley Stewart. In 2013, he agreed to become CEO in an attempt to turn it around. While there, he was recognized by the National Retail Federation's Foundation as a 2016 Power Player for his success. His strategy was to develop a core commitment kindness and math: Rhee has said that he sought to manage the company 'like a hedge fund', with the level of mathematical analysis and operational discipline of a blue chip investment firm, while at the same time developing a kind, open, and egalitarian corporate culture. Also he has stated that loyalty to and from its customers was an important factor.

He was awarded the Ernst & Young Entrepreneur Of The Year award in 2016 for his work at Ashley Stewart.

After seven years at Ashley Stewart (Aug 2013 to Jul 2020), he began a number of new roles:

He serves as the Johnson Chair of Entrepreneurship and a professor of entrepreneurship at Howard University. He is also the executive in residence and a strategic adviser at the MIT Leadership Center and holds an appointment as senior lecturer at the MIT Sloan School of Management. Rhee also serves as a member of the Advisory Council of JPMorgan Chase’s Advancing Black Pathways, the governing committee of the CEO Action for Racial Equity, and the board of directors of Conscious Capitalism, where he serves on the executive committee, and a founding member of Entrepreneurship-to-Entrepreurship at Ashoka.

Rhee was the 2022 recipient of the New York Urban League's Frederick Douglass Award and the 2023 Council of Korean Americans Trailblazer Award.
