= Ien Chi =

American filmmaker (born 1991)

Ien Chi (born June 1, 1991) is a Korean American filmmaker, speaker, and the former Creative Director of Jubilee Media. He is the director of the short film "Tick Tock", which won the Best Picture and Best Director awards at Campus MovieFest 2011, the world's largest student film festival. It is currently the most viewed and highest rated film of Campus MovieFest of all time. The film went viral and collectively has approximately 1.7 million views online and has been featured on Gizmodo and The Guardian, among other publications. Chi led the team at Jubilee Media to create several YouTube shows such Middle Ground that has collectively gotten over 750 million views online. He is also the former creative director of Mindset at DIVE Studios. In 2022, he gave a TEDx talk at UC Berkeley. Chi was one of the Executive Producers of Accepted. The film played at Tribeca Film Festival in 2021, then was acquired by Greenwich entertainment and set for release in theaters summer of 2022. The film was nominated for Outstanding Social Issue Documentary Emmy award in 2023, and was reviewed by the New York Times. Also in 2023, he co-produced a short documentary film entitled I'm Not an Activist following Dragon Combat Club, a New York based self-defense organization. The film addresses the rise of anti-Asian and Asian American hate, and screened at Georgetown University.
