= Lions Group NYC =

- Type: Private
- Industry: Real estate development, Commercial real estate development
- Founded: 1986; 40 years ago
- Founder: Albert Shirian, Ramin
- Headquarters: New York City
- Owner: Shirian Family

Lions Group NYC (Lions Group) is a family-owned and managed real estate development firm in New York City. Lions Group focuses on acquisition, development, construction, and management of residential, commercial, and retail properties.

== History ==
Founded in 1986 by Albert and Ramin Shirian, and based in Long Island, the company primarily was a homebuilder in Long Island. In the late 90s, Lions started its first big project, a 30-unit residential building in Kew Gardens, Queens. In 2004, it completed a 7-story building in Mulberry Street in lower Manhattan.

In 2016, Lions started building One Queens Plaza in Long Island City, a 18-story, 110-unit residential building.

As of October 2019, the company owns and operates over 1.5 million square feet of luxury condominium, commercial and family spaces. The company is run by Albert, Ramin, Aaron, Jake, Eric and Allen Shirian.

== Notable projects ==
Canvas, condo development in Long Island City, Queens.
