= Coney Island USA =

Nonprofit arts organization

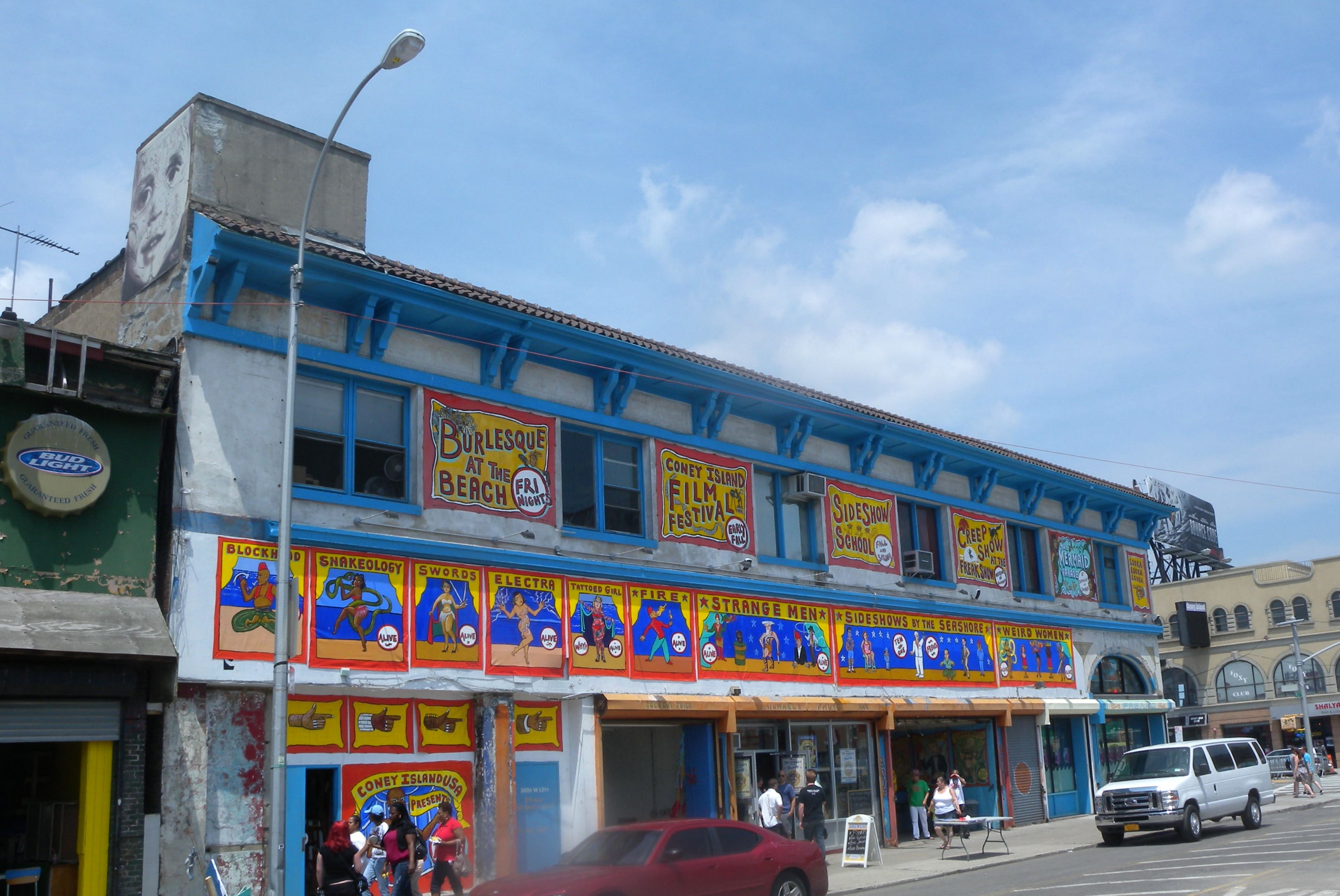
- Landmark building, once a Childs Restaurants branch
- Established: 1980; Brooklyn, New York, U.S.
- Coordinates: 40.5753°N 73.9798°W
- Type: Art, cultural
- Founders: Costa Mantis, Jane Savitt-Tennen, Dick D. Zigun
- Executive director: Patrick Wall
- Directors: Adam Rinn, (artistic)
- Website: Official website

Coney Island USA is a 501(c)(3) not-for-profit arts organization founded in 1980 that is dedicated to the cultural and economic revitalization of the Coney Island neighborhood of Brooklyn in New York City.

Coney Island USA's headquarters building in the heart of Coney Island's amusement district houses a theater in which the organization presents "Sideshows by the Seashore", a showcase for performers with unusual talents that runs continuously during the warmer months, as well as the Coney Island Museum.

The Coney Island Museum features artifacts and memorabilia about the amusement park, beach and neighborhood's history and culture, as well as changing exhibits of art and culture. The museum is open seasonally.

== History ==
Coney Island USA was founded in 1980 by Costa Mantis, Jane Savitt-Tennen and Dick D. Zigun. Over the years, Coney Island USA has been funded, in part, by the New York City Department of Cultural Affairs, the New York Council for the Humanities, the Brooklyn Borough President, and New York City Council member Mark Treyger and others.

In 2025, Coney Island USA joined the Coney Island History Project and other Coney Island community organizations in opposing the casino proposed by Thor Equities for Coney Island. Coney Island USA Executive Director Patrick Wall said of the casino: "We're asking for a giant fort to come and plop down on top of our entire amusement district across three blocks. That's crazy! It's going to keep people locked in, they've got food, they've got accommodations, they've got entertainment. They're never going to come outside, they're never going to give us money." In September 2025, a community advisory committee rejected the casino proposal, effectively ending the plan.

== Film festival ==
The Coney Island Film Festival is an annual independent film festival held in Coney Island. It was founded in 2001 and is presented by Coney Island USA.

== Parade ==
Coney Island USA is notable as the organizer of the annual Coney Island Mermaid Parade, the first of which took place in 1983.
