= Campus MovieFest =

Student film festival held in Georgia, US

- Company type: Film Festival produced by Ideas United, LLC
- Industry: Film Festival, Motion Pictures
- Founded: Atlanta, Georgia, US (2000)
- Headquarters: Atlanta, Georgia, US
- Key people: David Roemer, CEO; Dan Costa, President; Vijay Makar, Vice President of Marketing
- Website: campusmoviefest.com

Campus MovieFest (CMF) is the world's largest student film festival. Created in 2000 by four Emory University students, and originally called iMovieFest, Campus MovieFest utilizes Apple Computer laptops, iMovie, Final Cut Pro and Adobe Creative Cloud to give college and university students with all levels of filmmaking experience the opportunity to create short films. The equipment is provided to students for free for one week to create a 5-minute film.

== History ==
Originally named iMovieFest, the competition changed its name to Campus MovieFest in 2003 with the expansion of the program to Georgia Tech and now includes all the major Atlanta-area schools.

Campus MovieFest became a worldwide film festival with the addition of Scotland in 2003 at The University of St. Andrews. CMF expanded to Boston and Florida in spring 2005. San Francisco area was added in the fall of 2005 with a UC Berkeley partnership.

== Notable Participants ==
UbseyMovies (of EarthBound Saga internet fame) won Best Comedy for their short film Bobby's House at the 2008 CMF National Grand Finale in New York City. In October 2010, their film Elliot Kane won Best Picture at San Jose State University.

Rod Stewart's Ambition (the film company created by Dan Rickmers) was featured in the 2010 International Grand Finale in Tribeca for their film Deuce. In April 2011, Rod Stewart's Ambition's Nick Caruso won the first ever prize for Best Actor at New York University for their short film When Sally Met Harry. and their film Yellow Fever was featured in the International Grand Finale for that same year.

In 2011, Emory University filmmaker Ien Chi won the awards for Best Picture and Best Director awards for his short film Tick Tock at the International Grand Finale. The film is currently the most viewed and highest rated film of Campus MovieFest of all time. The film went viral and collectively has approximately 1.7 million views online and has been featured in various media sources.

== Participating Schools ==
The following schools have participated in Campus MovieFest:

=== United States ===
==== Alabama ====
- University of Alabama (2007–Present)

==== Arizona ====
- Arizona State University (2009–Present)
- University of Arizona (2009–Present)

==== California ====
===== Bay Area =====
- University of California - Berkeley (2005–2013, 2016)
- San Jose State University (2006–Present)
- Sonoma State University (2006–Present)
- San Francisco State University (2009–Present)
- California State University, Monterey Bay (2010–2011)
- University of California, Davis (2007–2008)
- California State University, East Bay (2007–2012)
- Stanford University (2006–2008)
- University of the Pacific (2007)
- Santa Clara University (2006)

===== SoCal =====
- University of California, Los Angeles (2007–2013)
- University of Southern California (2007–2010)
- Whittier College (2007–2013)
- Cal Poly Pomona (2007–2012)
- California State University, Northridge (2008–2009)
- California State University, Long Beach (2009–2012)
- San Diego State University (2009–Present)

==== Colorado ====
- Colorado State University (2011–2012)

==== Connecticut ====
- Eastern Connecticut State University (2010–2011)
- University of Connecticut (2015–Present)

==== Florida ====
- University of Tampa (2005–Present)
- Rollins College (2006–2012)
- University of Central Florida (2007–Present)
- Jacksonville University (2007–2012)
- University of South Florida (2008–Present)
- Stetson University (2008–Present)
- University of North Florida (2012–Present)
- University of Florida (2015–Present)

==== Georgia ====
- Emory University (2000–Present)
- Georgia Tech (2003–Present)
- Clark Atlanta University (2004–2011)
- Morehouse College (2004–2011)
- Spelman College (2004–2011)
- Georgia State University (2004–Present)
- University of Georgia (2004–2013)
- Art Institute of Atlanta (2008–Present)
- Oxford College (2003–2004)
- Georgia Gwinnett College (2012–Present)
- Georgia Perimeter College (2012–Present)
- Oglethorpe University (2013–Present)
- Georgia Southern University (2015–Present)

==== Illinois ====
===== Chicago =====
- Loyola University Chicago (2009–2014)
- DePaul University (2009–2010)
- Northwestern University (2010–2013)

==== Indiana ====
- Indiana University (2009–Present)

==== Maryland ====
- University of Maryland, College Park (2011–2012)
- University of Maryland, Baltimore County (2013–Present)

==== Massachusetts ====
- Bridgewater State University (2007–Present)
- Colleges of the Fenway (2015–Present)
- Curry College (2010)
- Fitchburg State University (2011–2015)
- MIT (2005–2008)
- Northeastern University (2005)
- Salem State University (2010–Present)
- Tufts University (2005–2008)
- Wesleyan University (2014–Present)

===== Boston =====
- Boston College (2005–2008)
- Boston University (2007–2008)
- Emerson College (2005–2011)
- Northeastern University (2005–present)
- Suffolk University (2009–2011)

==== New Jersey ====
- Fairleigh Dickinson University (2008–Present)
- The College of New Jersey (2013–Present)
- Rowan University (2010–2014)
- Rutgers University (2010–Present)

==== New York ====
- Columbia University in the City of New York (2008–2009)
- Fordham University (2009–Present)
- Hunter College (2009–2014)
- New York University (2008–2012)
- St. John's University (2013–Present)

==== North Carolina ====
- East Carolina University (2013–Present)
- North Carolina State University (2008–Present)
- University of North Carolina at Greensboro (2011–Present)

==== Ohio ====
- Ohio State University (2009–Present)
- Wittenberg University (2009)

==== Oregon ====
- Oregon State University (2009–2012)

==== Pennsylvania ====
- La Salle University (2010–Present)
- Pennsylvania State University (2009)

==== South Carolina ====
- University of South Carolina (2011–Present)

==== Virginia ====
- Longwood University (2011–Present)
- Virginia Institute of Technology (2012, 2014–Present)

==== Washington, D.C. ====
- Catholic University of America (2009–2013)

==== West Virginia ====
- West Virginia University (2014–present)

=== United Kingdom ===
==== England ====
- King's College London (2011)
- London School of Economics (2011)
- University College London (2011)
- University of Oxford (2011)
- University of Sussex (2011)
- University of Arts London (2011)

==== Scotland ====
- University of St. Andrews (2003)

== Partners ==
CMF has partnered with many companies over the years including Delta Air Lines (from 2004 - 2008),[17] and Coca-Cola (from 2006 - 2008). Supporting partners have also included Atlanta radio station 99x, and The History Channel.

In the Fall of 2005, Virgin Mobile partnered with CMF for the University of California - Berkeley event and to encourage students to create 30-sec videos for their Chrismahanukwanzakah holiday.

In the Spring of 2006, The History Channel joined with CMF to bring the "History Lives!" category to CMF participants.

From 2006 to 2009, Turner Classic Movies (TCM) partnered up with CMF and continues to present the TCM Classic Short Film Award in which students are asked to re-imagine a classic.

From 2007 to 2010, Turner Broadcasting Systems (TBS) joined CMF and are currently presenting the TBS Very Funny Film Award.

From 2007 to 2012, AT&T became a Supporting Partner of Campus MovieFest.

In the Fall of 2007, the Elfenworks Foundation became a Supporting Partner of Campus MovieFest, and has since presented the Elfenworks Social Justice Category. At that time, Virgin America also began showcasing Campus MovieFest winning films on its RED in-flight entertainment system. And Panasonic became a Supporting Partner of Campus MovieFest, enabling students to use the latest Panasonic cameras for their moviemaking.

In the Fall of 2011, Adobe became a Supporting Partner of Campus MovieFest and has remained since.

In the Fall of 2013, Doritos became a Supporting Partner of Campus MovieFest and promoted its Crash the Super Bowl competition to students nationwide. Two CMF participants have gone on to become finalists in the competition.

In the Fall of 2014, Western Digital became a Supporting Partner of Campus MovieFest, and presented the WD Fan Choice Award and $10,000 to the winning student. In addition, Google joined Campus MovieFest to promote Infinite Deviation, an opportunity to showcase diversity in Computer Science and STEM.

In the Fall of 2015, Sennheiser became a Prize Partner of Campus MovieFest.
