= John J. Bergen =

- Born: John Joseph Bergen; August 7, 1895; Pottsville, Pennsylvania
- Died: December 11, 1980 (aged 85); Cuernavaca
- Known for: Planning construction of current Madison Square Garden
- Military career
- Branch: United States Naval Reserve
- Rank: Rear admiral
- Awards: World War I Victory Medal; American Campaign Medal; Asiatic–Pacific Campaign Medal; World War II Victory Medal; Naval Reserve Medal

John Joseph Bergen (August 7, 1895 – December 11, 1980) was an American businessman who served as chairman of the Madison Square Garden Corporation.

== Early life ==
Bergen was born to Thomas D. and Ellen Bergen on August 7, 1895, in Pottsville, Pennsylvania, where his father owned a coal mine. He began his business career at the age of 16, when he hired some friends to sell furniture polish created by a chemist friend. Through his father he got to know General Motors president William C. Durant, who had a policy on personally calling all GM car owners. Durant hired Bergen as an office boy.

== Military service ==
On June 3, 1918, Bergen enlisted in the Naval Reserve Force as a Chief Machinist's Mate. After training on the USS Granite State, he was sent to France, where he piloted seaplanes in Brest, France. He returned to the United States on November 15, 1918, and was placed on inactive status on December 3, 1918. He received an honorable discharge on September 30, 1921.

Bergen remained involved in aviation after the war, financing Wooster and Davis's unsuccessful transatlantic flight and sponsoring the construction of Newark Airport.

Bergen returned to the Naval Reserve as a Lieutenant on July 16, 1926. He was promoted to Lieutenant Commander on June 8, 1938. On May 18, 1942, was called to active duty. He was soon promoted to Commander and assigned to the Secretary of the Navy's office. After completing a course at the Naval War College, he reported to Commander Fleet Air, South Pacific. From December 1943 to March 1944 he served at the Naval Station Puget Sound. In April 1944 he was made Chief of Staff and Public Relations Officer to the Commandant of the Base. He was detached for terminal leave on August 27, 1944, and released on inactive status three months later.

Bergen returned to the reserve after the war, retiring with the rank of Rear Admiral. He was awarded the World War I Victory Medal, American Campaign Medal, Asiatic–Pacific Campaign Medal, World War II Victory Medal, and Naval Reserve Medal.

== Business career ==
In 1922, Bergen became president of the Flint Motor Company. He then served as a district manager of Durant Motors. Bergen was also a business associate of Eddie Dowling and helped finance Shadow and Substance and The White Steed.

In 1927, Bergen started his own wholesale underwriting firm, the John J. Bergen & Company. John J. Bergen & Company underwrote stock for Grumman, Willys-Overland, United Aircraft, Bank of America, and General Instrument. In 1941, John J. Bergen & Company purchased 57% of Gar Wood Industries.

Bergen served as chairman of Gar Wood Industries, Louis Sherry Inc., Childs Company, Graham-Paige, New Haven Clock and Watch, Hotel Corporation of America, and Royal American Corporation. From 1952 to 1955 he was president of Graham-Paige. In 1960, Bergen lost his bid for Washington D.C.'s American League expansion team to Elwood Richard Quesada.

In 1959, Graham-Paige purchased controlling interest in Madison Square Garden from James D. Norris and Arthur Wirtz. Bergen served as chairman of Madison Square Garden and president of the New York Rangers. Under his leadership, plans began for a new Madison Square Garden. In 1962, Graham-Paige changed its name to the Madison Square Garden Corporation. Bergen resigned from Madison Square Garden Corporation on April 6, 1962. He was succeeded as chairman by Irving Mitchell Felt and as Rangers president by William M. Jennings but stayed on as a director.

Bergen died on December 11, 1980, at his daughter's home in Cuernavaca. He was 85 years old.

Preceded by John Kilpatrick	Chairman of Madison Square Garden; 1959–62	Succeeded by Irving Mitchell Felt
Preceded by John Kilpatrick	President of the New York Rangers; 1960–62	Succeeded by William M. Jennings
