= Hotel New Netherland =

Demolished hotel in Manhattan, New York

Coordinates: 40°45′52″N 73°58′21″W

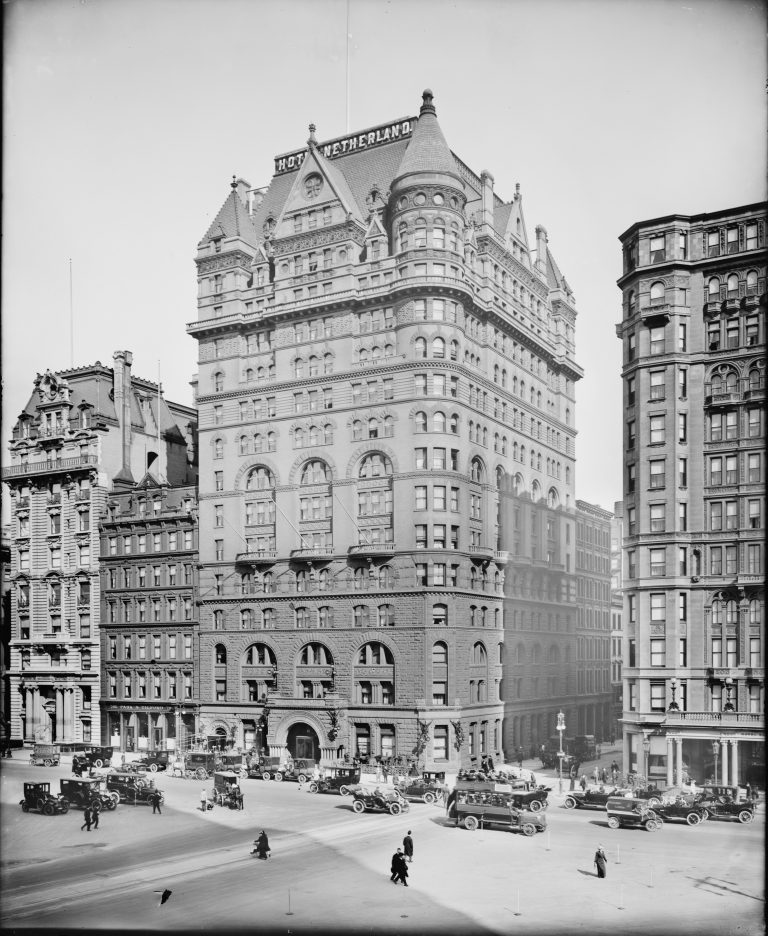
- Hotel Netherland (ca. 1912)
- Interactive map of the Hotel New Netherland area

General information
- Status: Demolished
- Location: Сorner of Fifth Avenue and 59th Street
- Opening: 1892–1893
- Demolished: 1927
- Owner: William Waldorf Astor

Height
- Height: 234 feet (71 m)

Technical details
- Floor count: 17

Design and construction
- Architect: William H. Hume

Hotel New Netherland (later Hotel Netherland) was a hotel located at the northeast corner of Fifth Avenue and 59th Street, in Manhattan, New York City, New York, in what is now the Upper East Side Historic District. It contained the Sherry's restaurant from 1919 until the building's demolition in 1927.

== History ==
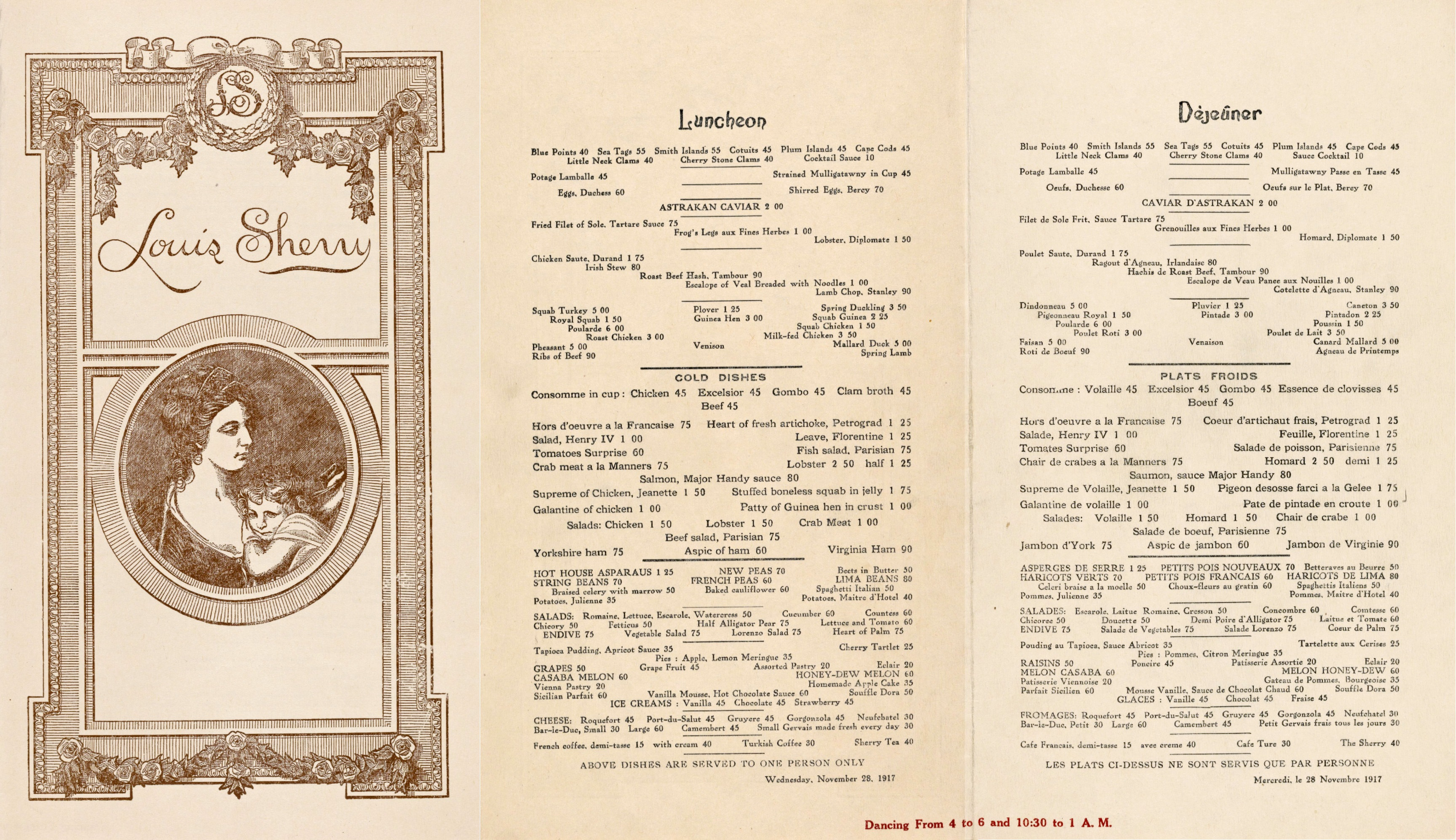
A 1917 menu for the Louis Sherry restaurant in the Hotel Netherland

Built in 1892-93 to a design by William H. Hume for William Waldorf Astor, its original lessee was Ferdinand P. Earle. The structure was 234 feet (71 m) in height with 17 stories, making it the "tallest hotel structure in the world". The building was among the first with a steel-frame in the city, and enjoyed a reputation for being a very fashionable hotel and location in its day. It was a luxury hotel, with some units used as residences; the rooms lacked kitchens. Meals were served in the hotel's dining room, the Louis Sherry restaurant. Renamed the Hotel Netherland in 1908, the neo-Romanesque structure was razed in 1927 and replaced by the Sherry Netherland Hotel.
