= Jørgine Boomer =

Norwegian-American businesswoman (1887–1971)

- Born: Jørgine Rolfsdatter Slettede; August 18, 1887; Lom, Norway
- Died: May 7, 1971 (aged 83); New York City
- Resting place: Storhaugen farm Bøverdalen, Norway
- Other names: Georgia S. Sloane; Georgia Boomer
- Education: Columbia University
- Occupation: Hotel manager
- Years active: 1915 - 1971
- Employer: The Waldorf-Astoria Hotel
- Known for: Owning / managing The Waldorf-Astoria Hotel
- Spouses: Richard Sloane (m. 1915–1916) Lucius M. Boomer (m. 1920–1947)
- Children: George Dupont Boomer (1921-1999), Bonita Boomer
- Parent(s): Rolf Olsen Visdalen (1851–1905); Marit Jonsdatter Slettede (1860–1941)

Jørgine Slettede Boomer (August 18, 1887 – May 7, 1971) was a Norwegian-American businesswoman and entrepreneur, noted for her rags-to-riches story as a poor immigrant who became the co-owner and manager of one of the world's largest luxury hotels, the Waldorf-Astoria Hotel in New York City.

== Biography ==
Jørgine was born into a poor family supported by the tenant farm of Utafor, under the farm of Galde nordre in the Bøverdalen valley in Lom Municipality in Kristians amt (county), Norway. In 1903, she and her older sister Mari emigrated to the United States. Their journey was long and arduous as they often were at the time: They first walked 20 km to the center of Fossbergom, then on the back of a horse-drawn cart to Otta, and from there the train to Kristiania. From there they traveled by boat to Bergen, boarded a liner to Hull, England, and from there by train to Liverpool. In Liverpool, they stayed in a boarding house with twenty other women. They left for the New World on the ocean liner RMS Cedric, and arrived, with 2,800 other passengers, in New York City ten days later on June 14, 1903.

Once landed in New York, they traveled by train to Minneapolis via Chicago, and finally arrived in Fergus Falls, Minnesota, where they were met by their uncle Ole. They were immediately put to work, possibly to repay the debt of their passage. Jørgine worked at her uncle's farm, but also as a nanny at a neighboring farm, while attending several evening courses. In 1905, Jørgine was admitted as a student nurse at the Minnesota Mental Institution in Minneapolis. She was subsequently admitted to the Columbia University College of Physicians and Surgeons in New York City. In 1915 she married Richard Sloane, who was on the faculty of Columbia as a surgeon. She also made her first return trip to Norway. She was widowed after six months. By this point, however, Georgia (as she was now known) had been introduced to society in New York. In 1917 she became a naturalized citizen of the United States.

== Lucius M. Boomer ==
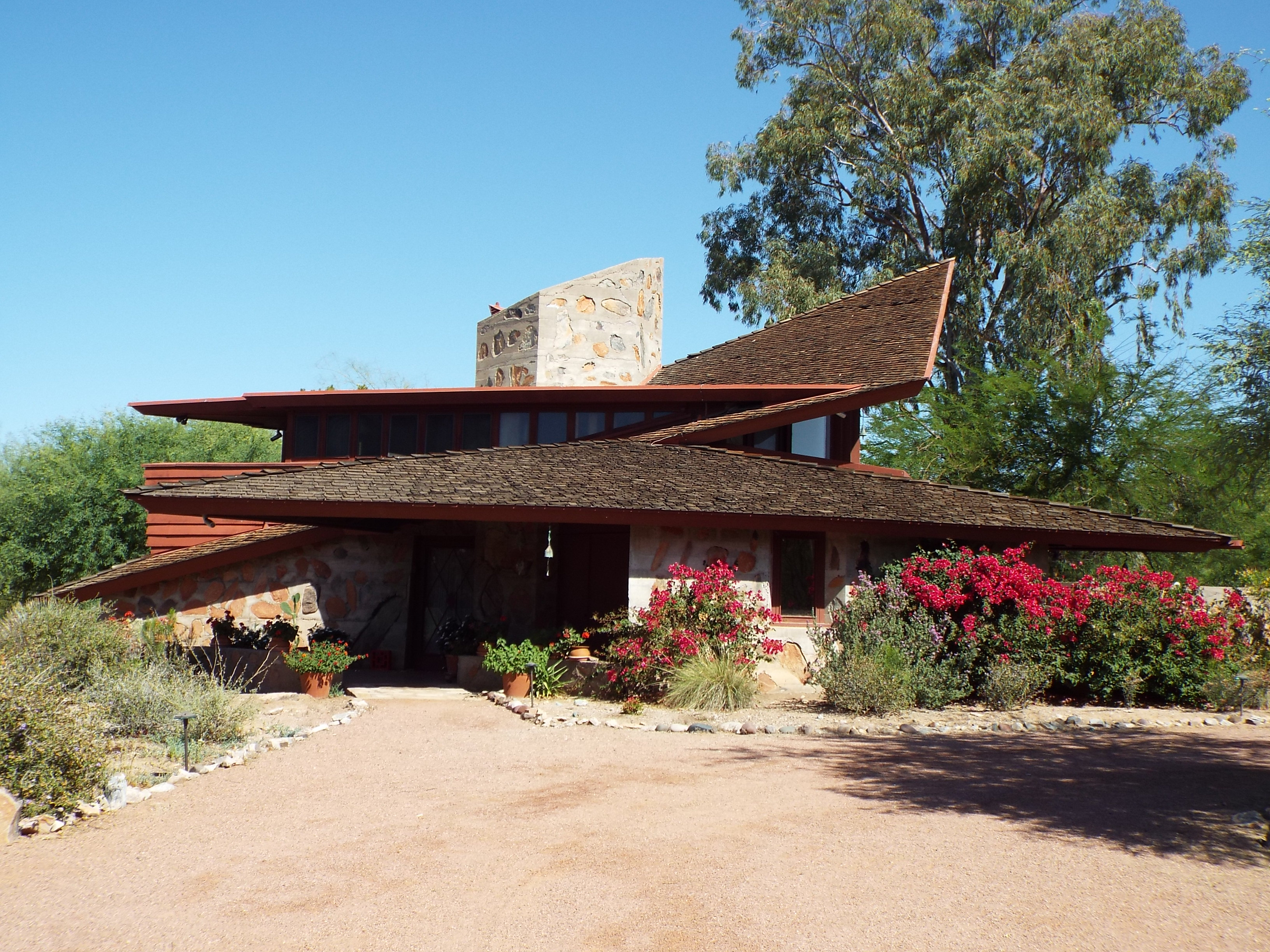
The Jorgine Boomer House The house, located at 5808 30th Street in Phoenix, Az., was designed by Frank Lloyd Wright. The house was listed in the National Register of Historic Places on March 15, 2016, reference #16000071.

In 1920, she married Lucius M. Boomer (1878–1947), president of Boomer-du Pont Properties Corporation. Lucius M. Boomer owned or managed a number of hotels with industrialist Thomas Coleman DuPont. In 1918, they purchased the Waldorf-Astoria Hotel, then in 1920 the Willard Hotel in Washington, D. C. and in 1925 the company purchased The Bellevue-Stratford Hotel in Philadelphia from the heirs of the founder, George C. Boldt. Later Boomer had charge of the Claridge restaurant of Times Square and the Windsor Hotel, in Montreal. Eventually he became directing head of Louis Sherry Inc., the president of the Sherry-Netherland Hotel and also president of the Savarin Restaurant chain.

Georgia and her husband managed The Waldorf-Astoria Hotel during its most celebrated era. The original Waldorf-Astoria was torn down in 1929 to make room for the Empire State Building. Lucius Boomer had retained exclusive rights to use the name Waldorf-Astoria. Boomer was in retirement in late 1929 when he was asked if he would head up a new Waldorf-Astoria. On October 1, 1931, the new Waldorf-Astoria was opened to the public. On June 26, 1947, Lucius Boomer died at 67 years of age while vacationing in Hamar, Norway. On October 12, 1949, the Waldorf became a Hilton Hotel. Although The Waldorf-Astoria Hotel passed to Conrad Hilton, Georgia continued to manage the hotel for several years afterwards.

Lucius and Georgia had befriended many of the celebrities of their time. Among them were presidents Herbert Hoover, Harry S Truman, and Dwight D. Eisenhower; performers such as Charlie Chaplin, Benny Goodman, Douglas Fairbanks, and Kirsten Flagstad; explorers Roald Amundsen and Fridtjof Nansen, Trygve Lie as well as members of the Norwegian royal family. She helped a young Frank Sinatra launch his career by allowing him to perform there, and is (in competition with several others) credited for popularizing the Waldorf Salad.

== Legacy ==
Georgia Boomer purchased several properties in Norway, and after her death the urn with her ashes were deposited at one of her farms. Her name is also remembered in connection with the house on North 30th Street in Phoenix, Arizona designed for her in 1953 by Frank Lloyd Wright, commonly referred to as the Jørgine Boomer Residence.

== Related reading ==
- Boomer, Lucius Messenger (1931) Hotel Management; Principles and Practice (Harper)
- Farrell, Frank (1982) The Greatest of Them All. History of The Waldorf-Astoria (K. S. Giniger Company)
- Turkel, Stanley (2007) Great American Hoteliers: Pioneers of the Hotel Industry (McFarland & Company)
