= Krumpe =

Krumpe is a surname. Notable people with the surname include:

- Jack Krumpe (1936–2020), American sports executive
- Paul Krumpe (born 1963), American soccer player and coach
