= The Sherry-Netherland =

Hotel in Manhattan, New York

Sherry-Netherland
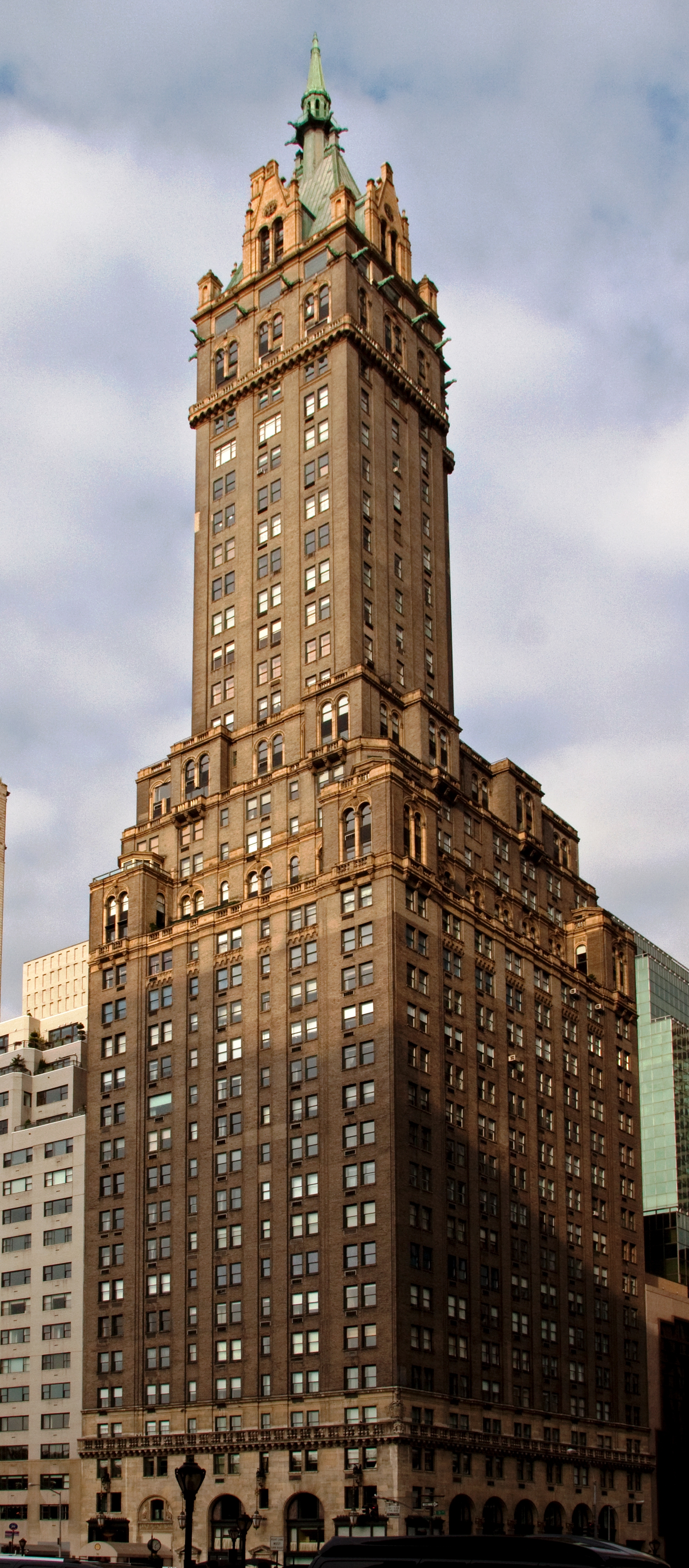
- (2010)

General information
- Type: Hotel
- Architectural style: Romanesque Revival; Gothic Revival
- Location: 781 Fifth Avenue; Manhattan, New York City
- Coordinates: 40°45′51″N 73°58′22″W
- Construction started: 1926
- Completed: 1927
- Owner: Atlas Corporation

Height
- Height: 560 ft (170.7 m)

Technical details
- Floor count: 38

Design and construction
- Architects: Schultze & Weaver; Buchman & Kahn

The Sherry-Netherland is a 38-story apartment hotel located at 781 Fifth Avenue on the corner of East 59th Street on the Upper East Side of Manhattan in New York City. It was designed by Schultze & Weaver with Buchman & Kahn. At 560 ft (170.7 m), it was the tallest apartment hotel in New York City when it opened. The building is located in the Upper East Side Historic District, which was created in 1981.

== Features ==
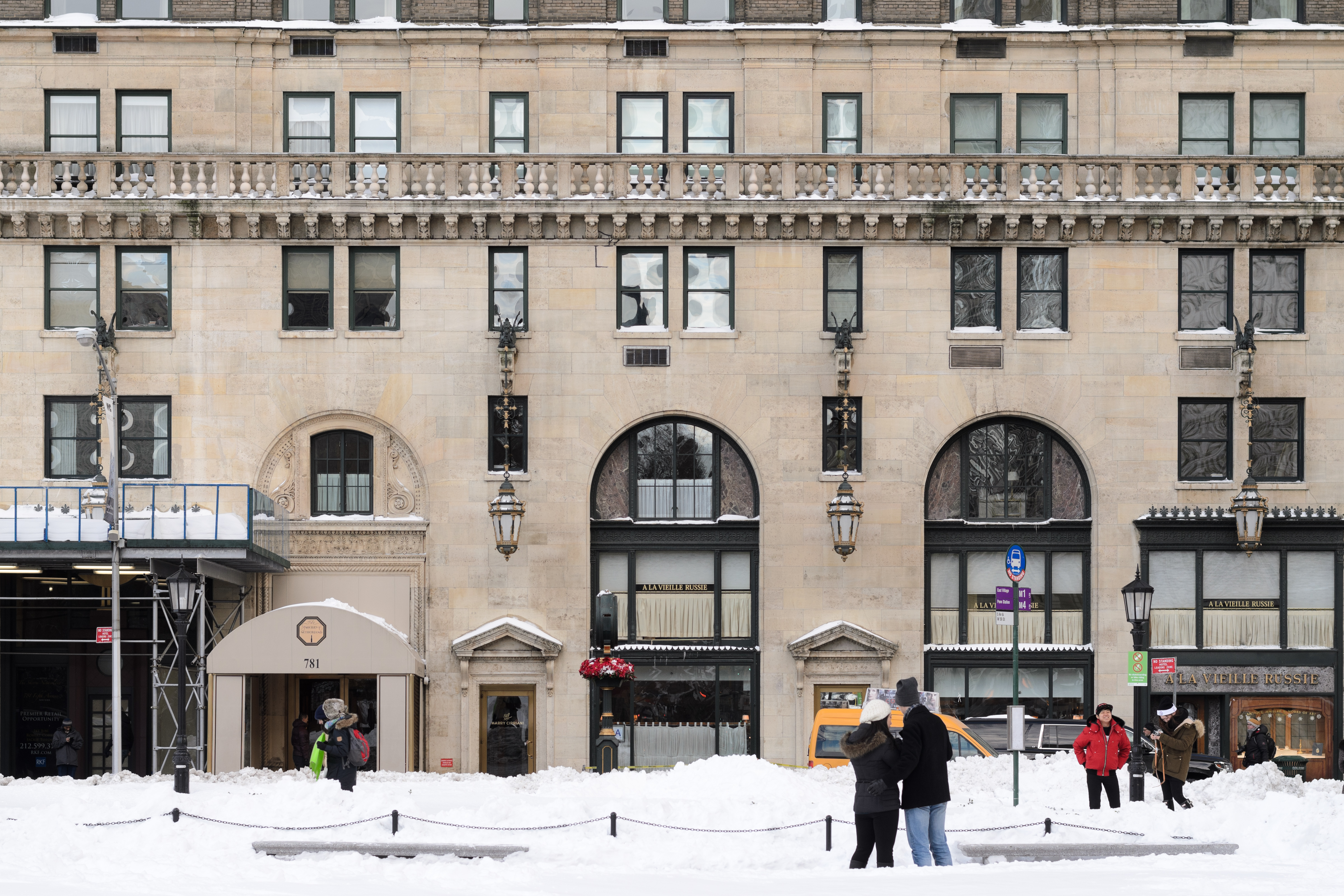
The hotel's lower facade (2016)

The building houses 165 apartments that were converted to co-ops in 1954. There are 50 hotel rooms and suites, and in the tower above the 24th floor there are single apartments to a floor. The Neo-Romanesque/Neo-Gothic roofline with gargoyles disguises the water tower.

== History ==
The site had been occupied since the early 1890s by the Hotel New Netherland, designed by William Hume for William Waldorf Astor, a member of the prominent Astor family. The building that was to replace it would occupy the same footprint and frontage on Fifth Avenue.

Demolition began in the early winter of 1926, and construction began before the year was out, but the upper floors suffered a spectacular fire when wooden scaffolding burned on April 12, 1927, before the building was completed. The fire burned for 12 hours and flames were said to have been visible from Long Island. It ignited a debate in the press concerning the ability of the available technology to put out fires in high-rise buildings.

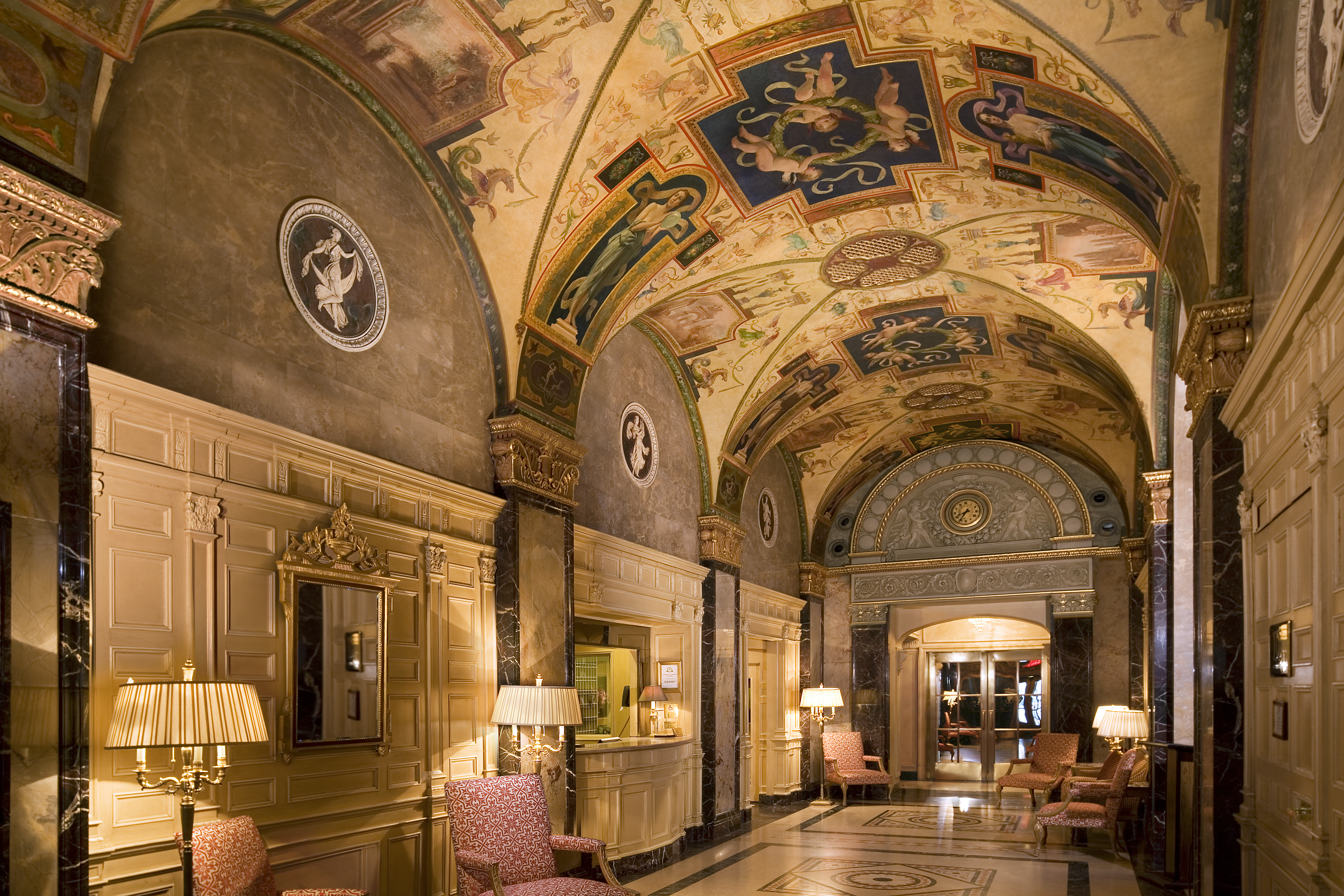
Restored lobby (2014)

At the time of the hotel's construction, the Vanderbilt mansion, diagonally across Fifth Avenue, was being demolished. High relief carved limestone panels by Karl Bitter from the Vanderbilt's porte-cochere and ornamental frieze roundels from that mansion were installed in the Sherry's classicizing groin-vaulted lobby, where massive marble-veneered pilasters with gilded Italian Renaissance capitals articulate walls paneled in small rectangles, Jacobean-fashion. Because of Prohibition, the Sherry was designed with smaller public restaurant square footage than other pre-war hotels.

In March 1927, construction was almost completed and the property was turned over to Louis Sherry, Inc., a subsidiary of Boomer-duPont Properties Corporation. Lucius Boomer was a noted hotel operator and was also affiliated with the Waldorf-Astoria Hotel, while Louis Sherry was a noted restaurateur, famous for ice creams and other confections, and had run a hotel and restaurant, Sherry's, at 44th Street and Fifth Avenue, closing it soon after Prohibition. Sherry had died before his name became associated with the new venture.

In 1940, the famous stock trader Jesse Livermore committed suicide in the cloakroom of the hotel.

In 1949, the hotel was sold to Floyd Odlum and Boyd Hatch's Atlas Corporation.

When the New York City Landmarks Commission created the Upper East Side Historic District on May 19, 1981, the Sherry-Netherland was included within its boundaries.

In 2014, the lobby ceiling was restored by Evergreene Architectural Arts. The frescoes on the ceiling were based on Raphael's frescoes in Cardinal Bibbienna's Loggetta at the Apostolic Palace in Vatican City. The style was recreated by artist Joseph Aruta in the 1920s.
