= William M. Jennings =

American lawyer

William Jennings
- Born: December 14, 1920; New York City, US
- Died: August 17, 1981 (aged 60); Byram, Connecticut, US
- Education: Princeton University; Yale Law School
- Occupation(s): Lawyer, sportsman
- Known for: New York Rangers; Westchester Classic
- Board member of: National Hockey League; New York Rangers; Suburbane Propane Gas Corp. Lee National Corp; Warnaco Inc.
- Spouse: Elizabeth Hite
- Children: 5
- Awards: Lester Patrick Trophy (1971)
- Honors: Hockey Hall of Fame (1975) United States Hockey Hall of Fame (1981)

William M. Jennings (December 14, 1920 – August 17, 1981) was an executive in the National Hockey League.

Born in New York, New York, Jennings graduated from Princeton University and then earned a law degree from Yale Law School. He became a partner in a Manhattan law firm and through his capacity as counsel to Madison Square Garden, in 1962 he was named president of their main tenant, the New York Rangers. He was president of the Rangers until his death in 1981. During this time, the Rangers became Stanley Cup contenders. He was a key figure in the first ever expansion of the NHL in 1967 when it doubled in size from the original six teams. Jennings also helped initiate the Lester Patrick Trophy in 1966, which he would win in 1971.

The William M. Jennings Trophy was named in his honor. In 1975, he was elected to the Hockey Hall of Fame and in 1981 to the United States Hockey Hall of Fame.

In 1966, Jennings founded the New York Metropolitan Hockey Association, one of only a few outlets in the area at that time available for young hockey players. In 1967, Jennings founded the Westchester Classic golf tournament in Harrison, New York as a means to raise funds for charitable purposes in Westchester County.

== See also ==
- List of members of the United States Hockey Hall of Fame

Preceded by John J. Bergen	President of the New York Rangers; 1962–81	Succeeded by Jack Krumpe
Preceded by Bruce Norris	Chairman of the NHL Board of Governors; 1968–1970	Succeeded by Bill Wirtz
