= Richard Evans (executive) =

American sports and entertainment executive

Richard H. Evans is an American sports and entertainment executive.

== Early life and career ==
Evans was born in Ogden, Utah. In 1966, he graduated from the University of Denver with a bachelor's degree in business administration.

Evans held various management positions in the amusement park industry. He helped plan and develop Disney World for Walt Disney Productions, developed Marriott Corporation's two Great America amusement parks (now known as California's Great America and Six Flags Great America), and planned an amusement park in Orlando, Florida for Ringling Bros. and Barnum & Bailey Circus that was never built.

== Radio City Music Hall ==
In 1980, Evans was named chief executive officer of Radio City Music Hall Productions. Evans identified five areas that could operate inside the building as well as work outside the Hall. These were the Christmas Spectacular Starring the Radio City Rockettes, concerts (Radio City eventually controlled 60% of the New York concert market), a theatrical touring company, special-events, and television production. Under Evans' management, Radio City turned a profit for the first time in 30 years.

== Madison Square Garden ==
Evans was named president and CEO of Madison Square Garden Corporation on November 3, 1986. In this role he was responsible for operations of Madison Square Garden, the MSG Network, the New York Rangers, and the New York Knicks. After taking over, Evans reorganized the corporation into four operating groups - MSG Sports, MSG Entertainment, MSG Communications, and MSG Facilities Development & Management. Former MSG legal counsel Jack Diller was brought in to run the sports group.

During his tenure at MSG, Evans oversaw the arena's $200 million renovation as well as the construction of the Paramount Theatre, which replaced the Felt Forum.

=== New York Knicks ===
Following the 1986-87 NBA season, Evans fired Knicks General Manager Scotty Stirling and head coach Bob Hill. Evans was criticized for going to a speaking engagement in Venice while coaching candidates Rick Pitino and Larry Brown faced deadlines to re-sign with their college teams. Evans stated that he planned to have a new general manager and coach in place by the 1987 NBA draft on June 22, however it wasn't until July 8 – 80 days after Stirling and Hill were fired and after five other teams had hired hire new coaches, that Evans hired Al Bianchi as general manager. Although Pitino had signed a new contract with Providence College two months earlier, he was able to obtain his release from the school and became the Knicks' head coach.

Bianchi acquired Charles Oakley, Sidney Green, Johnny Newman, and drafted Rod Strickland. Mark Jackson, who was drafted by scouting director Dick McGuire in the '87 draft, won Rookie of the Year. In 1988-89 the Knicks won their first division title in nearly twenty years. After the season, Rick Pitino chose to return to college basketball and was succeeded by assistant Stu Jackson.

On December 3, 1990, Stu Jackson was fired and replaced as Knicks head coach by John MacLeod. On March 1, 1991, Evans fired Knicks general manager Al Bianchi and replaced him with Dave Checketts. Evans also demoted MSG sports group head Jack Diller by removing his oversight of the Knicks and naming him president of the Rangers.

=== New York Rangers ===
After the 1986-87 NHL season, head coach Tom Webster resigned due to illness. Unlike the Knicks' coaching search, the Rangers, at general manager Phil Esposito's urging, quickly hired Michel Bergeron. Esposito acquired Brian Mullen, Chris Nilan, Bob Froese, and Kelly Kisio while Tony Granato, Brian Leetch, and Ulf Dahlen, who were drafted by Esposito's predecessor Craig Patrick, also joined the roster. In 1989–90, the Rangers won their first ever division title.

=== Resignation ===
On March 18, 1991, Stanley R. Jaffe became president of MSG's parent company, Paramount. According to Diller, Jaffe "decided he is going to shake things up". Many of Evans' top assistants, including Jack Diller, were fired and Paramount ignored his request for a long-term contract. On August 5, 1991, Evans resigned from Madison Square Garden.

== Gaylord Entertainment ==
After leaving Madison Square Garden, Evans became president and CEO of Dorna USA, a subsidiary of Dorna promoción del deporte. In February 1993 he was named executive vice president and chief operating officer of Gaylord Entertainment, which owned the Grand Ole Opry, Opreyland Hotel, Opryland USA, TNN, and CMT.

While at Gaylord, Evans led the effort to pass tax measures to build arenas and stadiums to lure professional sports teams to the city. He helped persuade Bud Adams to relocate the National Football League's Houston Oilers to Nashville. He also helped the city get to the top of the NHL's expansion list after attempts to have the Florida Panthers and New Jersey Devils relocate to the city failed.

== Huizenga Sports ==
In September 1996, Evans announced that he was resigning from Gaylord to become president and CEO of H. Wayne Huizenga's Huizenga Sports & Entertainment Group, which owned the Miami Dolphins, Florida Marlins, Florida Panthers, and Pro Player Stadium. Evans left Huizenga on April 15, 1998 "in order to pursue private business and investment interests".

== Real estate ==
Since April 1999, Evans has been the chairman of Evans Holdings, LLC, a real estate investment services company. On June 4, 2015, LifePoint Health named Evans its lead director of the company's board of directors.

| Preceded by Jack Krumpe | President of Madison Square Garden; 1986–91 | Succeeded by Bob Gutkowski |
