= Irving Mitchell Felt =

American businessperson

- Born: Isadore Maurice Felt; 25 January 1909; Manhattan, New York
- Died: 22 September 1994 (age 85); Los Angeles, California
- Other name: Irwin Felt
- Education: Wharton School
- Occupation: businessman
- Known for: Developer of Madison Square Garden
- Spouse(s): Elaine Edelman (divorced); Serene Bihari
- Children: with Edelman: --Constance H. Felt --Jonathan S. Felt with Bihari: --Randolph J. Leavenworth III (stepson)

Irving Mitchell Felt (25 January 1909 – 22 September 1994) was a New York businessman who led the drive in the 1960s to build a new Madison Square Garden.

== Biography ==
Felt was born Isadore Maurice Felt to Abraham and Dora (Mandel) Felt, into a Jewish family in Manhattan growing up around West 140th Street. His father was a lawyer. At the age of 19, he graduated from the Wharton School of the University of Pennsylvania with a degree in Finance and then took a job with the Wall Street concern, Hayden Stone. At the age of 28, he left the firm and helped to reorganize the investment firm Graham-Paige.

In 1959, with Felt as its president, Graham-Page purchased a controlling interest in the old Madison Square Garden (built 1925). Wanting to replace the old Garden with a new and modern facility that was more flexible, could handle larger crowds, and provided unobstructed views, in November 1960, he quietly purchased from the Pennsylvania Railroad the air rights to build a new Garden over Penn Station. In July 1961, Felt announced that he would demolish McKim, Mead, and White's Pennsylvania Station at West 33rd Street and 7th Avenue and build a new Madison Square Garden at the site. Prior to the hearing for the demolition, his brother, James Felt, the then-current chair of the New York City City Planning Commission, resigned. He formed a new company, Madison Square Garden, Inc. which was 75% owned by Graham-Paige and 25% owned by the Pennsylvania Railroad. From 1960 to 1968, Felt oversaw the project from demolition to completion. The project was fully privately financed. Despite the controversy generated over the demolition, Felt stated that he "believed that the gain from the new buildings and sports center would more than offset any aesthetic loss" and that "Fifty years from now, when its time for [the new Madison Square Garden] to be torn down, there will be a new group of architects who will protest." As of 2023 the building is still standing 55 years after it opened and is the oldest arena in the NHL and NBA.

Thereafter, he served as president of the Madison Square Garden Corporation when it purchased the New York Rangers hockey club, the New York Knicks basketball club, Roosevelt Raceway on Long Island, and the ice show production company, Holiday on Ice Productions. He is known for bringing the "Fight of the Century" between Muhammad Ali and Joe Frazier to Madison Square Garden on March 8, 1971.

The theater within the new Garden was named Felt Forum in his honor; it is now known as The Theater at Madison Square Garden.

== Philanthropy and political activities ==
He served as a president and chairman of the Federation of Jewish Philanthropies and as the head of the National Conference of Christians and Jews. He also served on the board of directors of the Metropolitan Opera Association for two decades, he was a founding patron of the Lincoln Center for the Performing Arts, and served as a national trustee of the Joffrey Ballet.

He was a major fund-raiser for the Senator Jacob Javits of New York and served as campaign chairman in 1990 for Republican congressional candidate Jim Salomon in his race against San Fernando Valley Representative Anthony Beilenson.

== Personal life ==
Felt was married twice. In 1945, he married Elaine Edelman who was also Jewish; they had two children, Constance Harriet Felt and Jonathan Seth Felt (1949–2018). They divorced and in 1973, he married Serene Leavenworth (née Bihari), sister to the Bihari brothers. He has a stepson with Bihari, Randolph Julian Leavenworth III.
