= Louis Sherry =

American restaurateur and confectioner (1855-1926)

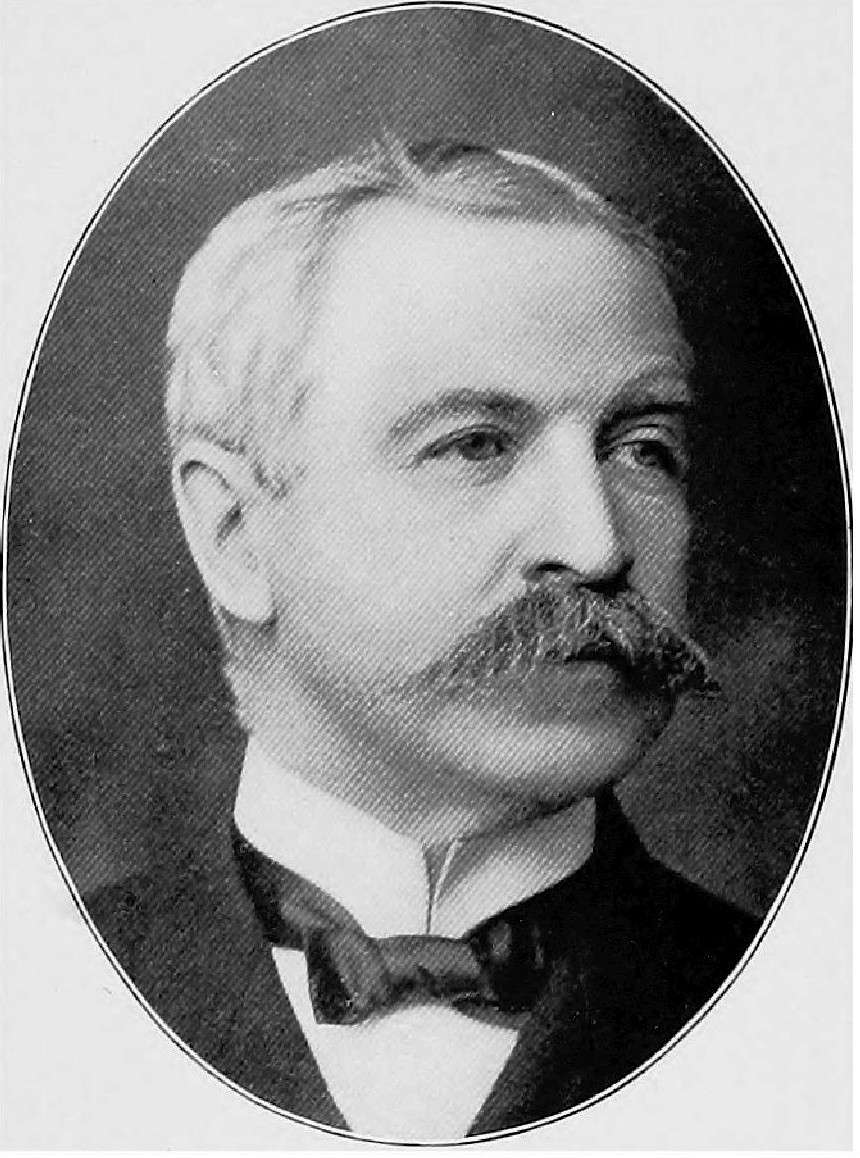
Louis Sherry in 1889

Louis Sherry (June 6, 1856 – June 9, 1926) was an American restaurateur, caterer, confectioner and hotelier during the Gilded Age and early 20th century. His name is typically associated with an upscale brand of candy and ice cream, and also the Sherry-Netherland Hotel in New York City.

== Early life ==
Sherry was born in St. Albans, Vermont, to parents of French-Canadian descent. Certain reports cite an early experience as a hotel busboy in Montreal, Canada. He eventually moved to New York City, and quickly made a name for himself in the restaurant business at the Hotel Brunswick (26th Street and Fifth Ave) and then as restaurant manager at the Hotel Elberon (Elberon, New Jersey).

== Businesses ==
=== Restaurants ===
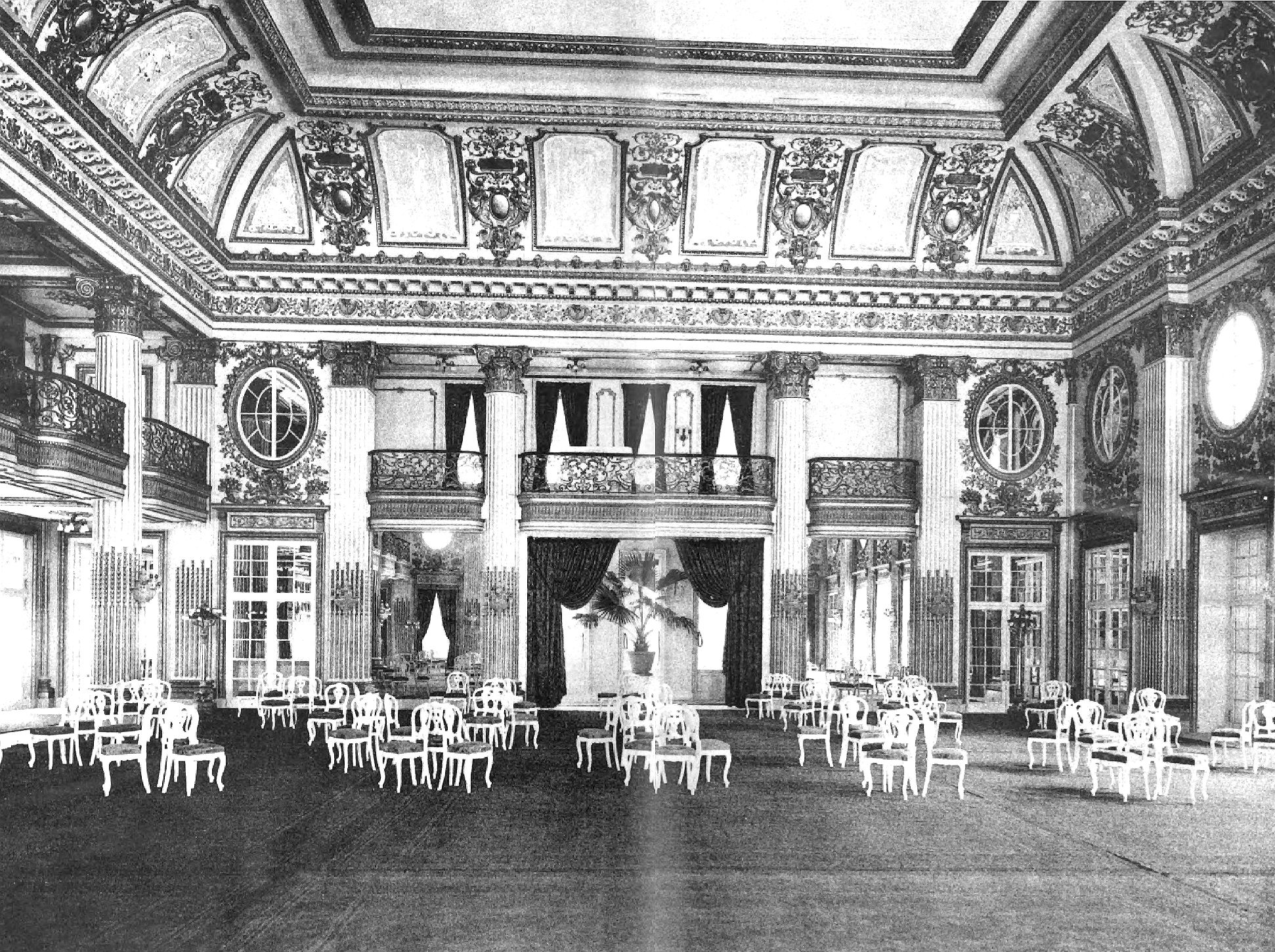
Ballroom at Sherrys restaurant in 1898

Around 1880, with $1,300 saved from his time at the Hotel Elberon, Sherry launched his first restaurant in New York City at 38th Street and Sixth Avenue. The new establishment struggled a bit at first, but Sherry's knack for "dainty decorations" and the "novelties of service" won a following from "The Four Hundred" (late 19th century term for New York City's social elite, coined by Ward McAllister). In a short time, Sherry upgraded to a larger (and more prestigious) location at 37th Street and Fifth Avenue. But even that location proved too small, and again the business upgraded to 44th Street and Fifth Avenue.

=== Confections ===
In 1919, with the advent of Prohibition, Sherry announced the closure of his restaurant and ballroom which "for a generation [had] been the scene of some of New York's most brilliant social gatherings." In place of the restaurant, Sherry immediately established Louis Sherry Inc., with a capitalization of $400,000, and the intent of performing "catering and the manufacture and sale of candies and pastries". He opened a new shop at 58th Street and Fifth Avenue for this business, and announced an "alliance" with the Waldorf-Astoria Hotel that involved both his candies and catering services. Although it was not disclosed at that time, at some point ownership of Louis Sherry Inc. was significantly vested in "Boomer-duPont interests" (a reference to Lucius M. Boomer, then chairman of the Waldorf-Astoria Hotel and T. Coleman du Pont).

=== Sherry-Netherland Hotel ===
Although it bears his name, it does not seem that Louis Sherry was personally involved in the landmark Sherry-Netherland Hotel. The "old" Netherland Hotel, originally built around 1892 for William Waldorf Astor, was acquired in 1924 by Frederick Brown, "an operator, [to] be remodeled into stores and apartments". It was not until March 1927 (nearly a year after Sherry's death) that the almost-complete "new" Netherland was acquired by Louis Sherry Inc. (through a subsidiary called The Sherry-Netherland Company). By that time the company was controlled by Boomer and du Pont through their "Boomer-du Pont Properties Corporation", which also owned the Waldorf-Astoria Hotel.

== Personal interests ==
Sherry was an avid equestrian and a wine connoisseur. He is interred at Woodlawn Cemetery in the Bronx, New York City.
