= Jack Krumpe =

American sports executive (1936–2020)

John H. Krumpe (January 26, 1936 – March 22, 2020) was an American sports executive who was CEO of the Madison Square Garden Corporation, New Jersey Sports and Exposition Authority, and Javits Center and president of the New York Racing Association, New York Rangers, New York Knicks, and New York Islanders.

== Early life ==
Krumpe was born on January 26, 1936, on Staten Island. He graduated from Curtis High School and Dartmouth College, where he majored in history and was a member of the football, basketball, rugby, and baseball teams. In 1959 he graduated from the New York University School of Business. Krumpe began his business career with Union Carbide, however, he soon left to join the New York Racing Association's accounting department.

== NYRA ==
In 1960, Krumpe joined the New York Racing Association as an accountant. He rose through the organization, as assistant director and later director of mutuels, vice president of mutuel operations, comptroller, and vice president in charge of operations. On July 13, 1972, he was named president of the NYRA, succeeding Frank M. Basil. He resigned as president on April 26, 1974, stating that the job was "no longer fun". He later added that he was frustrated with the state bureaucracy, which he believed had "no long term solutions to racing's problems".

== New Jersey Sports and Exposition Authority ==
On May 21, 1974, Krumpe was named CEO of the New Jersey Sports and Exposition Authority. The NJSEA oversaw the construction of the Meadowlands Sports Complex, which was to consist of a new football stadium for the New York Giants and a horse racing track. NJSEA Chairman Sonny Werblin called Krumpe "the top sports administrator in the United States, next to Pete Rozelle" and called Krumpe's hiring "my happiest announcement since the signing of Joe Namath".

== Madison Square Garden ==
On June 29, 1978, Krumpe resigned from the New Jersey Sports and Exposition Authority to become executive vice president of the Madison Square Garden Corporation. He joined Sonny Werblin, who joined MSG in December 1977. In September 1981, Krumpe was named president of the New York Rangers, succeeding William M. Jennings, who died a month earlier. When Michael Burke retired as president of Madison Square Garden Corporation and the New York Knicks the following year, Krumpe succeeded him in these posts. During his tenure as MSG's president, he fired general managers of both teams as well as Rangers coach Herb Brooks. In October 1985, Gulf+Western, MSG's parent company, hired Alan Fields to assume Krumpe's title of COO and control most of the arena's business and entertainment operations outside of the Rangers and Knicks. On July 17, 1986, Krumpe became president and CEO of the Jacob K. Javits Convention Center. He worked for both MSG and the Javits Center until Richard H. Evans was named president and CEO of Madison Square Garden Corporation on November 3, 1986.

== New York Islanders ==
In 1989, Krumpe left the Javits Center to become president of the New York Islanders. He remained in this position until the team was purchased by Cablevision in August 1992.

Preceded by Frank M. Basil	President of the New York Racing Association; 1972–74	Succeeded by Thomas J. FitzGerald
Preceded by Sonny Werblin	CEO of the New Jersey Sports and Exposition Authority; 1974–78	Succeeded by Robert G. Harter
Preceded by William M. Jennings	President of the New York Rangers; 1981–86	Succeeded by Richard Evans
Preceded by Michael Burke	President of the Madison Square Garden Corporation; President of the New York Knicks; 1982–86	Succeeded by Richard Evans
Preceded by Thomas F. Galvin	President of the Javits Center; 1986–89	Succeeded by Sol Chick Chaikin
Preceded by Bill Torrey	President of the New York Islanders; 1989–92	Succeeded by Jerome Grossman
