= Childs Restaurants =

Restaurant chain in the US and Canada (1889–1967)

Childs Company
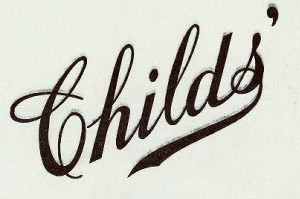
- Childs' logo of 1907

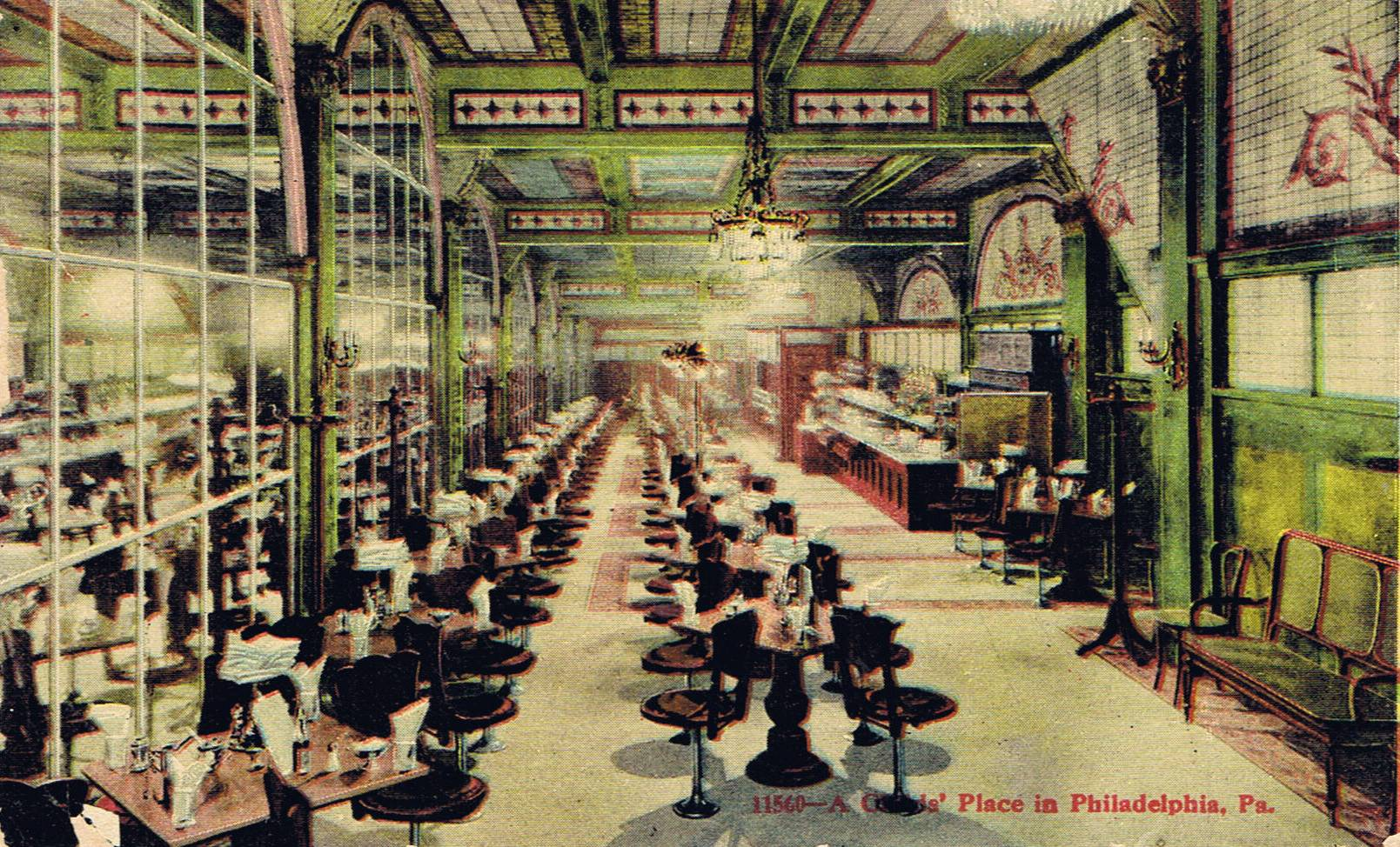
- Childs Restaurant, Philadelphia, Pennsylvania, c. 1908
- Industry: Restaurant
- Founded: Manhattan, New York City, United States (1889)
- Founder: Samuel Childs, William Childs
- Defunct: 1967; 59 years ago
- Fate: None in operation since the late 1960s
- Number of locations: 107 locations in 29 cities in 1925
- Area served: New York City and other northeastern U.S. cities
- Products: Pancakes, American cuisine

Childs Restaurants was one of the first national dining chains in the United States and Canada, having peaked in the 1920s and 1930s with about 125 locations in dozens of markets, serving over 50,000,000 meals a year, with over $37 million in assets at the time. Childs was a pioneer in several areas, including design, service, sanitation, and labor relations. It was a contemporary of food-service companies such as Horn & Hardart and a predecessor to companies such as McDonald's.

== History ==
=== Founding ===
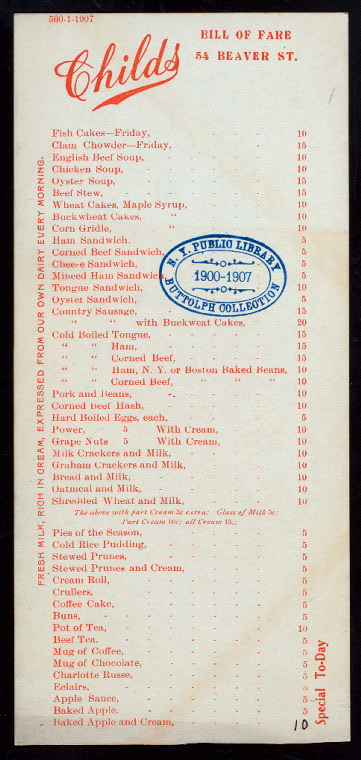
A Childs menu, c. 1907

The first Childs Restaurant was launched in 1889 by brothers Samuel S. Childs and William Childs, on the ground level of the Merchants Hotel at 41 Cortlandt Street (between Broadway and Church Streets, on the current site of the World Trade Center complex) in Manhattan's Financial District. The brothers' concept for the establishment was to provide economical meals to the working class, quickly, and with an unusually high emphasis – for the period – on cleanliness and hygiene. Their novel design featured white tiles, white uniforms, and female servers rather than the then-common male servers. In addition to these signature characteristics, Childs locations also featured their pancake griddles in the front window. Within five years, Childs had grown to five profitable locations. They also are credited as inventors of the "tray line" self-service cafeteria format, which they introduced in 1898 at their 130 Broadway location.

In 1898, the brothers, confident and ready for more aggressive expansion, combined with several investors to legally incorporate the Childs Unique Dairy Company, with capitalization of $1,000,000, and the stated intent to "establish and operate restaurants in New York City and elsewhere". It was widely speculated, and finally confirmed in 1912, that several officers of the Standard Oil Company were investors in the restaurant chain, including Henry Morgan Tilford and Charles Sweeney.

In 1899, F.O. Hendrick, a nephew of Samuel and William Childs, launched a casual luncheon restaurant at 142 Fulton Street, practically across the street from his uncles' first location on Cortlandt Street, which was by then ten years old and highly successful. After a short period of family competition, Hendrick ultimately brought his restaurant under the Childs umbrella. He remained an operating executive of Childs Restaurants until the family lost control.

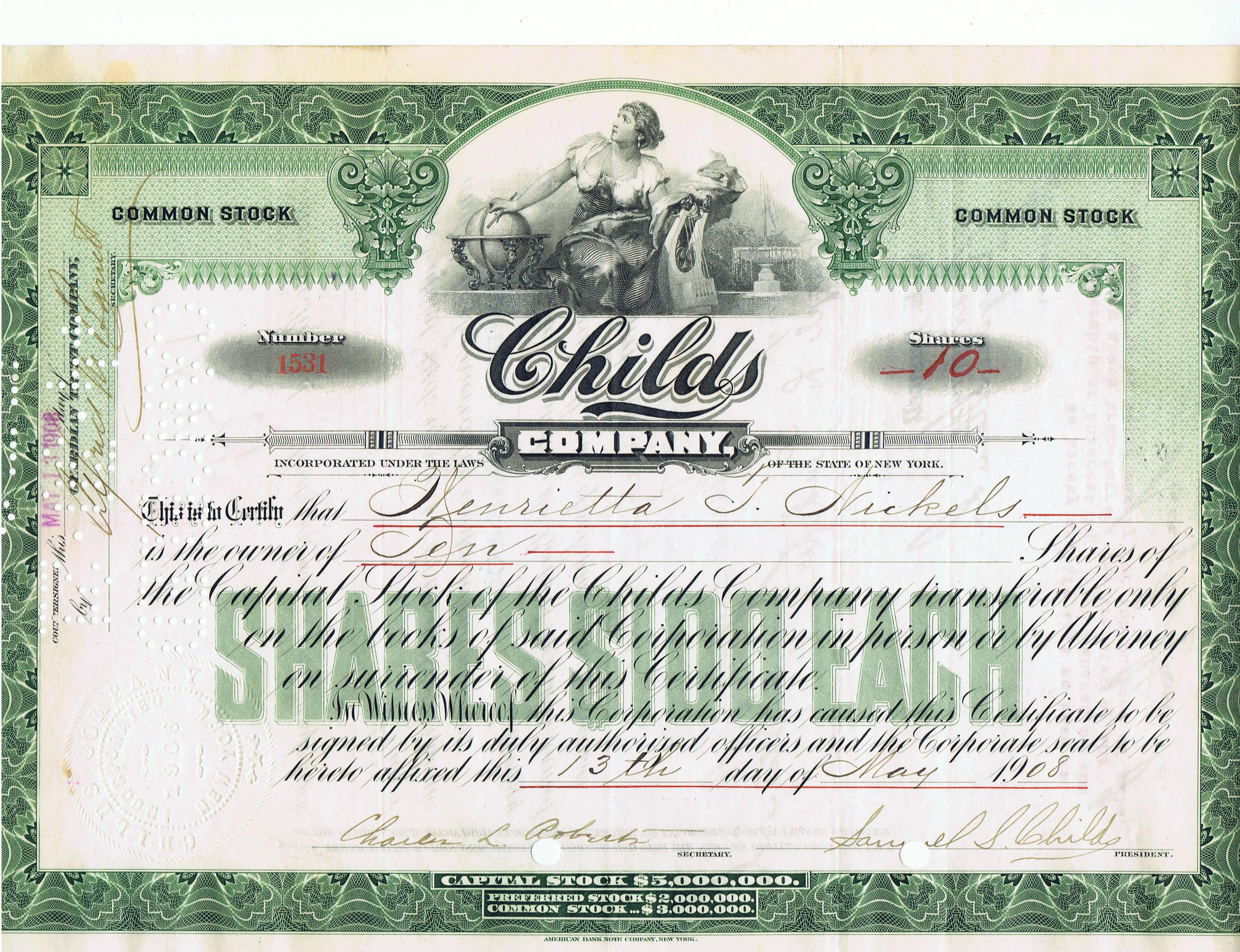
Childs Company Stock Certificate – 1908

In 1906, fifteen similar restaurants (called "green doors"), independently owned and operated by Ellsworth Childs (brother of Samuel and William), were consolidated into the company. Thereafter, Ellsworth remained an executive of Childs until he died in 1929, and is cited as a driving force behind the physical expansion during that period.

Childs' Restaurant in New York City, 1900s

=== Peak years ===
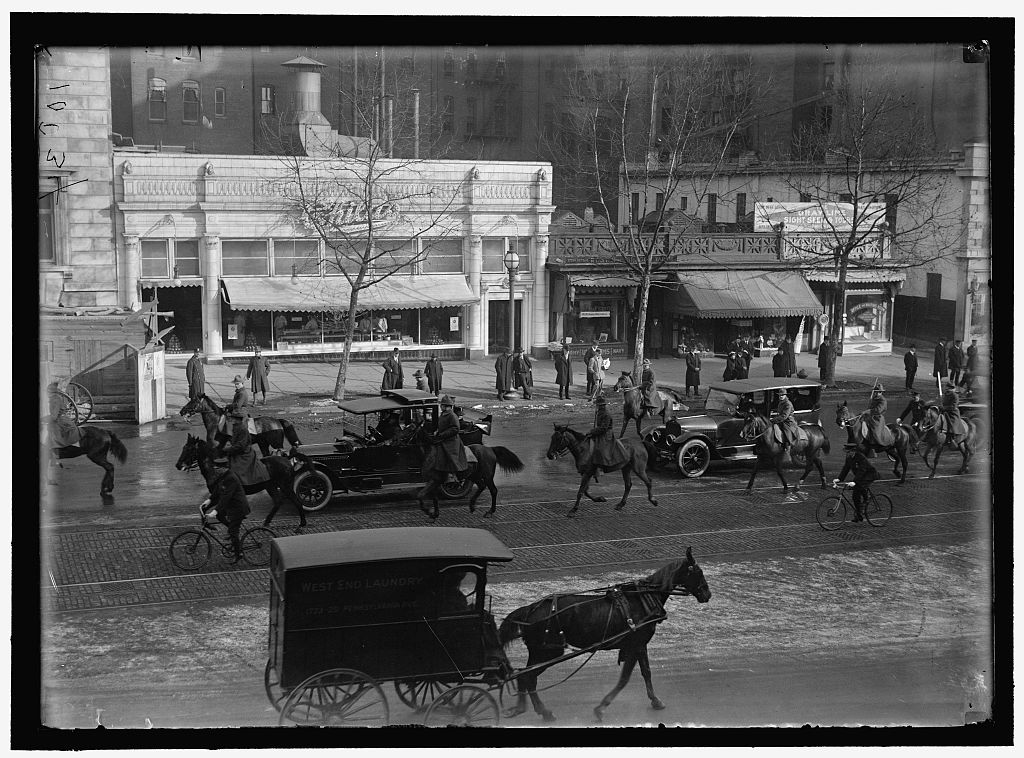
Exterior of a Childs on Pennsylvania Avenue, Washington, DC, in 1917

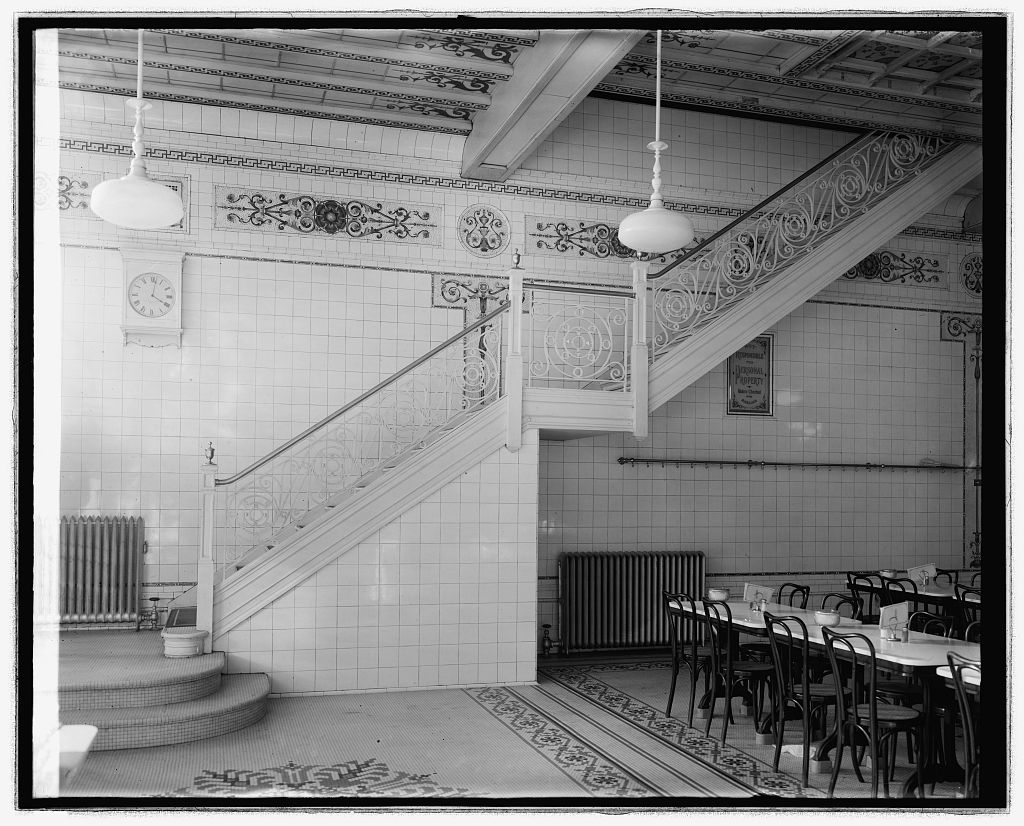
Interior of a Washington, DC location, c. 1920

In September 1919, the company launched an employee stock ownership plan for its restaurant managers, and three years later, extended the plan to all employees. Within 10 years, employees would own almost 25% of the company's common stock.

In November 1920, an article in The Magazine of Wall Street, entitled "Where Everybody Eats Now and Then," called Childs "a national institution. Millions of people eat there at least once in a while and some eat much more often. . . . Most of the people who go into Childs' go in for quick lunches but you can get anything there from a doughnut to a steak."

By 1925, the chain operated 107 locations in 29 cities, served 50,000,000 meals every year, and was reporting consistent annual profits of $2,000,000. The company also grew to include other real estate interests. In March 1925, company president Samuel S. Childs died. However, he had not been personally involved in the business for some time, instead focusing on his political career and many other civic and business activities. Operation of the restaurants had long been delegated to his brother and co-founder William, as vice president and general manager, and other family members.

The late 1920s witnessed a roller-coaster of events for the company. In November 1925, the Childs company became a major partner in the development of the landmark Savoy-Plaza Hotel, at Fifth Avenue and 59th Street. Around 1927, William Childs began to impose his vegetarian dietary preferences on the chain's menu, which generated significant backlash from customers and his fellow managers and investors. The company's stock reached a low of $44 in 1928, and during a board meeting on December 12, 1928, William was pressed into resigning as president, but remained chairman of the board. At the following board meeting on January 30, 1929, William attempted to turn the tide by firing several executive officers and company directors, replacing them with family members. A proxy battle ensued, but on March 7, 1929, William and his supporters lost the fight to retain control of the company he co-founded 40 years before, by then valued around $37,000,000. He did retain a modest non-controlling equity position, which he eventually sold and/or bequeathed.

=== Decline and rebirth ===
In the 1930s, no longer under the direction of the Childs family, the chain returned meat to its menus, introduced alcohol at many locations (after the repeal of Prohibition), and launched a new subsidiary division called "The Host", meant to be lower-priced than Childs. The company also obtained a hot dog vending license for the 1939 World's Fair in Flushing Meadows, which proved to be a financial mistake.

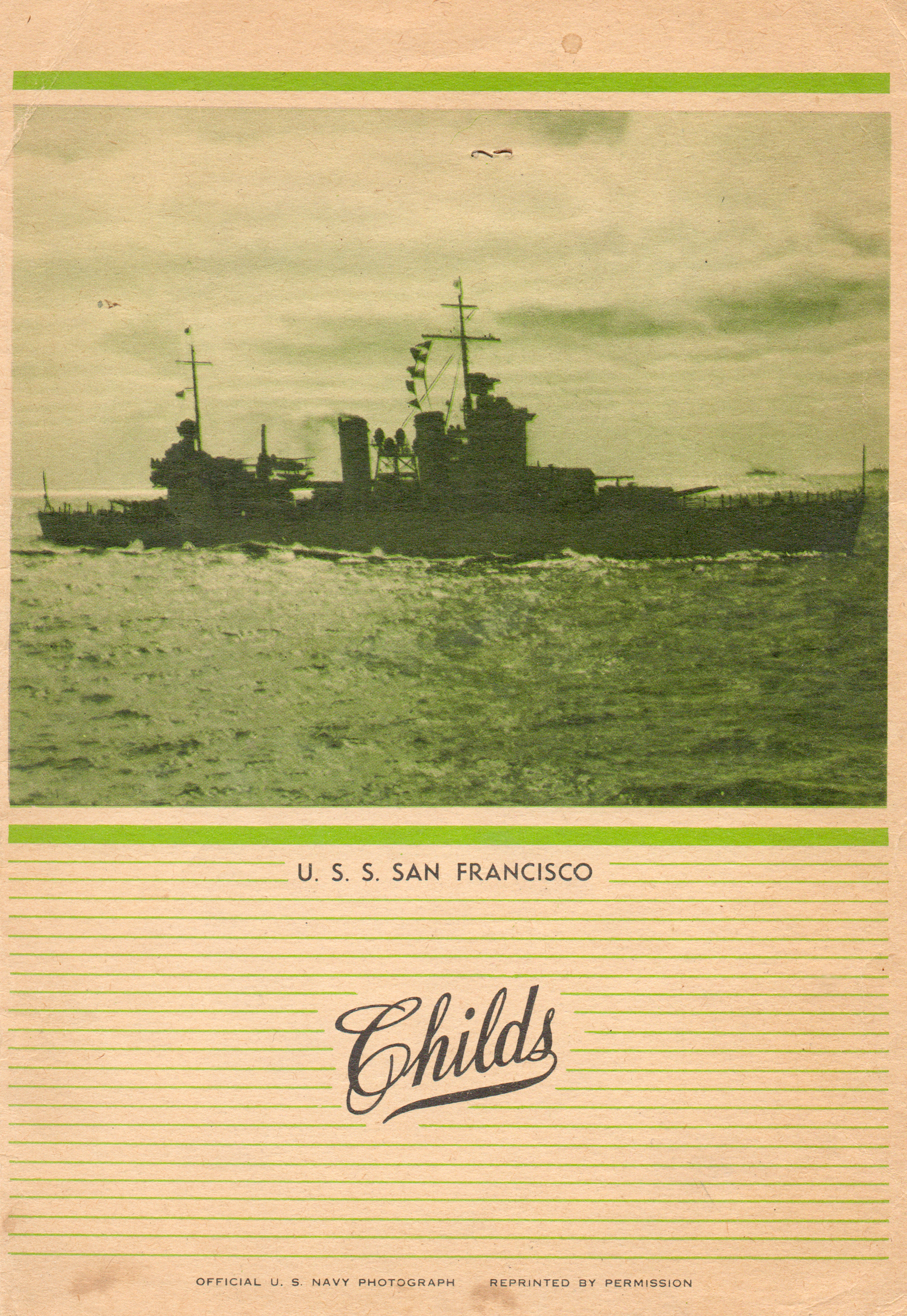
Childs WWII era menu cover c. 1943

In August 1943, under pressure of significant debt maturity, the company filed for bankruptcy reorganization. Childs emerged from bankruptcy in 1947, and continued to operate through the 1940s and 1950s.

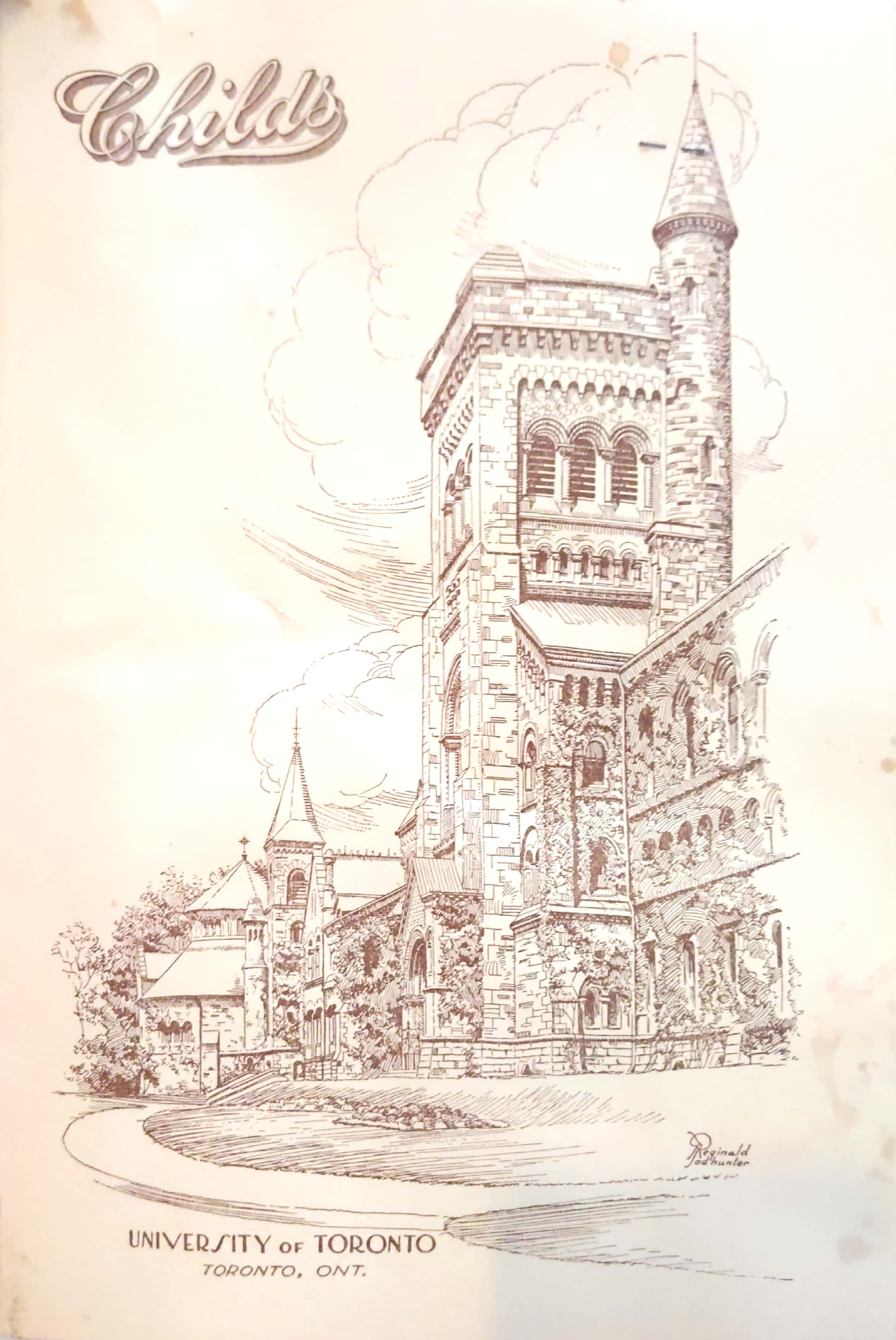
Childs menu from Toronto, Ont.1946

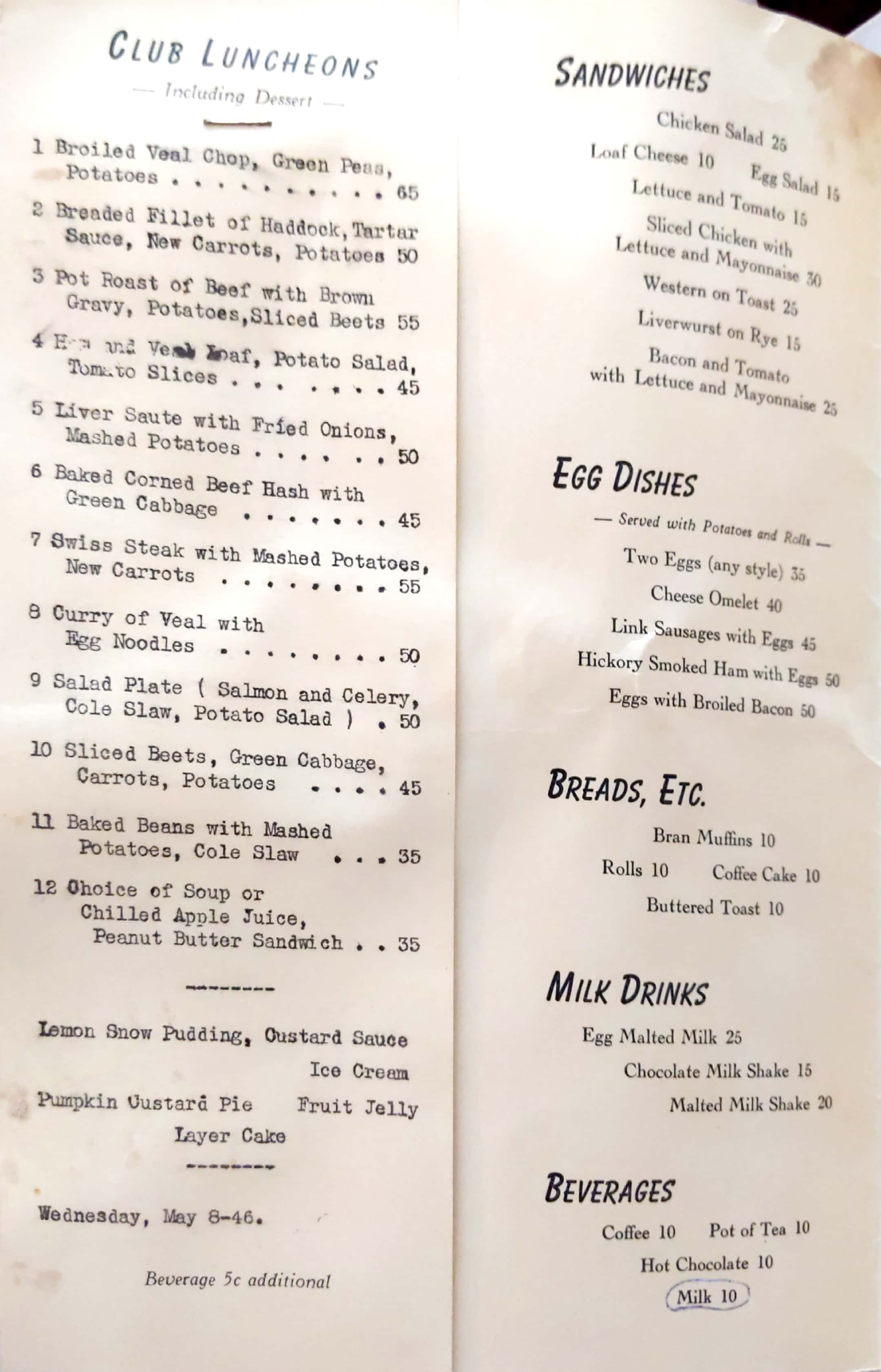
Childs menu

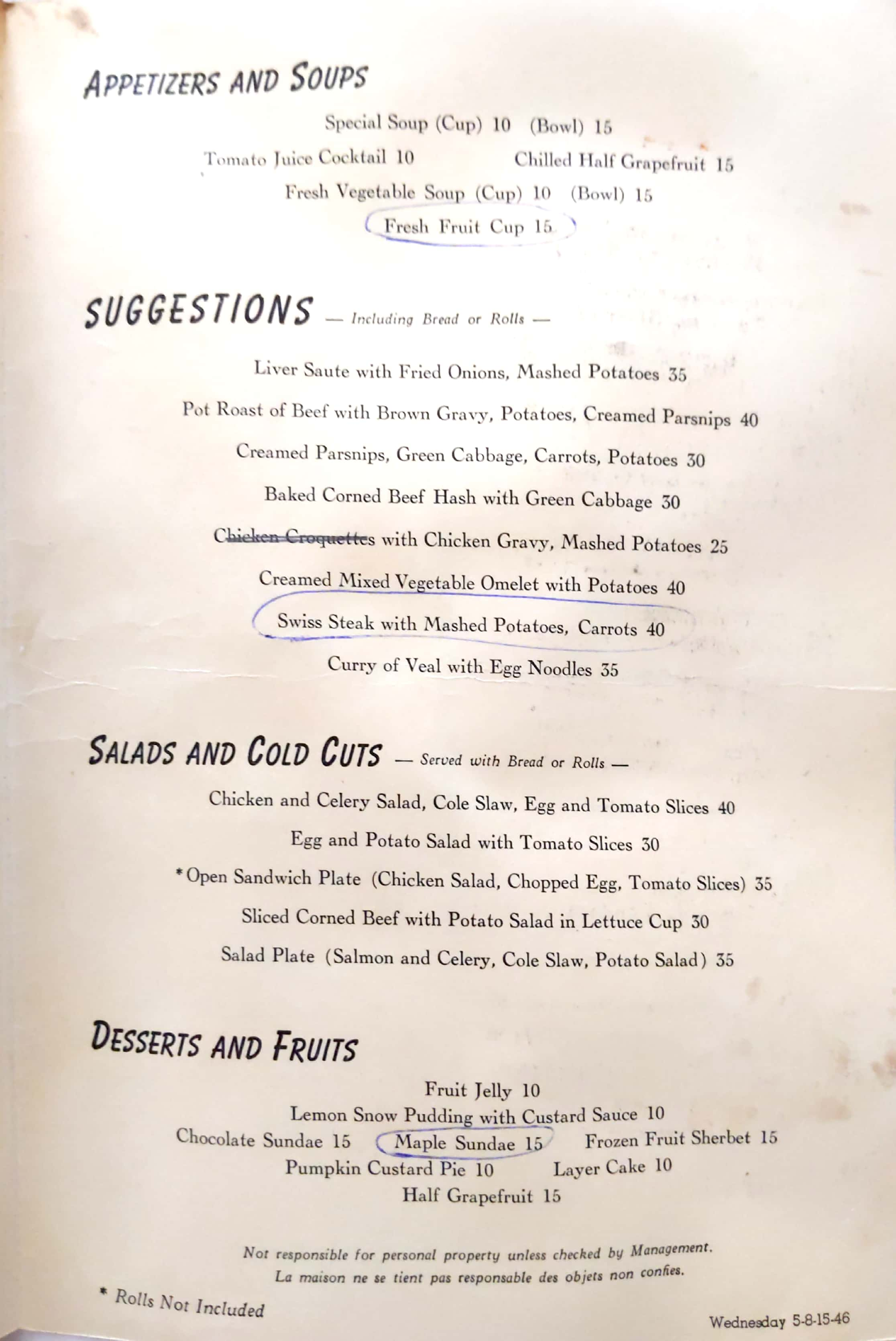
Childs menu

By 1950, the company had shrunk to only 53 locations and was losing money. Nonetheless, it managed to acquire the candy and ice cream maker Louis Sherry Inc.; it announced several significant operational changes, including "returning to its old custom of flap-jack making in the windows" and the introduction of prepared meats to eliminate the need for on-site butchering.

In 1955, a young hotelier named A.M. "Sonny" Sonnabend assumed the presidency of the Childs company and pointed the enterprise in a new direction. In a series of coordinated transactions, the company's name was changed to Hotel Corporation of America, it acquired the Plaza Hotel in New York (across the street from the Savoy-Plaza Hotel, which Childs had developed), and entered into long-term leases for three other hotels in Boston, Cleveland, and Chicago. The company was then structured into three divisions: restaurants, manufacturing and distribution of packaged foods (via subsidiaries Recipe Foods, Fred Fear, and Louis Sherry), and hotels.

In 1961, substantially all of the remaining Childs restaurant operations, now greatly diminished in number and considered part of the company's past, were sold to the Riese Organization (National Restaurants Management Inc.), which as of 2009 operates more than 100 restaurants throughout New York City, including franchised units of Dunkin' Donuts, KFC, Pizza Hut, T.G.I. Friday's and Houlihan's. A number of the Riese properties are former Childs Restaurants.

In 1970, Hotel Corporation of America (formerly Childs) was again renamed, to Sonesta International Hotels Corporation (Nasdaq: SNSTA). As of 2009, the company operates 25 hotels on three continents, and owns several cruise ships, and is still led by the Sonnabend family.

== Architecture ==
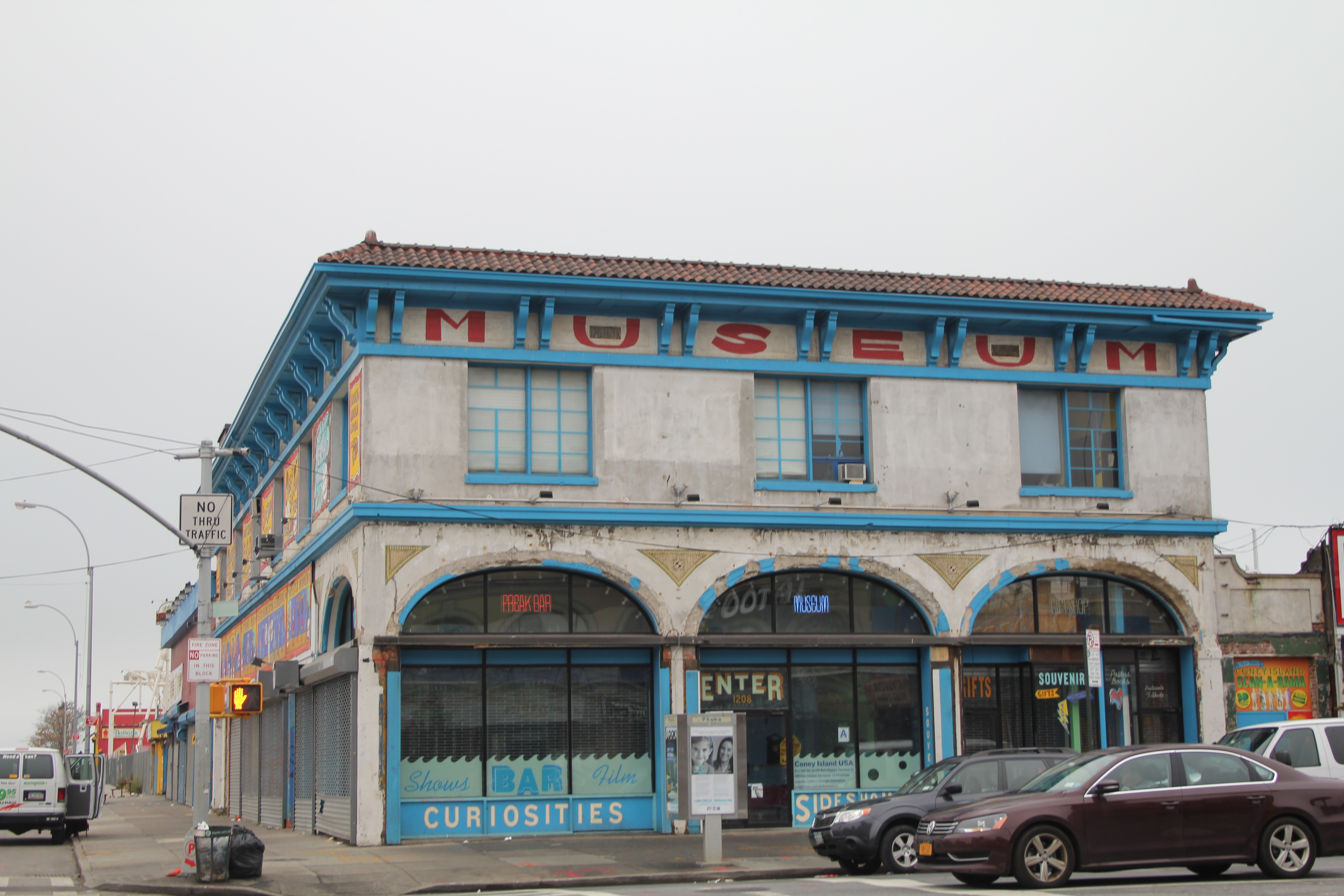
Surf Avenue, Coney Island, completed 1917

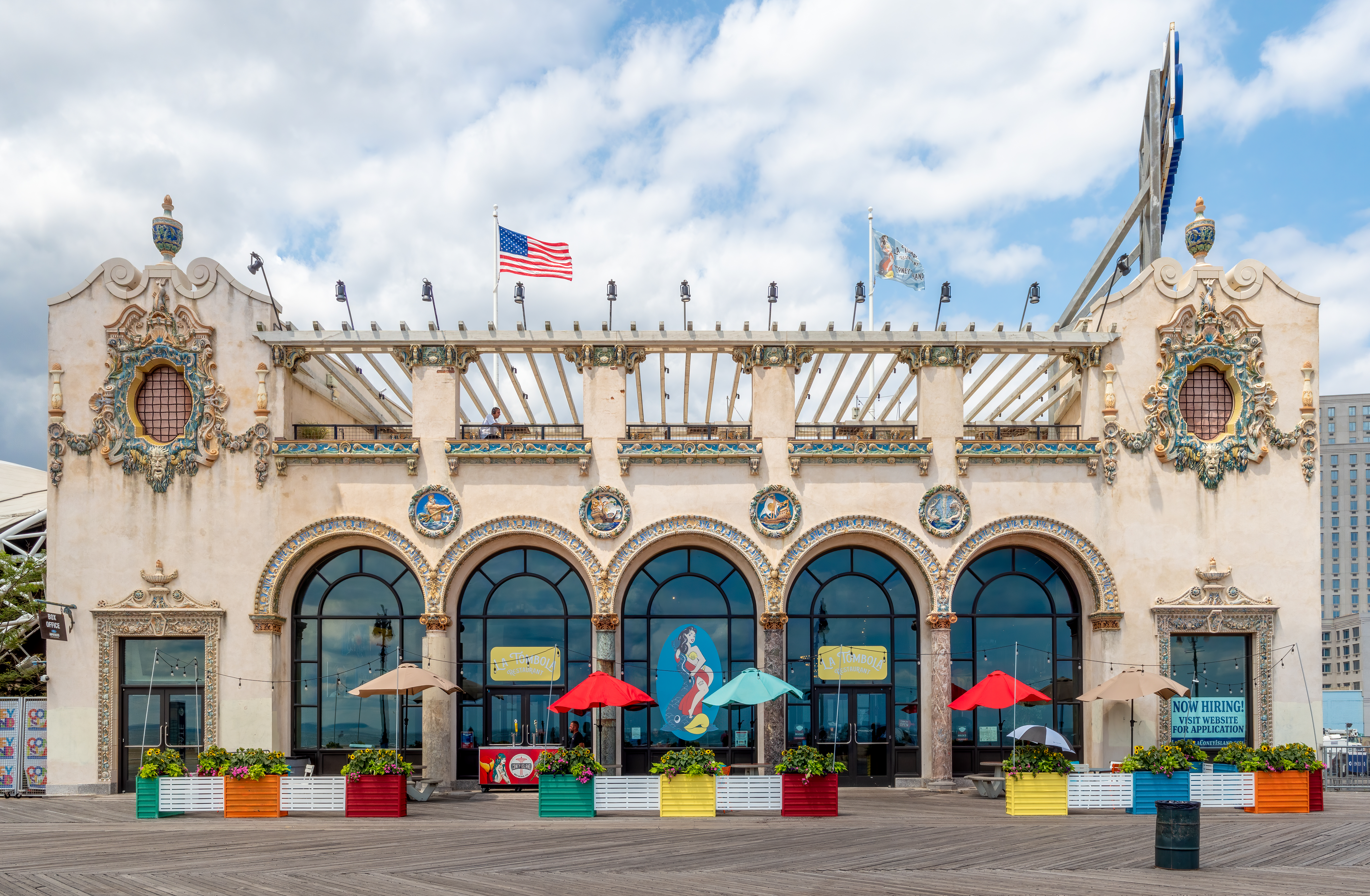
Boardwalk, Coney Island, completed 1923

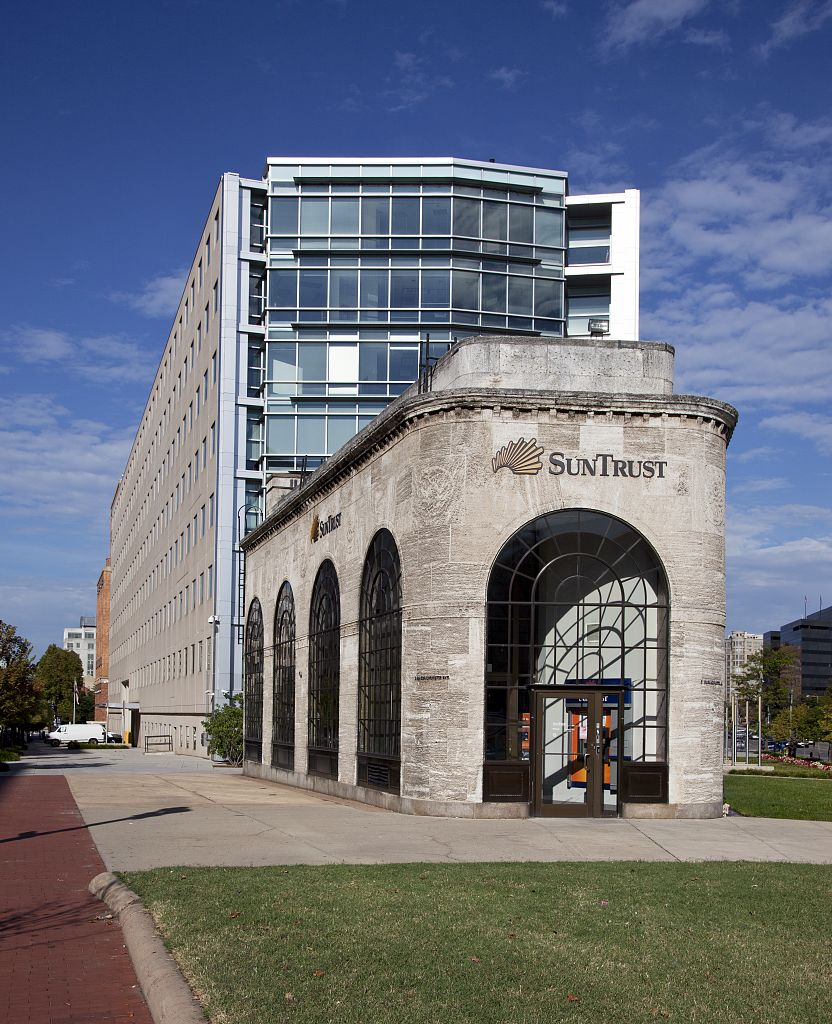
Washington, DC, completed 1925

Despite their market position, Childs Restaurants were distinguished for their architectural quality, and former locations continue to be appreciated by historic preservationists. In his design and construction efforts, William Childs and his internal architect of 30 years, John Corley Westervelt, consulted and engaged respected architects including William Van Alen (modernist designer of the Chrysler Building), Hirons & Dennison, Pruitt & Brown, and McKim, Mead, and White. One design critique from 1924 declared that Childs "stands as a milestone marking an enormous advance in the taste of what we are pleased to describe as the 'common people' of America". In more recent years, celebrated architect Robert A.M. Stern described the Childs design as "austerely-elegant", and recognized their savvy in tailoring design to environment, such as in midtown Manhattan, where Childs was the first to make "dramatic use of large sheets of curved glass for corner windows", now a common technique.

=== Notable locations ===
The table that follows is an incomplete list of locations built for Childs that reflect the company's style. Note that references often have pictures and more detailed histories, and links in the Address column, where provided, link to individual Wikipedia articles about the buildings listed:

| Place | Address | Completed | Notes and 2014 Status | References |
|---|---|---|---|---|
| Manhattan, NY | 815 Broadway | 1897 | By John C. Westervelt. It is used as a small commercial building. | |
| Manhattan, NY | 36 West 34th Street | 1904 | By John C. Westervelt (alteration of 1885 building). It is used as a commercial building. Westervelt's office was here until he died in 1934. | |
| Manhattan, NY | 194 Broadway | 1911 | By John C. Westervelt. Demolished in 2007 to build the Fulton Center at the existing Fulton Street station. | |
| Brooklyn, NY | 1208 Surf Avenue | 1917 | By John C. Westervelt. Closed 1943. Designated New York City landmark, home of Coney Island USA arts organization. | |
| Toronto, ON | 279 Yonge Street | 1918 | By John C. Westervelt. Closed by 1963. In use as a Hard Rock Cafe until c. 2015. Currently a Shoppers Drug Mart. | |
| Brooklyn, NY | 530 Fulton Street | 1919 | By John C. Westervelt. It is used as a commercial building. | |
| Manhattan, NY | 377 Fifth Avenue | 1921 | By Severance and Van Alen. It is used as a commercial building. | |
| Brooklyn, NY | 219 South 4th Street | 1922 | Has plaque with what looks like a Childs logo and year built, but Brooklyn phone books of the period indicate it was occupied by a ladies tailor business called "Childs Bros." that despite its similar name had no known connection to the restaurant chain. Presently, a commercial building. | |
| Brooklyn, NY | 2102 Boardwalk | 1923 | By Dennison & Hirons. Closed in 1952. Designated New York City landmark, now part of Ford Amphitheater at Coney Island. Prototype for later nautical-themed buildings. | |
| Manhattan, NY | 604 Fifth Avenue | 1925 | By William Van Alen. Altered, in use as a T.G.I. Fridays until 2015. | |
| Queens, NY | 63-19 Roosevelt Avenue | 1925 | Nautical theme. It is used as a commercial building. | |
| Manhattan, NY | 421 Seventh Avenue | 1926 | By William Van Alen. A 14-story building housed a restaurant on the ground floor and some corporate functions above. By 1940, the restaurant had moved next door to 425 Seventh Ave. Altered, in use as an office building with ground-floor retail. | |
| Washington, D.C. | 2 Massachusetts Avenue NW | 1926 | By William Van Alen. Closed 1955. In use as a bank. | |
| Atlantic City, NJ | Boardwalk at South Carolina Avenue | 1927 | Nautical theme. Attributed to George P. Post. It is used as a commercial building. | |
| Queens, NY | 36-01 Broadway | 1928 | Nautical theme. It is used as a commercial building. | |
| Trenton, NJ | 12-14 East State Street | 1928 | Modernist, designer not known. Closed by the 1950s. Demolished in 1987. | |
| Manhattan, NY | 811 6th Avenue | 1930 | Nautical theme. Altered, in use as a McDonald's. | |
| Queens, NY | 67-09 Fresh Pond Road | 1930 est. | Nautical theme. It is used as a bank and a small office building. | |
| Brooklyn, NY | 534 Flatbush Avenue | 1931 | Nautical theme. It is used as a commercial building. | |
| Queens, NY | 59-37 Queens Boulevard | 1931 | Nautical theme. It is used as a commercial building. | |
| Queens, NY | 45-02 43rd Avenue | 1931 | Nautical theme. It is used as a commercial building. | |
| Brooklyn, NY | 6620 18th Avenue | 1931 | Nautical theme. Demolished c. 2007. | |
| Queens, NY | 15-02 College Point Blvd. | 1931 est. | Nautical theme. It is used as a commercial building. | |
| Brooklyn, NY | 1801 Avenue M | 1931 est. | Nautical theme. It is used as a commercial building. | |
| Queens, NY | 245-01 Jamaica Avenue | 1932 | Nautical theme. It is used as a commercial building. | |

Closing dates, where known, are indicated in the above table. None of the nautical-themed restaurants built in the early 1930s appear in 1940 telephone directories, indicating that Childs' had vacated those structures by that date. The earlier locations in Manhattan and Brooklyn do appear in those directories, except for the very early location at 815 Broadway and the South 4th Street location, which is not known to have been a restaurant.

The following locations were not necessarily built by the Childs Company, but are notable for other reasons:

- New York
  - 41 Cortlandt Street, New York, NY (first location)
  - 42 East 14th Street, New York, NY (longtime corporate headquarters, also housed a restaurant)
  - 200 Fifth Avenue, New York, NY (corporate headquarters in later years)
  - 3 Beaver Street, New York, NY (Demolished in 1928 to build part of 26 Broadway, also known as the Standard Oil Building)
  - 1501 Broadway (at 43rd Street), New York, NY (below the Paramount Theater)
  - 1551–1553 Broadway (at 46th St NW corner), New York, NY
  - 1546 Broadway (between 45th & 46th Streets), New York, NY
  - 2276 Broadway (at 82nd Street), New York, NY
  - 300–304 W 59th St (SW Corner Columbus Circle), New York, NY
  - 1939 New York World's Fair: this temporary location, in the Fair's Railroad Building, seated 1000 patrons, and featured elaborate murals.
- Washington, D.C.
  - 1423 Pennsylvania Avenue N.W., Washington, DC
- New Jersey
  - Tennessee Avenue, Atlantic City, NJ, replaced in 1927 by a company-built location one block away at South Carolina Avenue
- Missouri
  - 218-220 North Seventh St & 614-616 Olive St, St. Louis. The North Seventh location was leased in 1903 in expectation of the crowds at the Louisiana Purchase Exposition in 1904. In 1912, Child's leased 614–616 Olive St, which abutted the back of their N. Seventh St. location, allowing for entrance to the expanded restaurant from both streets. Childs added a second story to the building in 1915, by which point they were the stated owners of the property. Both locations would become referenced in advertising from 1915 until 1935, when the location closed.
  - 804 Washington St, St. Louis.
  - 1121 Walnut St, Kansas City.
- Maryland
  - 18 North Charles St, Baltimore. 1906-1953
- Rhode Island
  - 142 Westminster St., Providence. 1910-1974
- Georgia
  - 10 Marietta St., Atlanta.

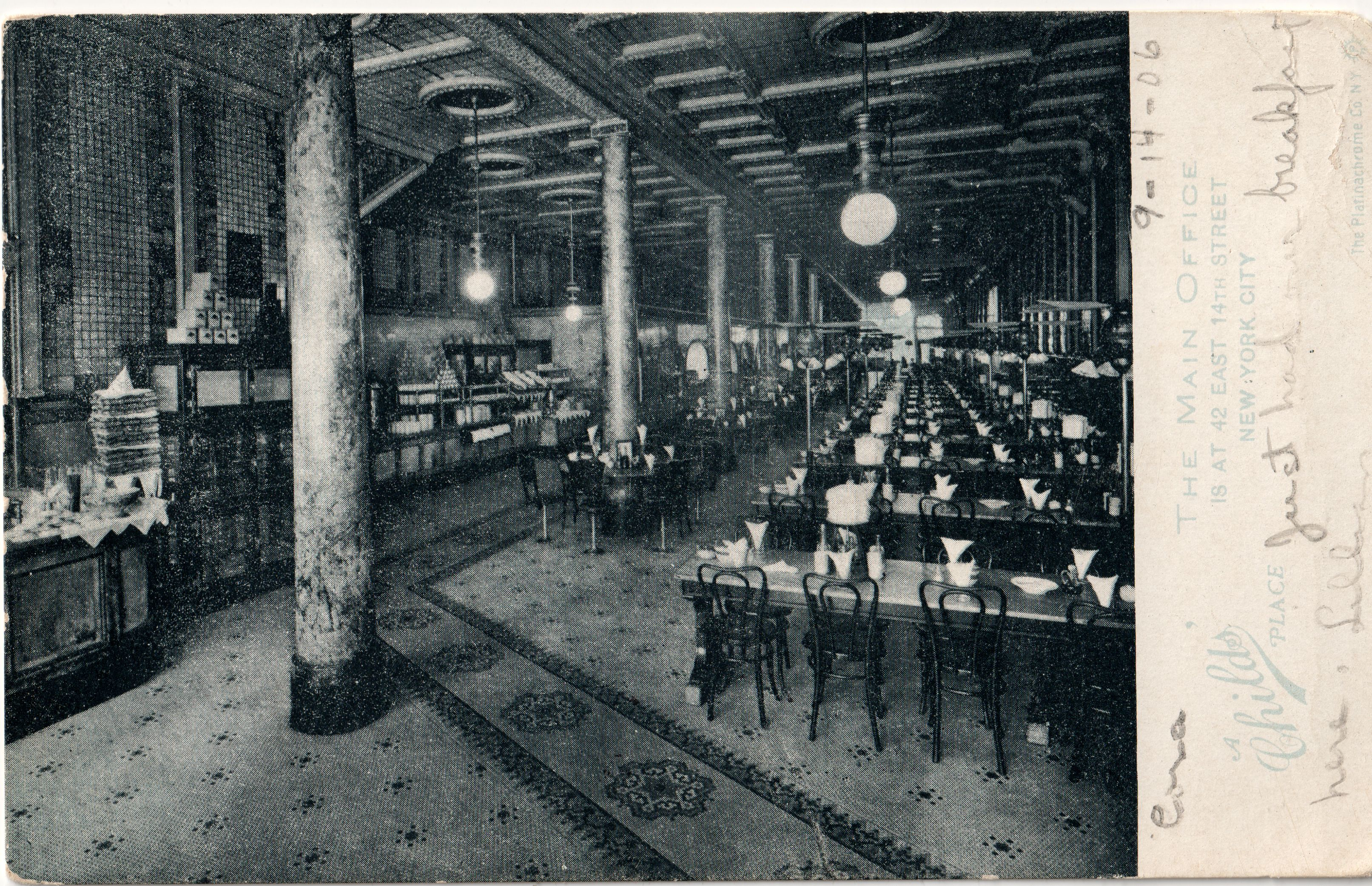
Childs' Place main office restaurant dining room at 42 East 14th Street, New York City, about 1906

== Related businesses ==
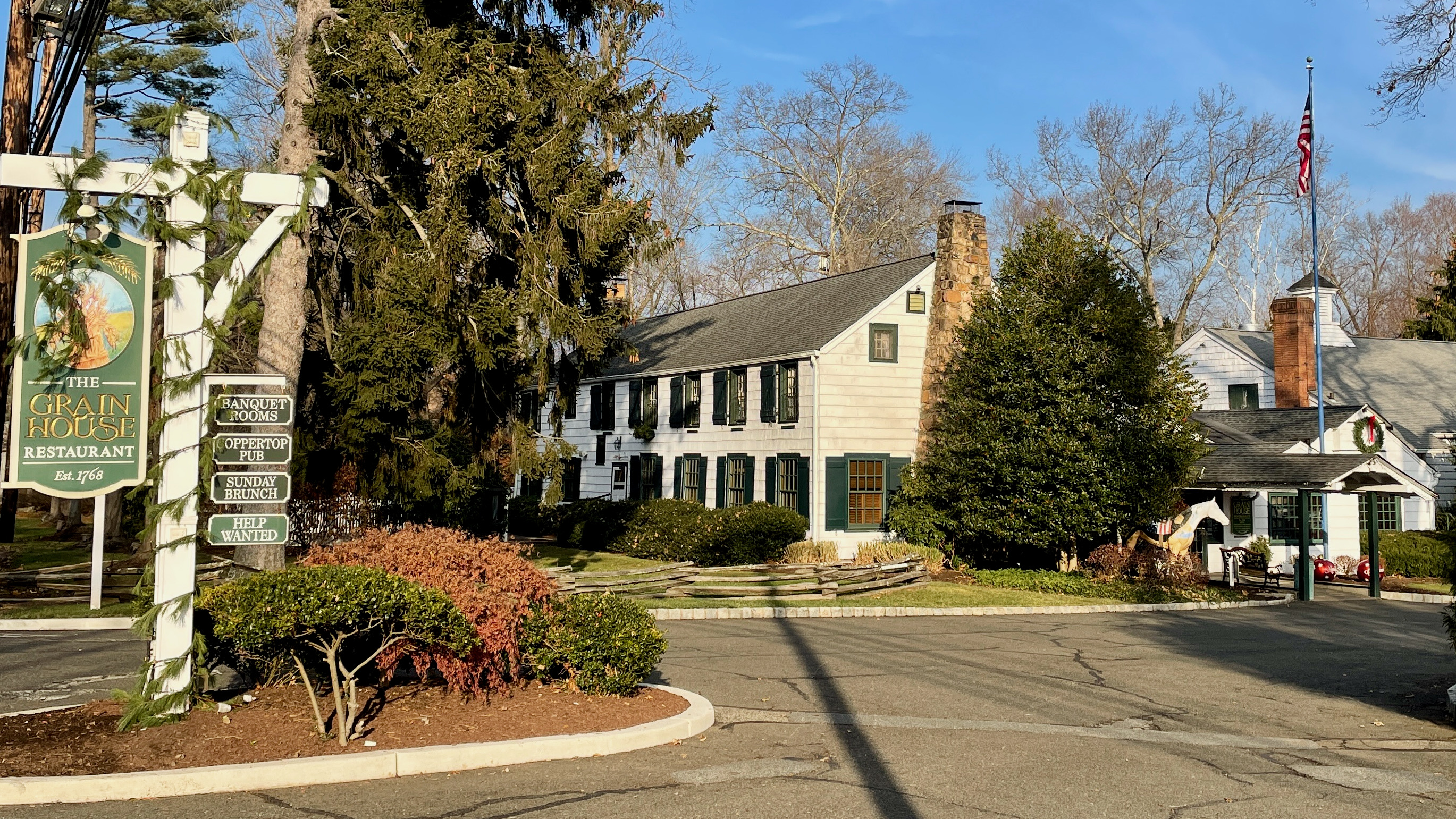
Grain House Restaurant in Franklin Corners

Although legally separate from the core Childs Restaurants chain, the founders and various family members operated several other businesses throughout the 20th century. Below are summaries of those operations.

In 1929, William Childs purchased a historic property near his home in Franklin Corners, New Jersey and converted it – without making any structural modifications – to an inn and restaurant. The Olde Mill Inn and The Grain House Restaurant. This upscale operation was distinctly different from the traditional Childs Restaurants, yet it also met with great success. The family continued to operate it for some time, but The Olde Mill Inn and Grain House Restaurant was eventually acquired by The Bocina Group, which continues to operate it as of 2009.

In December 1929, after being ousted from the core company, William Childs announced that the family had taken over the Archambault Restaurant at 2678 Broadway, and would relaunch it as "Old Algiers" – the first in a series of "old-world" themed restaurants. In this business, he partnered primarily with three nephews, Ellsworth E. Childs, William S. Childs, and Wallace A. Childs. The new company was soon organized under the corporate name Old London Inc., which was also the theme of their second 1,000-seat location, launched in 1931 at 130 West 42nd Street. This enterprise did not expand much further, likely due to William's advancing age. He died in 1938, and is buried behind the Basking Ridge Presbyterian Church near his New Jersey estate, with a large number of other Childs family members.

As of 2009, the original F.O. Hendrick location is still an operating diner, now called the Anytime Cafe.

== Key executives ==
=== Family-controlled period ===
- Samuel S. Childs, co-founder and president (1889–1925)
- William Childs, co-founder, vice president and general manager (1889–1925), chairman and president (1925–1929/30)
- Luther Childs, director (? – 1929)
- Ellsworth Childs, director (1906–1929), treasurer (1929)
- William S. Childs, director (? – 1929)
- F.O. Hendrick, general manager (? – 1929)
- William A. Barber, general counsel

=== Later period ===
- S. Willard Smith, president (1929–1931)
- William P. Allen, president (c. 1932)
- George D. Strohmeyer, president (1933–1941)
- Edward C. Field, president (1941–1948)
- John F.X. Finn, court-appointed trustee (1943–1947)
- John L. Hennessey, president (1948–1949) (former president of Statler Co., Inc.)
- John J. Bergen, chairman (c. 1950)
- N. Clarkson Earl Jr., president (1950–1951) (former executive at Howard Johnson's Restaurants)
- Charles Crouch, executive vice president (c. 1950)
- Abraham M. Sonnabend, president (1954–1963) (Converted Childs into Hotel Corporation of America, later Sonesta International Hotels Corporation)

== In popular culture ==
=== In music ===
The song "By the Beautiful Sea", written by Harry Carroll and Harold R. Atteridge in 1914, includes the lines:

Joe was quite a sport on a Sunday,
Though he would eat at Childs on a Monday

The song "Manhattan", written by Rodgers and Hart in 1925 for the musical revue Garrick Gaieties, and famously recorded by Tony Bennett, Ella Fitzgerald and others, includes the lines:

We'll go to Yonkers – where true love conquers – in the wilds,
And starve together dear – in Childs

=== In print ===
The 1920 novel Main Street, written by Sinclair Lewis, talks of the main characters eating at a Childs restaurant to economize while traveling to Minneapolis.

The poem "Spain in Fifty-Ninth Street", written by E.B. White and originally published in The New Yorker in 1935, tells the story of a brief but emotional interaction between a Childs hostess and a random customer (described as a "man of affairs") at the "Spanish Childs" location, presumably on 59th Street. White wrote some other short stories and poems that referenced or featured Childs, likely due to the daily presence of the establishments in his life during the late 1920s and 1930s in New York City.

=== In film ===
A Childs restaurant is shown during a montage of the streets of Manhattan being cleared by police during the rampage of the Rhedosaurus in The Beast from 20,000 Fathoms.

The opening montage sequence of Neil Simon and Gene Saks' 1968 film The Odd Couple includes a shot of a neon-signed Childs restaurant in New York City, one of several locations Felix Ungar (Jack Lemmon) visits before checking into a fleabag hotel to try to commit suicide.

Taxi Driver directed by Martin Scorsese 1976. Main character Travis Bickle takes Betsy, played by Cybill Shepard, to Child's restaurant in Columbus Circle on their first date.

=== In television ===
Jimmy Darmody suggests to Richard Harrow, "Let's go get a steak" [at Childs] in the season 2 finale of Boardwalk Empire, "To the Lost".

=== Onstage ===
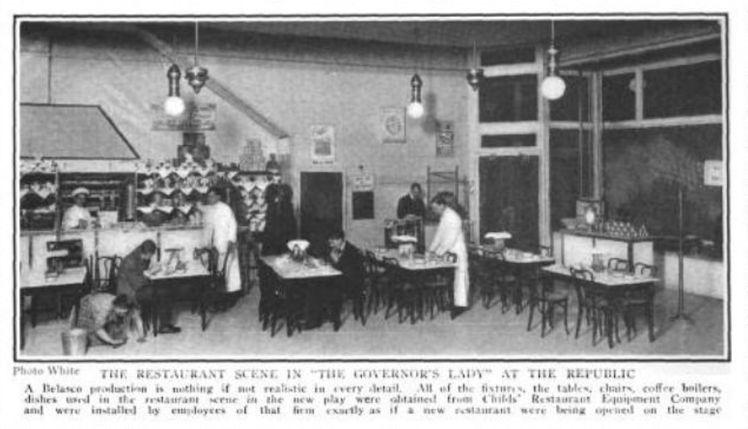
Childs Restaurant Scene in The Governor's Lady

Playwright David Belasco incorporated a complete reproduction of a Childs Restaurant in his 1912 production of Alice Bradley's The Governor's Lady.

The 1936 play You Can't Take It with You by George S. Kaufman and Moss Hart features the character The Grand Duchess Olga Katrina, a displaced cousin of the Czar, who works as a waitress at Childs.

Composer George Antheil, who spent part of the 1920s in New York City, selected a Childs Restaurant as one of several iconic American locations (along with the Bowery and the Brooklyn Bridge) for the setting of his 1930 opera Transatlantic.

In the 1953 musical Wonderful Town, which depicted life in New York City during the 1930s, the song "What a Waste" (music by Leonard Bernstein; lyrics by Betty Comden and Adolph Green) in Act I includes the lyrics:

Girl from Mobile,
Versatile actress,
Tragic or comic,
Any old play,

Suffered and starved,
Met Stanislavsky.
He said the world would
Cheer her some day.
Came to New York,
Repertoire ready,
Chekhov's and Shakespeare's and Wilde's.
Now, they watch her flipping flapjacks at Childs.

What a waste,
What a waste,
What a waste of money and time!
