= Sherry's =

Restaurant in New York City

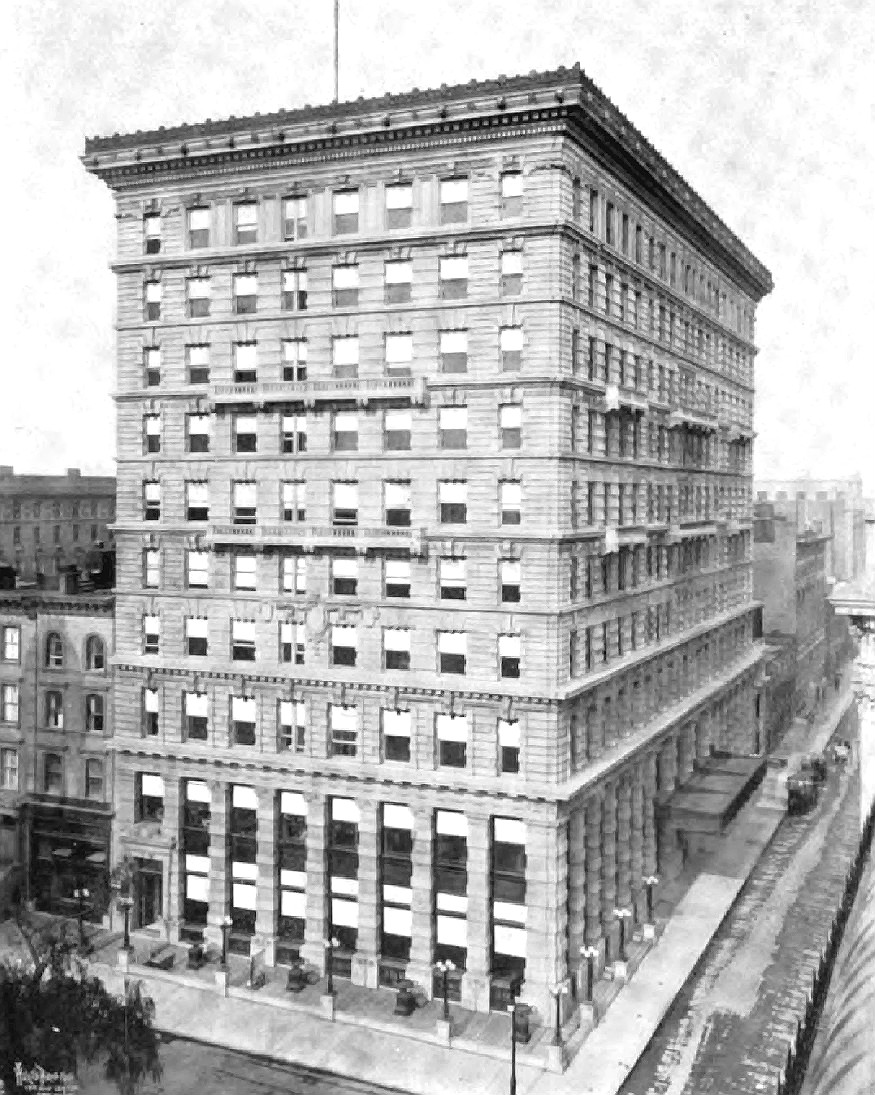
Sherry's in 1901 on 44th Street and Fifth Avenue

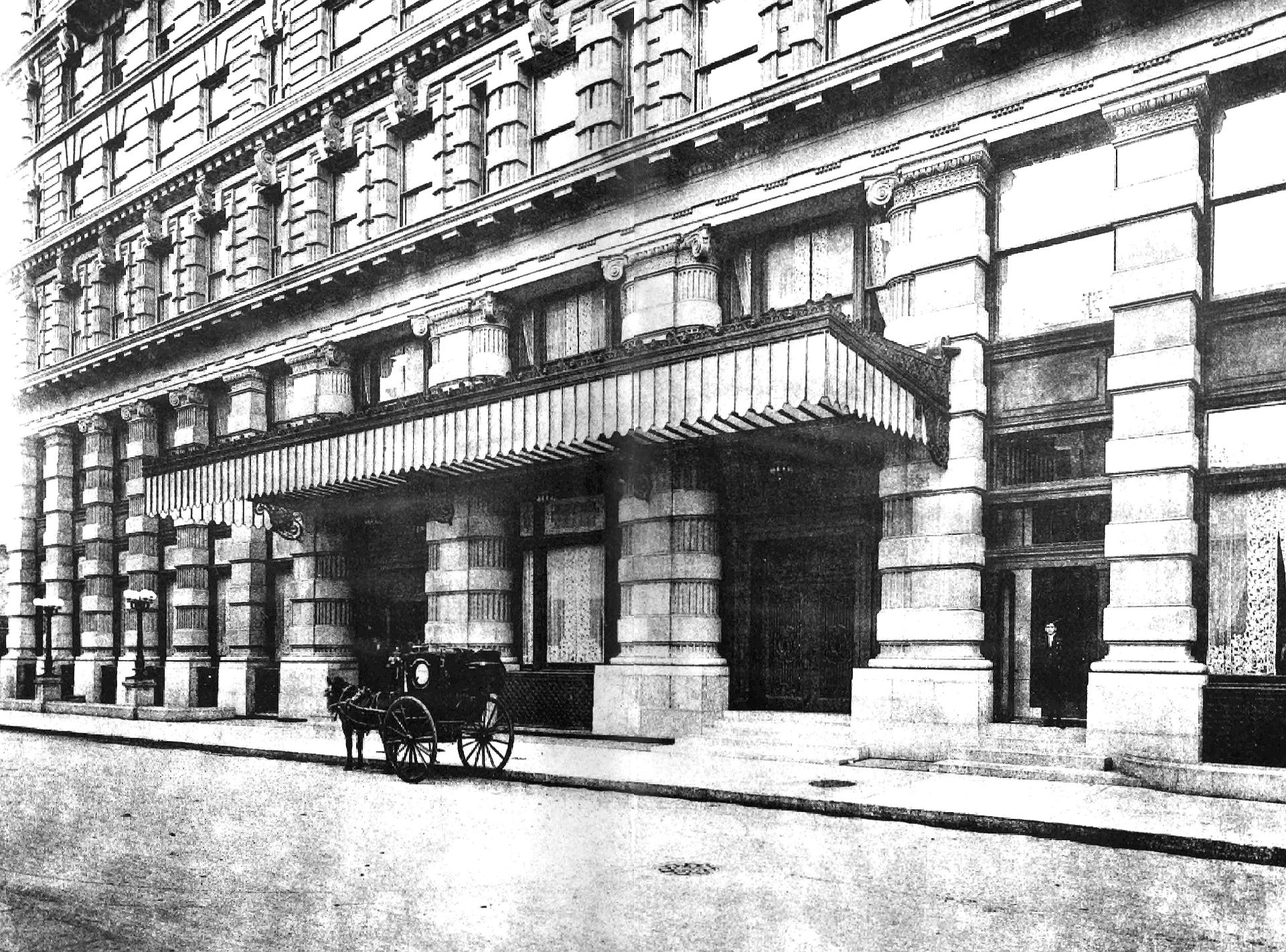
Main entrance of Sherry's in 1899

Sherry's was a restaurant in New York City. It was established by Louis Sherry in 1880 at 38th Street and Sixth Avenue. In the 1890s, it moved to West 37th Street, near Fifth Avenue. By 1898 it had moved to the corner of 44th Street and Fifth Avenue, where it catered to some of New York's more exclusive patrons until it closed in 1919. It reopened in 1921 at 300 Park Avenue, where it operated until 1952.

== History ==
Around 1880, with $1,300 saved from his time at the Hotel Elberon, Sherry launched his first restaurant in New York City at 38th Street and Sixth Avenue. The new establishment struggled a bit at first, but Sherry's knack for "dainty decorations" and the "novelties of service" won a following from "The Four Hundred" (late 19th century term for New York City's social elite, coined by Ward McAllister). In a short time, Sherry upgraded to a larger (and more prestigious) location at 37th Street and Fifth Avenue in 1890. But even that location proved too small, and again the business upgraded to a building owned by Isaac Vail Brokaw at 44th Street and Fifth Avenue in 1898. The building was designed by McKim, Mead & White.

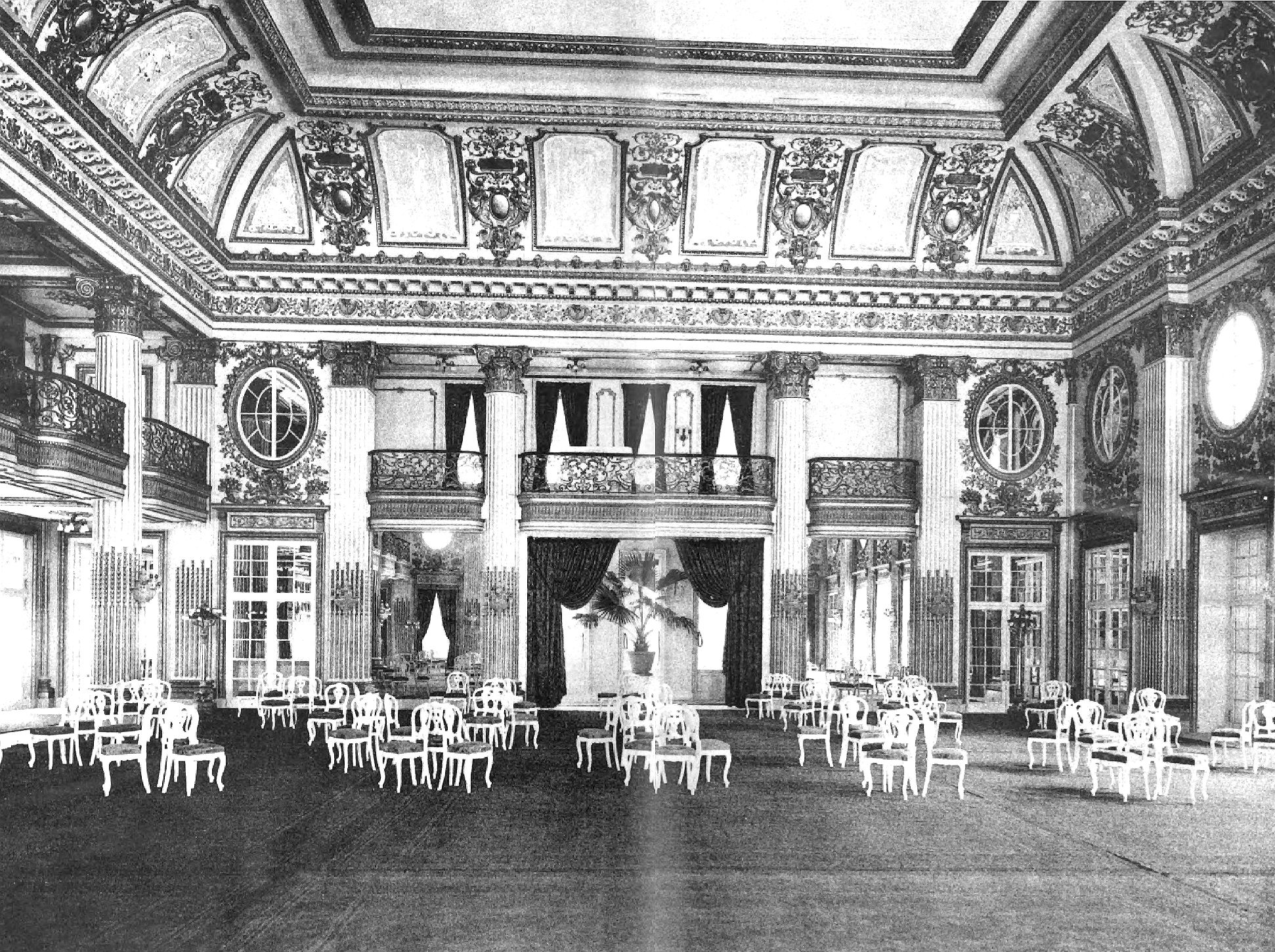
The ballroom at Sherry's, Fifth Avenue and 44th Street, in 1898

The restaurant was the site for a dinner on horseback held by wealthy industrialist Cornelius Kingsley Garrison Billings, who had recently opened a private trotting stable at what is Fort Tryon Park today. Billings intended to have the dinner at the stables, but changed his mind and rented the main ballroom at Louis Sherry's instead. On March 28, 1903, the horses were brought to the fourth floor of the Sherry building by freight elevator into a room fitted with a canvas backdrop to simulate an English country scene. Billings invited 36 guests to dine with him on horseback. Trays for the food were attached to the riding saddles and champagne was able to be sipped from a bottle in one's saddlebag via rubber tubing. The horses were not Billings' own, but had been rented from local riding academies for the dinner; they were fed with troughs.

In 1919, Sherry closed the Fifth Avenue restaurant, blaming Prohibition and what he called "war-born Bolshevism" among waiters. He sold his leasehold on the building, and its contents were sold at auction for $231,000. The building was converted into a banking office for the Guaranty Trust Company.

=== 300 Park Avenue ===
In December 1919, a syndicate of financiers that included T. Coleman du Pont, Benjamin McAlpin and Lucius M. Boomer announced plans for an apartment building on the block of Park Avenue between 49th and 50th Streets, with the Sherry company to operate its restaurant and serve meals in the apartments. The restaurant business, formed by a group that included Sherry, opened there as Louis Sherry's on November 2, 1921. Sherry also ran a confectionery shop, also called Sherry's, at Park Avenue and 50th Street. He died on June 9, 1926, at the Hotel Ambassador.

The restaurant was later operated by Sherry Catering, Inc., which was acquired in 1944 by Harold H. Burns and Martin Sweeney, and in 1950 by a syndicate headed by August Weisbrod, a former banquet manager. Uris Brothers bought the building in about 1951 to replace it with an office building, and Sherry's Restaurant at 300 Park Avenue closed on July 31, 1952. A separate company, Louis Sherry, Inc., which Sherry had formed to make candies, pastries and ice cream, had no corporate connection with Sherry Catering; it was owned from 1950 by the Childs Company.
