= Louis Sherry Inc. =

American confectionery company

Louis Sherry Inc. was an early 20th-century company known for quality confectionery products, particularly candy and ice cream. It was founded by New York restaurateur Louis Sherry and Lucius M. Boomer, then Chairman of the Waldorf-Astoria Hotel. The company was acquired by the Childs Company in 1950, for "more than $2,000,000".
