= 1929 in music =

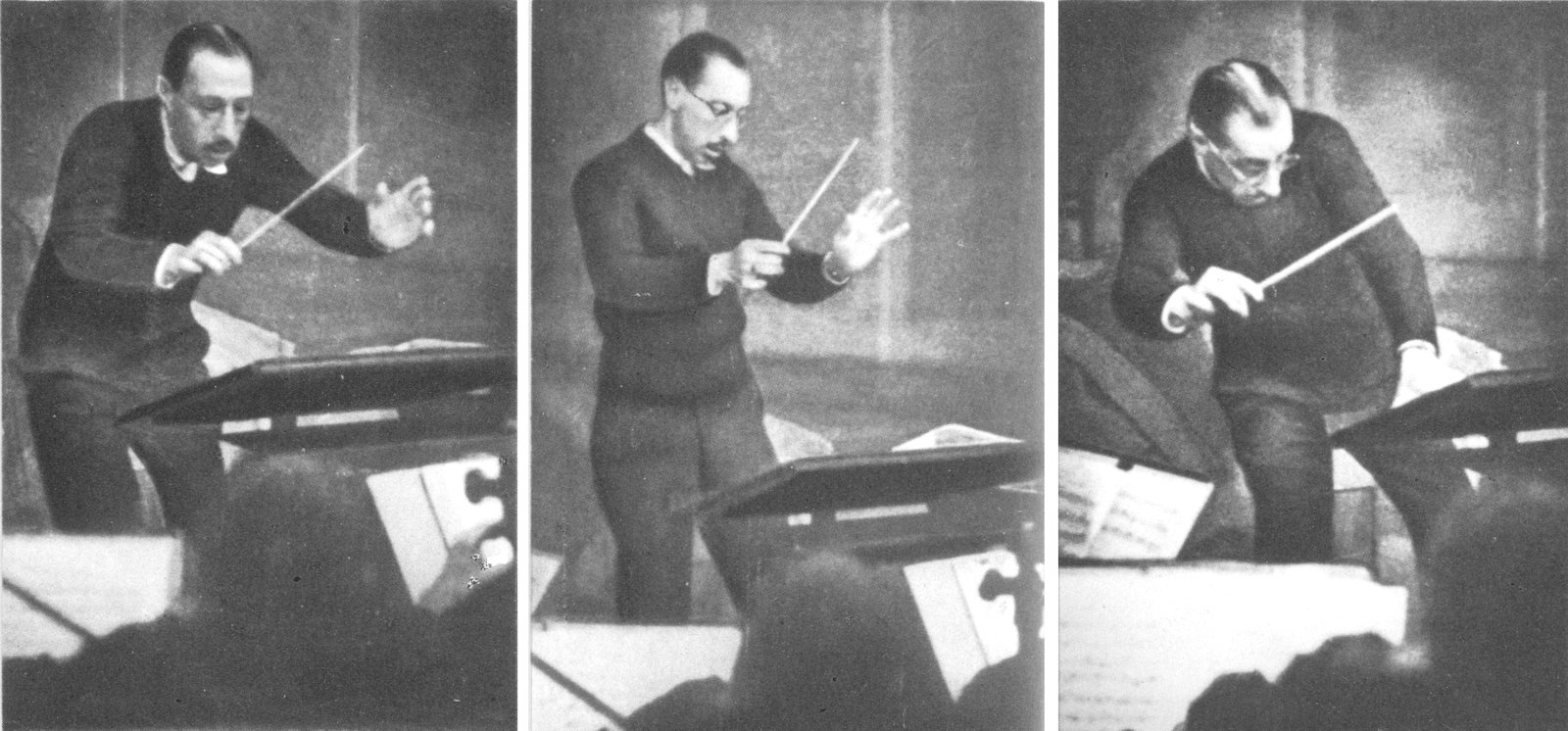
Igor Stravinsky conducting in 1929

This is a list of notable events in music that took place in the year 1929.

== Specific locations ==
- 1929 in British music
- 1929 in Norwegian music

== Specific genres ==
- 1929 in country music
- 1929 in jazz

== Events ==
- January 1 – Pianist and composer Abram Chasins makes his professional debut playing his own piano concerto with the Philadelphia Orchestra.
- January 11 – Karol Szymanowski's Stabat Mater is premiered.
- January 22 – Gordon Jacob's First String Quartet is premiered by the Spencer Dyke Quartet in London.
- February 4 – First recording of George Gershwin's An American in Paris, by Nathaniel Shilkret and the Victor Symphony Orchestra
- February 19 – UK première of Béla Bartók's still-unpublished Third String Quartet, by The Hungarian String Quartet at the Wigmore Hall, London.
- April 10 – Nicholas Laucella joins with Giuseppe De Luca, Giulio Setti and the Metropolitan Opera in a recording of I gioielli della Madonna Serenata for RCA Victor.
- April 29 – Sergei Prokofiev's opera The Gambler premiers in Brussels, based on the story of the same name by Fyodor Dostoevsky.
- May 17 – Sergei Prokofiev's Symphony No. 3 is premiered in Paris.
- May 21
  - Season opening of Sergei Diaghilev's Ballets Russes, in Paris, with the first performances of Igor Stravinsky's Renard and Sergei Prokofiev's Le Fils prodigue.
  - First recording date for a commercially issued RCA Victor 33 1/3 rpm LP: Victor Salon Suite No. 1 arranged and directed by Nathaniel Shilkret
- May 22 – Jimmy Campbell and Reg Connelly establish music publishing house Campbell, Connelly & Co, Ltd.
- June 13 – Eugene Goosens conducts the UK premieres of Igor Stravinsky's Concerto for Piano and Wind Instruments, with the composer as soloist, and of Ottorino Respighi's Feste Romane, at the Queen's Hall, London.
- June 14 – Charley Patton makes the first recording of his career.
- June 27 – First London performances of two ballets by Igor Stravinsky, Apollon musagète and Le Baiser de la fée, conducted by the composer at the Kingsway Hall and broadcast on the wireless.
- September 11 – Louis Armstrong records his hit song "When You're Smiling".
- October 14 – the London Symphony Orchestra opens its winter season, conducted by Alfred Coates, in a programme including Bach's Passacaglia and Fugue in C minor orchestrated by Alexander Goedicke, Respighi's Roman Festivals, Tchaikovsky's First Piano Concerto (with soloist Shura Cherkassky), and Brahms's Fourth Symphony.
- December 31 – Guy Lombardo plays "Auld Lang Syne" for the first time.
- December – Release in the United States of short film The Singing Brakeman starring country singer Jimmie Rodgers.
- The Musashino Academia Musicae is founded in Tokyo, Japan.
- Edison Records closes, ending production of Diamond Discs and Blue Amberols.
- Bessie Smith shoots a short film for "St Louis Blues", which would become her only known film appearance.
- T-Bone Walker's recording career begins with release of the single 78 "Wichita Falls Blues"/"Trinity River Blues," on Columbia Records. This was made in 1929 under the name Oak Cliff T-Bone.
- Memphis Minnie makes the first recordings of her career in 1929 with Columbia Records. These were six shellac record sides recorded with Johnny Shines; the first of which was the song "Bumble Bee".
- Amédé Ardoin makes his first zydeco record in Louisiana in 1929; an event often credited as the first recording made by a Creole musician (although one scholar notes that it is possible but not certain that the Creole fiddle player Douglas Bellard made an earlier recording).

== Published popular music ==
- "Ain't Misbehavin'" w. Andy Razaf m. Thomas "Fats" Waller & Harry Brooks
- "Am I Blue?" w. Grant Clarke m. Harry Akst
- "Any Old Time" w.m. Jimmie Rodgers
- "Around The Corner" w. Gus Kahn m. Art Kassel
- "The Banjo (That Man Joe Plays)" w.m. Cole Porter
- "Barnacle Bill The Sailor" w.m. Carson Robison & Frank Luther
- "Big City Blues" w. Sidney D. Mitchell m. Archie Gottler & Con Conrad
- "Black and Blue" w. Andy Razaf m. Thomas "Fats" Waller
- "Blue, Turning Grey Over You" w. Andy Razaf m. Thomas "Fats" Waller
- "Broadway Melody" w. Arthur Freed m. Nacio Herb Brown
- "Can Broadway Do Without Me?" w.m. Jimmy Durante
- "Can't We Be Friends?" w. Paul James m. Kay Swift
- "Chant Of The Jungle" w. Arthur Freed m. Nacio Herb Brown. Introduced by Joan Crawford in the film Untamed.
- "Corrine, Corrina" w. J. Mayo Williams & Bo Chatman
- "Cross Your Fingers" w. Arthur Swanstrom & Benny Davis m. J. Fred Coots
- "Cryin' For The Carolines" w. Sam M. Lewis & Joe Young m. Harry Warren
- "Daddy Won't You Please Come Home?" w.m. Sam Coslow
- "Dear Little Cafe" w.m. Noël Coward
- "Deep Night" w. Rudy Vallee m. Charlie Henderson
- "Do Something" w. Bud Green m. Sam H. Stept
- "Do What You Do" w. Ira Gershwin & Gus Kahn m. George Gershwin
- "Don't Ever Leave Me" w. Oscar Hammerstein II m. Jerome Kern
- "Dream Lover" w. Clifford Grey m. Victor Schertzinger
- "Every Little Moment" w.m. Vivian Ellis
- "Feeling Sentimental" w. Ira Gershwin m. George Gershwin
- "Find Me A Primitive Man" w.m. Cole Porter
- "Gee Baby, Ain't I Good To You?" w. Andy Razaf & Don Redman m. Don Redman
- "Great Day!" w. Billy Rose & Edward Eliscu m. Vincent Youmans
- "Happy Days Are Here Again" w. Jack Yellen m. Milton Ager
- "Have A Little Faith In Me" w. Sam M. Lewis & Joe Young m. Harry Warren
- "Here Am I" w. Oscar Hammerstein II m. Jerome Kern
- "He's A Good Man To Have Around" w. Jack Yellen m. Milton Ager
- "He's So Unusual" w.m. Al Sherman, Al Lewis and Abner Silver
- "High And Low" w. Howard Dietz m. Arthur Schwartz
- "Honeysuckle Rose" w. Andy Razaf m. Thomas "Fats" Waller
- "How Am I To Know?" w. Dorothy Parker m. Jack King
- "I Got A Code In My Dose" w.m. Arthur Fields, Fred Hall & Billy Rose
- "I Guess I'll Have To Change My Plan" w. Howard Dietz m. Arthur Schwartz. Introduced by Clifton Webb in the revue The Little Show
- "I Have To Have You" Leo Robin, Richard A. Whiting
- "I Lift Up My Finger" w.m. Leslie Sarony
- "I May Be Wrong" w. Harry Ruskin m. Henry Sullivan. Introduced in the revue John Murray Anderson's Almanac by Trixie Friganza and Jimmie Savo.
- "If I Can't Have You" w. Al Bryan m. George W. Meyer
- "If I Had A Talking Picture Of You" w. B. G. De Sylva & Lew Brown m. Ray Henderson
- "If Love Were All" w.m. Noël Coward
- "I'll Always Be In Love With You" w. Herman Ruby, Bud Green, & Sam H. Stept m. Sam H. Stept
- "I'll See You Again" w.m. Noël Coward
- "I'll Still Go On Wanting You" w.m. Bernie Grossman
- "I'm A Dreamer, Aren't We All?" w. B. G. De Sylva & Lew Brown m. Ray Henderson
- "I'm A Gigolo" w.m. Cole Porter
- "I'm In Seventh Heaven" w.m. Al Jolson, B. G. De Sylva, Lew Brown & Ray Henderson
- "I'm Just a Vagabond Lover" w.m. Rudy Vallee & Leon Zimmerman
- "I've Got a Feeling I'm Falling" w. Billy Rose m. Fats Waller & Harry Link
- "Just You, Just Me" w. Raymond Klages m. Jesse Greer. Introduced in the film Marianne by Lawrence Gray and reprised by Marion Davies and Cliff Edwards.
- "Kansas City Kitty" w. Edgar Leslie m. Walter Donaldson
- "Lady Divine" w.m. Nathaniel Shilkret and Richard Kountz
- "Let Me Sing and I'm Happy" w.m. Irving Berlin
- "Little by Little" w.m. Walter O'Keefe & Robert Emmet Dolan. Introduced by Sally O'Neil and Eddie Quillan in the film The Sophomore
- "The Little Things You Do" w. Lorenz Hart m. Richard Rodgers
- "Liza" w. Gus Kahn & Ira Gershwin m. George Gershwin. Introduced by Nick Lucas in the musical Show Girl
- "Looking at You" w.m. Cole Porter. Introduced by Jessie Matthews and Dave Fitzgibbon in the musical Wake Up and Dream
- "Louise" w. Leo Robin m. Richard A. Whiting. Introduced by Maurice Chevalier in the film Innocents of Paris
- "Lovable and Sweet" w. Sidney Clare m. Oscar Levant. Introduced by Jack Oakie, John Harron and Ned Sparks in the film Street Girl
- "Love, Your Magic Spell Is Everywhere" w. Elsie Janis m. Edmund Goulding
- "March of the Grenadiers" w. Clifford Grey m. Victor Schertzinger Introduced by Jeanette MacDonald in the film The Love Parade
- "Maybe Who Knows" John Tucker, Joe Schuster, Ruth Etting
- "Mean to Me" w. Roy Turk m. Fred E. Ahlert
- "The Minor Drag" m. Thomas "Fats" Waller
- "Moanin' Low" w. Howard Dietz m. Ralph Rainger. Introduced by Libby Holman in the revue The Little Show
- "More Than You Know" w. Edward Eliscu & Billy Rose m. Vincent Youmans. Introduced by Mayo Methot in the musical Great Day
- "My Ideal" w. Leo Robin m. Richard A. Whiting & Newell Chase. Introduced by Maurice Chevalier in the film Playboy of Paris
- "My Kinda Love" w. Jo Trent m. Louis Alter
- "My Love Parade" w. Clifford Grey m. Victor Schertzinger
- "My Mother's Eyes" w. L. Wolfe Gilbert m. Abel Baer
- "My Sin" w. B. G. De Sylva & Lew Brown m. Ray Henderson
- "Painting the Clouds with Sunshine" w. Al Dubin m. Joe Burke. Introduced by Nick Lucas in the film Gold Diggers of Broadway.
- "Paris, Stay the Same" w. Clifford Grey m. Victor Schertzinger
- "Piccolo Pete" w.m. Phil Baxter
- "Puttin' on the Ritz" w.m. Irving Berlin
- "Raisin' the Roof" w. Dorothy Fields m. Jimmy McHugh
- "Reaching For Someone" w. Edgar Leslie m. Walter Donaldson
- "Rock Island Line" w.m. Clarence Wilson (written)
- "Rockin' Chair" w.m. Hoagy Carmichael
- "Romance" w. Edgar Leslie m. Walter Donaldson
- "Satisfied!" w. Irving Caesar m. Cliff Friend
- "Serenade of Love" by Irving Caesar
- "Seventh Heaven" w. Sidney D. Mitchell m. Lew Pollack
- "She's Such A Comfort To Me" w. Douglas Furber, Max Lief, Nathaniel Lief & Donovan Parsons m. Arthur Schwartz
- "She's Wonderful" w. Gus Kahn m. Walter Donaldson
- "A Ship Without A Sail" w. Lorenz Hart m. Richard Rodgers. Introduced by Jack Whiting in the musical Heads Up!. Performed in the film version by Charles "Buddy" Rogers.
- "Should I?" w. Arthur Freed m. Nacio Herb Brown
- "Canto Siboney" w. Dolly Morse m. Ernesto Lecuona
- "Singin' in the Bathtub" w. Herb Magidson & Ned Washington m. Michael H. Cleary
- "Singin' in the Rain" w. Arthur Freed m. Nacio Herb Brown
- "So The Bluebirds and the Blackbirds Got Together" w. Billy Moll m. Harry Barris
- "Spread A Little Happiness" w.m. Vivian Ellis, Richard Myers & Greatrex Newman
- "Star Dust" w. Mitchell Parish m. Hoagy Carmichael Music 1927.
- "Sunny Side Up" w. B. G. De Sylva & Lew Brown m. Ray Henderson
- "Too Wonderful For Words" w.m. Dave Stamper
- "Thank Your Father" w. B. G. De Sylva & Lew Brown m. Ray Henderson
- "Thinking of You" w. Bert Kalmar m. Harry Ruby
- "True Blue Lou" w.m. Sam Coslow, Leo Robin & Richard A. Whiting
- "Turn on the Heat" w. B. G. DeSylva & Lew Brown m. Ray Henderson. Introduced by Sharon Lynn and Frank Richardson in the film Sunny Side Up
- "Wait 'Til You See Ma Cherie" w. Leo Robin m. Richard A. Whiting
- "Waiting At The End Of The Road" w.m. Irving Berlin
- "Wake Up And Dream" w.m. Cole Porter
- "Walk Right In" Cannon, Woods, Darling, Suanoe
- "Wedding Bells Are Breaking Up That Old Gang Of Mine" w. Irving Kahal & Willie Raskin m. Sammy Fain
- "The Wedding Of The Painted Doll" w. Arthur Freed m. Nacio Herb Brown
- "Weary River" w. Grant Clarke m. Louis Silvers. Introduced by Johnny Murray in the film Weary River
- "What Is This Thing Called Love?" w.m. Cole Porter. Introduced by Elsie Carlisle in the musical Wake Up and Dream
- "Why Can't I?" w. Lorenz Hart m. Richard Rodgers
- "Why Do You Suppose?" w. Lorenz Hart m. Richard Rodgers
- "Why Was I Born?" w. Oscar Hammerstein II m. Jerome Kern
- "With A Song in My Heart" w. Lorenz Hart m. Richard Rodgers
- "Without A Song" w. Edward Eliscu & Billy Rose m. Vincent Youmans
- "You Do Something To Me" w.m. Cole Porter. Introduced by William Gaxton in the musical Fifty Million Frenchmen
- "You Were Meant For Me" w. Arthur Freed m. Nacio Herb Brown
- "Yours Sincerely" w. Lorenz Hart m. Richard Rodgers
- "You've Got That Thing" w.m. Cole Porter
- "Zigeuner" w.m. Noël Coward

== Top popular recordings 1929 ==
The following songs achieved the highest positions in Joel Whitburn's Pop Memories 1890-1954 and record sales reported on the "Discography of American Historical Recordings" website during 1929: Numerical rankings are approximate, they are only used as a frame of reference.

Rank	Artist	Title	Label	Recorded	Released	Chart positions
1	Nick Lucas	"Tip Toe Through the Tulips"	Brunswick 4418	May 9, 1929	September 1929	US BB 1929 #1, US #1 for 10 weeks, 19 total weeks
2	Rudy Vallee and His Connecticut Yankees	Honey"	Victor 21869	February 7, 1929	March 1929	US BB 1929 #2, US #1 for 8 weeks, 15 total weeks
3	Gene Austin	Carolina Moon"	Victor 21833	December 10, 1928	February 1929	US BB 1929 #3, US #1 for 7 weeks, 14 total weeks
4	Al Jolson	"Little Pal"	Brunswick 4400	April 7, 1929	July 1929	US BB 1929 #4, US #1 for 5 weeks, 10 total weeks
5	Leo Reisman and His Orchestra	"The Wedding of the Painted Doll"	Columbia 1780	March 11, 1929	May 1929	US BB 1929 #5, US #1 for 4 weeks, 12 total weeks
6	Copley Plaza Orchestra (Bob Haring Orchestra)	"Pagan Love Song"	Brunswick 4321	March 29, 1929	June 1929	US BB 1929 #6, US #1 for 4 weeks, 11 total weeks
7	Cliff Edwards	"Singin' In The Rain"	Columbia 1869	May 28, 1929	July 1929	US BB 1929 #7, US #1 for 3 weeks, 12 total weeks
8	Guy Lombardo and His Royal Canadians	"Sweethearts On Parade"	Columbia 1628	November 10, 1928	December 1928	US BB 1929 #8, US #1 for 3 weeks, 12 total weeks
9	Ethel Waters	"Am I Blue?"	Columbia 1837	May 14, 1929	June 1929	US BB 1929 #9, US #1 for 2 weeks, 15 total weeks, Grammy Hall of Fame 2007
10	George Olsen and His Music	"A Precious Little Thing Called Love"	Victor 21832	October 3, 1928	March 1929	US BB 1929 #10, US #1 for 2 weeks, 11 total weeks
11	Paul Whiteman and His Orchestra	"Great Day"	Columbia 2023	October 9, 1929	December 1929	US BB 1929 #11, US #1 for 2 weeks, 9 total weeks
12	Nick Lucas	"Painting the Clouds with Sunshine"	Brunswick 4418	May 9, 1929	September 1929	US BB 1929 #12, US #2 for 5 weeks, 15 total weeks
13	Ted Weems and His Orchestra	"Piccolo Pete"	Victor 22037	June 28, 1929	September 1929	US BB 1929 #13, US #2 for 4 weeks, 15 total weeks
14	Rudy Vallee and His Connecticut Yankees	"Weary River"	Victor 21868	February 6, 1929	April 1, 1929	US BB 1929 #14, US #2 for 4 weeks, 10 total weeks
15	Nat Shilkret and the Victor Orchestra (vocal Burt Lorin aka Scrappy Lambert)	"You Were Meant for Me"	Victor 21886	February 15, 1929	April 1929	US BB 1929 #15, US #2 for 2 weeks, 12 total weeks
16	Helen Kane	"I Wanna Be Loved by You"	Victor 21684	September 20, 1928	December 1928	US BB 1928 #16, US #2 for 2 weeks, 11 total weeks
17	Ruth Etting	"Love Me or Leave Me"	Columbia 1680	December 17, 1928	January 1929	US BB 1929 #16, US #2 for 2 weeks, 11 total weeks
18	Eddie Cantor	"Makin' Whoopee"	Victor 21831	December 18, 1928	February 1929	US BB 1929 #17, US #2 for 2 weeks, 10 total weeks
19	Jimmie Rodgers and the Three Southerners	"The Sailor's Plea" / I'm Lonely and Blue	Victor 40054	February 14, 1928	April 19, 1929	236,231 sales
20	George Olsen and His Music / The Troubadours	"Sonny Boy" / Beggars of Life	Victor 21683	September 18, 1928	December 1928	219,029 sales
21	Gene Austin	"A Garden in the Rain"	Victor 21915	March 13, 1929	May 3, 1929	US BB 1929 #173, US #15 for 1 week, 2 total weeks, 84,063 sales
22	Gene Austin	"Little Pal"	Victor 21952	April 3, 1929	September 1929	US BB 1929 #70, US #7 for 1 weeks 5 total weeks, 63,438 sales
23	Leo Reisman and His Orchestra	"I Kiss Your Hand, Madame"	Victor 21920	April 1, 1929	July 1929	US BB 1929 #154, US #13 for 1 week, 3 total weeks, 44,431 sales
24	Rudy Vallee and His Connecticut Yankees	"Deep Night"	Victor 21868	February 6, 1929	April 1929	US BB 1929 #18, US #2 for 2 weeks, 10 total weeks
25	Gus Arnheim Coconut Grove Orchestra	"Sleepy Valley"	Victor 21986	April 17, 1929	July 1929	US BB 1929 #19, US #2 for 2 weeks, 9 total weeks
26	The Carter Family	"Wildwood Flower"	Victor 40000	May 10, 1928	January 10, 1929	US BB 1929 #30, US #3 for 1 weeks 10 total weeks, Hillbilly 1929 #1, 1,000,000 sales, National Recording Registry 2006

=== 1929 Harlem Hit Parade + Blues ===
(created with Popular Music Chart Entries and Blues records)

#	Artist	Title	Label	Recording date	Release date	Chart positions
1	Louis Armstrong and His Orchestra	"Ain't Misbehavin'"	Okeh 8714	July 19, 1929	August 5, 1929	US BB 1929 #75, US #7 for 1 week, 4 total weeks
2	Pine Top Smith	"Pine Top's Boogie Woogie"	Vocalion 1245	December 29, 1928	March 1929	US BB 1929 #246, US #20 for 1 week, 1 total weeks, Grammy Hall of Fame 1983
3	Bennie Moten's Kansas City Orchestra	"South"	Victor 38021	September 7, 1928	August 1929	US BB 1929 #115, US #10 for 1 week, 4 total weeks
4	Louis Armstrong and His Savoy Ballroom Five	"St. James Infirmary"	Okeh 8657	December 12, 1928	February 1929	US BB 1929 #172, US #15 for 1 week, 3 total weeks
5	Louis Armstrong and His Orchestra	"When You're Smiling"	Okeh 8729	September 11, 1929	October 25, 1929	US BB 1929 #175, US #15 for 1 week, 2 total weeks
6	Bessie Smith	"Nobody Knows You When You're Down and Out"	Columbia 14451	May 15, 1929	September 13, 1929	US BB 1929 #184, US #15 for 1 week, 2 total weeks
7	Duke Ellington & His Orch	"The Mooche"	Okeh 8623	October 1, 1928	November 5, 1928	US BB 1929 #192, US #16 for 1 week, 2 total weeks
8	Fats Waller	"Ain't Misbehavin'"	Victor 22108	August 2, 1929	November 8, 1929	US BB 1929 #206, US #17 for 1 week, 1 total week, National Recording Registry 2004
9	Blind Willie McTell	"Statesboro Blues"	Victor 38001	October 17, 1928	January 4, 1929	Hillbilly 1929 #9, National Recording Registry 2015
10	Charlie McCoy and Bo Chatman	"Corrine, Corrina"	Brunswick 7080	December 1, 1928	August 1929	
11	Blind Willie Dunn (Eddie Lang) & Lonnie Johnson	"Hot Fingers"	Okeh 8743	October 9, 1929	December 1929	
12	Charley Patton	"Pony Blues"	Paramount 12792	June 14, 1929	July 1929	Grammy Hall of Fame 1999, National Recording Registry 2006
13	Mississippi John Hurt	"Stack O' Lee Blues"	Okeh 8654	December 28, 1928	May 1929	
14	Elder J. J. Hadley (Charley Patton)	"Prayer Of Death"	Paramount 12799	June 14, 1929	August 1929	
15	Blind Sammie (Blind Willie McTell)	"Travelin' Blues"	Columbia 14484D	October 30, 1929	November 1929	
16	Blind Blake	"Police Dog Blues"	Paramount 12888	August 17, 1929	November 1929	

== Classical music ==
- Kurt Atterberg – Symphonic Poem Älven, Op. 33
- Béla Bartók
  - Rhapsody No. 1, for violin and orchestra
  - Twenty Hungarian Folksongs, for voice and piano
- Arnold Bax
  - Symphony No. 3
  - Sonata for Two Pianos
  - Legend, for Viola and Piano
- Amy Beach – String Quartet, Op. 89
- Conrad Beck – Concerto for String Quartet and Orchestra
- Boris Blacher – Jazz Koloraturen
- Ernest Bloch
  - Helvetia (Symphonic Poem)
  - Abodah for Violin
- Benjamin Britten – Rhapsody for String Quartet
- Alan Bush – Dialectic Op. 15 for String Quartet
- Carlos Chávez – Sonata for four horns
- Aaron Copland – Symphonic Ode
- Henry Cowell – Piano Concerto
- Cornelis Dopper – Incidental Music to Vondel's Lucifer
- Pierre-Octave Ferroud – Violin Sonata
- Alexander Gretchaninov – String Quartet No. 4 in F Op. 124
- Roy Harris
  - American Portraits, for orchestra
  - String Quartet No. 1
- Paul Juon – Litaniae for Piano, Violin and Cello in C sharp minor
- Wilhelm Kempff – Symphony No. 2
- Ernst Krenek
  - Reisebuch aus den österreichischen Alpen, op. 62
  - Triophantasie, op. 63
- Igor Markevitch
  - Sinfonietta in F
  - Piano Concerto
- Bohuslav Martinů
  - String Quartet No. 3 H.183
  - Violin Sonata No. 1 H.355
- Olivier Messiaen – Diptyque pour orgue
- Darius Milhaud – Concerto No. 1 for Viola and Orchestra, Op. 108
- Ildebrando Pizzetti – Rondo Veneziano
- Francis Poulenc – Aubade
- Sergei Prokofiev – Prodigal Son, op. 46 (1928–29, ballet)
- Silvestre Revueltas – Pieza para Orquesta
- Julius Röntgen – Piano Concerto in E major
- Albert Roussel
  - Petite Suite, op. 39, for orchestra
  - Prelude and Fughetta, op. 41, for organ
  - Trio, for flute, viola and cello, op. 40
- Arnold Schoenberg – Piano Piece Op. 33a
- Dmitri Shostakovich – Symphony No. 3 E flat major, Op. 20
- Jean Sibelius – 5 Esquisses, Op. 114, for piano
- Igor Stravinsky
  - Capriccio, for piano and orchestra
  - Berceuse, for violin and piano (arr. from ballet The Firebird)
- Ernst Toch
  - Bunte Suite, Op. 48
  - Cello Sonata, Op. 50
  - Kleine Ouvertüre zu der Fächer (Little Overture to the (opera the) Fan), Op. 51
- Joaquín Turina
  - Recuerdos de la antigua España, Op. 48, for piano
  - Violin Sonata No. 1, Op. 51
  - Miniaturas, Op. 52, for piano
  - Ráfaga, Op. 53, for guitar
- Heitor Villa-Lobos
  - Chôros No. 9 for orchestra
  - Chôros No. 12 for orchestra
  - Chôros No. 13 for 2 orchestras & band
  - Introdução aos Chôros (Introduction to the Chôros), for guitar and orchestra
  - Chôros bis, for violin and cello
  - Mômo Precoce, fantasy for piano and orchestra
  - 12 Etudes for guitar
- William Walton – Viola Concerto
- Egon Wellesz – String Quartet No. 4 Op. 28

== Opera ==
- Marc Blitzstein – Triple-Sec (Philadelphia, May 9)
- Hans Chemin-Petit – Der gefangene Vogel (Duisburg, February 21)
- Umberto Giordano – Il re (La Scala, January 12)
- Paul Hindemith – Neues vom Tage (Kroll Opera House, Berlin, June 8)
- Sergei Prokofiev – The Gambler (La Monnaie, Brussels, April 29)
- Arnold Schoenberg – Von heute auf morgen (completed January 1, 1929; first performance February 1, 1930)
- Tito Schipa – La Principessa Liana (Teatro Adriano, Rome, June 22)
- Ralph Vaughan Williams – Sir John in Love (Royal College of Music, London, March 21)

== Film ==
- Dmitri Shostakovich – The New Babylon

== Musical theater ==
- Bitter Sweet (Noël Coward)
  - London production opened at His Majesty's Theatre on July 12 and ran for 673 performances
  - Broadway production opened at the Ziegfeld Theatre on November 5 and transferred to the Shubert Theatre on February 17, 1930, for a total run of 159 performances
- Boom Boom Broadway production opened at the Casino Theatre on January 28 and ran for 72 performances
- Dear Love opened at the Palace Theatre on November 14 and ran for 132 performances
- Die Dreigroschenoper Vienna production
- Fifty Million Frenchmen Broadway production opened at the Lyric Theatre on November 27 and ran for 254 performances
- Follow Thru Broadway production opened at the 46th Street Theatre on January 9 and ran for 401 performances
- Follow Through London production opened at the Dominion Theatre on October 3 and ran for 148 performances
- Heads Up! Broadway production opened at the Alvin Theatre on November 11 and ran for 144 performances
- Hold Everything London production opened at the Palace Theatre on June 12 and ran for 173 performances
- Hot Chocolates Broadway revue opened at the Hudson Theatre on June 20 and ran for 219 performances
- The House That Jack Built London revue opened at the Adelphi Theatre on November 8 and ran for 270 performances
- Das Land des Lächelns (Franz Lehár) – Berlin production opened at the Metropol Theater on October 10
- The Little Show Broadway revue opened at the Music Box Theatre on April 30 and ran for 321 performances
- Love Lies London production opened at the Gaiety Theatre on March 20 and ran for 347 performances
- Mr. Cinders London production opened at the Adelphi Theatre on February 11 and ran for 528 performances
- Show Boat (Jerome Kern and Oscar Hammerstein II) – Paris production
- Spring Is Here (Music: Richard Rodgers Lyrics: Lorenz Hart Book: Owen Davis) Broadway production opened at the Alvin Theatre on March 11 and ran for 104 performances
- Toad of Toad Hall London production opened at the Lyric Theatre on December 17
- Top Speed Broadway production opened at Chanin's 46th Street Theatre on December 25 and transferred to the Royale Theatre on March 10, 1930, for a total run of 104 performances
- Wake Up and Dream (Music and Lyrics: Cole Porter)
  - London revue opened at the Pavilion on March 27 and ran for 263 performances
  - Broadway revue opened at the Selwyn Theatre on December 30 and ran for 136 performances

== Musical films ==
- Applause starring Helen Morgan. Directed by Rouben Mamoulian.
- The Battle of Paris starring Gertrude Lawrence, Charles Ruggles, Walter Petrie, Gladys DuBois and Arthur Treacher. Directed by Robert Flory.
- Broadway starring Glenn Tryon, Merna Kennedy, Evelyn Brent and Otis Harlan. Directed by Paul Fejos.
- The Broadway Melody
- The Cocoanuts
- The Desert Song starring John Boles, Carlotta King, Louise Fazenda and Myrna Loy. Directed by Roy Del Ruth.
- Glad Rag Doll
- Glorifying the American Girl starring Mary Eaton and Dan Healy and featuring Eddie Cantor, Helen Morgan and Rudy Vallee.
- Gold Diggers of Broadway
- Happy Days starring Charles E. Evans and Marjorie White and featuring Janet Gaynor and Charles Farrell
- Hollywood Revue of 1929
- Honky Tonk starring Sophie Tucker
- Hot for Paris starring Victor McLaglen, Fifi D'Orsay and El Brendel. Directed by Raoul Walsh.
- The Love Parade starring Maurice Chevalier, Jeanette MacDonald, Lupino Lane and Lillian Roth
- Marianne starring Marion Davies, Lawrence Gray and Cliff Edwards
- On with the Show! starring Arthur Lake, Betty Compson and Joe E. Brown, and featuring Ethel Waters
- Paris released November 7 starring Irène Bordoni, Jack Buchanan and Zasu Pitts.
- Pointed Heels starring William Powell, Helen Kane and Fay Wray. Directed by A. Edward Sutherland.
- Rio Rita starring Bebe Daniels and John Boles
- Sally starring Marilyn Miller, Alexander Gray and Joe E. Brown
- Show Boat
- So Long Letty starring Charlotte Greenwood
- Song of Love starring Belle Baker, Ralph Graves and Eunice Quedens
- Sunny Side Up starring Janet Gaynor, Charles Farrell and Marjorie White
- Tanned Legs starring Ann Pennington, June Clyde, Arthur Lake, Dorothy Revier and Sally Blane. Directed by Marshall Neilan.
- The Vagabond Lover starring Rudy Vallee, Sally Blane and Marie Dressler. Directed by Marshall Neilan.
- Why Leave Home? starring Sue Carol, Nick Stuart, Dixie Lee and Ilka Chase. Directed by Raymond Cannon.
- Words and Music starring Lois Moran, Helen Twelvetrees and Tom Patricola. Directed by James Tinling.

== Births ==
- January 3 – Ernst Mahle, Brazilian composer and conductor
- January 6 – Wilbert Harrison, American singer (died 1994)
- January 15
  - Lord Woodbine (Harold Adolphus Phillips), Trinidadian calypsonian (died 2000)
  - Queen Ida, Louisiana Creole accordionist
- January 22 – Petr Eben, Czech composer (died 2007)
- January 25 – Violeta Hemsy de Gainza, Argentine pianist and music teacher (died 2023)
- January 28 – Mr Acker Bilk, English jazz clarinetist (died 2014)
- February 4 – Stanley Drucker, American clarinetist (died 2022)
- February 10 – Jerry Goldsmith, composer for film and television (died 2004)
- March 4 – Bernard Haitink, violinist and conductor (died 2021)
- March 8 – Ardis Krainik, operatic mezzo-soprano and general director of the Lyric Opera of Chicago (died 1997)
- March 25 – Cecil Taylor, free jazz pianist (died 2018)
- March 26 – Charles Dumont, singer-songwriter (died 2024)
- April 1 – Jane Powell, singer and actress (died 2021)
- April 5 – Joe Meek, UK record producer (died 1967)
- April 6 – André Previn, pianist and conductor (died 2019)
- April 8 – Jacques Brel, Belgian singer-songwriter (died 1978)
- April 16 – Roy Hamilton, American singer (died 1969)
- April 17 – James Last, German bandleader (died 2015)
- April 29
  - Halina Łukomska, soprano (died 2016)
  - Peter Sculthorpe, composer (died 2014)
  - April Stevens, singer (died 2023)
- May 1 – Sonny James, country singer-songwriter (died 2016)
- May 2 – Link Wray, American guitarist (died 2005)
- May 3 – Denise Lor, singer (died 2015)
- May 11 – Fernand Lindsay, Canadian organist and educator (died 2009)
- May 16 – Betty Carter, jazz singer (died 1998)
- May 25 – Beverly Sills, operatic soprano (died 2007)
- June 9 – Johnny Ace, R&B singer (died 1954)
- June 23 – June Carter Cash, singer-songwriter, wife of Johnny Cash (died 2003)
- June 26
  - June Bronhill, operatic soprano (died 2005)
  - Josima Feldschuh, Polish pianist and composer of Jewish origin (died 1943)
- June 27 – Jarmila Šuláková, folk singer (died 2017)
- June 30 – Othmar Mága, German conductor (died 2020)
- July 3 – Pedro Iturralde, composer (died 2020)
- July 9
  - Lee Hazlewood, American singer-songwriter and record producer (died 2007)
  - Jesse McReynolds, American singer and mandolin player (Jim & Jesse)
- July 15
  - Charles Anthony, American tenor (died 2012)
  - Francis Bebey, Cameroonian-French guitarist (died 2001)
- July 18 – Screamin' Jay Hawkins, singer (died 2000)
- August 4 – Vellore G. Ramabhadran, Mridangam performer from Tamil Nadu, India (died 2012)
- August 12 – Buck Owens, singer and guitarist (died 2006)
- August 16 – Bill Evans, jazz pianist (died 1980)
- August 21 – William Bradley Strickland, composer and music educator (died 1990)
- August 24 – William Winfield, doo-wop singer (The Harptones)
- September 8 – Christoph von Dohnányi, conductor (died 2025)
- September 13 – Nicolai Ghiaurov, operatic bass (died 2004)
- September 28 – Lata Mangeshkar, playback singer (died 2022)
- October 2 – Kenneth Leighton, composer (died 1998)
- October 12 – Nappy Brown, blues singer (died 2008)
- October 24 – George Crumb, composer (died 2022)
- October 26 – Neal Matthews Jr., (The Jordanaires) (died 2000)
- November 7 – Benny Andersen, Danish author, poet and pianist (died 2018)
- November 8 – Bert Berns, songwriter record producer (died 1967)
- November 10 – Marilyn Bergman, songwriter (died 2022)
- November 11 – LaVern Baker, R&B singer (died 1997)
- November 12 – Toshiko Akiyoshi, jazz pianist
- November 15 – Joe Hinton, American soul singer (died 1968)
- November 18 – Gianna D'Angelo, American soprano and educator (died 2013)
- November 24 – Eileen Barton, singer (died 2006)
- November 26 – Slavko Avsenik, composer, musician and accordionist (died 2015)
- November 28 – Berry Gordy Jr., record producer, founder of the Tamla Motown label
- November 30 – Dick Clark, host of American Bandstand (died 2012)
- December 4 – Wilhelm Georg Berger, composer (died 1993)
- December 6 – Nikolaus Harnoncourt, conductor (died 2016)
- December 23 – Chet Baker, jazz trumpeter and singer (died 1988)
- December 25
  - Bill Horton, doo-wop singer (The Silhouettes) (died 1995)
  - Chris Kenner, R&B singer-songwriter (died 1976)
- December 26 – Régine Zylberberg, discothèque pioneer (died 2022)
- December 27 – Gyula Kovács, Hungarian drummer (died 1992)

== Deaths ==
- January 11 – Elfrida Andrée, organist, composer and conductor (born 1841)
- January 22 – Adolph Brodsky, violinist (born 1851)
- January 24 – Jacques Bouhy, baritone opera singer (born 1848)
- January 30 – La Goulue, can-can dancer (born 1866)
- February 24 – André Messager, conductor and composer (born 1853)
- March 15 – Pinetop Smith, jazz pianist (born 1904) (shot, during a fight in a dance hall)
- April 3 – Sophus Hagen, composer and music publisher (born 1842)
- April 4 – Édouard Schuré, poet and music critic (born 1841)
- April 12 – Harry Liston, music hall performer and composer (born 1843)
- April 15 – Antonio Smareglia, opera composer (born 1854)
- April 30 – Birger Sjöberg, poet and songwriter (born 1885)
- May 17 – Lilli Lehmann, operatic soprano (born 1848)
- June 2 – Don Murray, jazz clarinettist (born 1894) (car accident)
- June 4 – Harry Frazee, producer of Broadway musicals (born 1881)
- July 3 – Dustin Farnum, singer, dancer and actor (born 1874)
- August 3 – Emile Berliner, inventor of the gramophone (born 1851)
- August 19
  - Sergei Diaghilev, ballet impresario (born 1872)
  - Chris Kelly, jazz musician (born c. 1890)
  - Meta Seinemeyer, operatic soprano (born 1894)
- August 22 – Lucy Broadwood, folk song collector and researcher (born 1858)
- September 4 – Frederick Freeman Proctor, vaudeville impresario (born 1851)
- September 7 – Frederic Weatherly, songwriter (born 1848)
- October 3 – Jeanne Eagels, Ziegfeld girl and actress (born 1894)
- October 6 – Mikhail Ivanovich Mikhaylov, operatic tenor (born 1858)
- October 14 – Henri Berger, composer and royal bandmaster of Hawaii (born 1844)
- October 17 – Ada Crossley, singer (born 1874)
- October 26 – Swan Hennessy, composer (born 1866)
- October 27 – Alfred Maria Willner, composer and librettist (born 1859)
- December 19 – Blind Lemon Jefferson, blues musician (born 1893)
- December 28 – Hans Kreissig, pianist and conductor (born 1856)
- date unknown
  - Antonio Chacón, flamenco singer (born 1869)
  - Carl Herman Unthan, disabled violinist (born 1848)
