= The Song Is You =

1932 song by Jerome Kern and Oscar Hammerstein II

Single by Jack Denny and His Waldorf-Astoria Orchestra
- A-side: "I've Told Ev'ry Little Star"
- Published: 1932
- Released: December 1932
- Recorded: November 11, 1932
- Genre: Traditional pop
- Length: 3:18
- Label: Victor
- Composer: Jerome Kern
- Lyricist: Oscar Hammerstein II

"The Song Is You" is a jazz standard composed by Jerome Kern with lyrics by Oscar Hammerstein II. It was written for their musical Music in the Air (1932) and sung in that show by Tullio Carminati. In the subsequent 1934 film, the song was recorded and filmed but cut from the final release. An instrumental of the song can still be heard under the opening credits.

An early hit in 1932 was by Jack Denny and his Waldorf–Astoria Orchestra (vocal by Paul Small). In later years the song became often associated with Frank Sinatra, becoming the last song he performed with Tommy Dorsey. Many other artists have recorded the song over the years, including Charlie Parker.

"The Song Is You" is the recurring musical theme of the 2003 Guy Maddin film The Saddest Music in the World. Nine different versions of the song were arranged for the film by composer Christopher Dedrick, whose work received a Genie Award.

Composer Alec Wilder writes that the song "attempts too dramatic a statement on too small a stage [...] it suggests a grander voice than that usually associated with popular theater music", but that it nonetheless possesses a "superior quality" as a composition, with a "masterful" release containing "brilliant" harmony and melody. It is written in AABA form.
