= Nicholas Laucella =

American flautist and composer

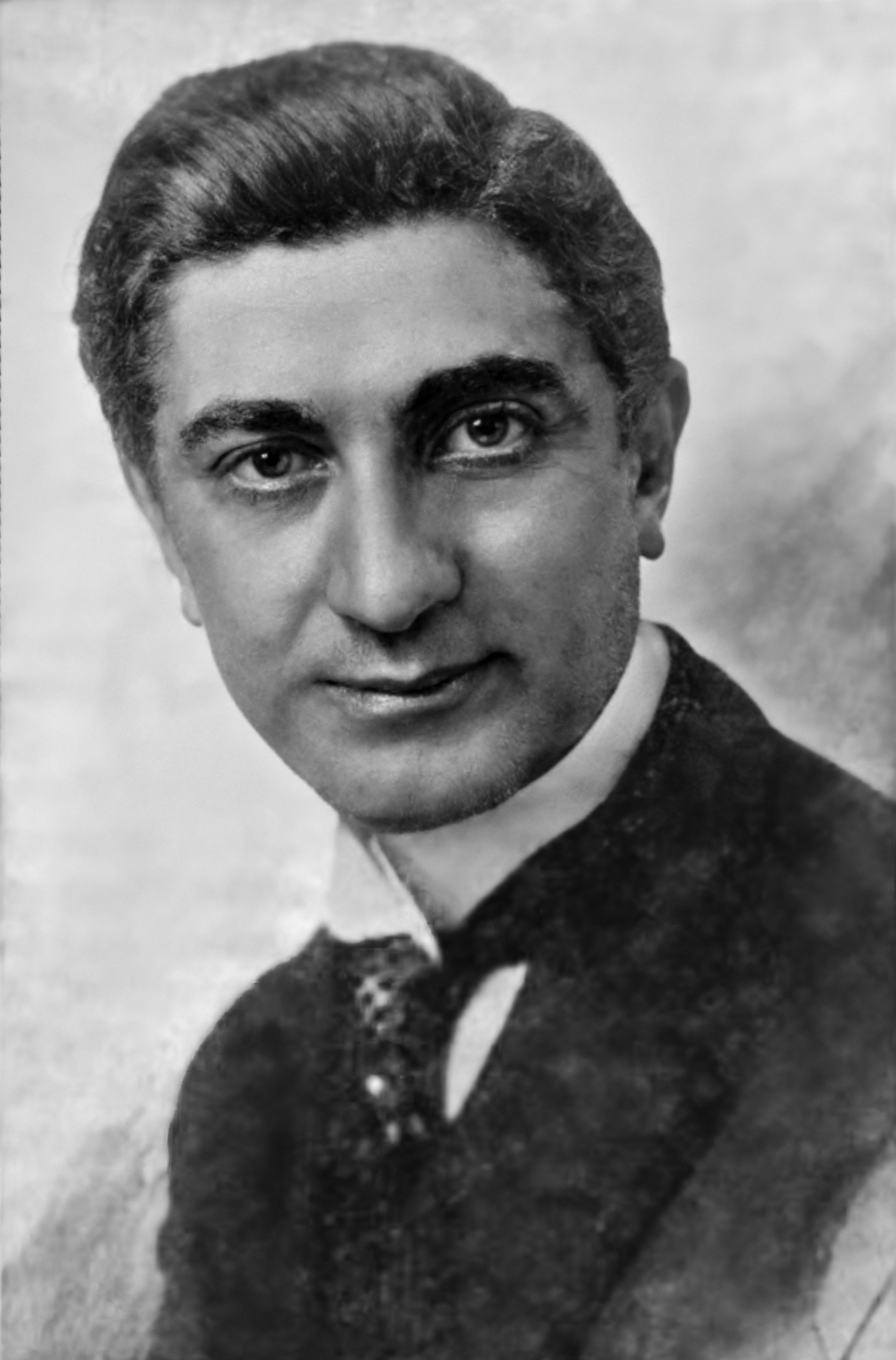
- Born: Nicola Laucella; July 1, 1882; Nusco, Italy
- Died: September 2, 1952 (aged 70); New York City, U.S.
- Occupations: Flautist; Composer
- Years active: 1904–1950
- Organizations: New York Philharmonic; Metropolitan Opera orchestra

Nicholas Laucella (born Nicola Laucella; July 1, 1882 – September 2, 1952) was an American concert flautist and composer. During the course of a professional musical career which spanned over three decades, he performed as the principal flute with several leading orchestral ensembles including the New York Philharmonic and the Metropolitan Opera Orchestra in New York City.

External audio
- Laucella performing in Ermanno Wolf-Ferrari's opera I gioielli della Madonna with the baritone Giuseppe De Luca and the Metropolitan Opera Orchestra conducted by Giulio Setti in 1930

== Early life and studies ==
Nicholas Laucella was born Nicola Laucella in the town of Nusco, in the Avellino province of Italy just outside Naples. He emigrated to the United States with his family in 1895 and settled in Corona, Queens, New York.

His early studies on the flute began in Italy and continued for an additional eight years after his arrival in America. During this time he also pursued professional studies in music theory, harmony, and musical composition. Laucella's primary mentor on the flute was the German soloist Carl Wehner, who served as the principal flute at the New York Philharmonic from 1892 until 1900 and as a solo flautist at the Metropolitan Opera Orchestra (1885–1886).

== Musical career ==
As a young man, Laucella first performed with an orchestra at the Eden Musée amusement center in New York City, which showcased musical concerts, public presentations of paintings, and motion pictures. Laucella's professional career took shape in the early 1900s when he was recruited by the Italian operatic composer Pietro Mascagni to serve as his principal flute during a concert tour in America and Canada. After returning to New York City, Laucella continued his studies on the flute with Wehner for several years.

By 1904, Laucella left New York City to accept a position playing with the Pittsburgh Symphony Orchestra under the Austrian conductor Emil Paur. Laucella remained on staff with the orchestra for three years until 1907. During this time he also continued his musical studies under Paur's direction.

After returning to New York City, Laucella was appointed to the position of principal flute at the New York Philharmonic under the musical direction of Gustav Mahler in 1909. He served in this capacity until 1911 and continued to perform with the orchestra until the completion of the 1918–1919 season. In addition to performing as an orchestral flautist, Laucella composed several orchestral works during this period, including Sunday at the Village (1914), Divertimento for Flute, Oboe and English Horn (1914), Prelude and Temple Dance (1915), and Whitehouse – Impressions of Norfolk (1917). He also conducted the New York Philharmonic in a performance of his Prelude and Temple Dance at Carnegie Hall in 1915.

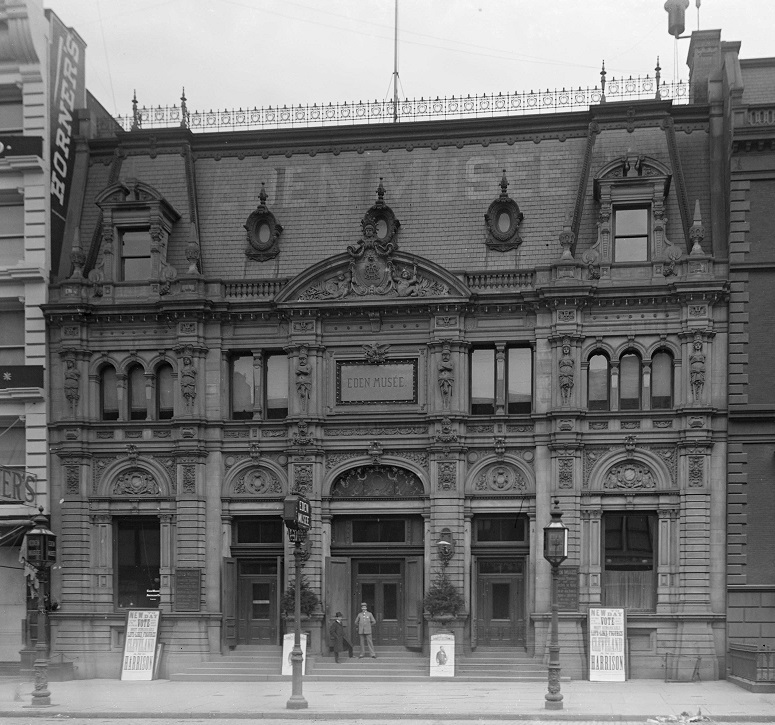
Eden Musée

In 1911, Laucella appeared under the musical direction of the Czech conductor Josef Stránský in the premiere of his symphonic poem Consalvo. Laucella dedicated his score to Stránský, who became the new conductor of the New York Philharmonic Society in 1911. The composition was premiered in Carnegie Hall and provides a musical setting for the poem by the Italian philosopher Giacomo Leopardi (1832). The performance was reviewed in The New Music Review, which applauded Laucella as a composer of a concise musical work with unusual promise.

Laucella's composition reflects the thoughts and emotions of a young man who is dying but whose wavering faith in mankind is reawakened by the kiss of his one unrequited love. In order to convey the deep despair which engulfs the dying man, Laucella scored the opening bars for the cellos and basses as Andante lugubre in B-minor. The poet's vision of his one true love is heralded by trumpets and trombones which are scored Allegro agitato in B-major and his prayer for one last kiss is scored as Maestoso e molto espresione in B-major. Subsequently, the motive of true love emerges tutti in both the strings and the woodwinds to the accompaniment of arpeggios in the harp. A decrescendo signals the young man's exhaustion which is accented by the rumble of the kettle drums. As sleep overcomes the poet, he is inspired by his beloved, which Laucella scored as Elvira: Moderato in F-major. A violent reawakening soon emerges and the music of the Andante lugubre returns with broad development and a subsequent return to the key of B major to underscore the poet's last thoughts: Nay, happy I esteem my lot. Two precious things the world still gives. To mortals, Love and Death. To one, heaven guides me now, in youth; and in the other, I am fortunate.

External image
- Photograph of Nicholas Laucella in 1919 Here on Google Books

Laucella premiered his Whitehouse - Impressions of Norfolk at the annual Litchfield County Norfolk Music Festival in Norfolk, Connecticut in 1917. The composition embodies Laucella's impressions of the festival's events and was dedicated to the gracious patrons of the festival Mr. and Mrs. Carl Stoeckel, whose residence was mentioned in the title of the work. Laucella utilized a recurring theme in the chimes throughout the work in tribute to the village's Congregational Church. Critics described the composition as a rich tapestry of musical textures and The New York Times praised Laucella's fondness for Italian tunefulness. Critics at The New York Tribune described his music as both graceful and melodic.

During this time Laucella achieved additional notoriety as a concert accompanist to the Spanish coloratura soprano Maria Barrientos during a concert tour in Worcester, Massachusetts. He also received recognition for his collaboration with the conductor Joseph Knecht and the Waldorf–Astoria Orchestra at the Waldorf Astoria Hotel in 1916. His opera Mokanna was completed circa 1915. It incorporates a libretto by Enrico Golisciani and is based on the poem Lalla-Rookh by Thomas Moore.

Based on these successful appointments, Laucella acquired the position of principal flute at the Metropolitan Opera Orchestra in 1919 under the musical direction of Artur Bodanzky. He continued to serve with this orchestra under the musical direction of Tullio Serafin until 1935. During his fifteen-year tenure with the Metropolitan Opera, Laucella accompanied several operatic soloists, including Giovanni Martinelli, Lawrence Tibbett, and Giuseppe De Luca. Laucella was also associated with the celebrated Italian-American harp virtuoso Salvatore Mario de Stefano, aka Stefano Di Stefano (1887–1981). In 1921 De Stefano dedicated the composition Danse Arabe (Op.10) from his Petite Suite Oriental (Opp. 8-10) to "my colleague Nicola Laucella"..

=== Recordings ===
Laucella's musical talents extended beyond the operatic concert hall. During the 1920s he recorded several works for the Victor label which included arrangements by the Peruvian composer Daniel Alomía Robles. As a member of the Trio Italiano ensemble, he also recorded several songs arranged for piano, guitar, flute, mandolin, and baritone. He also appeared as a performer with the Longo Trio and collaborated with Scipione Guidi in a recording of several popular songs including: The Meeting of the Waters and Believe Me if All Those Endearing Young Charms by Thomas Moore for the Pathe Freres label (# 22353). In 1930, he collaborated with the Italian Baritone Giuseppe De Luca in a recording of the flute obligato from the "Serenade" scene in the opera I gioielli della Madonna for Victor.

=== Death ===
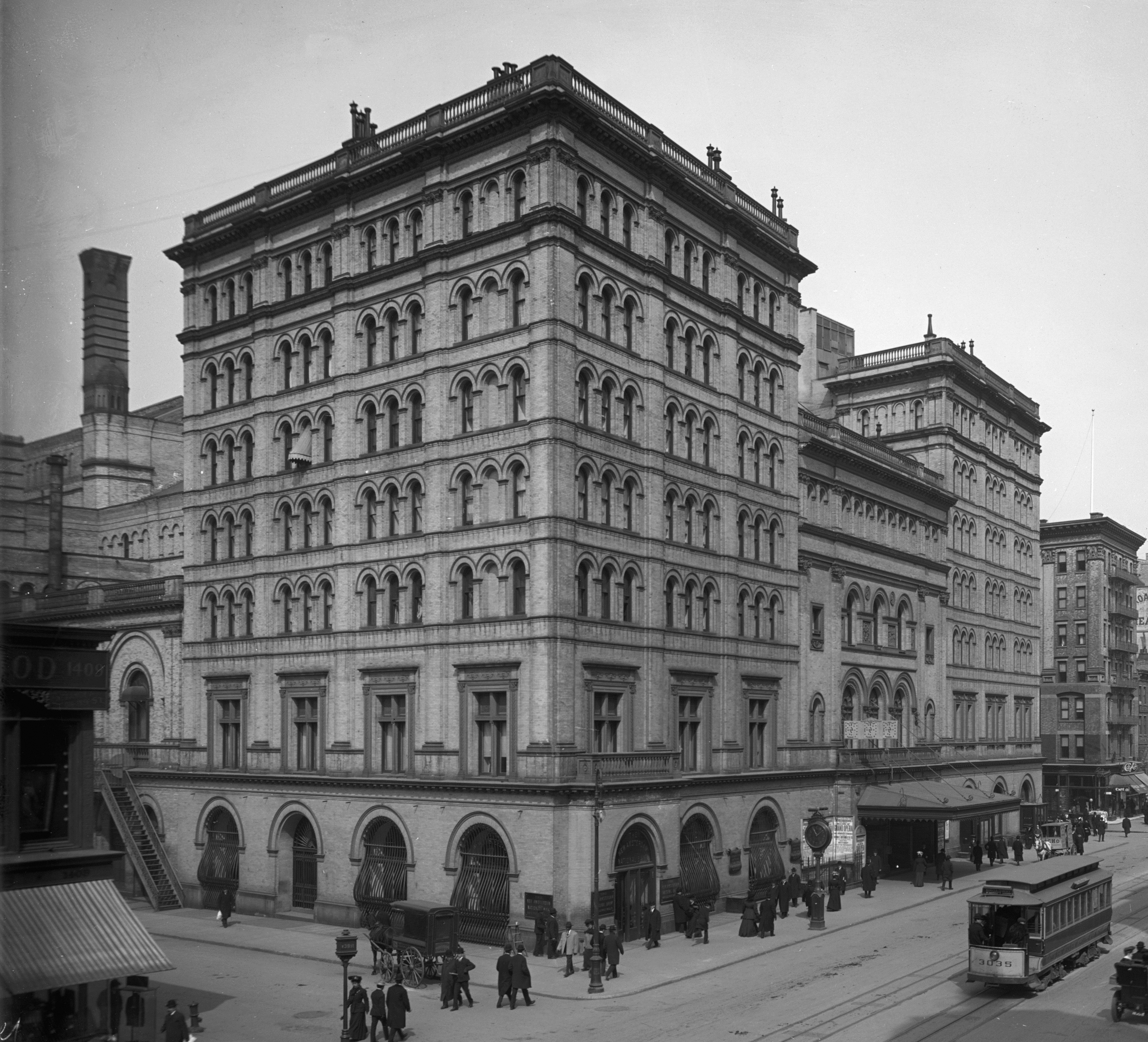
Metropolitan Opera 1905

Laucella died on September 2, 1952. His contributions to music as a flautist and composer were documented in the first edition of the International Who's Who in Music International and Musical Gazetteer.

== Works ==
Included among Laucella's compositions are the following works:

- String quartet (1910)
- Consalvo (symphonic poem, 1911)
- Nocturne for orchestra
- Divertimento for flute, oboe and English horn (1914)
- Sunday at the Village (1914)
- Prelude and Temple Dance (1915)
- Mokanna (opera in four acts, 1915)
- Fantastic Overture
- The Whitehouse-Impressions of Norfolk (symphonic impressions, 1917)

== Discography ==
External audio
- Nicholas Laucella performing Au la Nieve Se Dehace, La Palma, La Spiritosa with the Trio Italiano in 1923

Included within Laucella's discography are the following recordings:

- Gioielli della Madonna: Serenata – Victor (Catalogue #3055), as principal flute of the Metropolitan Opera Orchestra with baritone Giuseppe De Luca and conductor Giulio Setti (1930).
- Diamond Waltz – Victor (Catalogue # 73863), as a member of the Trio Italiano ensemble (1923).
- Maria Maria – Victor (Catalogue # 77654), as a member of the Trio Italiano ensemble (1923).
- La Spiritosa – Victor (Catalogue #73816), as a member of the Trio Italiano ensemble (1923).
- La Palma – Victor (Catalogue # 72869), as a member of a quartet for violin, flute, guitar, piano and vocal duet (1920).
- Aun la Nieve Se Deshace – Victor (Catalogue # 23691) (1920)
- Loin du Bal – Waltz Movement – Pathé (19??)
- Il bacio – The Kiss – Pathé (19??)
- Funeral March of a Marionette – Pathé (circa 1916–1922)

== Archived works ==
External videos
- You may view Nicola Lucella's markings on scores used at the New York Philharmonic Here on archives.nyphil.org

- Copies of several orchestra scores which were marked by Nicola Laucella during his tenure with the New York Philharmonic have been archived by the orchestra for the benefit of future musicians, students and research scholars.
- Audio recordings by Nicola Laucella have been archived within the Discography of American Historical Recordings at the University of California Santa Barbara Library.
- Audio recordings by Nicola Laucella have been archived at the Library of Congress National Jukebox
