= Jack Whiting =

Jack Whiting may refer to:

- Jack Whiting (actor) (1901–1961), American actor, singer and dancer
- Jack Whiting (cricketer) (1894–1975), English cricketer
