= Nicoletta Panni =

Italian opera singer

Nicoletta Panni (27 August 1933 - 12 September 2017) was an Italian lyric soprano.

== Biography ==
Born in Rome, Panni was the granddaughter of Giuseppe De Luca, and was trained as a singer at the Accademia di Santa Cecilia under Giannina Arangi Lombardi. Her debut came in Trieste in 1957, when she sang Blanche in Dialogues of the Carmelites by Francis Poulenc. She bowed at La Scala in 1962, singing Euridice in Orfeo ed Euridice by Christoph Willibald Gluck. During her career she sang throughout Italy, appearing at the Piccola Scala, the Teatro la Fenice, the Teatro San Carlo, and the Teatro Regio di Torino. She appeared abroad as well, singing at the Liceu and Teatro Nacional de São Carlos. 1962 saw her American debut, as Marguerite in Faust by Charles Gounod at the Philadelphia Opera. The following year saw her debut at the Metropolitan Opera as Mimi in La Bohème. She later sang Marguerite at the Met. She appeared with Lyric Opera of Chicago in 1964 as Zerlina in Don Giovanni and Micaela in Carmen, and in 1965 performed Leonora in Il trovatore for Baltimore. Her career continued at various European houses until ending during the 1970s.

Panni died in Rome.
