= Giuseppe De Luca =

Italian opera singer (1876–1950)

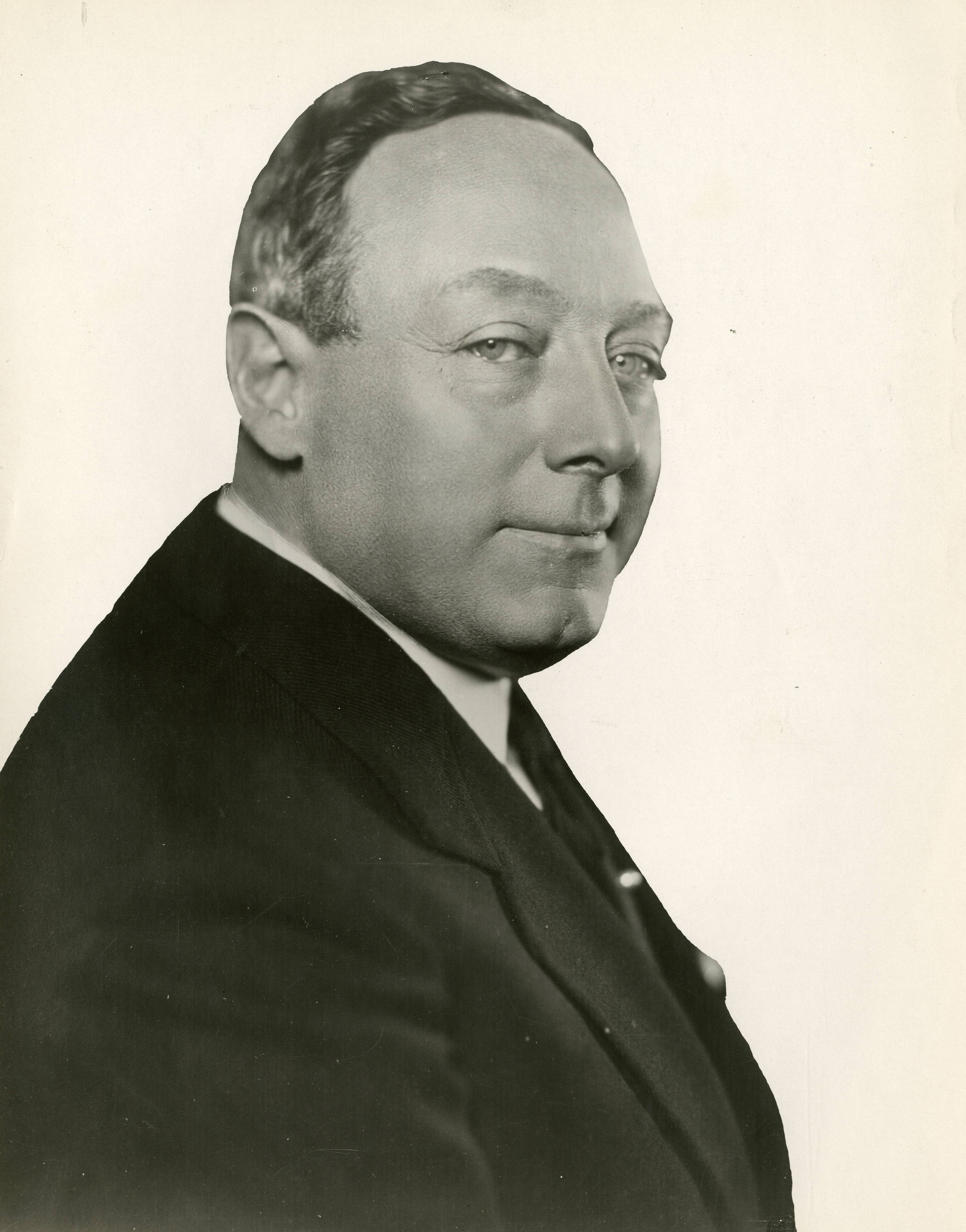
- De Luca in 1929
- Born: 25 December 1876; Rome, Kingdom of Italy
- Died: 26 August 1950 (aged 73); Manhattan, New York City. U.S.

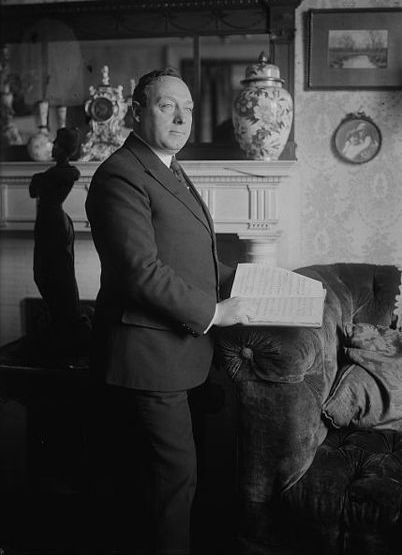
Giuseppe de Luca in 1917

Giuseppe De Luca (25 December 1876 – 26 August 1950), was an Italian baritone who achieved his greatest triumphs at the Metropolitan Opera in New York City. He notably created roles in the world premieres of two operas by Giacomo Puccini: Sharpless in Madama Butterfly (at La Scala, Milan, 1904) and the title role in Gianni Schicchi (Metropolitan Opera, 1918).

== Biography ==
De Luca was born on Christmas Day, 25 December 1876 in Rome, the son of a blacksmith. He sang in church choirs as a boy. After his voice broke, a wealthy patron paid for him to have singing lessons at the Rome Conservatory, where he studied with two top-class pedagogues, Venceslao Persichini (who also taught De Luca's fellow baritone stars Mattia Battistini and Titta Ruffo) and Antonio Cotogni. He made his operatic debut at Piacenza in 1897, singing Valentin in Gounod's Faust. His debut proved a success and he was invited to sing at a string of more important venues.

De Luca was renowned as a master of lyric, smooth-toned legato singing. A small man, De Luca's voice was notable for having ample carrying power in large theaters. During De Luca's best years his voice also possessed a great amount of tone, in the middle register particularly. His acting was praised, and De Luca was considered to be especially memorable in comic roles.

He appeared at Italy's foremost opera house, La Scala, Milan, from 1902 to 1910, and made his London debut at the Royal Opera House, Covent Garden, in 1907. De Luca first sang in Buenos Aires in 1903; he made his debut at the Teatro Colón in 1909, where he sang in 25 different operas in seven seasons between that year and 1926. Subsequently, De Luca moved to America where he became a leading baritone at the Metropolitan Opera for 20 years, from 1915 to 1935. (He returned briefly to the Met in 1939–1940.) His first appearance at that house was on 25 November 1915, as Figaro in The Barber of Seville with Frieda Hempel as Rosina and Giacomo Damacco as Count Almaviva, with Gaetano Bavagnoli conducting.

After his retirement, he taught voice at the Juilliard School. He died at Columbus Hospital in New York City on 26 August 1950 at the age of 73.

De Luca was the grandfather of soprano Nicoletta Panni.

== Legacy ==
De Luca is notable for creating two important Puccini roles: Sharpless in Madama Butterfly (La Scala, 1904) and the title role in Gianni Schicchi (Metropolitan Opera, 1918). He also created the Marquess in Massenet's Grisélidis, Michonnet in Cilea's Adriana Lecouvreur, and Gleby in Giordano's Siberia (1903).

The illustrious conductor Arturo Toscanini is reputed to have once called De Luca "absolutely the best baritone I ever heard". Certainly, he was praised by critics and audiences alike in a wide range of operatic roles, ranging from buffo and bel canto parts through to the core Verdi and Puccini characters. He even made some early forays into Wagner during his days at La Scala (Like several Italian singers of that era, he eschewed the German language, singing only in Italian and French).

External audio
- De Luca performing in Ermanno Wolf-Ferrari's opera I gioielli della Madonna with the flautist Nicholas Laucella and the Metropolitan Opera Orchestra conducted by Giulio Setti in 1930

De Luca's elegant vocalism is preserved on numerous recordings which he made for the Gramophone, Fonotipia and Victor companies in Italy and America from the early 1900s through to the 1920s and '30s. On some of them, he is partnered by other great singers of the Metropolitan Opera's golden age, including Enrico Caruso, Giovanni Martinelli, Beniamino Gigli, Amelita Galli-Curci, Elisabeth Rethberg, Rosa Ponselle and Ezio Pinza. CD reissues of his recordings are widely available today. Film clips of him performing also exist.
