= Waldorf-Astoria Orchestra =

American orchestra

External audio
- Xavier Cugat conducting the Waldorf Astoria Orchestra with his wife Carmen Castillo performing his song "Yours" in the 1940's Here on archive.org

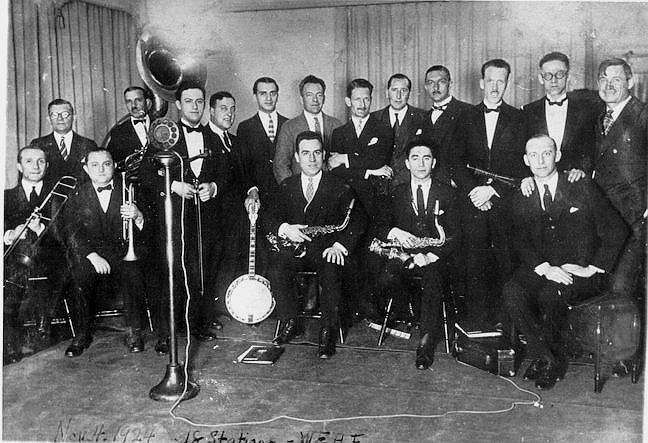
Waldorf-Astoria Dance Orchestra in 1924. Will Rogers (standing right), Art Gillham, Wendell Hall, Carson Robison, the Eveready Quartet, Graham McNamee.

Waldorf-Astoria Orchestra album with a Cugat caricature

The Waldorf-Astoria Orchestra was an orchestra that played primarily at the Waldorf Astoria Hotel, both the old and new locations. In addition to providing dinner music at the famous hotel, the orchestra made over 300 recordings and many radio broadcasts. It was established in the 1890s, and was directed by Carlo Curti in early 1900s, Joseph Knecht at least from 1908 to 1925, later by Jack Denny and others, and then Xavier Cugat from approximately 1933 to 1949.

Denny and the Waldorf-Astoria Orchestra appeared in the movie Moonlight and Pretzels in 1933. Both Denny and Cugat had their own orchestras when they began playing at the Waldorf-Astoria, so the term "Waldorf-Astoria orchestras" might be an appropriate description.

== History ==
The Waldorf-Astoria hotel was originally built as two separate adjacent hotels, the Waldorf in 1893 and the Astoria in 1897. Both were on the land that is now occupied by the Empire State Building, and the two hotels were connected after construction of the second one. The hotel had its current site on Park Avenue built in 1931. In addition to the normal function of a hotel to house its guests and provide them with amenities, the Waldorf-Astoria had an extensive program of social activities, to include concerts by top artists and an orchestra to provide music for its dinner guests.

An 1898 New York Times article mentions that the Waldorf-Astoria Orchestra played at the Astoria, and a 1901 New York Times Article mentions "Prof. Clappe, leader of the Waldorf-Astoria Orchestra, and the other fifteen performers."

In his autobiography, Nathaniel Shilkret, a member of the orchestra in its early days, provides information about the orchestra and anecdotal stories about several of its members. Shilkret says he was a member of the orchestra while attending the City College of New York. A search of the college's files shows Shilkret attended classes in the Fall 1904 semester and is listed as an alumnus, Class of ex'1910. This information establishes Knecht as director prior to 1910. Shilkret described the hotel as "almost a conservatory, rather than a hotel engagement. ... There were thirty-five men engaged steadily for the dining rooms. In the Rose Room, Caruso records were played, with our group following the music of the record." Shilkret said that there were nightly concerts from 9 pm to 10 pm, with the orchestra enlarged to fifty on Sundays, and chamber music from 11 pm to 1 am, with Joseph Knecht as director.

Music historian Howard Pollack says, "This hotel orchestra, comprising a highly trained group of mostly Italian and Jewish musicians, regularly gave serious concerts, including one that [George] Gershwin attended on April 13, 1913, at which [Charles] Hambitzer performed the first movement of Anton Rubinstein's Piano Concerto in D Minor." Pollack says Hambitzer came to New York no later than 1908 and began playing in the string section (Hambitzer played many instruments) of the Waldorf-Astoria Orchestra. In 1916, Nicholas Laucella collaborated as the principal flautist with Joseph Knecht in a performance of his work Introduction and Temple Dance for an appreciative audience in the Grand Ballroom. Later in the early 1930s, the orchestral accordionist John Serry collaborated in the early years of his career with the orchestra under the direction of Misha Borr at various performance venues within the Waldor-Astoria hotel including: The Starlight Room, The Grand Ballroom and the Waldorf Towers, as well as later in his career in 1948 at The Wedgewood Room.

A 1919 New York Times article states that, "Joseph Knecht led an 'all-American' program recently by the Waldorf Orchestra, whose twenty-five men have played together for twenty years," but does not indicate whether or not the orchestra played for the Waldorf-Astoria for its entire twenty-year existence. Two New York Times articles note the beginning and ending of the Waldorf-Astoria Orchestra's thirteenth season of Sunday concerts, which would imply that the Sunday concert feature of the orchestra began in 1912. New York Times articles from 1926 refer to "Knecht's Silvertone Dance Orchestra" and "Knecht's orchestra," without any reference to the Waldorf-Astoria, from which it seems that Knecht's association with the Waldorf-Astoria ended in 1925. A New York Times obituary says that Knecht died on May 30, 1931.

Denny and the Waldorf-Astoria Orchestra appeared in the movie Moonlight and Pretzels in 1933.

== Conductors ==
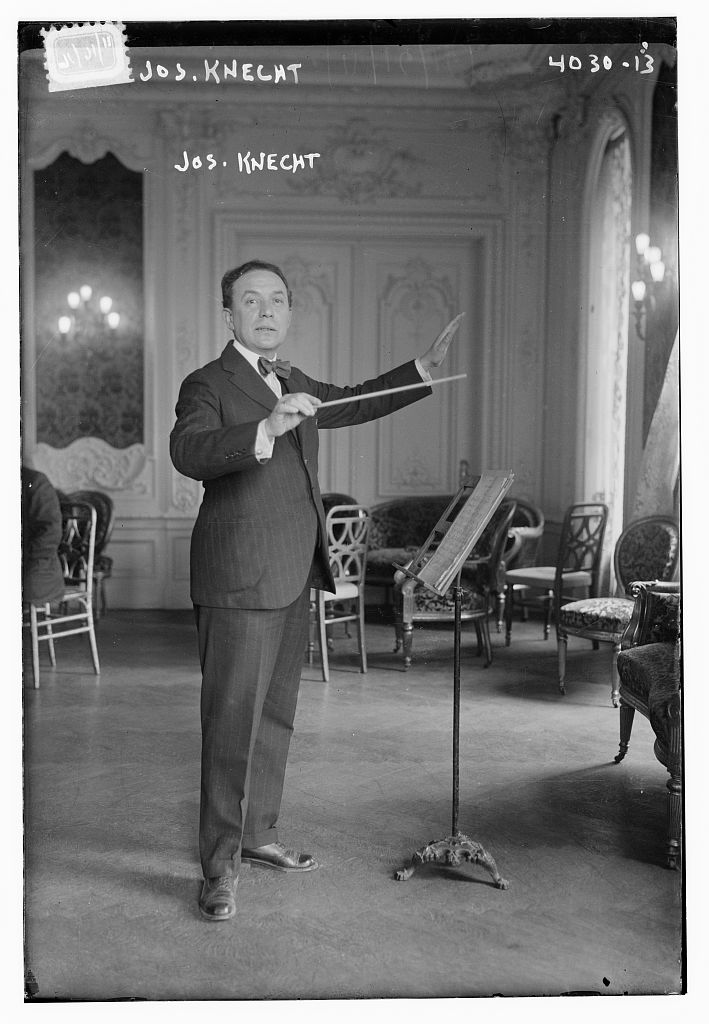
Joseph Knecht conductor of the orchestra in 1916

- Carlo Curti, early 1900s
- Joseph Knecht, 1908 to 1925
- Harold Leonard, 1926 to 1927
- Meyer Davis, 1929 to 1932
- Nat Brandywine, 1932
- Jack Denny, 1932
- Oscar Adler, 1933
- Xavier Cugat, 1933–1949
- Emil Coleman, 1940s–1950s

== Early members ==
A picture of the Waldorf-Astoria Orchestra, dated March 4, 1918, and marked "to Mr. Oscar Tschirky on his 25th anniversary" is signed by each member of the orchestra. Tschirky was the maître d' of the Waldorf-Astoria and was very well known. From the signatures on the picture, together with information from Shilkret's autobiography, his payroll for his radio orchestras from 1928 through 1933 and the New York Philharmonic Archives, the orchestra members, and their principal instrument when known, include the following, with question marks indicating the signatures were not clear: Joseph Knecht (director), V. Adamo, F. Cardone?, N. Cassellee?, Leonard D'Amico (violin), Edward Davis, Carl W. Dodge (cello), Joseph Febbraio (horn), R. Fritock, Nicholas Garagusi (violin; Boys' Symphony Orchestra of New York soloist and concertmaster in 1902), Roy R. Haines (trombone), Charles J. Hambitzer (George Gershwin's principal piano teacher), Louison? Heidelberg, Edward Kilenyi (violin), A. Kirchner (bassoon), Peter Le Fina, Frank Longo (piano), Benjamin Posner (violin), D. Reggel, D. Saeirtel, Max Schlossberg (trumpet), Nathaniel Shilkret (clarinet), Harry K. Spedick, Stefano L. Stefan?, F. Tantangelo, Van Praag, George Vaughn (clarinet), O. Walther. Shilkret also cites Dan Marshall as a flute player in the orchestra under Knecht.

Several New York Times articles mention the Waldorf-Astoria Orchestra with various conductors, including Harold Leonard (1926–1927), Meyer Davis (1929–1932), Nat Brandywine (1932), Jack Denny (1932), and Oscar Adler (1933). Meyer Davis's Waldorf-Astoria Orchestra is sometimes described as directed by Bill Artzt, Joe Moss, and Mischa Borr, instead of Davis himself. Denny departed when Xavier Cugat's Orchestra began creating a stir at the Waldorf-Astoria. Cugat never had a contract with the Waldorf-Astoria, but his band reigned supreme there for 16 years. He began with a salary of $500 per week which escalated to $7,000 per week plus a percentage of the door.

In the 1940s and 1950s the conductor Emil Coleman also appeared regularly with the orchestra at the Waldorf-Astoria's famed Wedgwood Room. He also recorded several rhumbas, tangos and sambas for the DeLuxe Records label with the orchestra during this time. Mischa Borr also appeared with the Waldorf-Astoria Dance Orchestra at the hotel's Starlight Roof and the Empire Rooms during this period. He also recorded several songs with the orchestra on the Victor label in 1946.

== Recordings ==
External audio
- You may listen to Emil Coleman conducting the Waldorf Astoria Orchestra performing "La Cumparsita" in 1946 Here on archive.org

Knecht and Cugat each directed over 150 recordings with the Waldorf-Astoria Orchestra. Denny also made a significant number of recordings, but only about fifteen appeared with the Waldorf-Astoria name.

The first recording by the orchestra was Maytime Waltz, recorded on December 10, 1917, and issued as Victor 18432. Whitburn lists this recordings being charted as a number 9 hit the following year, and lists three other Waldorf-Astoria Orchestra recordings as being "charted," including Beautiful Ohio, which was listed as charted number one in 1919. The orchestra made recordings for several different record companies, with the last recording directed by Knecht being made for Edison in November 1925. On Ca. 1921 Columbia records it is credited as "The Waldorf-Astoria Singing Orchestra".

Denny recorded for Victor in 1932, including an experimental LP recording.

Cugat also directed over 150 recordings with the orchestra between 1937 and 1942, the earlier recordings for Victor and the later ones for Columbia. Whitburn lists twenty-one of the Cugat recordings as "charted."

Emil Coleman recorded with the orchestra during the 1940s for the Deluxe label. Similarly, in 1946, Mischa Borr also recorded with the orchestra on the Victor label.

== Radio broadcasts ==
The orchestra was one of the earliest orchestras heard on radio. Broadcasts began on WJZ in Newark, New Jersey, and continued throughout the 1920s as the network chain was established.

On February 4, 1923, The Washington Post reported:

The Sunday evening concert of the Waldorf-Astoria orchestra numbers, under the leadership of Joseph Knecht, will continue to be broadcast through the month of February, according to a statement made by WJZ, Newark.

Sies describes details of a spring 1924 broadcast of classical music on Dinner Music from the Rose Room on WEAF (soon to be the flagship station of the NBC network), and The New York Times said that the Rose Room Dinner Music was a favorite program for listeners of WEAF for many years.

The Eveready Hour article includes a picture (see Commons below) which is labeled as including the Waldorf-Astoria Orchestra in a publicity picture for the November 4, 1924, Eveready Hour broadcast. Neither the musicians nor the instrumentation match the 1918 photograph of the orchestra cited above.

By 1928, the Waldorf-Astoria Orchestra was heard Saturdays in the New York area on WABC and WEAF, in Washington, D.C., on WRC, and it was also heard in Detroit (WWJ), Boston (WEEI) and WCAE (Hartford). The music was usually on at 6pm to provide what was labeled "dinner music," and NBC broadcast it throughout the United States in the 1930s. Minus a brass section, the 1932 orchestra that Jack Denny helmed at the Waldorf-Astoria employed three pianos, clarinets, saxophones, strings and possibly a French horn or oboe.

== See also ==
- Big band remote
