= Harry Liston =

English comedian and actor

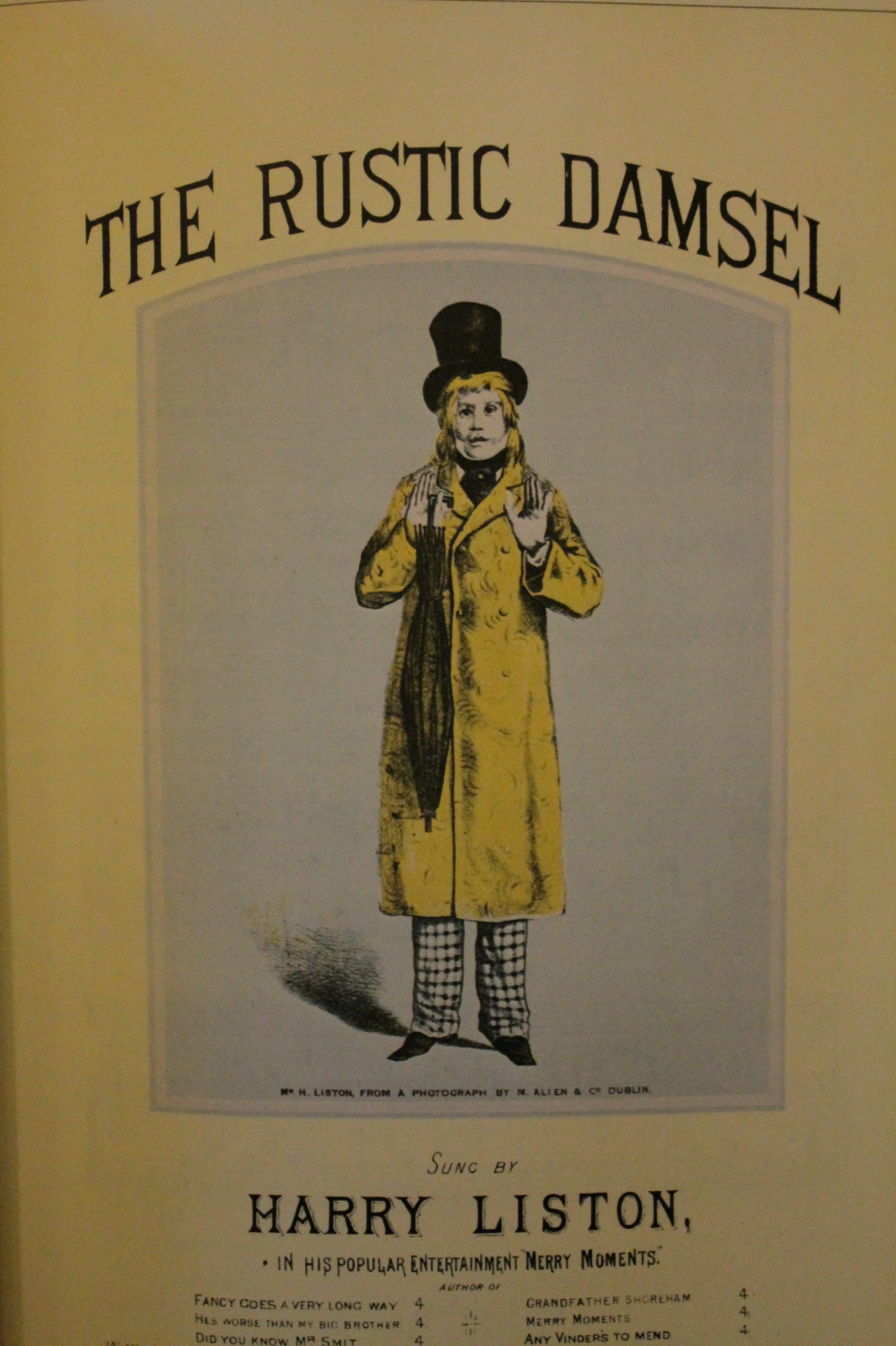
Sheet music cover - The Rustic Damsel by Harry Liston 1870

Harry Liston (born John Greenhough; 7 October 1843 – 12 April 1929) was an English comedian and actor who appeared in music hall, variety shows and other entertainments during the Victorian era and in the first decades of the 20th century.

== Biography ==
=== Early life ===
Born in Stockport, Cheshire, Liston started work as a commercial traveller before deciding upon a career as a performer.

=== Career and later life ===
Liston made his performing début at the Scotia Music Hall, Glasgow in 1863, continuing on the music hall circuit. Two years later, he moved to London and adopted a new style of performing as a Lion comique. He became associated with many popular comedians of the day, including Arthur Lloyd, George Leybourne and Alfred Vance. His repertoire included such songs as "The Ginger-haired Swell", "Naughty Mary Ann" and "I'll Tell Your Wife". Perhaps his best known song became his signature tune, "When Johnny Comes Marching Home". By 1888 and with the Lion comique becoming out of date, Liston developed a new entertainment, "Merry Moments", with which he toured concert halls throughout the country.

In later years and with music hall on the decline, Liston made a successful transition to variety. He performed in the northern provinces for the remainder of his career.

Liston retired in 1925 and died four years later, in Manchester, aged 85.
