= Jack Denny =

American dance band leader (1895-1950)

Jack Denny (September 25, 1895 – September 15, 1950) was an American dance band leader during the pre-World War II years. He was born in the United States and started his musical career in Montreal, Quebec in 1920.

Throughout the 1920s and 1930s, Denny led dance bands with a conventionally styled orchestra during the 1920s, playing at various venues, including the Mount Royal Hotel in Montreal, Canada. In 1931, he relocated to New York City, where he played at the newly opened Waldorf-Astoria Hotel the following year. Denny's band quickly gained popularity among the high society clientele of the Waldorf-Astoria, prompting him to develop a sweet and marvelous sound that had no brass section. His arrangements were often complex and fast-paced, unique for a sweet band.

The Waldorf-Astoria Orchestra consisted of four saxes, three violins, bass, piano, and drums, with the pianist sometimes doubling on accordion. They recorded around two dozen titles for Victor in 1932 and appeared in the film Moonlight and Pretzels in 1933.

After leading his band for many years, Denny retired from the band business about six years before his death and worked as a salesman for the Baldwin Piano Company. He died on September 15, 1950, at the age of 54. At the time of his death, he was survived by his wife.
