= Gyula Kovács (drummer) =

Gyula Kovács (27 December 1929 – 13 February 1992) was a Hungarian drummer and music educator. He was widely recognized by American music critics as one of the best jazz drummers in Europe.

== Life and career ==
Gyula Kovács was born in Budapest, Hungary on December 27, 1929. He was educated at the Franz Liszt Academy of Music. He played with a band led by Filu (real name Fülöp Schenkelbach) in 1949–1950 and then in Lajos Martiny's quintet from 1950 through 1962. He made recordings with Martiny in 1960. In 1958–1959 he recorded with Andor Kovács. In 1962–1963 he played in Mihály Tabányi's band. He made several recordings with Aladár Pege from 1964 to 1968 and with Csaba Deseő from 1967 to 1969. He also recorded with a quintet whose other members included the pianist János Gonda and the vibraphonist Richard Kruza in 1969 and 1976.

Kovács also organized his own trio and quartet for performances and recording in the 1960s. From 1965 until his death in 1992 he taught on the faculty of the Béla Bartók Musical Training College (formerly the National Conservatory).

Kovács died at the age of 62 on February 13, 1992, in Budapest.
