= Honey (Rudy Vallée song) =

- Sheet music, 1929

Single by Rudy Vallée & his Connecticut Yankees
- Released: 1929
- Songwriter(s): Seymour Simons; Haven Gillespie; Richard A. Whiting

"Honey" is a popular song written by Seymour Simons, Haven Gillespie and Richard A. Whiting and published by Leo Feist, Inc. The song was a 1929 hit for Rudy Vallée & his Connecticut Yankees and another popular version was by Ben Selvin. It was also featured in the 1945 film Her Highness and the Bellboy.

Many other artists have recorded the song over the years.

"Honey"
Recorded by Rudy Vallée & His Connecticut Yankees in 1929
