= Joseph Knecht =

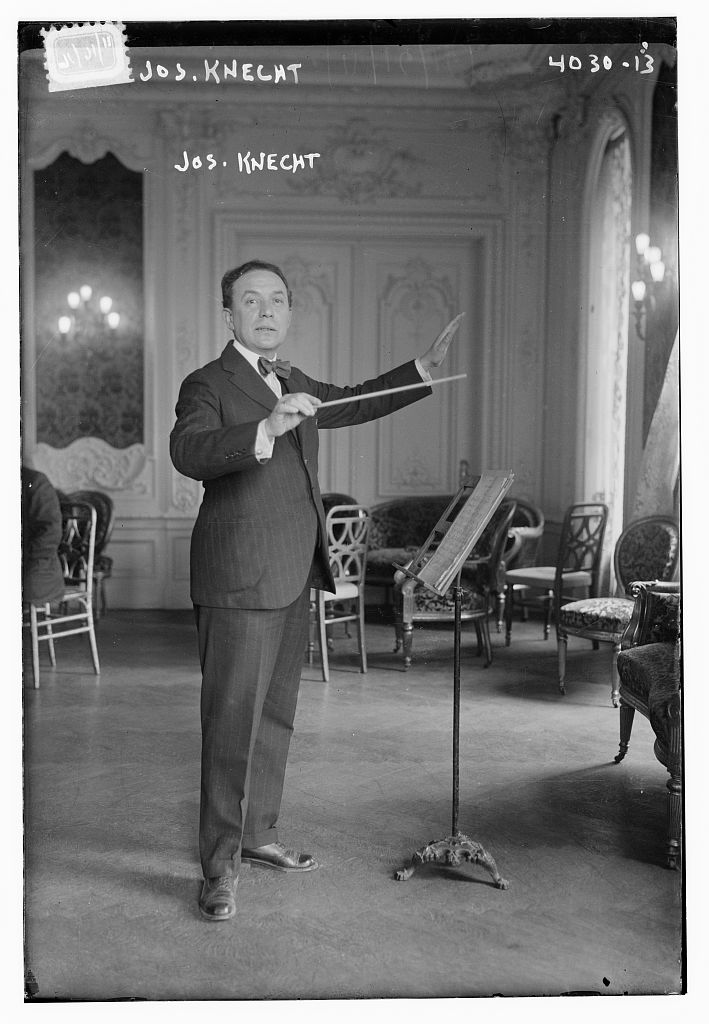
Knecht in 1916

Joseph M. Knecht (1864 – May 30, 1931) was the conductor of the Waldorf-Astoria Orchestra from 1908 to 1925.

== History ==
Joseph Knecht was born in 1864 in Bukovina in the Austrian Empire, where he played the violin from an early age. Knecht studied civil engineering at the Vienna University of Technology, earning money by playing in the Vienna Hofburg theater. He abandoned civil engineering to study violin at the Vienna Conservatory, after which he played in the orchestra of the Vienna State Opera under Hans Richter. It was apparently Wilhelm Gericke who offered him a position with the Boston Symphony Orchestra. According to Knecht's naturalization record, of 29 May 1905, he arrived in the United States in September 1887. After Boston he moved to the Metropolitan Opera where he advanced to assistant concertmaster then associate conductor. On 4 August 1898 he married Emelie Krafft in Hoboken, New Jersey; and in 1901 they had a daughter, Florence, who married Robert K. Beggs.

In 1908 George C Bold, president of the Waldorf-Astoria invited Knecht to form the Waldorf-Astoria Orchestra, a symphony orchestra that performed at the hotel during the summer when the Metropolitan was closed. The innovation was so successful that it became Knecht's full-time, year-round occupation in 1912, and continued until May 1926, when he resigned to concentrate on his radio work. In his sixties, from February 1925 he was also conductor of the popular B. F. Goodrich Silvertown Cord Band on the sponsored radio show. They toured vaudeville with vocalist Joseph M White (who was billed as The Silver-Masked Tenor). 'Variety' for 18 March 1925 confirms that the Waldorf-Astoria Orchestra and the Silvertown Cord Band were one and the same band; and has a sentence that "The Knecht organization under its various names is the most prolific radio band in the country". They were on the air 15 times a week. For WEAF they were the studio-based Silvertown band and were relayed nightly from the Waldorf-Astoria playing dinner music as the Waldorf-Astoria Orchestra. For WJZ they did afternoon and tea relays from the Waldorf-Astoria as the Waldorf-Astoria Orchestra. Knecht later became a conductor for one of the National Broadcasting Company orchestras.

Knecht and the Waldorf-Astoria orchestra recorded for Victor from 10 December 1917 until 29 November 1918; for Columbia from 24 December 1918 to 16 October 1919; and for Okeh from October 1919 to December 1921. There then seems to be a gap in Knecht’s recording career until he led the B F Goodrich Silvertown Cord Band back at Victor from 22 September 1925 to 31 January 1928.

He died on May 30, 1931, of heart disease in Manhattan.
