= Jack Whiting (cricketer) =

English cricketer (1894–1975)

Personal information
- Full name: John George Benjamin Whiting
- Born: 19 February 1892; Stoke Goldington, Buckinghamshire, England
- Died: 15 July 1975 (aged 83); Newport Pagnell, Buckinghamshire, England
- Bowling: Right-arm fast

Domestic team information
- Years: Team
- 1920–1922: Buckinghamshire
- 1921: HDG Leveson-Gower's XI

Career statistics
| Competition | First-class |
|---|---|
| Matches | 2 |
| Runs scored | 34 |
| Batting average | 8.50 |
| 100s/50s | 0/0 |
| Top score | 27 |
| Balls bowled | 285 |
| Wickets | 6 |
| Bowling average | 45.33 |
| 5 wickets in innings | 0 |
| 10 wickets in match | 0 |
| Best bowling | 4/76 |
| Catches/stumpings | 0/– |
- Source: Cricinfo, 27 June 2011

John George Benjamin Whiting (19 February 1894 – 15 July 1975) was an English cricketer. Whiting's batting style is unknown, but he was a right-arm fast bowler. He was born in Stoke Goldington, Buckinghamshire.

Whiting made his debut for Buckinghamshire in the 1920 Minor Counties Championship against Hertfordshire. He played Minor counties cricket for Buckinghamshire from 1920 to 1922, making 13 Minor Counties Championship appearances. Whiting made two first-class appearances for HDG Leveson-Gower's XI in 1921. The first came against Oxford University. He took a single wicket in the Oxford first-innings, while in their second-innings he took a further 4 wickets. He was dismissed by Reginald Bettington for a duck in his first-innings, while in the second-innings he scored 27 runs before being dismissed by Douglas Jardine. His second first-class match came against Cambridge University. He took a single wicket in this match, that of Cambridge captain Gilbert Ashton, for the cost of 83 runs from 17 overs. With the bat, he was caught and bowled for 6 runs by Jack Bryan in his first-innings, while in the second-innings he was dismissed for a single run by Percy Chapman. Both of these matches were held at The Saffrons in Eastbourne, Sussex. His 6 first-class wickets came at an average of 45.33, with him taking best figures of 4/76.

He died in Newport Pagnell, Buckinghamshire on 15 July 1975.
