= Giulio Setti =

Italian choral conductor

Giulio Setti in 1924

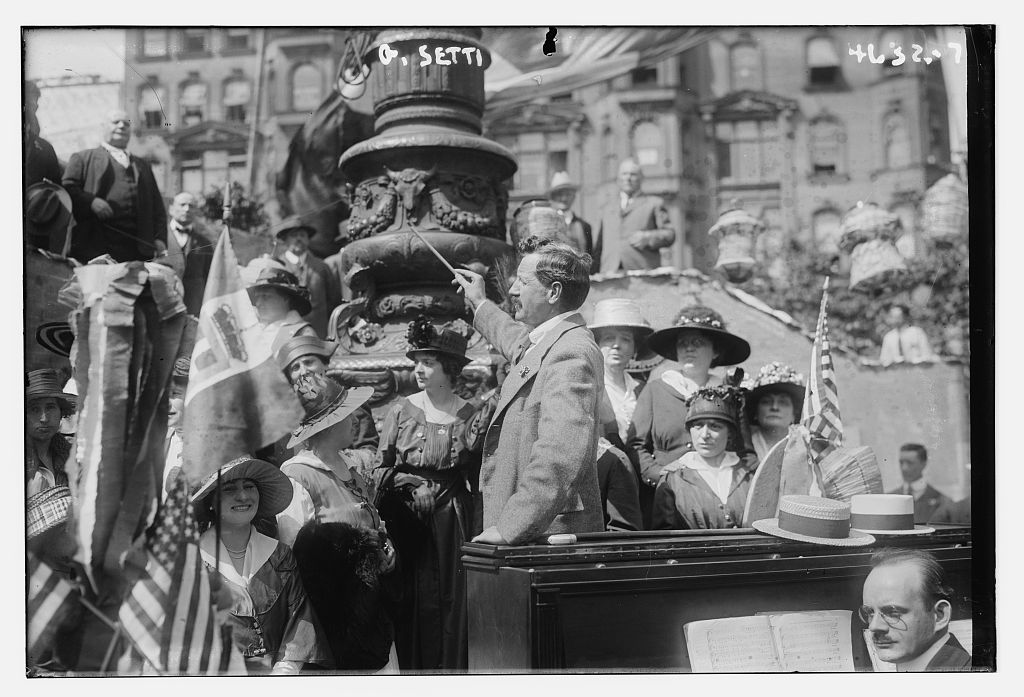
Giulio Setti in 1918

Giulio Setti (born Treviglio, October 3, 1869 - died Turin, October 2, 1938) was an Italian choral conductor.

== Biography ==
He served as chorus master of opera houses in Italy, Cairo, Cologne, and Buenos Aires prior to coming to the United States in 1908; there he was engaged as chorus master of the Metropolitan Opera. He remained in the post twenty-seven years before retiring, after which he returned to Italy.
