= Paradise Again World Tour =

2022 concert tour by Swedish House Mafia

Paradise Again World Your
- World tour by Swedish House Mafia
- Associated album: Paradise Again
- Start date: 29 July 2022
- End date: 11 November 2022
- Legs: 3
- No. of shows: 40

Swedish House Mafia concert chronology
- Save the World Reunion Tour (2019); Paradise Again World Tour (2022)

The Paradise Again World Tour was the fourth concert tour by Swedish supergroup Swedish House Mafia, in support of their 2022 album, Paradise Again. The tour originally had 44 dates, some of which were cancelled, though the band also added three dates (Los Angeles & a second San Francisco show) to the tour, and moved a show from MetLife Stadium to Madison Square Garden, as well as adding a 2nd date at MSG, one of which was cancelled.

== Buildup ==
Before the tour began, the album was released in April 2022, this was followed by sets at Coachella alongside The Weeknd, after a last minute lineup change. They were originally scheduled to close the Friday night. During Coachella they also played an exclusive Spotify set, this was invite only and done as a release party. There where no other public shows between April 2022 and a set in July 2022 shortly before the tour began, this took place in Ibiza.

== Setlist ==
This set list is representative of the show in Miami on July 29, 2022. It is not intended to represent all concerts for the tour.

1. "Can U Feel It"
2. "It Gets Better (Stockholm Version)" / "Greyhound" / "Can U Feel It"
3. "Miami 2 Ibiza (Swedish House Mafia 2022 Rework)" / "Can U Feel It"
4. "Sacrifice (Remix)"
5. "19.30" / "We Come, We Rave, We Love"
6. "Calling On" / "Laktos"
7. "Lifetime (Swedish House Mafia 2022 Rework)" / "Be" / "Show Me Love" / Knas"
8. "Calling" / "Tell Me Why"
9. "Frankenstein" / "More Than You Know" / "Teasing Mr. Charlie"
10. "Antidote (Swedish House Mafia 2022 Rework)"
11. "Redlight"
12. "Dream Bigger"
13. "One (Your Name)"
14. "Don't Go Mad"
15. "For Sale (Swedish House Mafia Remode)" / "Jack U"
16. "Rave n' Roll (Corey James Remix)"
17. "Time" / "Reload"
18. "Leave The World Behind (Swedish House Mafia 2022 Rework)"
19. "Love Inc" / "In My Mind (Axwell Mix)" / "Phunk (Swedish House Mafia 2022 Rework)"
20. "Suffocate" / "Turn On The Lights Again.."
21. "Moth to a Flame (Remix)"
22. "Heaven Takes You Home" / "Graveyard (Axwell Remix)" / "Sweet Disposition (Axwell & Dirty South Remix)"
23. "Don't You Worry Child" / "For You" / "Save The World"

=== Additional notes ===
- Starting on August 26 with the show in Dallas, Swedish House Mafia performed "Knas" alongside "Sacrifice (Remix)".
- Starting on September 2 with the show in Las Vegas, an unreleased song called "Dreams" was added to the set list . "Moth to a Flame" also started being played in its original form, and "Phunk" was removed from the set list.
- Starting on September 9 with the show in Los Angeles, "Laktos" was removed from the setlist and was replaced with "Kidsos".
- On the September 17 show in San Francisco, Swedish House Mafia played a collaboration with Alicia Keys titled "Finally" after "Turn On The Lights again..".
- On the October 2 show in London, Swedish House Mafia was joined by Tinie Tempah to perform "Miami 2 Ibiza" and Connie Constance to perform "Heaven Takes You Home". "Heart Is King" was also added to the set list alongside "Sacrifice (Remix)" and "Knas", and "Suffocate" was removed from the set list.

== Tour dates ==
List of concerts, showing date, city, country, venue and opening act
Date	City	Country	Venue	Opening acts
North America
July 29, 2022	Miami	United States	FTX Arena	Grimes; Chloé Caillet
August 3, 2022	New York City	United States	Madison Square Garden (Note: Originally supposed to be held at the MetLife Stadium in East Rutherford.)	ZHU; Chloé Caillet
August 5, 2022	Toronto	Canada	Scotiabank Arena	ZHU; J. Worra
August 7, 2022	Montreal	Canada	Parc Jean-Drapeau (Note: This concert is part of ÎleSoniq Music Festival.)	—
August 13, 2022	Chicago	United States	United Center	Salvatore Ganacci; Monki
August 21, 2022	Denver	United States	Ball Arena	Salvatore Ganacci; J. Worra
August 25, 2022	Austin	United States	Moody Center	Grimes; J. Worra
August 26, 2022	Dallas	United States	American Airlines Center	ZHU; J. Worra
August 27, 2022	Houston	United States	Toyota Center	ZHU; J. Worra
September 2, 2022	Las Vegas	United States	T-Mobile Arena	Moojo; Marc Stout
September 4, 2022	San Diego	United States	Viejas Arena	ZHU; J. Worra
September 9, 2022	Los Angeles	United States	Banc of California Stadium	ZHU
September 13, 2022	Vancouver	Canada	Rogers Arena	ZHU; DJ Holographic
September 14, 2022	Seattle	United States	Climate Pledge Arena	ZHU; DJ Holographic
September 16, 2022	San Francisco	United States	Chase Center	Vintage Culture; DJ Holographic
September 17, 2022	San Francisco	United States	Chase Center	ZHU; DJ Holographic
Europe
September 29, 2022	Manchester	United Kingdom	AO Arena	ZHU; Danny Howard
September 30, 2022	Glasgow	United Kingdom	OVO Hydro	ZHU; N0sefin
October 2, 2022	London	United Kingdom	The O2 Arena	ZHU; Danny Howard
October 6, 2022	Dublin	Ireland	3Arena	ZHU; Danny Howard
October 8, 2022	Birmingham	United Kingdom	Utilita Arena Birmingham	Danny Howard; Moojo
October 10, 2022	Paris	France	Accor Arena	Vintage Culture; Moojo
October 14, 2022	Madrid	Spain	IFEMA	Vintage Culture; Brian Cross
October 15, 2022	Lisbon	Portugal	Altice Arena	Vintage Culture
October 18, 2022	Milan	Italy	Mediolanum Forum	Vintage Culture; Andrea Oliva
October 29, 2022	Antwerp	Belgium	Sportpaleis	Salvatore Ganacci
October 31, 2022	Amsterdam	Netherlands	Ziggo Dome	Salvatore Ganacci
November 9, 2022	Copenhagen	Denmark	Royal Arena	Moojo
November 11, 2022	Oslo	Norway	Telenor Arena	Moojo

== Cancelled shows ==
List of cancelled concerts, showing date, city, country, venue and reason for cancellation
Date	City	Country	Venue	Reason
July 31, 2022	Orlando	United States	Amway Center	Unknown
August 2, 2022	New York City	United States	Madison Square Garden	Unknown
August 9, 2022	Boston	United States	TD Garden	Unknown
August 10, 2022	Philadelphia	United States	Wells Fargo Center	Unknown
August 11, 2022	Washington, D.C.	United States	Capital One Arena	Unknown
August 17, 2022	Detroit	United States	Little Caesars Arena	Unknown
August 19, 2022	Saint Paul	United States	Xcel Energy Center	Unknown
August 30, 2022	Phoenix	United States	Footprint Center	Unknown
October 19, 2022	Zürich	Switzerland	Hallenstadion	Equipment damage
October 21, 2022	Kraków	Poland	Tauron Arena	Equipment damage
October 22, 2022	Prague	Czech Republic	O2 Arena	Equipment damage
October 25, 2022	Cologne	Germany	Lanxess Arena	Equipment damage
October 27, 2022	Munich	Germany	Olympiahalle	Equipment damage
November 3, 2022	Vienna	Austria	Wiener Stadthalle	Unknown
November 5, 2022	Frankfurt	Germany	Festhalle	Unknown
November 6, 2022	Berlin	Germany	Mercedes-Benz Arena	Unknown
November 8, 2022	Hamburg	Germany	Barclays Arena	Unknown
November 13, 2022	Tampere	Finland	Nokia Arena	Unknown

== Controversies ==
=== Cancellations and ticket sale rumors ===
A few days before the tour began, multiple US dates were cancelled, specifically, Orlando, a second date at MSG, Boston, Washington DC, New Jersey, Saint Paul, Phoenix and Detroit. A lot of speculation about low ticket sales was given as the reason, however, this was later debunked by the fact that both the opening shows sold out. The cancellations were reportedly due to the economic situation and inflation - beyond the group's control.
