= Save the World Reunion Tour =

2019 concert tour by Swedish House Mafia

- World tour by Swedish House Mafia
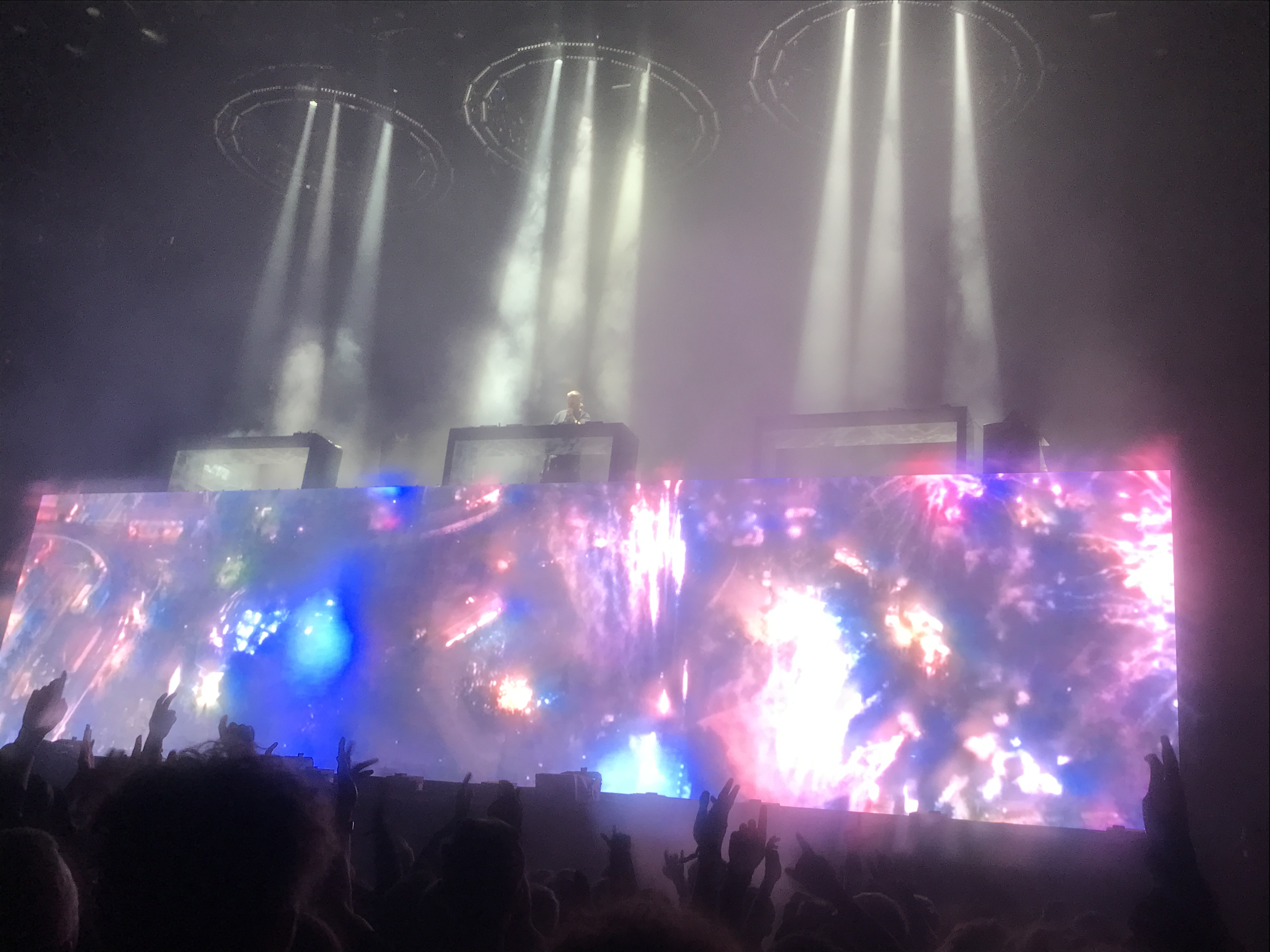
- Start date: 2 May 2019
- End date: 20 September 2019
- Legs: 5
- No. of shows: 16

Swedish House Mafia concert chronology
- One Last Tour (2012–13); Save the World Reunion Tour (2019); Paradise Again World Tour (2022)

The Save the World Reunion Tour is a 2019 reunion tour by Swedish supergroup Swedish House Mafia. Named after their 2011 single, the tour was a follow-up to the group's reunion at Ultra Miami in 2018.

After months of speculation, the tour was teased by Axwell Λ Ingrosso during a show in New York on May 27, 2018, and was confirmed by Steve Angello later in June in an interview with Sydsvenskan. In August 2018, Axwell Λ Ingrosso announced that they'd be going on hiatus to focus on the reunion tour. The tour kicks off at Stockholm's Tele2 Arena on May 2, 2019. On the first night of the tour, Swedish House Mafia premiered a new orchestral version of their 2010 hit "One". The song was composed by Jacob Mühlrad and would be one of the main songs of the tour. The "One Symphony" will be released on New Years Day 2022.

== Buildup ==
In October 2018, a timer appeared on Swedish House Mafia's official website which was set to end on October 22. That day the group held a press conference which they revealed that a worldwide tour would occur the following year and their first stop would be Stockholm's Tele2 Arena. The one night event was upgraded to three the following week due to high demand. In November, billboards located in Mexico City teased a show in the city, at the end of a second timer, the group announced they would play at Foro Sol on May 18. At the end of the month, following another successive timer and billboards appearing in respective cities, Swedish House Mafia announced they would play Tinderbox, Stavernfestivalen, Frequency Festival, and Creamfields as part of their tour, whilst February 2019 saw Ultra Europe, Ultra Korea, and Lollapalooza added to the list. On April 10, 2019, it was announced that Swedish House Mafia would close the world's biggest EDM festival, Tomorrowland, during the summer of that year, with the group also announcing a one-day residency, the preceding Friday, at Ibiza's Ushuaïa night club as part of their tour. Two days before the opening show, pilots of Scandinavian Airlines when on strike over pay. This affected a higher estimated of 35,000 of the 120,000 attending the Tele2 Arena over the three days. Despite this, 43,000 people attended the Tele2 Arena and watched their first show in since Ultra Miami 2018.

Two new IDs were played, supporting the promise of new music. The first was their set opener, "It Gets Better". In July 2021, a "radically revised version" of the track became the trio's first release since reuniting, and the first single off their album, Paradise Again. The second, with the working title "Underneath it All", remains unreleased. Until the group members Axwell released 2 songs "It Gets Better (2019 Version)" in November 2021 and "Underneath it All" in July 2022 via Dropbox

== Tour dates ==
Date	City	Country	Venue	Special guests	Spectators
Europe
2 May 2019	Stockholm	Sweden	Tele2 Arena	Vargas & Lagola, Jarami	115,000
3 May 2019	Stockholm	Sweden	Tele2 Arena	Vargas & Lagola, Jarami	115,000
4 May 2019	Stockholm	Sweden	Tele2 Arena	Vargas & Lagola, Jarami	115,000
North America
18 May 2019	Mexico City	Mexico	Foro Sol	Pauza, Leon Leiden	50,000
Asia
~~9 June 2019~~ Cancelled	Seoul	South Korea	Ultra Korea	None	—
Europe
29 June 2019	Odense	Denmark	Tinderbox	None	40,000
6 July 2019	Gdynia	Poland	Open'er Festival	None	50,000
12 July 2019	Stavern	Norway	Stavernfestivalen	None	40,000
14 July 2019	Split	Croatia	Ultra Europe	None	60,000
~~20 July 2019~~ Cancelled	Helsinki	Finland	Weekend Festival	None	—
26 July 2019	Ibiza	Spain	Ushuaïa	None	?
16 August 2019	St. Pölten	Austria	Frequency Festival	None	?
23 August 2019	Zürich	Switzerland	Open Air	None	?
25 August 2019	Daresbury	United Kingdom	Creamfields	None	80,000
7 September 2019	Berlin	Germany	Lollapalooza	None	?
Asia
20 September 2019	Singapore		Singapore Grand Prix	None	45,000

== Setlist ==
Swedish House Mafia's set as of their first show, at Stockholm's Tele2 Arena on May 2, 2019.

1. ID ("It Gets Better")
2. "We Come, We Rave, We Love" / "Out of My Mind"
3. "Jack U" / "555" / "Greyhound"
4. "Dream Bigger"
5. "Dark River" / "Sweet Disposition"
6. "Laktos" / "Calling (Lose My Mind)"
7. "For Sale" / "On My Way"
8. "Leave the World Behind" / "Cobra"
9. "Rushin'" / "Raise Your Hands" / "Flash" / "In the Air" (Axwell Remix)
10. "Be" / "Show Me Love" / "Knas"
11. "Teasing Mr Charlie" / "How Do You Feel Right Now"
12. ID ("Underneath It All")
13. "Miami 2 Ibiza" (Intro Edit) / "How Do You Feel Right Now"
14. "Resurrection" (Axwell Mix) / "Something New"
15. "This Time"
16. "Antidote" / "Antidote" (Salvatore Ganacci Remix)
17. "Payback" / "Dreamer" / "Love Inc" / "In My Mind" (Axwell Mix)
18. "Barricade"
19. "More Than You Know"
20. "Remember"
21. "Heart is King" / "Reload" / "Tell Me Why"
22. "The Island Pt. 1" (Steve Angello, AN21, & Max Vangeli Remix)
23. "One" / "One Symphony"
24. "Can't Hold Us Down"
25. "Stairway to Heaven" / "Don't You Worry Child" / "Sun Is Shining"
26. "Save the World" (NC Edit) / "Save the World"

The same setlist was also used during the show at Foro Sol, Mexico City, and remained similar throughout the tour.

Alternate Setlists

- A new reworked version of "For Sale" was premiered at Open'er Festival on July 6.
- Swedish House Mafia debuted a new track featuring A$AP Rocky, titled "Frankenstein", during their Ultra Europe performance. The song was then released on Paradise Again.

== Critical reception ==
In an article about the first two shows at the Tele2 Arena, British EDM and Clubbing magazine Mixmag described the "long-awaited" reunion as a "historic comeback show" and that "Swedish House Mafia's climactic return to dance music" "[brought] nostalgia" to the "tens of thousands of people" who watched a show with good balance of promised new music and "many of the classics". The reunion was met with "deafening cheers" from the fans.

The show at Foro Sol was described by fellow EDM magazine Groove Cartel, as "another great show of the monumental tour", and EDM.com describing it as a "jaw-dropping production".

Following their performance at Open'er Festival, Swedish House Mafia received criticism for their tour; with EDM magazine Your EDM saying the tour relied too much on nostalgia for ticket sales as supposed to anything new. The magazine however praised the show saying the "epic" performance was "as sweet as ever".

The highly anticipated Creamfields performance was sold out to an 80,000 strong crowd. However the show was overshadowed by another "mystery date"—typical of the tour. The date was scheduled for 6 September, the day before Lollapalooza, where they are to perform. The leading hypothesis is that the date is the day where new music is to be released in accordance with Pop culture's "NewMusicFriday". However the date turned out to be a give away for 33 life time passes to all future Swedish House Mafia shows.

The tour ended with Swedish House Mafia opening the 2019 Singapore Grand Prix to a crowd of 45,000 people. The show was typical of their open air performances throughout the tour with a show dominated by pyrotechnics and lasers. The show, being their first in Asia since One Last Tour, was full of their usual hits with Axwell describing the crowd as "the best in Asia".

== Controversies ==
=== Cancellation rumours ===
Following the cancellation of their set at Ultra Korea, it was reported that most of the rest of the tour could be cancelled. The reasoning for this was due to a new deal that Swedish House Mafia had signed with Live Nation Entertainment; one of the clauses of new deal would allegedly prevent the group from playing any future shows which did not benefit Live Nation. However the new deal would supposedly enable Swedish House Mafia to undergo a full stadium tour later in the year, allowing for their own production and advertisement. However Steve Angello was quick to suggest that these reports were all fake.

=== Merchandise ===
The official tour merchandise sales came into question when new merchandise was released following Open'er Festival. The new items were criticised for their closer resemblance to that of an 80's metal band rather than anything electronic. This lead many to claim that the merchandise was simply a way of generating money rather that to act as a memento to the tour.

=== Stage damage ===
The finale of the group's Creamfields performance contained a large pyrotechnics display. Following the end of the festival it was claimed by a member of the festival's social media group that the display caused around £4,000,000 in damage to the Arc Stage. However, the true cause of the damage is yet to be determined.

=== Tomorrowland ===
Although not a scheduled tour date there were many rumours that Swedish House Mafia would close Tomorrowland 2019, especially after Steve Angello claimed in the Autumn of the previous year that the group would play at the festival "by any means necessary". As the festival drew closer no official announcement was made but the evidence suggesting a surprise performance grew even stronger with the group's signature "three dots" appearing on the Tomorrowland lineup. However the "three dots" were announced last minute to be for 3 Are Legend (Dimitri Vegas & Like Mike and Steve Aoki) leading many fans to believe that Swedish House Mafia cancelled last minute as they did with Ultra Korea and Weekend Festival. Despite this Axwell and Steve Angello both claim that the group never was booked for the festival. Despite this, British trance DJ Gareth Emery claimed that the group were to play the show in a statement about his Tomorrowland set, with him suggesting a disagreement over stage design was the reason for their supposed cancellation.
