= 3 Are Legend =

Music trio

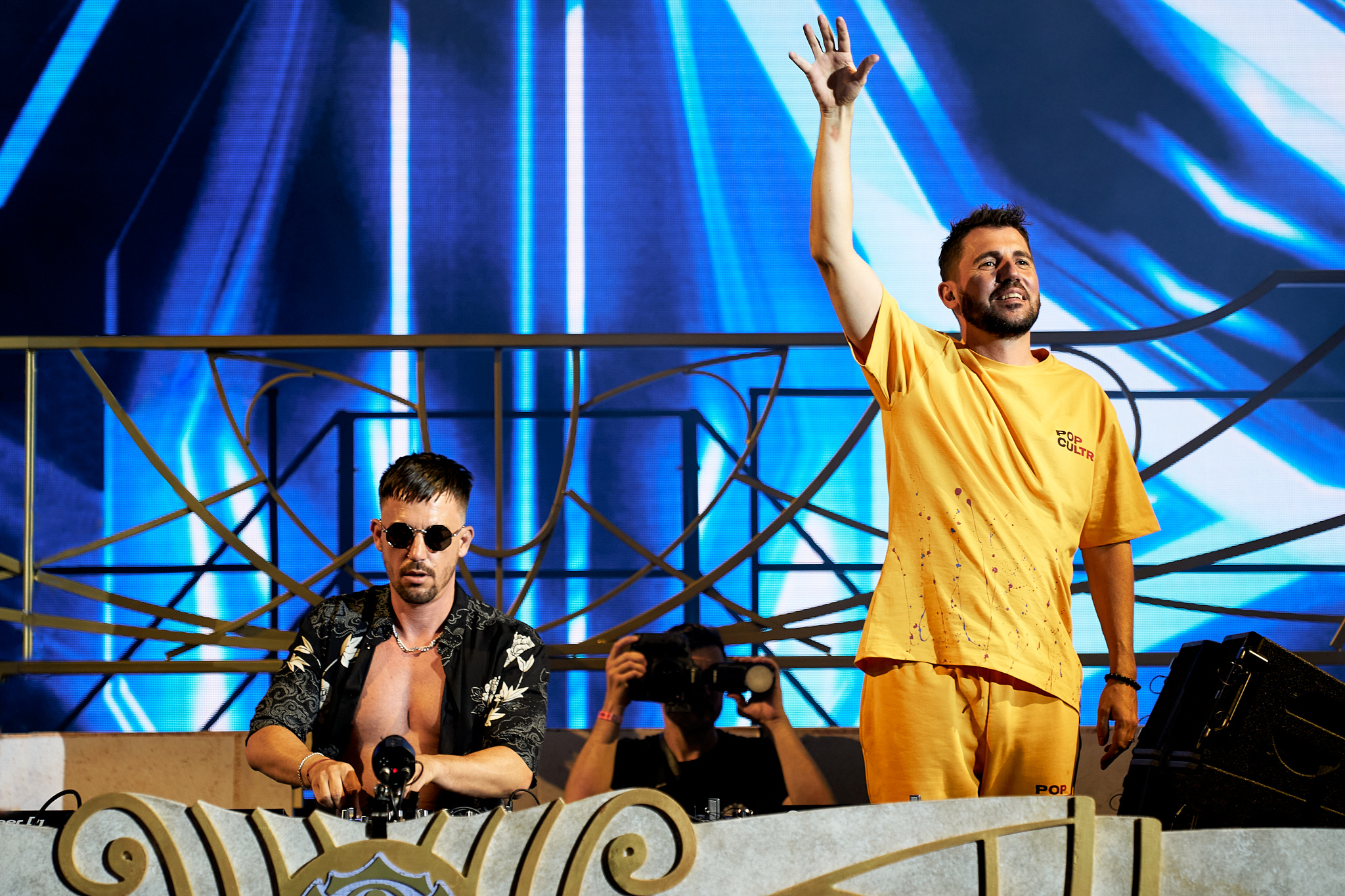
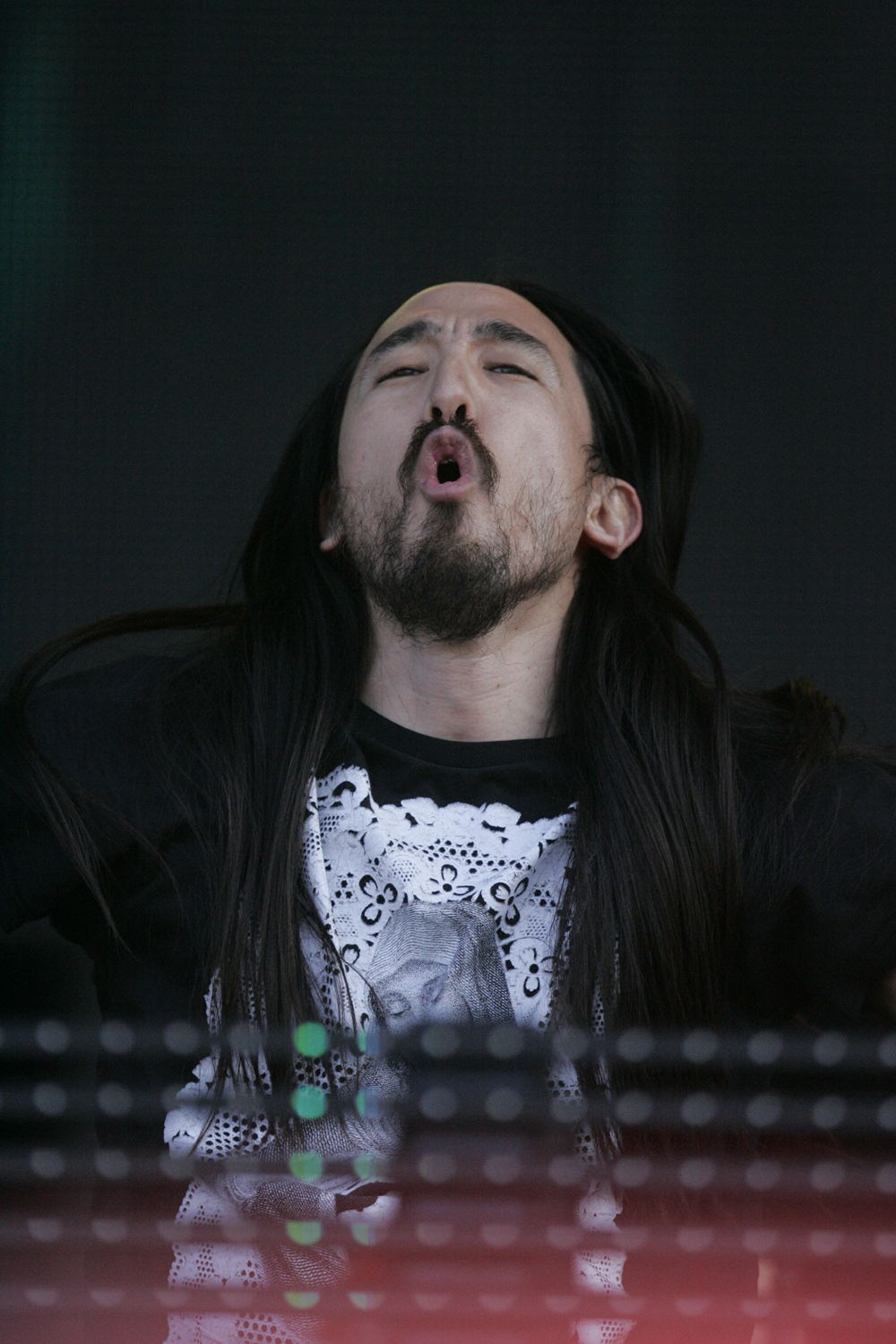
- The members of 3 Are Legend: Dimitri Vegas & Like Mike and Steve Aoki

Background information
- Occupations: DJs, musicians
- Years active: 2018–present
- Members: Steve Aoki; Dimitri Vegas; Like Mike

3 Are Legend is an electronic dance music supergroup consisting of Belgian Greek DJs Dimitri Vegas & Like Mike and American DJ Steve Aoki.

== Background and career ==
3 Are Legend are a supergroup founded by the three DJs who are described as good friends. Dimitri Vegas, Like Mike and Steve Aoki regularly perform at festivals and concerts together, including headlining several major music festivals such as TomorrowWorld, Tomorrowland, Creamfields and Ultra Music Festival, which prompted the formation of the group. The trio's first use of the name came during Ultra 2014, but had previously played together for many years previously.

On July 26, 2019, the super group released a track with W&W named Khaleesi. Two days later the trio closed Tomorrowland for the first time, and on the festival's 15th anniversary. This came after they were inadvertently caught up in a controversy involving fellow supergroup Swedish House Mafia regarding the event's closure aimed unexpected cancellations of a few of the latter's 2019 tour dates.

== Discography ==
=== Singles ===
Title	Year	Album
"Khalessi" (with W&W)	2019	Non-album singles
"Rave Dome" (with Justin Prime and Sandro Silva)	2020	Non-album singles
"Deck the Halls" (with Toneshifterz and Brennan Heart) (Timmy Trumpet Edit)	2020	Home Alone (On the Night Before Christmas) EP
"Pump It Up" (with Tujamo and Jaxx & Vega featuring Black & White Brothers)	2022	Non-album single
"Name of Your DJ (3 Are Legend Edit)" (with Quintino featuring MC Ambush)	2022	Non-album single
"Nasty" (with Blasterjaxx)	2023	Non-album single

=== Remixes ===
- 2018: Dimitri Vegas & Like Mike vs. W&W — Crowd Control (3 Are Legend Remix) [Smash The House]
- 2023: Dimitri Vegas & Like Mike X David Guetta X Afro Bros - She Knows (3 Are Legend X MANDY Remix)[Smash The House]
- 2024: Steve Aoki & AutoErotique vs. Dimitri Vegas & Like Mike - Feedback (3 Are Legend & Stephen Hurtley Remix)[Dim Mak]

=== Previous collaborations ===
- 2012: Steve Aoki and Angger Dimas vs. Dimitri Vegas & Like Mike — Phat Brahms [Dim Mak]
- 2014: Steve Aoki and Autoerotique vs. Dimitri Vegas & Like Mike — Feedback [Dim Mak]
- 2016: Dimitri Vegas & Like Mike and Steve Aoki vs. Ummet Ozcan — Melody [Smash The House]
- 2017: Dimitri Vegas & Like Mike vs. Steve Aoki — We Are Legend [Self-released, original song made as a demo by Martin Garrix "legend" ]
