= Connie Constance =

English singer and songwriter

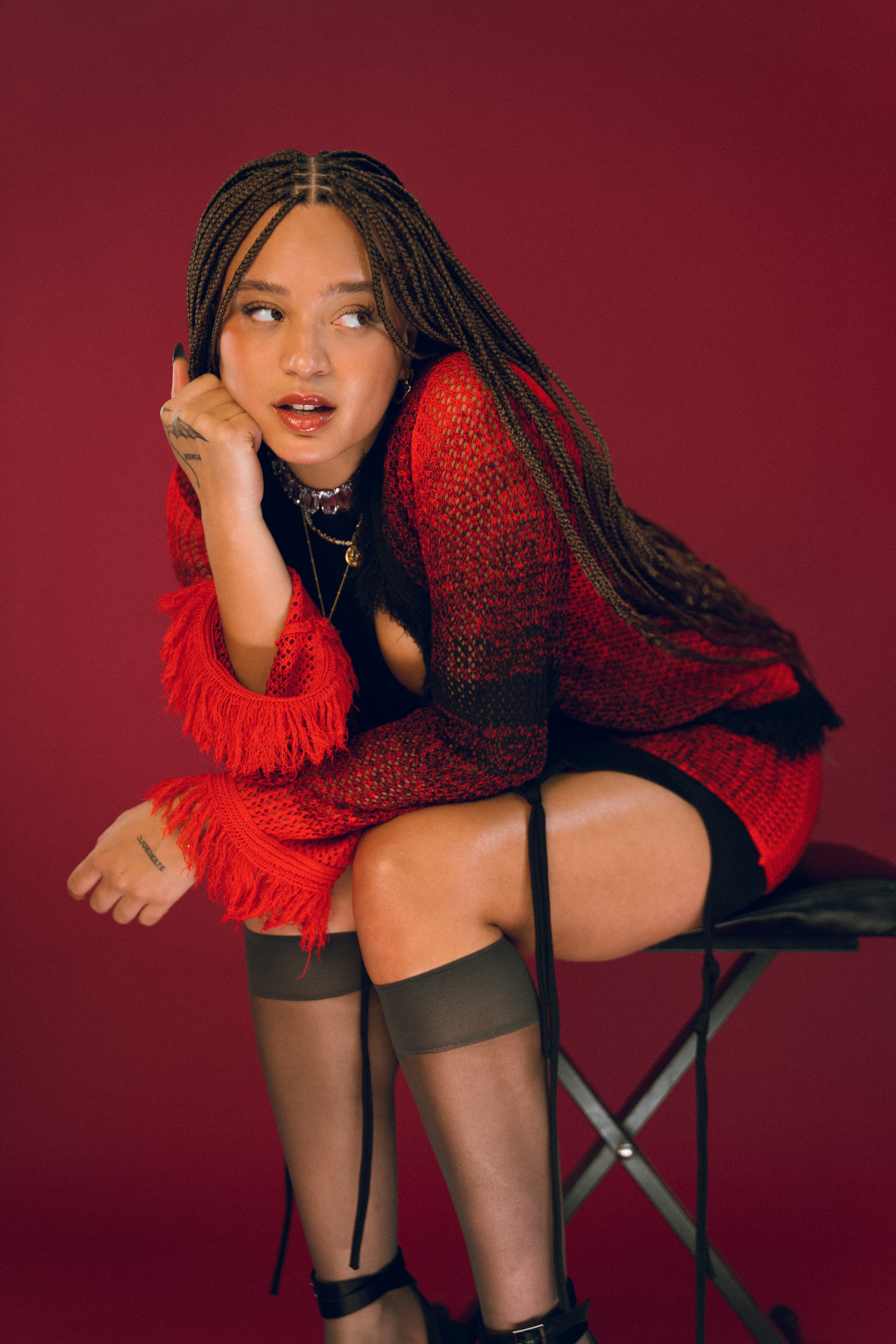

Background information
- Born: Constance Power; Watford, England
- Genres: Alternative, Indie-Pop, Indie-Rock, Pop
- Occupations: Singer, songwriter
- Years active: 2015–present
- Label: AMF Records

Constance Power (born 1995), known professionally as Connie Constance, is an English singer and songwriter. She released her debut album, English Rose, on 21 March 2019, followed by Miss Power in 2022.

== Biography ==
Constance grew up listening to bands like The Smiths, The Stone Roses, Arctic Monkeys and Blur. She trained as a dancer and was accepted to the Urdang Academy. After leaving the school in 2014, she worked with producer Kwes Darko, releasing her debut EP, 'In The Grass' in 2015.

Constance's debut album English Rose was released on 22 March 2019. Reviewing, Pitchfork noted that "Constance’s voice takes on scratchy, sonorous depth that brings to mind the subterranean soul of fellow London artists Nilüfer Yanya and King Krule." Clash noted that her songs have been described as 'indie-soul'. The BBC described her as a "rising UK pop star". The album is produced by Jim Abbiss.

In May 2019, she performed at The Great Escape Festival in Brighton.

She released the single ‘Monty Python’ in 2020 on Jump The Fence records, departing from the RnB and Soul influences of 2019’s English Rose and embracing her indie-rock influences instead.

Following this, Constance released ‘The Butterfly Club – EP’ later in 2020, releasing ‘James’ and ‘Costa Del Margate’ as singles. ‘Prim & Propa – EP’ followed in 2021, with ‘Electric Girl’ being the lead single.

In August 2022, Connie Constance featured on Clara Amfo’s BBC Radio 1 show ‘Future Sounds’. The show broadcast a recording of a live session from Maida Vale Studios, where she was joined by her live band. Constance performed ‘Miss Power’ and ‘’Til The World’s Awake’, as well as a cover of Helicopter by Bloc Party.

In November 2022, she released her sophomore album, ‘Miss Power’, on Play It Again Sam records. The album was produced by Karma Kid and sees Constance embrace a more indie, guitar based sound. Constance has described the album as ‘uptempo indie bangers’, as well as having more vulnerable moments, described by her as ‘folky indie soul’. ‘Miss Power’ was the lead single from the album. ‘’Til The World’s Awake’ and ‘Mood Hoover’ were the following 2 tracks released from the album. The last song to be released prior to the album, ‘Hurt You’, was written about Constance’s experience about being signed to a major label, and realising the people she was working with didn’t have her best interests at heart. Constance has spoken about being encouraged to make RnB music rather than the guitar-driven, indie music she gravitated towards. She has also said that it is her aim to ‘make it the norm for Black and mixed-race people to make alternative music – it shouldn’t even be a thing’.

The album was positively reviewed by the NME, Gal Dem, Far Out, Line of Best Fit, Clash, and DIY.

Constance also featured on the Swedish House Mafia song ‘Heaven Takes You Home’, from their 2022 album Paradise Again, and performed with them at their show at the O2 Arena in London in October 2022. In March 2023, she released a version of the track 'Kamikaze' featuring Sleaford Mods frontman Jason Williamson. In 2023 she recorded a vocal for the track "Marilyn", by the British rapper Casisdead, for his debut album, Famous Last Words.

== Discography ==
=== Studio albums ===
- 2019 – English Rose
- 2022 – Miss Power

=== Extended Plays ===
- 2020 – ‘’The Butterfly Club’’
- 2021 – ‘’Prim & Propa’’

=== Singles ===
- 2015 – ‘’In The Grass’’
- 2015 – ‘’Answer’’
- 2016 – ‘’Lose My Mind’’
- 2016 – ‘’Clouds’’
- 2017 – ‘’Boring Connie’’
- 2018 – ‘’Yesterday’’
- 2018 – ‘’Fast Cars’’
- 2020 – ‘’Monty Python’’
- 2020 – ‘’James’’
- 2020 – ‘’Costa del Margate’’
- 2021 – ‘’Electric Girl
- 2022 – ‘’Miss Power’’
