= One Last Tour =

2012–13 concert tour by Swedish House Mafia

- World tour by Swedish House Mafia
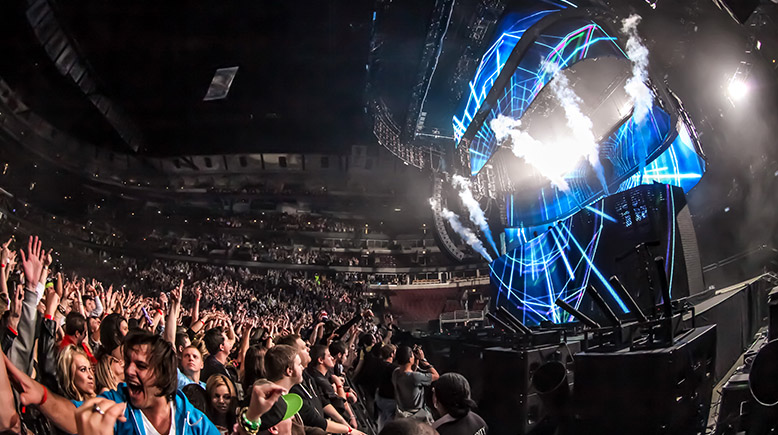
- Associated album: Until Now
- Start date: 16 November 2012
- End date: 24 March 2013
- Legs: 7
- No. of shows: 52

Swedish House Mafia concert chronology
- Take One Tour (2009–10); One Last Tour (2012–13); Save the World Reunion Tour (2019)

The One Last Tour was a worldwide farewell tour by Swedish electronic dance trio Swedish House Mafia following the announcement of their break-up in June 2012. The tour took place through November 2012 to March 2013.

== Itinerary ==
On September 24, 2012, Swedish House Mafia announced the dates for their farewell tour appropriately named "One Last Tour". The tour kicked off in November 2012 and concluded in March 2013. The tour was taken across the world with the group performing in Russia, India, and South Africa for the first time. Tickets sold out in minutes and due to extremely high demand, additional shows were added. Part of the tour saw the trio play three nights at Stockholm's Friends Arena, performing to over 100,000 people across the three nights of November 2012. This marked their first and only performances on Swedish soil.

The group performed five shows in New York City, with the first at the Hammerstein Ballroom known as the "Black Tie Rave"—a charity event with a formal dress code in support of Hurricane Sandy relief and Save the Children.

Due to extremely high demand, additional shows were added, and the group made their final appearance at the Ultra Music Festival. On night one, Friday 15 March, they were the opening acts and on the final night, Sunday 24 March 24, they closed the show ending with the phrase "We Came, We Raved, We Loved" appearing on screen, which became the mantra of the whole tour. During this performance frequent collaborator John Martin joined the trio on stage to give his farewells and performed their songs "Save the World" and "Don't You Worry Child" which ended in a huge crowd singalong which Billboard described as "a powerful ending [for the] three-DJ Juggernauts".

== Tour dates ==
Date	City	Country	Venue
Asia
16 November 2012	Dubai	United Arab Emirates	Dubai World Trade Centre
18 November 2012	Delhi	India	Sunburn Arena
Europe
22 November 2012	Stockholm	Sweden	Friends Arena
23 November 2012	Stockholm	Sweden	Friends Arena
24 November 2012	Stockholm	Sweden	Friends Arena
26 November 2012	Copenhagen	Denmark	Forum Copenhagen
29 November 2012	Prague	Czech Republic	O_{2} Arena
30 November 2012	Schladming	Austria	WM Park Planai
1 December 2012	Antwerp	Belgium	Sportpaleis
6 December 2012	Frankfurt	Germany	Festhalle Frankfurt
7 December 2012	Amsterdam	Netherlands	Ziggo Dome
8 December 2012	Paris	France	Palais Omnisports de Paris-Bercy
12 December 2012	Amsterdam	Netherlands	Ziggo Dome
13 December 2012	Amsterdam	Netherlands	Ziggo Dome
14 December 2012	Bucharest	Romania	Romexpo
15 December 2012	Moscow	Russia	Stadium Live
18 December 2012	Lisbon	Portugal	Pavilhão Atlântico
20 December 2012	Helsinki	Finland	Hartwall Areena
22 December 2012	Oslo	Norway	Telenor Arena
Asia
16 January 2013	Pasay	Philippines	Mall of Asia Arena
17 January 2013	Singapore		Singapore Indoor Stadium
18 January 2013	Kuala Lumpur	Malaysia	Sunway Lagoon
19 January 2013	Jakarta	Indonesia	Ancol Eco Park
20 January 2013	Bangalore	India	Sunburn Arena
22 January 2013	Mumbai	India	Sunburn Arena
Africa
25 January 2013	Johannesburg	South Africa	Nasrec Centre
26 January 2013	Johannesburg	South Africa	Nasrec Centre
27 January 2013	Cape Town	South Africa	Ostrich Farm
Oceania
30 January 2013	Melbourne	Australia	Sidney Myer Music Bowl
31 January 2013	Melbourne	Australia	Sidney Myer Music Bowl
1 February 2013	Melbourne	Australia	Sidney Myer Music Bowl
2 February 2013	Sydney	Australia	Sydney Showgrounds
Latin America
8 February 2013	Guadalajara	Mexico	Foro Alterno
9 February 2013	Mexico City	Mexico	Foro Sol
North America
13 February 2013	San Francisco	United States	Bill Graham Civic Auditorium
14 February 2013	San Francisco	United States	Bill Graham Civic Auditorium
15 February 2013	San Francisco	United States	Bill Graham Civic Auditorium
16 February 2013	San Francisco	United States	Bill Graham Civic Auditorium
17 February 2013	San Francisco	United States	Bill Graham Civic Auditorium
20 February 2013	Chicago	United States	United Center
22 February 2013	Toronto	Canada	Rogers Centre
23 February 2013	Toronto	Canada	Rogers Centre
27 February 2013	Montreal	Canada	Bell Centre
28 February 2013	New York City	United States	Hammerstein Ballroom
1 March 2013	New York City	United States	Madison Square Garden
2 March 2013	Brooklyn	United States	Barclays Center
3 March 2013	Brooklyn	United States	Barclays Center
4 March 2013	Brooklyn	United States	Barclays Center
8 March 2013	Los Angeles	United States	Los Angeles State Historic Park
9 March 2013	Los Angeles	United States	Los Angeles State Historic Park
15 March 2013	Miami	United States	Ultra Music Festival
24 March 2013	Miami	United States	Ultra Music Festival

=== Box office score data ===
Venue	City	Tickets Sold / Available	Gross Revenue
Sportpaleis	Antwerp	19,698 / 19,698 (100%)	$1,134,170
Foro Alterno	Guadalajara	9,754 / 9,754 (100%)	$589,594
Foro Sol	Mexico City	36,657 / 36,657 (100%)	$2,524,748
Bill Graham Civic Auditorium	San Francisco	43,858 / 43,858 (100%)	$2,850,830
Bell Centre	Montreal	13,324 / 13,324 (100%)	$1,029,000
Madison Square Garden	New York City	14,076 / 14,076 (100%)	$1,074,015
Barclays Center	Brooklyn	42,645 / 42,645 (100%)	$2,743,383
TOTAL (for the concerts listed)		180,012 / 180,012 (100%)	$11,945,740
