= Memento Mori (radio show) =

Radio show hosted by the Weeknd

- Genre: Music
- Running time: 2–3 hours
- Home station: Apple Music 1
- Syndicates: XO
- Hosted by: The Weeknd and various guests
- Created by: The Weeknd
- Original release: June 8, 2018
- No. of episodes: 22
- Website: Official website

Memento Mori (stylized in all caps) is an Apple Music 1 radio show created by Canadian singer The Weeknd. Syndicated through his record label XO, the show began airing on June 8, 2018. Throughout the show, the Weeknd plays a mixture of songs that have inspired him during his album-making process. He also invites various guests to host their own episode and share their curated playlists.

== History ==
=== 2018–2019: First episodes ===
The Weeknd announced his radio show Memento Mori on June 6, 2018, through social media. The first episode aired on June 8. At the time of its broadcast, the Weeknd was living in Paris, and played songs that were inspired by "some very memorable nights." The second episode aired on August 23, over two months after the debut broadcast.

The third episode aired on January 10, 2019, and was hosted by producer Gesaffelstein. During the broadcast, Gesaffelstein premiered their song "Lost in the Fire", which served as the second single from his second studio album Hyperion. When the episode aired, the Weeknd was living in New York City and was working on his fourth studio album. The fourth episode aired on February 16, the Weeknd's 29th birthday. The broadcast was hosted by his then-girlfriend, model Bella Hadid.

The fifth episode aired on April 27, 2019, and was hosted by the Weeknd's co-manager Cash. During the episode, he premiered songs from rappers 21 Savage, Offset and Travis Scott. The sixth episode, and the show's first Halloween edition, aired on October 31. It was hosted by DJ Kerwin Frost.

=== 2019–2020: After Hours campaign ===
The Weeknd hosted the seventh episode on November 26, 2019, amid anticipation for new music. During the episode, he premiered his song "Heartless", the lead single from his fourth studio album After Hours (2020). The eighth episode aired on March 20, 2020, to celebrate After Hours' release. The ninth episode, a special edition dedicated to the Weeknd's debut studio album Kiss Land (2013), aired on August 13. During the episode, he played the songs that inspired Kiss Land, as well as unreleased songs that didn't make the album, including a collaboration with singer-songwriter Lana Del Rey. The tenth episode, and the second Halloween edition, aired on October 31. It was hosted by musician Oneohtrix Point Never.

The eleventh episode aired on November 5, 2020, and was hosted by rapper Nav in celebration of the release of his second mixtape Emergency Tsunami. The twelfth episode, a special Christmas edition, aired on December 18. The thirteenth episode aired on January 6, 2021.

=== 2021–2022: Dawn FM campaign ===
The fourteenth episode aired on August 5, 2021, to celebrate the release of the Weeknd's song "Take My Breath", the lead single from his upcoming fifth studio album, Dawn FM. The fifteenth episode aired on August 11. During the episode, the Weeknd shared a couple of songs that inspired his upcoming album, including the songs "Toxic" and "Everytime" by singer Britney Spears. The sixteenth episode, celebrating the tenth anniversary of the release of the Weeknd's second mixtape Thursday (2011), aired on August 18. The seventeenth episode aired on August 27, and was hosted by rapper Belly in celebration of the release of his third studio album See You Next Wednesday.

The eighteenth episode aired on October 4. During the episode, the Weeknd announced that his upcoming album is complete and that he was waiting on a "couple characters that are key to the narrative". He also revealed during the episode that he will be featured in a couple of songs that will arrive prior to the album's release. The nineteenth episode aired on October 14, and was hosted by the Weeknd's best friend and creative director La Mar Taylor. The twentieth episode aired on October 28, and was hosted by house music supergroup Swedish House Mafia. During the episode, the group premiered their collaboration song with the Weeknd "Moth to a Flame", the third single from their upcoming debut studio album Paradise Again. The twenty-first episode, and the third Halloween edition, aired on October 31. It was hosted by producer Mike Dean. The twenty-second episode aired on November 19. It was hosted by singer-songwriter Rosalía.
