= Paradise Again =

Studio album by Swedish House Mafia
- Released: 15 April 2022
- Recorded: 2019–2022
- Genres: House; techno; ambient; hip hop
- Length: 60:02
- Labels: SSA; Republic
- Producers: Desembra; Dice of Nights; Fred Again; Jacob Mühlrad; Kelvin Krash; Killen Manjaro; Klahr; Lord Flacko; Magnus Lidehäll; Parisi; Swedish House Mafia; Vargas & Lagola

Swedish House Mafia chronology
The Singles (2013)	Paradise Again (2022)

Singles from Paradise Again
- 1. "It Gets Better" Released: 15 July 2021; 2. "Lifetime" Released: 19 July 2021; 3. "Moth to a Flame" Released: 22 October 2021; 4. "Redlight" Released: 25 February 2022; 5. "Heaven Takes You Home" Released: 15 April 2022

Paradise Again is the debut studio album by Swedish house music supergroup Swedish House Mafia, released on 15 April 2022, through SSA Recording and Republic Records. It is their third overall album after the two compilations Until One (2010) and Until Now (2012). Paradise Again features guest appearances from 070 Shake, ASAP Rocky, Connie Constance, Jacob Mühlrad, Mapei, Seinabo Sey, Sting, Ty Dolla Sign, and the Weeknd.

Four singles were released from the album, with the third single "Moth to a Flame", a collaboration with the Weeknd, peaking at number two on Billboard's Hot Dance/Electronic Songs chart. To promote the album, Swedish House Mafia embarked on the Paradise Again World Tour and headlined the Coachella Valley Music and Arts Festival alongside the Weeknd.

== Background ==
Since the day we formed SHM, our dream was to make a studio album, an album that would stand for who we are as individuals and artists. Since our reunion we decided to fulfill our dream, we would embark on a sonic adventure that would take us to a new world, a world of free thoughts, limitless ideas and space for expression. This is us, this is our world, this is Paradise Again.

— Swedish House Mafia

In February 2021, Swedish House Mafia's art director Alexander Wessley and their manager Max Holmstrand shared videos of the supergroup working on new music. One month after the videos were published, the supergroup parted ways with their former record label Columbia Records. In April, the supergroup signed with manager Wassim "Sal" Slaiby, hinting at a potential collaboration with his longtime client the Weeknd. On 15 July, Swedish House Mafia announced that they have signed to Republic Records and that they intended to release their debut studio album, Paradise Again, later that year. Following the announcement, the supergroup released the album's lead single "It Gets Better". On 19 July, the supergroup released the album's second single "Lifetime" with Ty Dolla Sign and 070 Shake. The album's third single "Moth to a Flame" with the Weeknd, was released on 22 October.

On 10 February 2022, Swedish House Mafia announced that they have finished recording Paradise Again. On 3 March, the supergroup released the album's fourth single "Redlight" with Sting, and revealed that Paradise Again is now scheduled to be released on 15 April. The supergroup revealed the album's tracklist on 7 April. On the same day, they revealed the artwork, stating that each particle in the artwork represents "a minute in the life" of the group, marking it as a timeline from the day the group was formed leading up to the album's release.

== Promotion ==
Swedish House Mafia performed a medley of "It Gets Better" and "Lifetime" on the Tonight Show Starring Jimmy Fallon and on the pre-show at the 2021 MTV Video Music Awards. In October 2021, to celebrate the release of "Moth to a Flame", the supergroup hosted the twentieth episode of the Weeknd's Apple Music 1 radio show Memento Mori. The same month, the supergroup announced their first tour in ten years, the Paradise Again World Tour, which is scheduled to commence in July 2022.

In January 2022, Swedish House Mafia was confirmed to headline the Coachella Valley Music and Arts Festival at an unspecified date. In April, ten days before the festival began, the supergroup were announced to be taking over Kanye West's Sunday spot after he dropped out, while also revealing that they would be headlining the show alongside the Weeknd.

== Critical reception ==
Professional ratings
Aggregate scores
Source	Rating
Metacritic	69/100
Review scores
Source	Rating
AllMusic	3.5/5 stars
The Arts Desk	1/5 stars
Clash	5/10
NME	4/5 stars
The Observer	3/5 stars
Pitchfork	6.2/10
Tom Hull	B+

Paradise Again received generally positive reviews from music critics. At Metacritic, which assigns a normalised rating out of 100 to reviews from mainstream publications, the album received an average score of 69 based on five reviews, indicating "generally favorable reviews".

The Groove Cartel commended the album, calling it "a 360° exploration of electronic music". Ali Shutler of NME praised Swedish House Mafia for taking risks "rather than sounding like a vintage group struggling to find their identity" and that the album has the trio "flexing their musical and emotional muscles across 17 brilliant, fearless and often surprising tracks. The kings of dance music are very much back".

== Track listing ==
All tracks are produced by Swedish House Mafia and Desembra, except where noted.

Paradise Again track listing
No.	Title	Writer(s)	Producer(s)	Length
1.	"Time" (featuring Mapei)	Axel Hedfors; Steve Angello; Sebastian Ingrosso; Vincent Pontare; Salem Al Fakir; Dice of Nights; Carl Nordström; Hannes Torssell; Jacqueline Mapei Cummings	Swedish House Mafia; Desembra; Dice of Nights; Killen Manjaro	4:41
2.	"Heaven Takes You Home" (with Connie Constance)	Hedfors; Angello; Ingrosso; Nordström; Connie Constance; Magnus Lidehäll	Swedish House Mafia; Desembra; Klahr; Lidehäll	3:34
3.	"Jacob's Note" (featuring Jacob Mühlrad)	Hedfors; Angello; Ingrosso; Nordström; Jacob Mühlrad	Swedish House Mafia; Mühlrad	1:04
4.	"Moth to a Flame" (with the Weeknd)	Hedfors; Angello; Ingrosso; Nordström; Abel Tesfaye		3:54
5.	"Mafia"	Hedfors; Angello; Ingrosso; Nordström		3:34
6.	"Frankenstein" (with ASAP Rocky)	Hedfors; Angello; Ingrosso; Nordström; Rakim Mayers; Pontare; Al Fakir; Kelvin Krash	Swedish House Mafia; Desembra; Vargas & Lagola; Kelvin Krash; Lord Flacko	3:27
7.	"Don't Go Mad" (featuring Seinabo Sey)	Hedfors; Angello; Ingrosso; Nordström; Seinabo Sey; Lonnie Liston Smith	Swedish House Mafia; Desembra; Klahr	4:24
8.	"Paradise Again"	Hedfors; Angello; Ingrosso; Nordström		3:35
9.	"Lifetime" (featuring Ty Dolla Sign and 070 Shake)	Hedfors; Angello; Ingrosso; Nordström; Mayers; Pontare; Danielle Balbuena; Tyrone Griffin Jr.		3:06
10.	"Calling On"	Hedfors; Angello; Ingrosso; Fred Gibson; Marco Parisi; Giampaolo Parisi; Cassietta George	Swedish House Mafia; Fred Again; Parisi	4:35
11.	"Home"	Hedfors; Angello; Ingrosso; Nordström; Lidehäll; Constance		3:44
12.	"It Gets Better"	Hedfors; Angello; Ingrosso; Nordström; Lidehäll; Al Mack; Lee Hazlewood		3:04
13.	"Redlight" (with Sting)	Hedfors; Angello; Ingrosso; Nordström; GM Sumner		4:02
14.	"Can U Feel It"	Hedfors; Angello; Ingrosso; Nordström		4:23
15.	"19:30"	Hedfors; Angello; Ingrosso; Nordström		1:57
16.	"Another Minute"	Hedfors; Angello; Ingrosso; Nordström; Pontare; Al Fakir; Balbuena	Swedish House Mafia; Desembra; Vargas & Lagola	3:27
17.	"For You"	Hedfors; Angello; Ingrosso; Nordström; Cummings		5:22
Total length:				60:02

Sample credits

- "Don't Go Mad" contains a sample of "Summer Nights", written by Lonnie Liston Smith Jr., as performed by Lonnie Liston Smith and The Cosmic Echoes.
- "Calling On" contains a sample of "In the Garden", written and as performed by Cassietta George.
- "It Gets Better" contains a sample of "Lightning's Girl", written by Lee Hazlewood, as performed by Nancy Sinatra; and a sample of "One More Time", written by Al Mack, as performed by Divas of Color featuring Evelyn "Champagne" King.
- "Redlight" contains an interpolation of "Roxanne", written by Sting, as performed by The Police.

== Personnel ==
Swedish House Mafia

- Axwell – bass guitar, keyboards (tracks 1, 2, 4, 5, 7, 8, 10, 11, 13–15, 17); drums, keyboards, programming (1, 2, 5, 7, 8, 10, 11, 13–15, 17); drum programming (4), engineering (all tracks)
- Steve Angello – bass guitar, keyboards (1, 2, 4, 5, 7, 8, 10, 11, 13–15, 17); drums, programming (1, 2, 5, 7, 8, 10, 11, 13–15, 17); drum programming (4), engineering (all tracks)
- Sebastian Ingrosso – bass guitar, keyboards (1, 2, 4, 5, 7, 8, 10, 11, 13–15, 17); drums, programming (1, 2, 5, 7, 8, 10, 11, 13–15, 17); drum programming (4), engineering (all tracks)

Additional musicians

- Carl Nordström – bass guitar, keyboards (1, 2, 4, 5, 7, 8, 11, 13–15, 17); drums, programming (1, 2, 5, 7, 8, 11, 13–15, 17); drum programming (4)
- Dice of Nights – bass guitar, drums, keyboards, programming (1)
- Killen Manjaro – bass guitar, drums, keyboards, programming (1)
- Johannes Klahr – bass guitar, drums, keyboards, programming (2)
- 070 Shake – vocals (9, 16)
- Ty Dolla Sign – vocals (9)
- Fred Again – bass guitar, drums, keyboards, programming (10)
- Giampaolo Parisi – bass guitar, drums, keyboards, programming (10)
- Marco Parisi – bass guitar, drums, keyboards, programming (10)

Technical

- Jay Reynolds – mastering (1, 10), mixing (1, 7, 10)
- Kevin Grainger – mastering (1–3, 7, 11, 13–15, 17), mixing (2, 3, 11, 13–15, 17)
- Mike Dean – mastering, mixing (4–6, 8, 9, 12, 16)
- Salem Al Fakir – engineering (1, 16)
- Vincent Pontare – engineering (1, 16)
- Carl Nordström – engineering (2, 7, 11, 14–17)
- Johannes Klahr – engineering (2)
- Todd Cooper – engineering (2)
- Jacob Mühlrad – engineering (3)
- Shin Kamiyama – engineering (4)
- Fred Again – engineering (10)
- Parisi – engineering (10)
- Magnus Lidehäll – vocal production (2)
- Kelvin Krash – vocal production (6)
- Martin Kierszenbaum – vocal production (13)
- Grant Valentine – vocal engineering (13)

== Charts ==
=== Weekly charts ===
Weekly chart performance for Paradise Again
Chart (2022)	Peak position
Australian Albums (ARIA)	96
Austrian Albums (Ö3 Austria)	59
Belgian Albums (Ultratop Flanders)	29
Belgian Albums (Ultratop Wallonia)	104
Canadian Albums (Billboard)	48
Dutch Albums (Album Top 100)	9
Finnish Albums (Suomen virallinen lista)	28
French Albums (SNEP)	127
Italian Albums (FIMI)	77
Lithuanian Albums (AGATA)	27
Norwegian Albums (VG-lista)	7
Scottish Albums (Official Charts)	5
Spanish Albums (Promusicae)	9
Swedish Albums (Sverigetopplistan)	4
Swiss Albums (Schweizer Hitparade)	14
UK Albums (Official Charts)	70
UK Dance Albums (Official Charts)	1
US Billboard 200	121
US Top Dance Albums (Billboard)	1

=== Year-end charts ===
Year-end chart performance for Paradise Again
Chart (2022)	Position
Dutch Albums (Album Top 100)	73
US Top Dance/Electronic Albums (Billboard)	21

== Certifications ==
Certifications for Paradise Again
Region	Certification	Certified units/sales
Poland (ZPAV)	Gold	10,000^{‡}
^{‡} Sales+streaming figures based on certification alone.
