= Lifetime (Swedish House Mafia song) =

2021 single by Swedish House Mafia featuring Ty Dolla Sign and 070 Shake

Single by Swedish House Mafia featuring Ty Dolla Sign and 070 Shake

from the album Paradise Again
- Released: 19 July 2021
- Genre: Pop; R&B; electronic
- Length: 3:06
- Label: Republic
- Songwriter(s): Vincent Pontare; Axel Hedfors; Carl Nordström; Danielle Balbuena; Rakim Mayers; Sebastian Ingrosso; Steve Angello; Tyrone Griffin Jr
- Producer(s): Swedish House Mafia; Carl Nordström

Swedish House Mafia singles chronology
"It Gets Better" (2021)	"Lifetime" (2021)	"Moth to a Flame" (2021)

Ty Dolla Sign singles chronology
"I Believed It" (2021)	"Lifetime" (2021)	"Memories" (2021)

070 Shake singles chronology
"Trumpets" (2020)	"Lifetime" (2021)	"Lose My Cool" (2021)

Music video
- "Lifetime" on YouTube

"Lifetime" is a song by Swedish house music supergroup Swedish House Mafia, featuring vocals from American singer Ty Dolla Sign and American rapper 070 Shake. It was released on July 19, 2021, as the second single from the group's debut studio album, Paradise Again, via Republic Records.

== Music video ==
The music video was directed by Alexander Wessely. It depicts the trio as they awake and walk through a vast desert before stumbling across a strange monolith that appears to lead to another world.

== Live performance ==
On July 19, 2021, Swedish House Mafia performed "Lifetime" on The Tonight Show Starring Jimmy Fallon.

== Charts ==
=== Weekly charts ===
Weekly chart performance for "Lifetime"
Chart (2021)	Peak position
Czech Republic (Rádio – Top 100)	67
Hungary (Rádiós Top 40)	34
New Zealand Hot Singles (RMNZ)	19
Sweden (Sverigetopplistan)	35
US Hot Dance/Electronic Songs (Billboard)	9
US Pop Airplay (Billboard)	33

=== Year-end charts ===
Year-end chart performance for "Lifetime"
Chart (2021)	Position
US Hot Dance/Electronic Songs (Billboard)	39

== Release history ==
Release history for "Lifetime"
Region	Date	Format	Label	Ref.
Various	19 July 2021	Digital download; streaming	Republic	
United States	27 July 2021	Contemporary hit radio	Republic	
