= Moth to a Flame =

2021 single by Swedish House Mafia and the Weeknd

Single by Swedish House Mafia and the Weeknd

from the album Paradise Again and Dawn FM (Alternate World)
- Released: 22 October 2021
- Genre: Synth-pop
- Length: 3:54
- Label: Republic
- Songwriters: Axel Hedfors; Steve Angello; Sebastian Ingrosso; Abel Tesfaye; Carl Nordström
- Producers: Swedish House Mafia; Carl Nordström

Swedish House Mafia singles chronology
"Lifetime" (2021)	"Moth to a Flame" (2021)	"Redlight" (2022)

The Weeknd singles chronology
"Hurricane" (2021)	"Moth to a Flame" (2021)	"One Right Now" (2021)

Music video
- "Moth to a Flame" on YouTube

"Moth to a Flame" is a song by Swedish house supergroup Swedish House Mafia and Canadian singer and songwriter the Weeknd. It was released on 22 October 2021 through Republic Records as the third single from the former's debut studio album Paradise Again, and was later included on the Alternate World edition of the latter's fifth studio album Dawn FM; both released in 2022

== Background and release ==
A potential collaboration between Swedish House Mafia and the Weeknd was first speculated when the group signed with the Weeknd's longtime manager Wassim "Sal" Slaiby in April 2021. It was later teased by the Weeknd during an episode of his Apple Music 1 radio show Memento Mori, in which he stated in the introduction "The Swedes just landed in L.A." A snippet of "Moth to a Flame" was then revealed by Swedish House Mafia during their performance at the 2021 MTV Video Music Awards in September. On 19 October, the group and the singer teased the single once again before announcing that it would be released on 22 October. In celebration of its release, Swedish House Mafia hosted the twentieth episode of Memento Mori.

== Critical reception ==
Dani Blum of Pitchfork named "Moth to a Flame" the best song on Paradise Again, writing that the "tingling production is more elegant than Swedish House Mafia seemed capable of a decade ago." Robin Murray of Clash described it as "a sizzling 80s tinged burner that places [the Weeknd] within an electronic orchestra." Thomas Stremfel of Spectrum Culture wrote that "equally unique framing and biblical stakes elevate the track to a pop epic." Billboard's Starr Bowenbank compared "Moth to a Flame" to the Weeknd's "Blinding Lights", highlighting its synth as being menacing in a manner akin to the song.

== Chart performance ==
In the United Kingdom, "Moth to a Flame" debuted at number 15 on the UK Singles Chart with first-week sales of 19,853 units, making it Swedish House Mafia's seventh top 20 single and the Weeknd's 19th. In the United States, "Moth to a Flame" entered the Hot Dance/Electronic Songs chart at number two with 12.9 million streams, 1.7 million radio impressions and 3,800 downloads sold in its opening week. It marked Swedish House Mafia's third top 10 single on the chart and was the highest debut on the chart since Kygo and Whitney Houston's "Higher Love" in July 2019.

== Music video ==
The music video for the song premiered on 22 October 2021 alongside the single's release and was directed by Alexander Wessely. The music video ends with a snippet of "Mafia", the track that follows "Moth to a Flame" on Paradise Again.

== Live performances ==
Swedish House Mafia and the Weeknd performed "Moth to a Flame" at the Coachella Valley Music and Arts Festival on 17 April 2022. Starting on 10 June 2023, "Moth to a Flame" served as the closing track for the Weeknd's After Hours til Dawn Tour. The trio performed the song on 12 December 2023 at the opening ceremony of the 2023 FIFA Club World Cup in Jeddah, Saudi Arabia.

== Track listing ==
- Digital download and streaming
1. "Moth to a Flame" – 3:54
- Digital download and streaming – Extended Mix
1. "Moth to a Flame" (Extended Mix) – 5:00
- Digital download and streaming – Chris Lake Remix
1. "Moth to a Flame" (Chris Lake Remix) – 4:38
- Digital download and streaming – Tourist Remix
1. "Moth to a Flame" (Tourist Remix) – 4:53
- Digital download and streaming – Moojo Remix
1. "Moth to a Flame" (Moojo Remix) – 7:14
- Digital download and streaming – Adriatique Remix
1. "Moth to a Flame" (Adriatique Remix) – 6:29

== Personnel ==
- Swedish House Mafia – production, keyboards, bass, drum programming
- Carl Nordström – production, keyboards, bass, drum programming
- Shin Kamiyama – mixing
- Mike Dean – mastering
- The Weeknd – vocals

== Charts ==
=== Weekly charts ===
Weekly chart performance for "Moth to a Flame"
Chart (2021–2026)	Peak position
Australia (ARIA)	8
Austria (Ö3 Austria Top 40)	19
Belgium (Ultratop 50 Flanders)	17
Belgium (Ultratop 50 Wallonia)	16
Bulgaria International (PROPHON)	8
Canada Hot 100 (Billboard)	7
Canada AC (Billboard)	26
Canada CHR/Top 40 (Billboard)	7
Canada Hot AC (Billboard)	14
CIS Airplay (TopHit)	105
Czech Republic Singles Digital (ČNS IFPI)	21
Croatia International (HRT)	5
Denmark (Tracklisten)	10
El Salvador (ASAP EGC)	10
Euro Digital Song Sales (Billboard)	9
Finland (Suomen virallinen lista)	6
France (SNEP)	34
Germany (GfK)	14
Global 200 (Billboard)	10
Greece International (IFPI)	3
Hungary (Rádiós Top 40)	30
Hungary (Single Top 40)	11
Hungary (Stream Top 40)	15
Iceland (Tónlistinn)	13
India International (IMI)	7
Ireland (IRMA)	13
Italy (FIMI)	39
Lebanon (Lebanese Top 20)	10
Lithuania (AGATA)	4
Luxembourg (Billboard)	16
Malaysia (Billboard)	4
Mexico Airplay (Billboard)	23
Netherlands (Dutch Top 40)	10
Netherlands (Single Top 100)	19
New Zealand (Recorded Music NZ)	13
Norway (VG-lista)	7
Poland Airplay (ZPAV)	78
Portugal (AFP)	11
Romania Airplay (TopHit)	269
San Marino (SMRRTV Top 50)	11
Singapore (RIAS)	11
Slovakia Airplay (ČNS IFPI)	50
Slovakia Singles Digital (ČNS IFPI)	13
South Africa (TOSAC)	22
Spain (Promusicae)	56
Sweden (Sverigetopplistan)	5
Switzerland (Schweizer Hitparade)	10
Ukraine Airplay (TopHit)	64
UK Singles (Official Charts)	15
UK Dance (Official Charts)	4
US Billboard Hot 100	27
US Hot Dance/Electronic Songs (Billboard)	2
US Pop Airplay (Billboard)	20

=== Year-end charts ===
2021 year-end chart performance for "Moth to a Flame"
Chart (2021)	Position
Netherlands (Dutch Top 40)	69
US Hot Dance/Electronic Songs (Billboard)	26

2022 year-end chart performance for "Moth to a Flame"
Chart (2022)	Position
Belgium (Ultratop 50 Flanders)	107
Belgium (Ultratop 50 Wallonia)	95
Canada (Canadian Hot 100)	48
France (SNEP)	95
Germany (Official German Charts)	95
Global 200 (Billboard)	142
Lithuania (AGATA)	68
Netherlands (Dutch Top 40)	56
Netherlands (Single Top 100)	94
Sweden (Sverigetopplistan)	65
Switzerland (Schweizer Hitparade)	53
US Hot Dance/Electronic Songs (Billboard)	10

== Certifications ==
Certifications for "Moth to a Flame"
Region	Certification	Certified units/sales
Australia (ARIA)	Platinum	70,000^{‡}
Austria (IFPI Austria)	2× Platinum	60,000^{‡}
Belgium (BRMA)	Platinum	40,000^{‡}
Canada (Music Canada)	3× Platinum	240,000^{‡}
Denmark (IFPI Danmark)	Platinum	90,000^{‡}
France (SNEP)	Diamond	333,333^{‡}
Germany (BVMI)	Gold	200,000^{‡}
Italy (FIMI)	2× Platinum	200,000^{‡}
Netherlands (NVPI)	Platinum	80,000^{‡}
New Zealand (RMNZ)	2× Platinum	60,000^{‡}
Poland (ZPAV)	2× Platinum	100,000^{‡}
Portugal (AFP)	3× Platinum	75,000^{‡}
Spain (Promusicae)	Platinum	60,000^{‡}
United Kingdom (BPI)	Platinum	600,000^{‡}
United States (RIAA)	Platinum	1,000,000^{‡}
Streaming
Greece (IFPI Greece)	Diamond	10,000,000^{†}
^{‡} Sales+streaming figures based on certification alone.^{†} Streaming-only figures based on certification alone.

== Release history ==
Release history and formats for "Moth to a Flame"
Region	Date	Format	Version	Label(s)	Ref.
Various	22 October 2021	Digital download; streaming	Original	Republic	
United States	26 October 2021	Contemporary hit radio	Original	Republic	
Various	3 January 2022	Digital download; streaming	Extended Mix	Republic	
Various	4 February 2022	Digital download; streaming	Chris Lake Remix	Republic	
Various	18 February 2022	Digital download; streaming	Tourist Remix	Republic	
Various	17 June 2022	Digital download; streaming	Moojo Remix	Republic	
Various	12 August 2022	Digital download; streaming	Adriatique Remix	Republic	
