= One (Swedish House Mafia song) =

2010 single by Swedish House Mafia

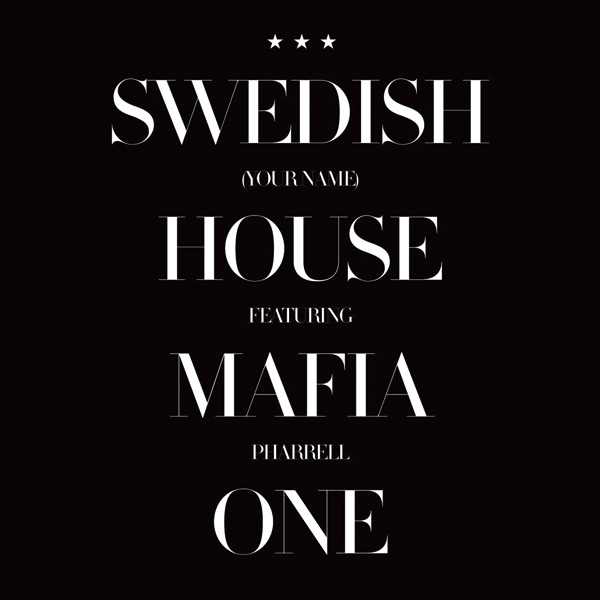

Single by Swedish House Mafia featuring Pharrell

from the album Until One and Until Now
- Released: 22 July 2010
- Recorded: 2010
- Genre: Electro house; progressive house
- Length: 5:50 (original instrumental mix); 2:48 (radio edit); 3:23 (album version); 3:03 ("One (Your Name)" album version); 4:23 ("One Symphony")
- Label: Virgin; EMI; Astralwerks; Polydor
- Composers: Axwell; Sebastian Ingrosso; Steve Angello
- Lyricist: Pharrell Williams (vocal version)
- Producer: Swedish House Mafia

Swedish House Mafia singles chronology
"One" (2010)	"Miami 2 Ibiza" (2010)

"One" is the first single by Swedish house music supergroup Swedish House Mafia. A vocal version titled "One (Your Name)", featuring American singer Pharrell Williams, was released in July 2010. The song also appears on the group's mix album Until One, and the studio album Until Now.

The song debuted on BBC Radio 1 with Zane Lowe and was chosen as the hottest record in April 2010. "One" peaked at number two in Belgium (Flanders) and on the UK Dance Chart. It reached number one in the Netherlands, number seven in Ireland and in the United Kingdom on the UK Singles Chart. It also charted in Sweden, Switzerland, Denmark, Austria and Germany. A video directed by the Swedish directors Henrik Hanson and Christian Larson supported the release.

In 2019, Swedish composer Jacob Mühlrad contributed to a symphonic version of "One", which Swedish House Mafia played on tour that year. The version was officially released on 1 January 2022, under the title "One Symphony".

== Writing and production ==
"One"
The Swedish House Mafia's first studio single "One", released in 2010.

"One" was written and produced by Axwell, Steve Angello and Sebastian Ingrosso. The lyrics in "One (Your Name)" are written by Pharrell Williams. According to Angello the vocals were recorded in Australia over a year prior to release, and were initially intended for another song. He said, "We took that and tried it on One and it worked. Well, it worked after Axwell Melodyne'd the crap out of it! [...] it's kind of old skool, chopping up one vocal and turning it into a whole dance track.".

According to an interview in Future Music magazine (issue 229), the track was composed in Logic using various plug-ins. Pharrell's vocals were heavily processed in Melodyne and the final track was mixed and mastered at Metropolis Studios London on an SSL console.

The music video features a Teenage Engineering OP-1.

== Critical reception ==
Nick Levine of Digital Spy gave the song four out of five stars and wrote: "'One (Your Name)' is a booming Eurodance club banger boasting an ear-snaggingly simple synth line, trancey whooshes aplenty and cred-boosting vocals from Neptunes star Pharrell Williams [...] it's neither original nor refined, but boy does it hit the spot."

== Track listing ==
- Digital download
1. "One" – 5:50
- Promo CD single
1. "One" (Radio Edit) – 2:47
2. "One" – 5:55
- UK CD single
1. "One (Your Name)" (Radio Edit) (featuring Pharrell) – 2:41
2. "One" (Radio Edit) – 2:48
- UK digital download / CD maxi single
1. "One (Your Name)" (Radio Edit) (featuring Pharrell) – 2:43
2. "One" (Radio Edit) – 2:49
3. "One (Your Name)" (Vocal Mix) (featuring Pharrell) – 5:51
4. "One" (Original Mix) – 5:51
5. "One" (Congorock Remix) – 6:15
6. "One (Your Name)" (Caspa Vocal Remix) (featuring Pharrell) – 4:11
7. "One" (Caspa Dub Remix) – 4:11
8. "One" (Netsky Remix) – 5:40
- Digital download
1. "One Symphony" – 4:23

== Charts ==
=== Weekly charts ===
Weekly chart performance for "One"
Chart (2010)	Peak position
Austria (Ö3 Austria Top 40)	25
Belgium (Ultratop 50 Flanders)	2
Belgium (Ultratop 50 Wallonia)	6
Canada Hot 100 (Billboard)	88
Czech Republic Airplay (ČNS IFPI)	4
Denmark (Tracklisten)	20
European Hot 100 Singles	26
France Download (SNEP)	16
Germany (GfK)	41
Hungary (Dance Top 40)	11
Ireland (IRMA)	7
Netherlands (Dutch Top 40)	1
Netherlands (Single Top 100)	3
Poland (Dance Top 50)	2
Romania (Romanian Top 100)	7
Slovakia Airplay (ČNS IFPI)	4
Sweden (Sverigetopplistan)	11
Switzerland (Schweizer Hitparade)	13
UK Singles (Official Charts)	7
UK Dance (Official Charts)	2
US Hot Dance Club Songs (Billboard)	3
US Dance Airplay (Billboard)	6

=== Year-end charts ===
Year-end chart performance for "One"
Chart (2010)	Position
Belgium (Ultratop Flanders)	6
Belgium (Ultratop Wallonia)	34
Hungary (Dance Top 40)	41
Netherlands (Dutch Top 40)	23
Netherlands (Single Top 100)	13
Sweden (Sverigetopplistan)	21
Switzerland (Schweizer Hitparade)	61
UK Singles (Official Charts Company)	73
Chart (2011)	Position
Hungary (Dance Top 40)	68
Romania (Romanian Top 100)	49
Sweden (Sverigetopplistan)	53

== Certifications ==
Certifications for "One"
Region	Certification	Certified units/sales
Australia (ARIA) "One (Your Name)"	Platinum	70,000^{‡}
Belgium (BRMA)	Platinum	30,000^{*}
Brazil (Pro-Música Brasil) "One (Your Name)"	Gold	30,000^{‡}
Canada (Music Canada)	Platinum	80,000^{‡}
Denmark (IFPI Danmark)	Gold	15,000^{^}
Germany (BVMI) "One (Your Name)"	Gold	150,000^{‡}
Italy (FIMI)	Gold	15,000^{*}
Netherlands (NVPI)	Platinum	20,000^{^}
New Zealand (RMNZ) "One (Your Name)"	Gold	15,000^{‡}
Sweden (GLF)	7× Platinum	280,000^{‡}
United Kingdom (BPI) "One (Your Name)"	Platinum	600,000^{‡}
United States (RIAA) "One (Your Name)"	Gold	500,000^{‡}
Streaming
Denmark (IFPI Danmark)	Gold	900,000^{†}
^{*} Sales figures based on certification alone.^{^} Shipments figures based on certification alone.^{‡} Sales+streaming figures based on certification alone.^{†} Streaming-only figures based on certification alone.

== Release history ==
=== "One" ===
Region	Date	Format	Label
Sweden	6 June 2010	Digital download	Virgin; EMI; Astralwerks; Polydor

=== "One (Your Name)" ===
Region	Date	Format	Label
Sweden	27 June 2010	Digital download	Virgin; EMI; Astralwerks; Polydor
United Kingdom	25 July 2010	Digital download	Virgin; EMI; Astralwerks; Polydor
United Kingdom	26 July 2010	CD single	Virgin; EMI; Astralwerks; Polydor

=== "One Symphony" ===
Region	Date	Format	Label
Various	1 January 2022	Digital download	SSA Recording; Republic

== See also ==
- List of Dutch Top 40 number-one singles of 2010
