= It Gets Better (song) =

Single by Swedish House Mafia

from the album Paradise Again
- Released: 15 July 2021
- Recorded: 2021
- Genre: EDM
- Length: 3:04
- Label: SSA; Republic
- Songwriters: Al Mack; Axel Hedfors; Carl Nordström; Lee Hazlewood; Magnus Lidehäll; Sebastian Ingrosso; Steve Angello
- Producers: Swedish House Mafia; Carl Nordström

Swedish House Mafia singles chronology
"Don't You Worry Child" (2012)	"It Gets Better" (2021)	"Lifetime" (2021)

Music video
- "It Gets Better" on YouTube

"It Gets Better" is a song by house music supergroup Swedish House Mafia, released on 15 July 2021 through SSA Recording and Republic Records. It is the group's first single in eight years, following their 2013 hiatus and signing to Republic. The song precedes Swedish House Mafia's debut studio album, Paradise Again, and was noted as being darker than their previous music.

== Background ==
An early version of "It Gets Better" was previewed during the Save the World Reunion Tour in 2019. As a result, it was included on Dancing Astronaut's list of the most-anticipated IDs of 2021. The song was "radically revised" by Swedish House Mafia in early 2021. Following fan demand for the 2019 version, group member Axwell released the "Stockholm version" via Dropbox in November 2021.

== Composition ==
"It Gets Better" was noted as a deviation from the sound of Swedish House Mafia's previous material. In a cover story with Billboard, the group discussed changing their sound for their comeback in order to adapt to the new electronic dance music scene. Paper called the song a "techno banger with a clanging drop and a little rock 'n' roll bombast", while Billboard described it as "a sleek, imposing amalgamation of punchy beats, walls of synth and quick 180s into drops composed of what appears to be cowbell". Its sound received comparisons to the music of the Chemical Brothers, Leftfield and the Prodigy. "It Gets Better" samples the 1994 song "One More Time" by Divas of Color. It also samples Nancy Sinatra's "Lightning's Girl"; as a result, songwriter Lee Hazlewood receives a writing credit.

== Critical reception ==
Professional ratings
Review scores
Source	Rating
Aftonbladet	3/5 stars
Göteborgs-Posten	5/5 stars
Verdens Gang	4/6 stars

"It Gets Better" generally received positive reviews from critics. Göteborgs-Posten welcomed the song's message in light of the COVID-19 pandemic. The song has received also received positive reviews from The New York Times and Billboard.

== Promotion ==
The music video for "It Gets Better" was directed by Alexander Wessely. It features a group of zombie-like characters dancing along to the track, while the three group members are suspended above them. Swedish House Mafia performed the song on The Tonight Show Starring Jimmy Fallon on 19 July 2021, as well as at the pre-show for the 2021 MTV Video Music Awards on 12 September; both performances featured the song in a medley with "Lifetime".

== Track listing ==
- Digital release
1. "It Gets Better" – 3:04
- Digital release
1. "It Gets Better" (Stockholm version) – 6:25

== Credits and personnel ==
Credits adapted from Tidal.

- Swedish House Mafia – recording engineer
  - Axwell – producer, composer, lyricist
  - Sebastian Ingrosso – producer, composer, lyricist
  - Steve Angello – producer, composer, lyricist
- Al Mack – composer, lyricist
- Carl Nordström – producer, composer, lyricist
- Lee Hazlewood – composer, lyricist
- Magnus Lidehäll – composer, lyricist
- Mike Dean – mastering engineer, mixer

== Charts ==
Chart performance for "It Gets Better"
Chart (2021)	Peak position
New Zealand Hot Singles (RMNZ)	35
Sweden (Sverigetopplistan)	35
US Hot Dance/Electronic Songs (Billboard)	13
