= Calling (Lose My Mind) =

Single by Sebastian Ingrosso and Alesso featuring Ryan Tedder
- Released: 13 March 2012
- Genre: Progressive house
- Length: 3:25
- Label: Refune Music; EMI
- Songwriters: Ryan Tedder; Sebastian Ingrosso; Alesso; Matthew Koma
- Producers: Sebastian Ingrosso; Alesso

Sebastian Ingrosso singles chronology
"Kidsos" (2009)	"Calling (Lose My Mind)" (2012)	"Reload" (2013)

Alesso singles chronology
"Calling (Lose My Mind)" (2012)	"Years" (2012)

Music video
- "Calling (Lose My Mind)" on YouTube

"Calling (Lose My Mind)" is a single by Swedish house producers Sebastian Ingrosso (of Swedish House Mafia) and Alesso featuring American recording artist Ryan Tedder of OneRepublic.

It was released in Sweden on 13 March 2012 and in the UK on 27 May 2012. American recording artist Matthew Koma assisted the artists in writing the song. The original instrumental version of the track was released on 31 August 2011, under the name "Calling". The song topped the Billboard Hot Dance Club Songs chart and was also a top-ten hit in Australia and the UK. It was featured on Swedish House Mafia's second compilation album Until Now, released on 22 October 2012.

== Chart performance ==
=== Weekly charts ===
Chart (2012)	Peak position
Australia Dance Chart (ARIA)	9
Belgium (Ultratip Bubbling Under Flanders)	52
Belgium (Ultratip Bubbling Under Wallonia)	32
Czech Republic Airplay (ČNS IFPI)	49
France (SNEP)	136
Ireland (IRMA)	47
Netherlands (Dutch Top 40)	38
Netherlands (Single Top 100)	58
Scotland Singles (Official Charts)	13
Sweden (Sverigetopplistan)	18
Switzerland (Schweizer Hitparade)	71
UK Dance (Official Charts)	4
UK Singles (Official Charts)	19
US Dance Club Songs (Billboard)	1
US Dance Airplay (Billboard)	9

=== Year-end charts ===
Chart (2012)	Position
Sweden (Sverigetopplistan)	39
US Dance Club Songs (Billboard)	31
US Dance/Mix Show Airplay (Billboard)	39

== Certifications ==
Region	Certification	Certified units/sales
Australia (ARIA)	Gold	35,000^{‡}
Brazil (Pro-Música Brasil)	Gold	30,000^{‡}
Canada (Music Canada)	Gold	40,000^{‡}
Italy (FIMI)	Gold	15,000^{‡}
Sweden (GLF)	3× Platinum	120,000^{‡}
United Kingdom (BPI)	Silver	200,000^{‡}
United States (RIAA)	Gold	500,000^{‡}
Streaming
Denmark (IFPI Danmark)	Gold	900,000^{†}
^{‡} Sales+streaming figures based on certification alone.^{†} Streaming-only figures based on certification alone.
