= Reload (Sebastian Ingrosso and Tommy Trash song) =

2012 single by Sebastian Ingrosso and Tommy Trash

Single by Sebastian Ingrosso and Tommy Trash

from the album Until Now
- Released: 29 September 2012
- Genre: Progressive house
- Length: 6:02
- Label: Refune Records
- Songwriters: Sebastian Ingrosso; Tommy Trash
- Producers: Sebastian Ingrosso; Tommy Trash

Sebastian Ingrosso singles chronology
"Calling (Lose My Mind)" (2012)	"Reload" (2012)	"Roar" (2013)

Tommy Trash singles chronology
"Cascade" (2012)	"Reload" (2012)	"Sunrise (Won't Get Lost)" (2012)

"Reload" is a song by Swedish house producer Sebastian Ingrosso and Australian producer Tommy Trash. The original mix, written and produced by Sebastian Ingrosso and Tommy Trash, was released by Sebastian Ingrosso's label Refune Records on September 29, 2012. It was included on Ingrosso's group Swedish House Mafia's compilation album Until Now. A version featuring vocals from Swedish singer John Martin was released the following year.

== Charts ==
=== Weekly charts ===
Chart (2013)	Peak position
Belgium (Ultratop 50 Flanders)	48
Belgium (Ultratip Bubbling Under Wallonia)	20

=== Year-end charts ===
Year-end chart performance for "Reload"
Chart (2013)	Position
Russia Airplay (TopHit)	112

== Vocal version ==
"Reload"

Single by Sebastian Ingrosso and Tommy Trash featuring John Martin
- Released: 10 May 2013
- Genre: Progressive house
- Length: 3:41
- Label: Refune
- Songwriters: Sebastian Ingrosso; Michel Zitron; Adam Baptiste; Tommy Trash; Vincent Pontare; John Martin Lindström
- Producers: Sebastian Ingrosso; Tommy Trash

Sebastian Ingrosso singles chronology
"Calling (Lose My Mind)" (2012)	"Reload" (2013)	"Roar" (2013)

John Martin singles chronology
"Don't You Worry Child" (2012)	"Reload" (2013)	"Children of the Sun" (2013)

The vocal mix features vocals from Swedish singer John Martin.

=== Track listing ===
Digital download - EP
No.	Title	Length
1.	"Reload" (Vocal Version) (Radio Edit)	3:41
2.	"Reload" (Vocal Version) (Extended Mix)	6:00
3.	"Reload" (Instrumental Version)	6:00
4.	"Reload" (Vocal Version) (Tiedye Remix)	6:29

Digital download - remixes
No.	Title	Length
1.	"Reload" (Vocal Version) (Clockwork Remix)	6:03
2.	"Reload" (Vocal Version) (Bare Remix)	4:54

=== Charts ===
Chart (2013)	Peak position
Australia (ARIA)	20
Austria (Ö3 Austria Top 40)	56
Czech Republic Airplay (ČNS IFPI)	29
France (SNEP)	152
Germany (GfK)	89
Hungary (Dance Top 40)	15
Hungary (Rádiós Top 40)	14
Ireland (IRMA)	13
Lebanon (The Official Lebanese Top 20)	12
Netherlands (Single Top 100)	66
Scotland Singles (OCC)	1
Slovakia Airplay (ČNS IFPI)	41
Sweden (Sverigetopplistan)	5
Switzerland (Schweizer Hitparade)	70
UK Singles (OCC)	3
UK Dance (OCC)	1
US Dance Club Songs (Billboard)	4
US Hot Dance/Electronic Songs (Billboard)	15
US Dance/Mix Show Airplay (Billboard)	7

=== Year-end charts ===
Chart (2013)	Position
Hungary (Dance Top 40)	57
Hungary (Rádiós Top 40)	82
Sweden (Sverigetopplistan)	42
UK Singles (Official Charts Company)	99
US Hot Dance/Electronic Songs (Billboard)	37

=== Certifications ===
Region	Certification	Certified units/sales
Australia (ARIA)	Gold	35,000^{^}
Sweden (GLF)	2× Platinum	80,000^{‡}
United Kingdom (BPI)	Gold	400,000^{‡}
^{^} Shipments figures based on certification alone.^{‡} Sales+streaming figures based on certification alone.

=== Release history ===
Country	Release date	Format
Europe	10 May 2013	Digital download
United Kingdom	5 July 2013	CD single
