= Swedish House Mafia =

Swedish supergroup

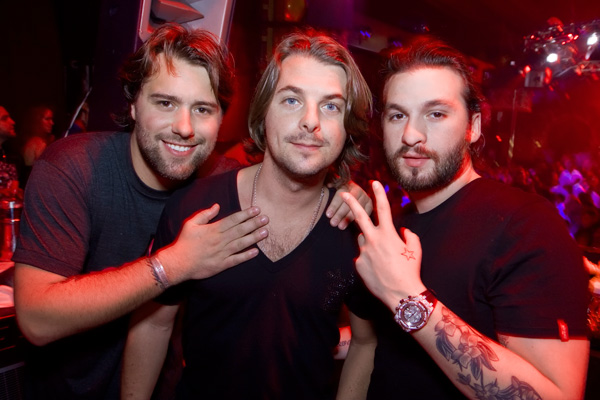
- Swedish House Mafia in 2011. From left to right: Sebastian Ingrosso, Axwell, Steve Angello

Background information
- Also known as: The Swedes
- Origin: Stockholm, Sweden
- Genres: Progressive house; electro house
- Instruments: Logic Pro; Pioneer CDJ; Teenage Engineering OP-1
- Years active: 2008–2013; 2018–present
- Labels: SUPERHUMAN; Virgin; EMI; Astralwerks; Polydor; UMG; Ministry of Sound; Columbia; Sony Music; Republic
- Spinoffs: Axwell & Ingrosso
- Members: Axwell; Steve Angello; Sebastian Ingrosso
- Past members: Eric Prydz
- Website: swedishhousemafia.com

Swedish House Mafia (SHM) are a Swedish house supergroup consisting of Axwell, Steve Angello and Sebastian Ingrosso. The group officially formed in late 2008, were placed at number ten on the DJ Mag Top 100 DJ Poll 2011, and have been called "the faces of mainstream progressive house music", while being credited for "setting the tone for the EDM boom of the early 2010s, more than any other act in modern dance music". In 2012, they were ranked at number twelve on the DJ Mag Top 100 Poll. They are recognized for bringing the progressive house genre into the mainstream around 2009–2010, together with their compatriot Avicii, standardizing a sound that until recently was relegated to the underground EDM.

The group scored international hits in 2010 with tracks such as "One (Your Name)" (featuring Pharrell Williams) and "Miami 2 Ibiza" (featuring Tinie Tempah), and their compilation album Until One (2010) the top five in the UK and US dance charts. Two years later, Swedish House Mafia embarked on an extensive farewell tour in support of their second compilation album, Until Now (2012). The compilation album of previously released tracks was certified platinum in Sweden and peaked at number 14 on the Billboard 200.

On 24 June 2012, the group announced they would disband. Their final performance before their breakup was at Ultra Miami on 24 March 2013. For the next five years, Angello worked solo, while Axwell and Ingrosso performed as the duo Axwell & Ingrosso. On 25 March 2018, the group reunited with a surprise closing set at the 20th anniversary of Ultra Music Festival in Miami, Florida.

Starting in 2021, the group began releasing singles from their first proper studio album, including "It Gets Better" and "Moth to a Flame" featuring The Weeknd. The single "Redlight" featuring Sting was released in 2022 ahead of the album Paradise Again. The album reached number one on both the UK Dance Albums chart and Billboard's Top Dance/Electronic Albums chart. Shortly after the album's release, they launched their "Paradise Again World Tour" and co-headlined the Coachella festival with The Weeknd. In 2024, the group returned to the Swedish charts with the single "Lioness" featuring Niki & the Dove.

== History ==
=== Pre-2008: Formation and prior endeavors ===
The Swedish House Mafia logo from its formation until the 2013 split

Before Swedish House Mafia, Axwell, Steve Angello, and Sebastian Ingrosso performed as solo DJs in the late 1990s and early 2000s. Angello and Ingrosso knew each other as children growing up in Stockholm, and would often collaborate under various aliases in their early careers. Collaborations with Axwell came later in the decade after the pair discovered him by a chance meeting. Towards the mid-2000s Axwell, Angello, and Ingrosso found themselves often playing shows together, with fellow Swedish DJ Eric Prydz joining them for some shows. The name Swedish House Mafia came about after friends and fans began labelling the four as they played more and more shows together; they were first officially referred to as "Swedish House Mafia" in March 2007 by the Winter Music Conference. Eventually, the group officially adopted the name in late 2008, with Prydz deciding not to join the group, describing himself as a "control freak" in the studio who can't abide collaboration, even with close friends. Prydz announced he would be leaving the group, soon after the collective officially formed, in November 2008.

=== 2009–2010: Until One and Take One documentary ===
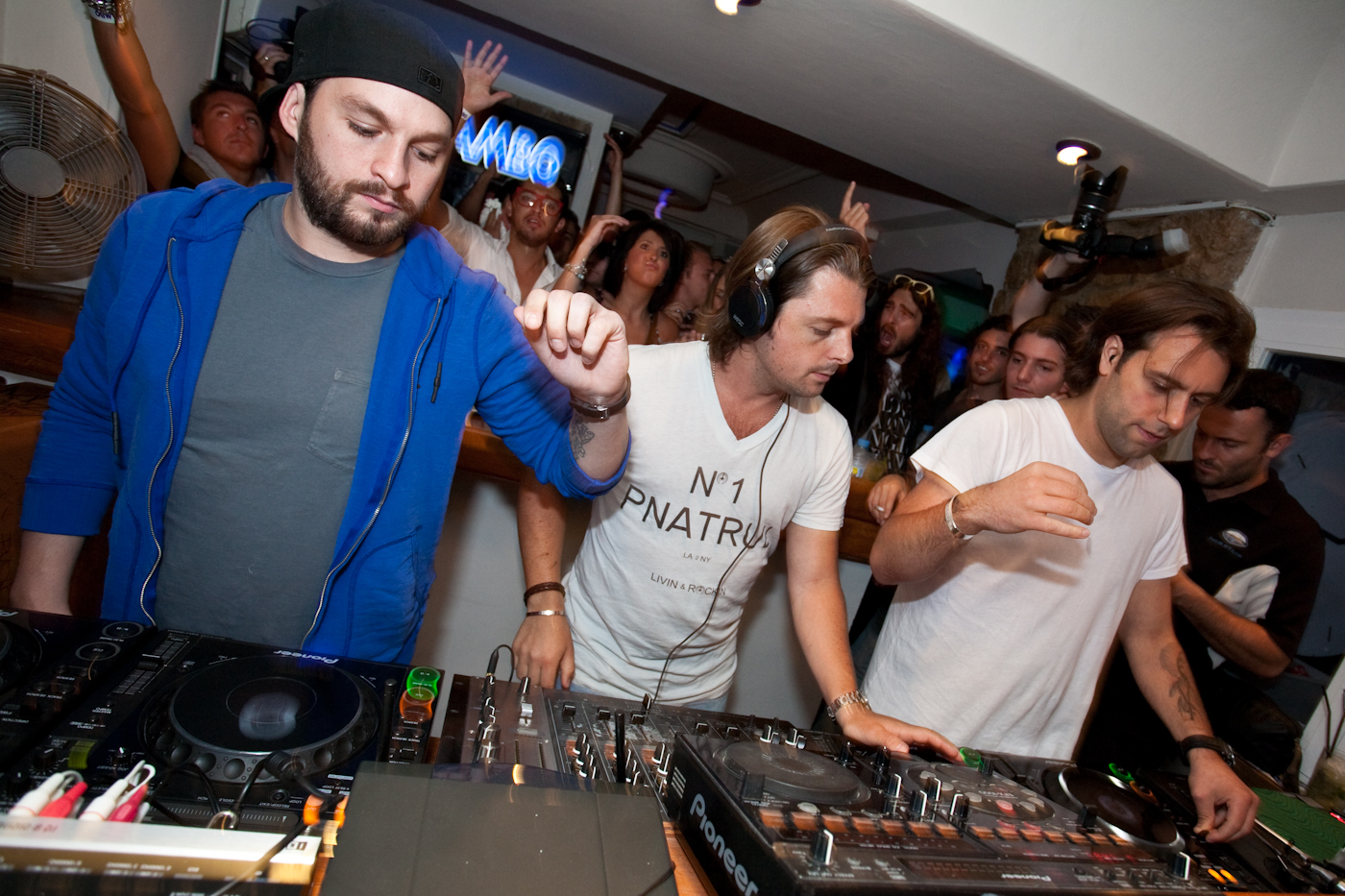
Swedish House Mafia performing in Ibiza

The first production that was released by the group was "Get Dumb" which was produced with Laidback Luke and released in 2007. In 2009, Swedish House Mafia teamed up with Laidback Luke again to produce the track "Leave the World Behind" which featured vocals by Deborah Cox. Although none of these songs were released under the name Swedish House Mafia, the latter would eventually feature on the group's first compilation album Until One.

In 2010, Swedish House Mafia signed a record deal with UMG's Polydor Records (formerly Polygram) after a falling-out with previous record label EMI, due to differing ideas. They released "One", their first official single under the name Swedish House Mafia, on Beatport on 2 May 2010, where it achieved international success, charting at number 7 in the UK Singles Chart. The group followed this with an equally well-received vocal version featuring Pharrell Williams, retitled "One (Your Name)". Their next single, "Miami 2 Ibiza", with Tinie Tempah, was released on 1 October 2010. It charted at number 4 on the UK Chart and was featured on Tempah's debut studio album Disc-Overy. Both tracks were taken from the group's debut compilation album Until One; a collection of productions and remixes from both Swedish House Mafia as a group and as individuals along with other artists as well. It has achieved a BPI Gold Sales award in the United Kingdom and a GLF Platinum Sales award in Sweden.

On 29 November 2010, Swedish House Mafia released their first DVD documentary called Take One. The movie was filmed over the course of 2 years, 253 gigs and 15 countries by Swedish directors Henrik Hanson & Christian Larson. He commented on Take One by saying "It's not narrated at all. It's just sequences of them and it's made into a story. It's all chronological. It's just me following them around and they become characters in their own film. It all happened pretty naturally because they are all such strong characters, all three of them." The documentary starts with Swedish House Mafia in the studio with Laidback Luke working on "Leave the World Behind" and concludes at Ultra Music Festival in 2010 premiering their hit "One".

=== 2011–2012: Until Now, breakup and One Last Tour ===
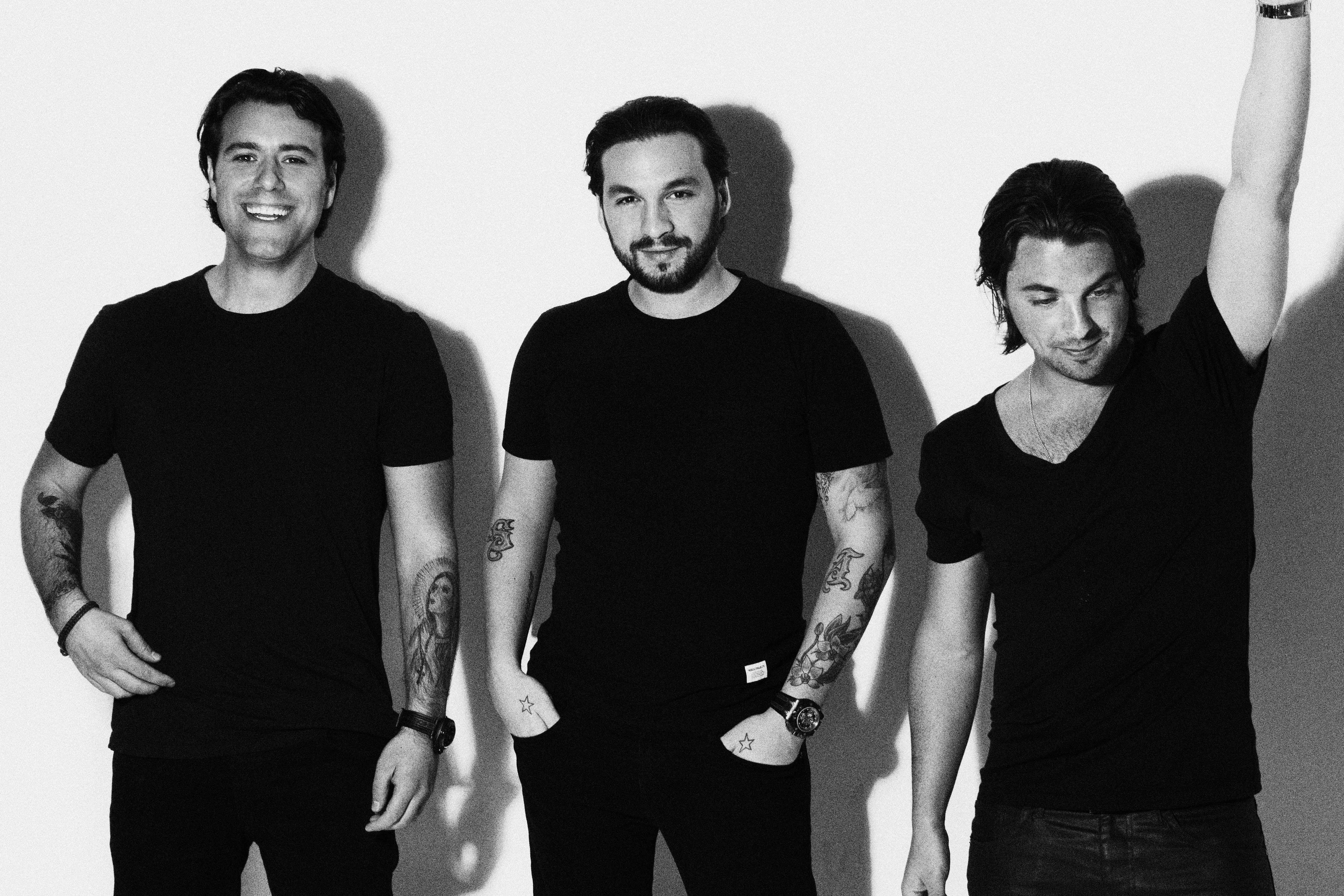
Swedish House Mafia during their Until Now photoshoot

In May 2011, Swedish House Mafia released a new single, "Save the World", featuring John Martin on vocals, the song was a commercial success and charted at number 10 in the UK Chart and 4 in Sweden. Later that year on 16 December, they released the track "Antidote" with Knife Party and their solo effort "Greyhound" on 12 March 2012.

On 24 June 2012, it was announced via the group's website that the final leg of their 2012 tour would be their last: "Today we want to share with you, that the tour we are about to go on will be our last. We want to thank every single one of you that came with us on this journey. We came, we raved, we loved." They stated three show dates, with the last leg of their tour that was announced in August. In an interview with Rolling Stone magazine in regard to the group's breakup, Angello said that "we just decided that we reached a point where we didn't know what the next move would be," and that "we've had beyond our dreams and we've come very, very far"; Angello also stated that he was focusing on developing his own brand, Size Records, while on hiatus.

On 26 June 2012, Swedish House Mafia confirmed they would be playing at the Milton Keynes National Bowl on 14 July along with the likes of Calvin Harris, Alesso, and Example—these artists to be the first to perform in the newly renovated grounds. The trio also confirmed that their closing set would be their last UK show as no dates were planned for the UK during the group's One Last Tour. During their performance, they premiered their new single "Don't You Worry Child" to a 60,000-strong crowd at the end of their set, which would eventually become the group's first and only UK Singles Chart number 1 single. Footage from the two-hour-long performance was used in the music video for the song which was uploaded to YouTube on 14 September that year and has over 1 billion views as of 2025.

On 7 July 2012, Swedish House Mafia played for a sold-out crowd in Phoenix Park, Dublin. The concert descended into chaos, with a "significant number" of random unprovoked attacks at the show, leading to comments from the Irish justice minister concerning the "very unusual" nature of the events. A total of nine people were stabbed. The possibility of multiple attackers was not immediately ruled out. All those attacked were in their teens or twenties. One man was stabbed five times as his girlfriend looked on in horror, receiving wounds to the liver and requiring stitches to his elbow and head. Another man was left in a critical condition after being stabbed four times in the back and kidneys. Two young men, Lee Scanlon (20) and Shane Brophy (21), also died during the concert; the circumstances of their deaths were not immediately clear. Brophy, from County Laois, was rushed to the hospital but died there.

Swedish House Mafia released a statement upon learning of the events:

"We played a festival in Ireland at the weekend and reports of incidents are coming to us. We didn't see anything but have asked for all the info and are respectful of the promoter's need to wait and give us all the clear facts. When we know more we will liaise with the festival promoter directly on what we can do to help but for now, we have to respect their request for us to remain quiet and respectful of their event-safety processes. The festival itself was amazing and we had no idea this had happened and neither did the other numerous artists who played. Once we know all the facts we will deal with it in the best way we can. Thank you. Swedish House Mafia."

Taoiseach Enda Kenny was appalled when he learned of the events: "Absolutely disgraceful, appalling and simply scandalous". Kenny also wondered "whether it's in relation to the sort of music that is played there or not", observing that "800,000 people turned up in Galway for the Volvo finale without any incident and this particular concert in Phoenix Park was in between two others where there were no incidents at all." Another minister, Brian Hayes, said the incidents were "unacceptable [...] very serious, it is wrong and we need to find out what went wrong". Jim Carroll from The Irish Times wrote, "The off-stage events which have dominated the news agenda since the Swedish House Mafia show [...] will forevermore be associated with stabbings and suspected drug deaths rather than the music." Also writing in The Irish Times, Brian Boyd stated that 'the comment [that] "the genre of music has a lot to do with it" bears further examination. Swedish House Mafia are broadly speaking a "dance culture" act [...] and always had a drug component. [...] Today's generation—brought up with binge alcohol tendencies—is popping and dropping indiscriminately. And when you mix a rave drug with large quantities of alcohol, it really is time (for the rest of us) to batten down the hatches.'

Their final and most commercially successful track "Don't You Worry Child", also featuring John Martin, was released on 14 September 2012 becoming number 1 in Australia, Sweden, and the UK as well as becoming a top 10 hit in most other countries. That same month on 17 September, the group announced the release of a second compilation album titled Until Now, with the album later forming the official soundtrack to their One Last Tour.

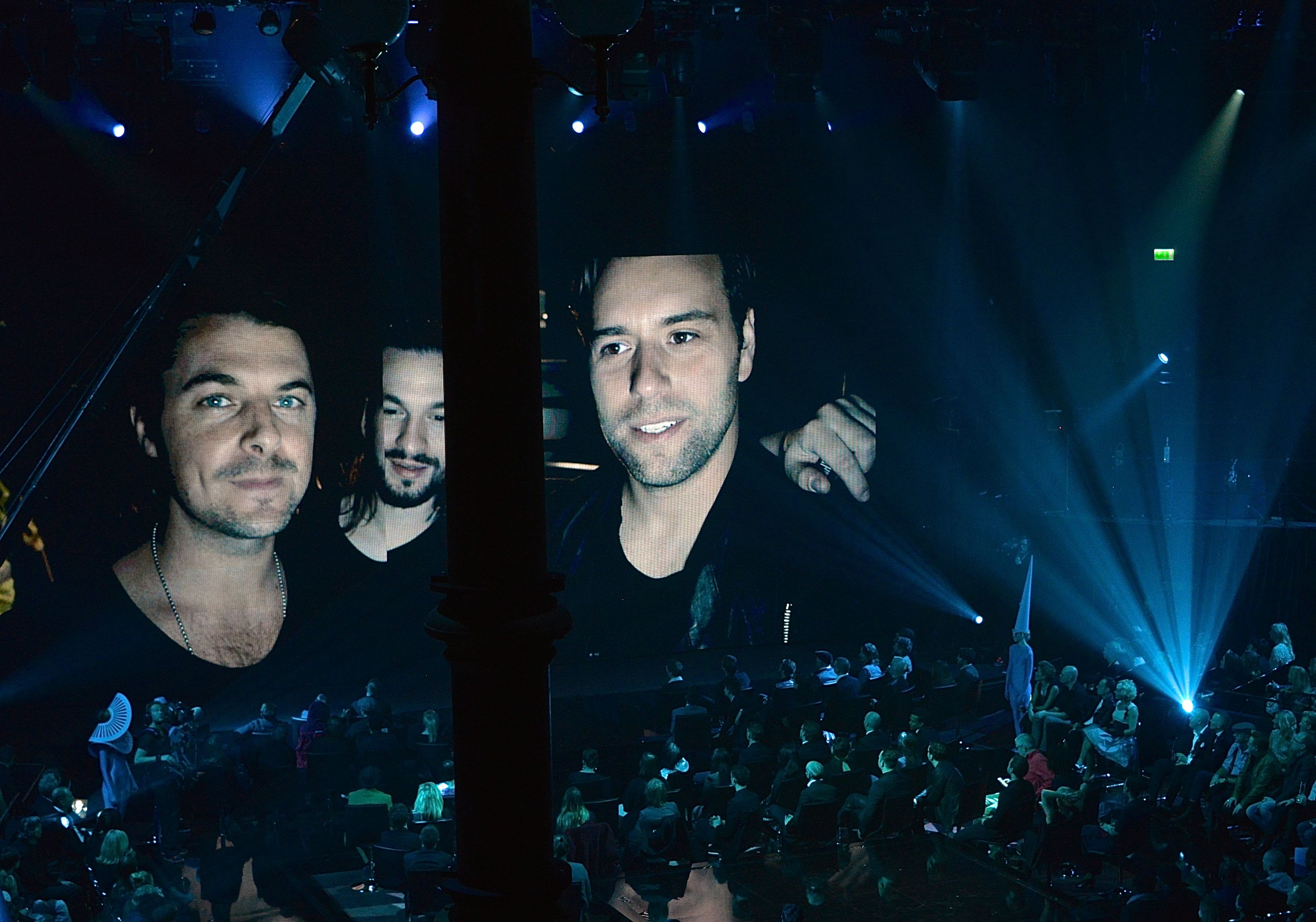
Swedish House Mafia performing at på Grammisgalan 2013, in between their One Last Tour

On 24 September 2012, Swedish House Mafia announced the dates for their farewell tour, called "One Last Tour". The tour kicked off in November 2012 and concluded in March 2013. The tour was taken across the world with the group performing in Russia, India, and South Africa for the first time. Tickets sold out in minutes and due to extremely high demand, additional shows were added. Part of the tour saw the trio play three nights at Stockholm's Friends Arena, performing to over 100,000 people across the three nights of November 2012. This marked their first performances on Swedish soil.

Until Now was released on 22 October 2012, exactly two years after the release of their first compilation album Until One. It contained "Save the World", "Antidote", "Greyhound" and "Don't You Worry Child", plus the singles from Until One along with songs and remixes from the individual group members and other DJs. The album also contained two exclusive Swedish House Mafia remixes, of Coldplay's "Every Teardrop Is a Waterfall", and Usher's "Euphoria". The album charted in the top twenties in various countries across Europe, North America, and Oceania including number 3 in Sweden, as well as charting number 1 on both the British and Irish compilation album charts. Until Now has since been certified Gold in Australia, plus Platinum in both the United Kingdom and Sweden.

On 11 December 2012, Swedish House Mafia announced that they would throw a Black Tie Rave on 28 February 2013 at the Hammerstein Ballroom in New York City to benefit Hurricane Sandy relief, with 100 percent of the net proceeds going to Hurricane Sandy relief efforts. The proceeds benefited both the Mayor's Fund to Advance New York City and the Hurricane Sandy New Jersey Relief Fund.

The group made their final appearance together at the Ultra Music Festival in 2013, rounding off their final tour. On night one, Friday 15 March, they were the opening acts and on the final night, Sunday 24 March, they closed the show ending with the phrase "We Came, We Raved, We Loved" appearing on-screen, which became the mantra of the whole tour. During this performance frequent collaborator John Martin joined the trio on stage to give his farewells and performed their songs "Save the World" and "Don't You Worry Child" which ended in a huge crowd singalong which Billboard described as "a powerful ending [for the] three-DJ Juggernauts".

=== 2014–2017: Leave the World Behind documentary and Work during hiatus ===
After the end of their One Last Tour, it was confirmed that the group would create a second documentary called Leave the World Behind, which was released in select theatres during spring 2014. It was officially premiered at SXSW film festival on 27 March. "Leave the World Behind" was made available for rental and purchase on iTunes and released on Blu-ray and DVD on 2 September 2014.

All three DJs also continued their solo careers, with some of their most notable singles include: "Center of the Universe," "Wasted Love," "Dark River," "I Am", "Reload", and "Children of the Wild". Steve Angello released his debut studio album on 22 January 2016 entitled Wild Youth, charting number 20 in Sweden. In June 2014, Axwell and Sebastian Ingrosso performed together at the Governors Ball Music Festival in New York City, debuting their new collective Axwell Λ Ingrosso. Since then, the duo have released many new singles such as "Something New", "More Than You Know", and "Sun Is Shining", the latter achieving number 1 in Sweden. On 8 December 2017, the group released their debut studio album More Than You Know, which consists of all their previous music and peaked at number 12 on the Swedish album charts. Steve Angello's second studio album, Human, was released on 27 April 2018, a month after the group's reunion at Ultra Miami 2018.

=== 2018–2019: Reunion and Save the World Reunion Tour ===
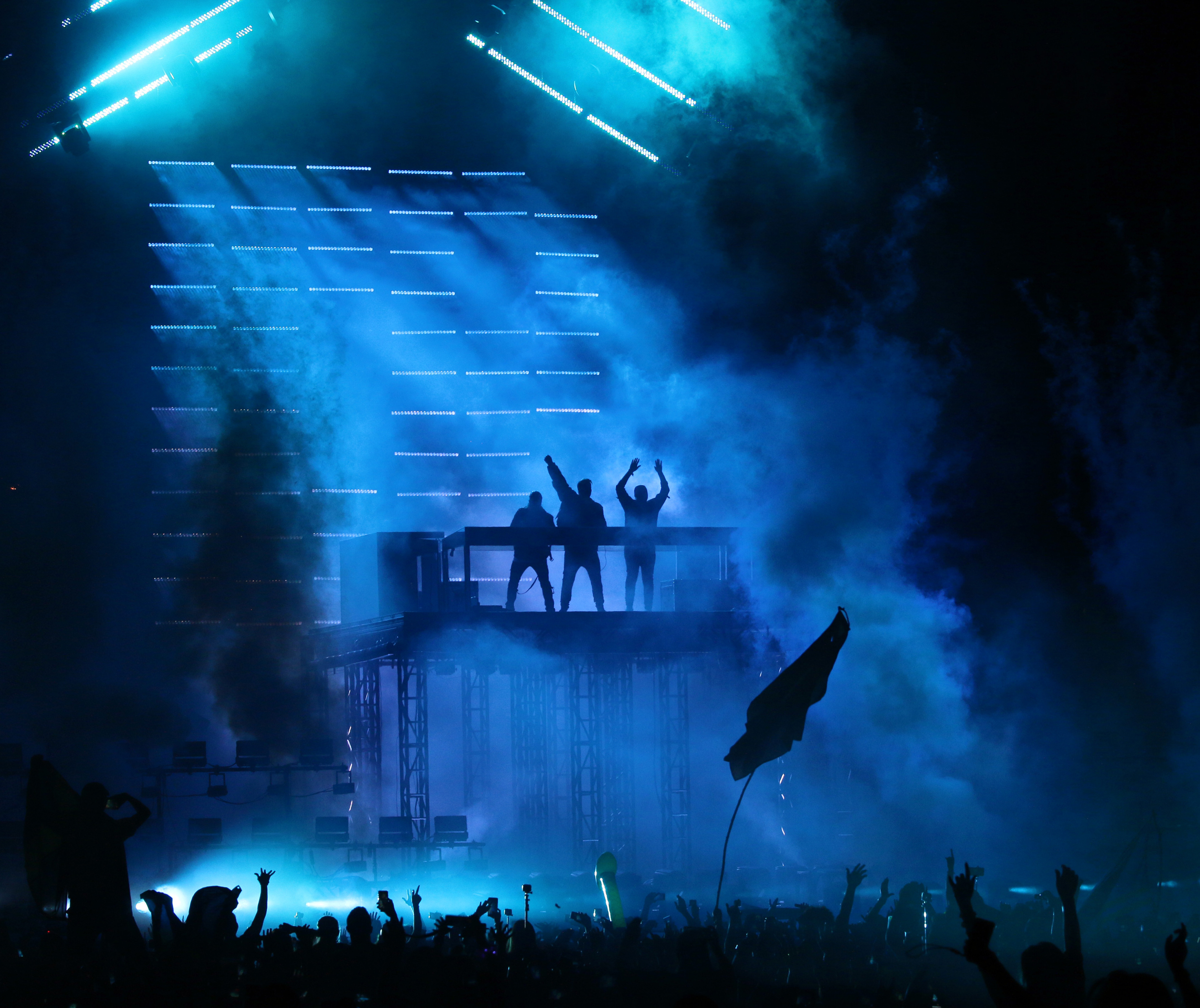
Swedish House Mafia reunited at Ultra Miami 2018

On 25 March 2018, Swedish House Mafia were confirmed to be playing at Ultra Miami 2018 with the announcement being made by the German edition of DJ Mag only 24 hours before the performance. 2018 marked the festival's 10th anniversary and five years since the group split up at Ultra Miami 2013, marking the conclusion of the group's One Last Tour. The set started after a 30-minute production break with their opening song "Miami 2 Ibiza" and Axwell announcing, "My name is Axwell, this is Sebastian Ingrosso, and this is Steve Angello, and Miami, you know that we are the Swedish House Mafia." Both music from the Swedish House Mafia and the individual artist's solo projects, old and new, were played including their massive hits "Save the World" and "Don't You Worry Child" which, like in 2013, ended with a huge crowd singalong. The performance ended with an encore of "One (Your Name)" mixed with "Dream Bigger" and Axwell announcing, "It's Swedish House Mafia for life this time.", possibly hinting on the trio's future. Billboard described it as one of Miami's historical musical experiences.

The Swedish House Mafia logo from 2018 onwards

During an Axwell Λ Ingrosso show held in New York on 27 May 2018, the duo teased a Swedish House Mafia tour for 2019, with Axwell asking, "What do we do now? This is a big move. This has never happened before. Should we cancel the Swedish House Mafia gig we're planning next year? We are not sure they are ready for Swedish House Mafia in 2019," to the crowd before closing the set. This was later confirmed by Steve Angello in an interview with Sydsvenskan saying, "It's happening, obviously... Not all the details are set, but we will be back in 2019." On 15 August 2018, Angello confirmed that the trio were working on new music during an interview with Swedish news publication Dagens Nyheter. The same month also saw Axwell Λ Ingrosso go on hiatus in order to focus on the Swedish House Mafia reunion. Angello also confirmed a show in Mexico for the 2019 tour plus stating that Swedish House Mafia would play Tomorrowland 2019 "by any means necessary". On 20 October, Swedish House Mafia re-entered the DJ Mag top 100 DJs chart, achieving place number 63. The same day they announced that shows in Stockholm would occur as part of their 2019 tour. On 22 October, after teasing an announcement on their website, Swedish House Mafia confirmed that their Stockholm show would occur on 4 May 2019 at the Tele2 Arena. The succeeding week saw two more dates, 3 and 2 May, added due to high demand for the show. On 8 November through a Twitter post and after several teaser billboards located around Mexico City were seen throughout the week, Swedish House Mafia confirmed their Mexico show to happen on 18 May 2019 at Mexico City's Foro Sol. This is the second confirmed stop for their tour. On 28 November, Swedish House Mafia announced another four dates to their 2019 tour. The supergroup announced that they would play Tinderbox, Stavernfestivalen, Frequency Festival, and Creamfields in the summer of 2019. The supergroup would headline Creamfields 2019's event, closing the show on 25 August. This is their first UK show since 2012.

On 11 April 2019, Swedish House Mafia's 2010 single "One" was voted the most iconic EDM song of all time in a 15th anniversary poll by Tomorrowland. Later that month it was announced that an orchestral rework of "One", performed by Jacob Mühlrad, would premiere on 2 May at the Tele2 Arena and become the central song of the tour. In April, a one-night residency in Ushuaïa was also announced as part of their tour.

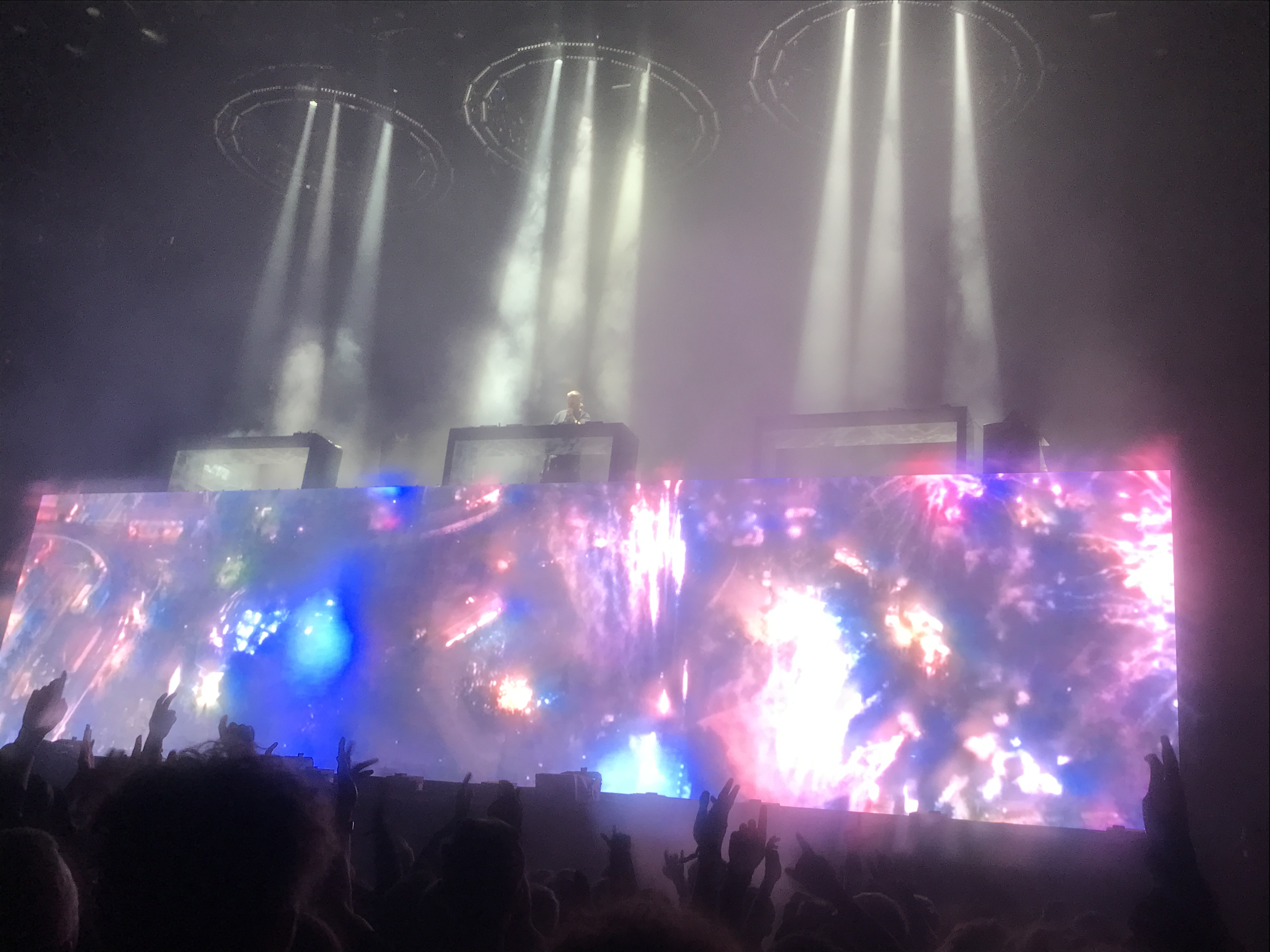
Swedish House Mafia at Tinderbox during the tour

On 2 May 2019, Swedish House Mafia played the first of three shows at the Tele2 Arena in Stockholm as part of their 2019 tour — to be named Save the World, after their 2011 single of the same name. The three nights saw a new stage design featuring wall-to-wall projection and a platform built into the stage. Their setup also changed adding drum samplers manned by Ingrosso and a synthesizer manned by Axwell on opposite sides of the stage, whilst Angello was in the middle with CDJs and all three meeting in the middle to a DJ. Approximately 120,000 people saw the group's first show since Ultra Miami 2018. Building on the promise of new music, two new IDs were played during the event. One, which has been given the working title "Underneath It All" featuring Mike Posner was expected to be their next single.

British EDM and Clubbing magazine Mixmag described the event as a "historic comeback show" and one met with "deafening cheers" from the fans. On 18 May, the group played their second tour venue at Mexico City's Foro Sol, with Groove Cartel describing it as "another great show of the monumental tour". This is their last concert venue of the tour before starting the festival venues in June. Swedish House Mafia were forced to cancel their show at Ultra Korea on 9 June due to "unforeseen circumstances", with cancellation rumours also arising for the rest of their tour due to an alleged deal with Live Nation Entertainment. However such rumors were quickly suppressed by Steve Angello.

Swedish House Mafia returned to the festival scene by closing Tinderbox on 29 June. They also performed at the Open'er Festival in 2019 which was their first show in Poland. A day after performing at Stavernfestivalen on 12 July 2019, Swedish House Mafia teased a new track "Frankenstein" in collaboration with ASAP Rocky on Instagram. On 14 July, the track received its official debut at Ultra Europe 2019.

Throughout the summer of 2019, heavy rumours circulated that Swedish House Mafia would close the 2019 edition of Tomorrowland, breaking Martin Garrix's streak of closing the festival. Tomorrowland themselves added fuel to the fire with having Swedish House Mafia-related easter eggs appear on their website, with online articles 'confirming' the rumours. Despite Swedish House Mafia never confirming Tomorrowland as part of their tour, the closing act of Sunday was kept in secret with the line up only showing Swedish House Mafia's signature "three dots". The three dots however turned out to be that of 3 Are Legend who ended up closing the festival on both weekends, leaving many fans to believe that the group cancelled the show on the last minute.

On 19 July, Swedish House Mafia were forced to cancel their show at Weekend Festival due to "production issues". A week later the group played during a one-night residency at Ushuaïa, Ibiza, to which they perform a special afterparty. After performing at Zurich's Open Air festival, Swedish House Mafia returned to the UK to close Creamfields on 25 August 2019 – their first UK performance in seven years. The group occupied the festival's Arc Stage for the whole day, requiring that time to set up the elaborate pyrotechnics for their 90-minute show. Their performance in front of 80,000 fans was met with much anticipation and excitement especially after rumors of cancellation.

At the end of the show the group teased a new date, on the day before their next scheduled show, prompting further excitement from fans. It is rumored to be either new music or the confirmation of a global stadium tour, which have both been alluded to by the group. The announcement ended up being a contest for 33 Lifetime Passes which get fans free access to every show, exclusive merch, and other Swedish House Mafia-related events. On 20 September 2019 Swedish House Mafia ended their tour with the opening of the 2019 Singapore Grand Prix to a crowd of 45,000 people. The show, being their first in Asia since One Last Tour, ended with Axwell describing the crowd as "the best in Asia".

=== 2019–present: Paradise Again ===
In December 2019, it was announced that Swedish House Mafia would perform at Diriyah Season Festival in Saudi Arabia – their first show since the reunion tour. On 11 December, the Official Charts Company released their chart of the decade which saw the supergroup's 2012 hit "Don't You Worry Child" come 81st.

In February 2021, videos were published by the group's art director Alexander Wessely and from manager Max Holmstrand, showing the members of Swedish House Mafia supposedly working on new music and are rumored to have an EP coming. A month later it was announced that the supergroup had parted ways with Columbia Records.

In April 2021, it was announced that Swedish House Mafia signed with Wassim "Sal" Slaiby as their manager after splitting with Columbia Records and Patriot Management. It was also speculated that they have signed with Universal Music Group after the trio was added to their website and a song titled "Not Yesterday" was registered on ASCAP featuring writing credits for long time SHM collaborators Vargas & Lagola as well as 070 Shake.

On 15 July 2021, Swedish House Mafia announced that they had signed to Republic Records, and released their new track "It Gets Better", also announcing that they would release their debut studio album, Paradise Again, in late 2021. The group's reunion followed after they had resolved behind-the-scenes problems and label and management changes, aided by fellow Swedish artist Desembra, a DJ discovered by Ingrosso, who "helped the guys steer themselves toward common ground". A lot of expectation was created with the appearance of mysterious billboards only with the date and the SHM logo across the globe. They then released "Lifetime", featuring Ty Dolla Sign and 070 Shake, on 19 July 2021 before performing a medley of "Lifetime" and "It Gets Better" on The Tonight Show the same day.

In October 2021, Swedish House Mafia were named in the Pandora Papers. According to SVT, they had formed a company in the British Virgin Islands to manage ownership of various recordings released by the group, as well as its name and logo. This reportedly included the rights to the songs "Don't You Worry Child", and "Save the World".

On 21 October 2021, they released the single "Moth to a Flame" with the Weeknd. The group released the version of "One" that Jacob Mühlrad composed for the Save the World Tour, officially titled "One Symphony", on New Year's Day 2022. Paradise Again was rescheduled to and released on 15 April 2022.

In 2022, the group also received credit for co-writing and co-producing "Sacrifice" and "How Do I Make You Love Me?" off of the Weeknd's fifth studio album Dawn FM, on which 'Moth to a Flame' was featured on the Alternate World edition of the album.

The group also performed at the opening ceremony of the 2023 FIFA Club World Cup on 12 December 2023 in Jeddah, Saudi Arabia alongside Busta Rhymes.

In January 2024, Tomorrowland announced Swedish House Mafia will be performing at the 20 year anniversary festival called "Life".

In mid-2026, the distribution rights of their music catalog under Virgin/EMI were acquired by BMG.

== Members ==
=== Current ===
==== Axwell (2008–2013; 2018–present) ====
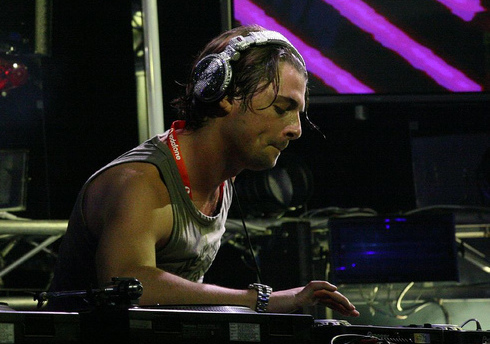
Axwell in 2007

Axwell (born 18 December 1977) placed at number 12 on the DJ Magazine Top 100 DJ Poll in 2011. In late 2004, Axwell released a global hit, "Feel the Vibe", which was re-released under Ministry of Sound in 2005 with added vocals from Tara McDonald as "Feel the Vibe ('Til the Morning Comes)". In the spring of 2006, Axwell and Steve Angello, under the Supermode alias, remixed Bronski Beat's "Smalltown Boy", producing "Tell Me Why". In August 2007, Axwell teamed up with performer Max'C to create the track "I Found U", which peaked #6 in the UK Singles Chart. Axwell has been producing remixes for other artists—mixes have included Usher's "Burn" (BMG), Room 5's "Make Luv" (Positiva), Clipse & Faith Evans "Ma, I Don't Love Her" (RCA), Stonebridge's "Put 'Em High" (Hed Kandi), N*E*R*D's single "Maybe" (Virgin), and more recently Hard-Fi's "Hard to Beat", Deep Dish's "Dreams", Pharrell's "Angel", Nelly Furtado's "Promiscuous" and Madonna's "Jump". In 2012, Axwell released the 'Axwell Mix' of the progressive house track, "In My Mind", which was originally released by Ivan Gough and Feenixpawl through Axtone. The mix would eventually go on to become a global success.

==== Steve Angello (2008–2013; 2018–present) ====
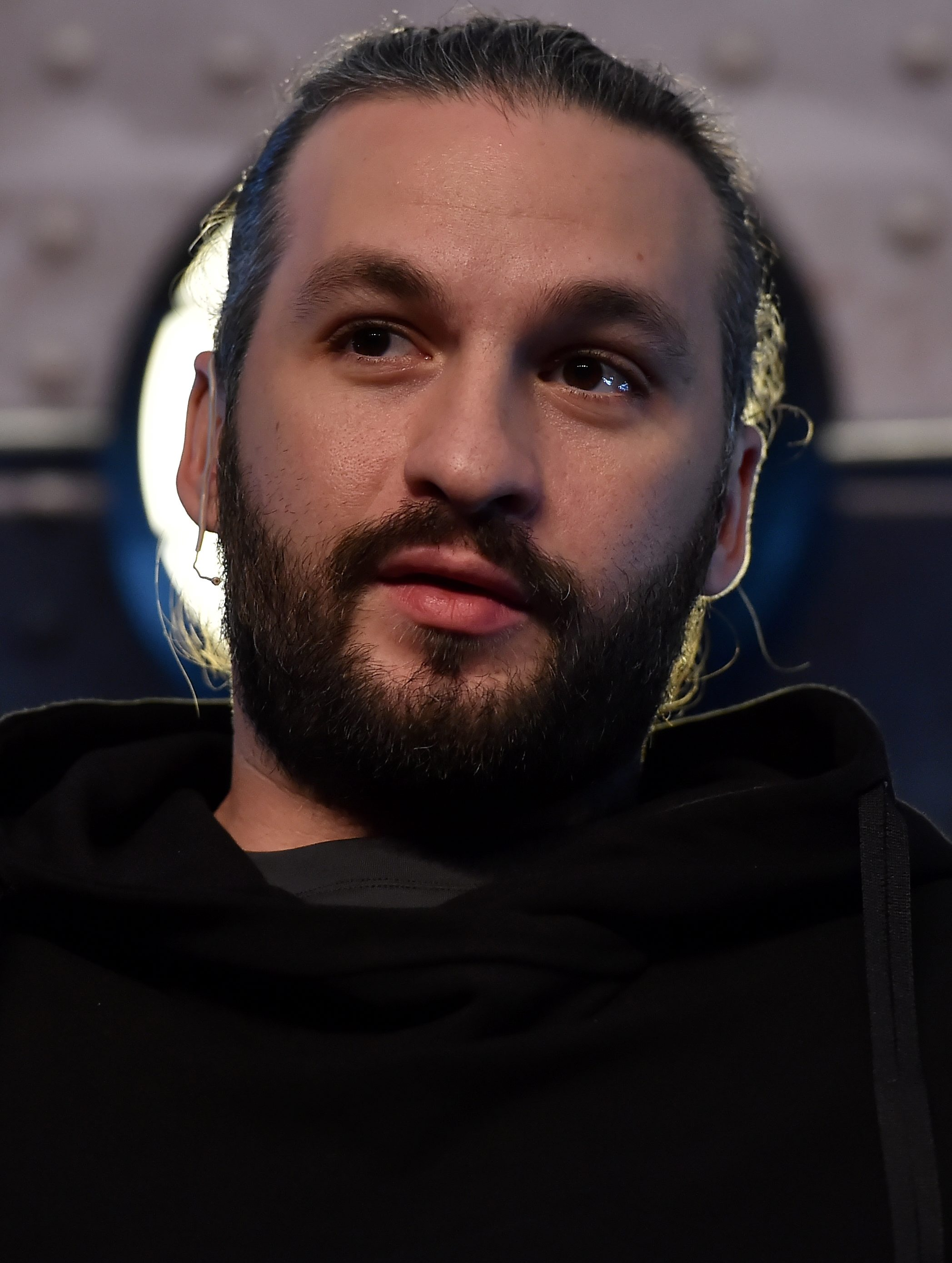
Steve Angello in 2015

Steve Angello (born 22 November 1982) placed at number 23 on the DJ Magazine Top 100 DJ Poll 2011. Steve Angello's claim to fame came when he released his remix of Eurythmics "Sweet Dreams" in late 2004. In 2007 his remix with Laidback Luke of "Show Me Love" by Robin S. was released on Data Records. Angello produces under several different aliases. On his own, he has called himself Who's Who. He often works closely with his childhood friend Sebastian Ingrosso on many projects. Aside from DJing together, they have also produced under the names Buy Now, Fireflies, General Moders, Mode Hookers, Outfunk, and The Sinners. Most recently, they released "Bodycrash" under their Buy Now alias, sampling the 1978 disco hit "Let's All Chant" by the Michael Zager group. The track was first played by Pete Tong on his Radio 1 show in late 2007. Eventually, the Dirty South remix of the tune leaked out onto the Internet in January 2008. The track has since received a much larger release via Positiva Records, also including the Laidback Luke remix. He has produced with Eric Prydz under the name A&P Project. Also, he has created a track with his friend Axwell under the name Supermongo, later renamed Supermode. They made a cover of an old Bronski Beat track, calling it "Tell Me Why". This was released via Ministry of Sound's Data Records imprint in summer 2006. Steve Angello's productions can mainly be classified as house ("Summer Noize"), progressive house ("Yeah"), tech house ("Partouze") and electro house ("Raining Again"). He also owns his own record label, Size Records. Angello's brother, Antoine Josefsson, is a DJ and a producer who goes by the name AN21. Together they have released the tracks "Valodja", "Flonko" & "Swing N Swoosh".

==== Sebastian Ingrosso (2008–2013; 2018–present) ====
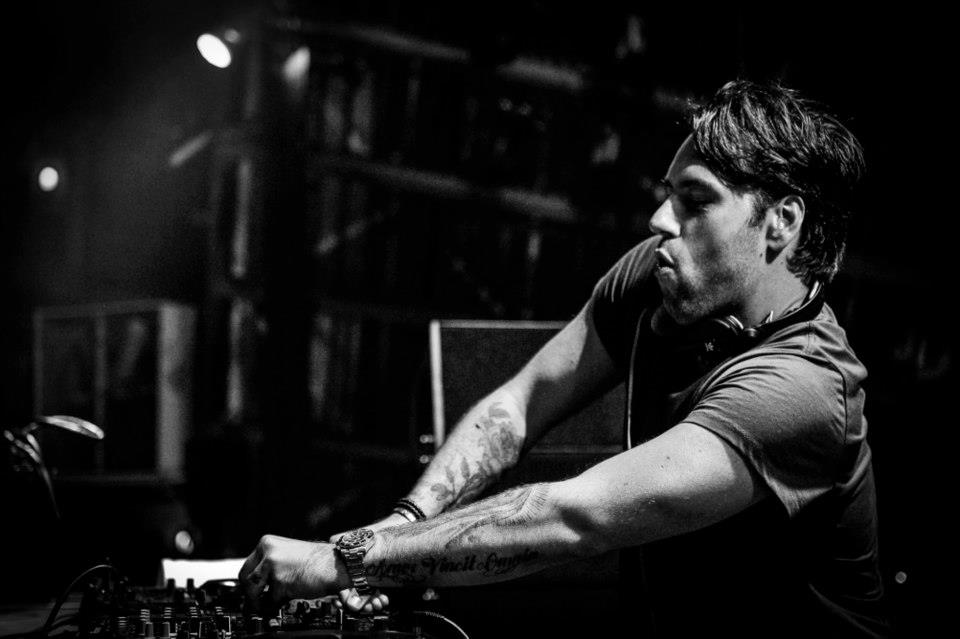
Sebastian Ingrosso in 2013

Sebastian Ingrosso (born 20 April 1983) ranked at number 26 in 2011 on DJ Magazine Top 100 DJ list, ranked at number 18 in 2013, and won the award for the highest new entry into the chart in 2009, a record beaten only by Deadmau5 into the 2008 Top 100 DJ list at number 11. In 2009, Sebastian Ingrosso saw the releases of Laktos, Kidsos, Echo Vibes and Meich (with Dirty South) on his own imprint Refune, "How Soon Is Now" (featuring Julie McKnight with David Guetta and Dirty South) and the vocal stormer House anthem "Leave the World Behind" together with Axwell, Steve Angello and Laidback Luke, with Deborah Cox on vocals. He has co-written and co-produced the track "Cupid Boy" on the Kylie Minogue album Aphrodite along with Magnus Lidehäll, Nick Clow and Luciana Caporaso. Ingrosso has also produced tracks for Lazee ("Rock Away") and Kid Sister ("Right Hand Hi" with Steve Angello). Remixed artists during the years include Justin Timberlake, Moby, Röyksopp, Hard-Fi and Deep Dish. In 2012, Sebastian Ingrosso released his early summer anthem of 2011 "Calling" with Alesso. The following year, a vocal version of the anthem was released in August featuring Ryan Tedder of OneRepublic, titled Calling (Lose My Mind). The song reached number 2 on Beatport's Top 10. His latest single with Tommy Trash, "Reload", was released in 2012, and then a vocal version featuring John Martin in June 2013.

=== Former ===
==== Eric Prydz (2008) ====
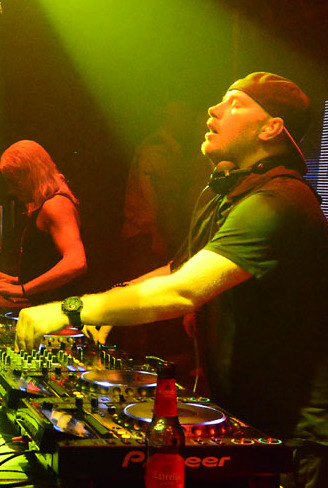
Eric Prydz in 2012

Eric Sheridan Prydz (born 19 July 1976), known for his 2004 hit single "Call on Me", rose to fame with the song and saw continued chart success with "Proper Education" in 2007, and "Pjanoo" in 2008. In 2016, he released his debut studio album, Opus. In 2017, he won DJ of the Year at the Electronic Music Awards and was also nominated for Live Act of the Year. Although the "Call on Me" track made him immensely popular, Prydz has stopped playing it in his shows in an attempt to distance himself from it. In 2008, Prydz released the critically acclaimed single "Pjanoo", which topped the UK Dance Chart. Together with Axwell, Sebastian Ingrosso and Steve Angello, Prydz formed a group of DJs that informally referred to themselves as the Swedish House Mafia. When the group with the same name officially formed in late 2008, Prydz decided not to join his friends. He has collaborated with Axwell under the name AxEr and with Angello as A&P Project. In 2009, Prydz released "Miami to Atlanta", where the "Pryda snare" was first used. The Pryda snare is a popular technique in house and trance music consisting of using a compressed and sustained snare sample at the end of a bar. Commonly used to mark progressions in a song structure, it has been widely sampled in the electronic dance music world, notably by producers such as Martin Garrix, Dimitri Vegas & Like Mike, and W&W. On 21 May 2012, Prydz released his debut artist album, Eric Prydz Presents Pryda, as a 3-disc album on Virgin Records (Astralwerks in the USA). Disc 1 is made up of new unreleased Pryda productions, which some fans may have heard as works in progress (including Shadows, Agag, Mighty Love, Allein and the intro edit of Pjanoo). Discs 2 and 3 bring together many of the classic tracks from the Pryda catalogue, sequenced and continuously mixed by Prydz himself, including some of his special re-edits.

== Legacy ==
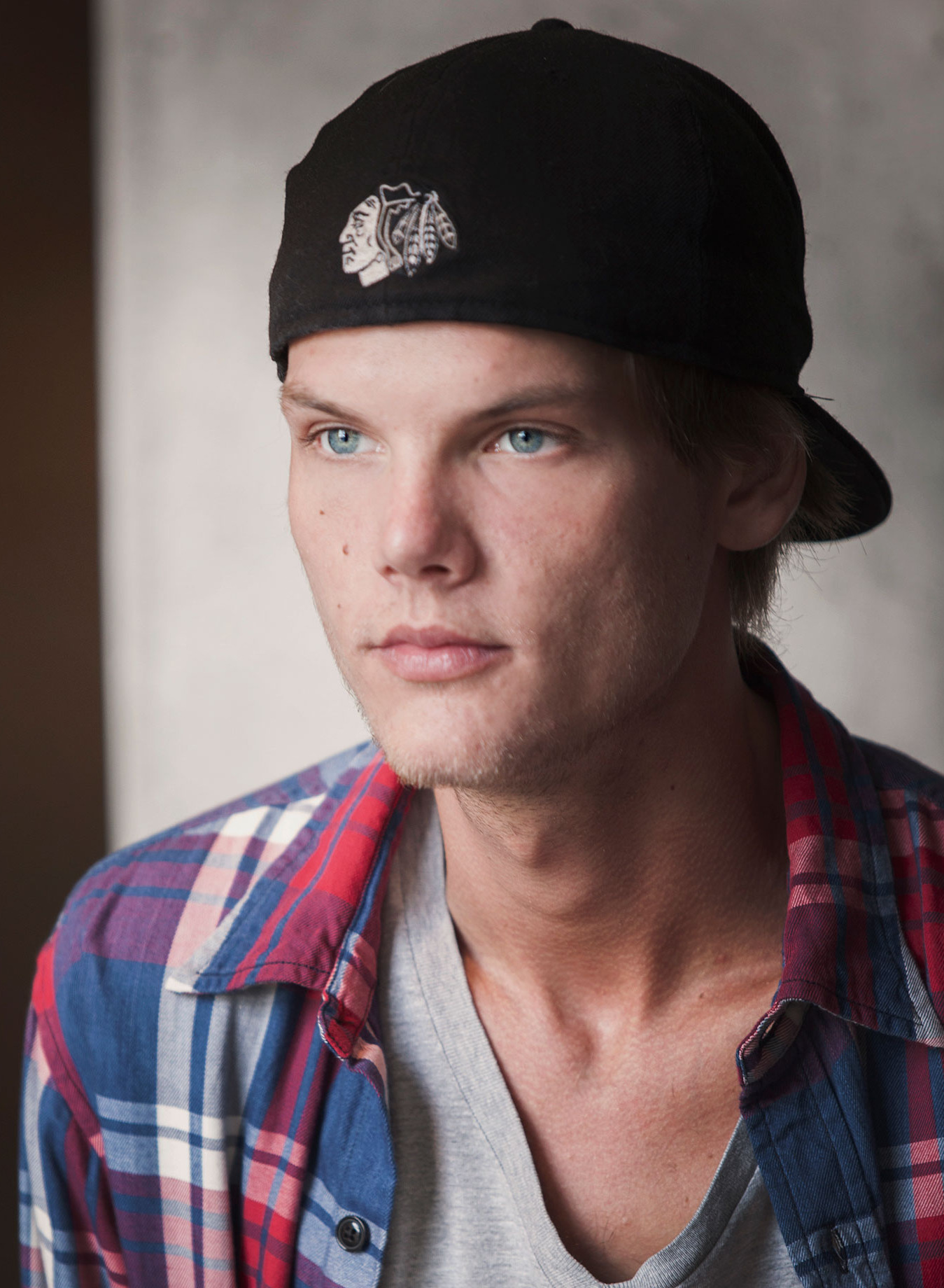
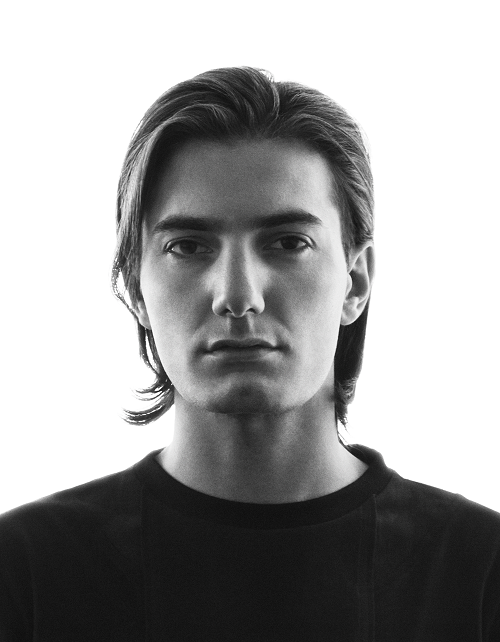
Swedish House Mafia's music has influenced artists such as Avicii and Alesso.

The Swedish supergroup are said to have inspired many musicians in the EDM genre, including fellow Swedish DJs Alesso and Avicii. They are also credited with increasing the popularity of house music in the United States in the late 2000s. On 23 April 2018, it was revealed by Tiësto that Swedish House Mafia's Ultra Music reunion inspired Avicii to take up DJing again, which saw him through his final weeks until he died by suicide on 20 April. Dutch DJ Martin Garrix is also a self-confessed "fanboy" of Swedish House Mafia, saying he has "deep appreciation" for them and citing Sebastian Ingrosso especially as a mentor to him.

They have also been recognized by multiple music publications as a group that has had a major influence on EDM genre. Billboard's David Rishty praised the trio, saying, "Their dazzling pioneers and groundbreaking moves not only inspired producers to come, but also paved the way for countless dance artists. And they did it all with fewer than a dozen records and just one radio hit."

NME's Ali Shutler writes, "Swedish House Mafia are the rockstars of the dance music world, and they sure as hell talk a good game. A collaboration between the established and wildly successful DJs Axwell, Steve Angello and Sebastian Ingrosso, the supergroup first announced themselves in 2008 and quickly changed the world of popular music forever. In 2010 they broke through with the singles 'One' and the Tinie Tempah-featuring 'Miami 2 Ibiza' as their pulsating, progressive take on house music spearheaded an EDM boom that dominated the mainstream for the next decade. Bangers like 'Save The World' and 'Don't You Worry Child' inspired a generation of teenagers to abandon the mosh-pit in favour of raves." He stated.

Paper's Claire Valentine writes, "Swedish House Mafia's success was both a marker of the outsized impact electronic music had on the popular music landscape of the mid 2010s and undeniable proof that the four-on-the-floor beats plus an inspirational bromide formula the trio perfected was a near-universal crowd pleaser. Songs like "Don't You Worry Child," "Save the World" and "One" dominated airwaves and filled booming club speakers from Miami to Ibiza, bringing heaps of fame and money to the three DJ/producers who made up the supergroup."

== Discography ==
- Paradise Again (2022)

== Tours ==
- Take One Tour (2009–2010)
- One Last Tour (2012–2013)
- Save the World Reunion Tour (2019)
- Paradise Again World Tour (2022)
- Latin America Tour (2023)

== See also ==
- Popular music in Sweden
