= Axwell discography =

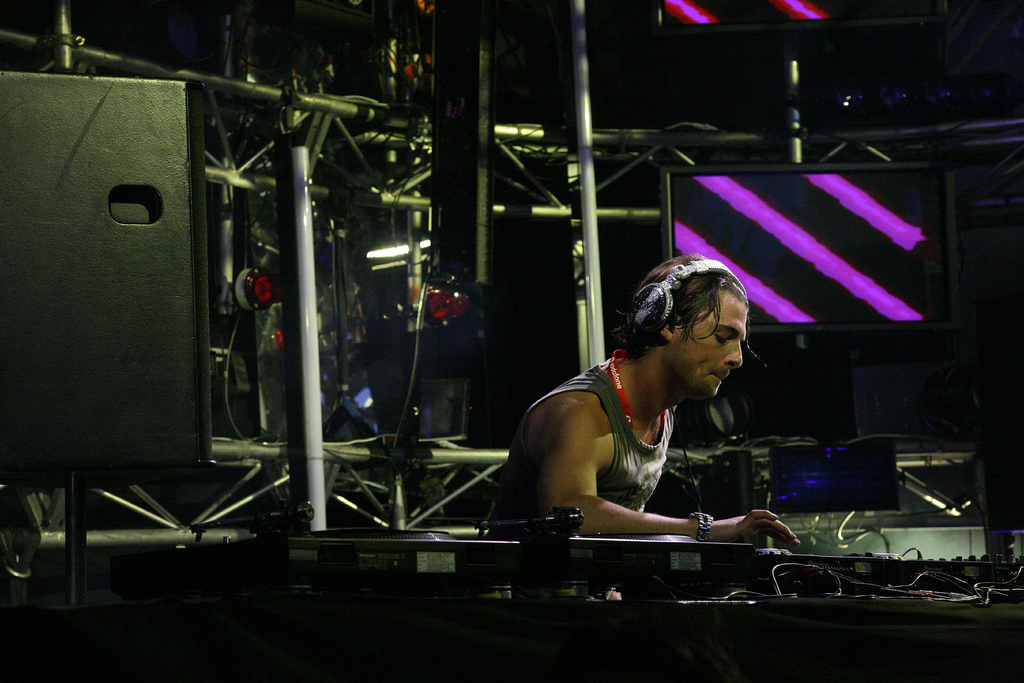
DJ Axwell as spotted during a show in Melbourne Central

The discography of Swedish DJ Axwell consists of two compilation albums, a remix album, an EP and nineteen singles. His discography as a member in the Swedish DJ supergroup Swedish House Mafia is more extensive as it includes two platinum-certified studio albums among other works. Axwell released his debut compilation album on 21 November 2008 via Blanco Y Negro. His second compilation album was released two years later via his own record label Axtone Records, on 13 June 2010.

== Compilation albums ==
List of compilation albums
Title	Album details
Superdeejays	Released: 21 November 2008; Label: Blanco Y Negro; Format: CD, digital download
Axwell Presents Axtone Vol. 1	Released: 13 June 2010; Label: Axtone; Format: CD, digital download

== Remix albums ==
List of remix albums
Title	Album details
Axwell Presents Axtone Acapellas Vol. 1	Released: 4 January 2010; Label: Axtone; Format: CD, digital download

== Extended plays ==
Title	EP details
Tranquility	Released: 1995; Label: Cosmic One; Format: 12" vinyl

== Singles ==
List of singles as lead artist, with selected chart positions, showing year released and album name
Title	Year	Peak chart positions										Certifications	Album
Title	Year	SWE	AUS	BEL	FRA	GER	ITA	IRE	NLD	SPA	UK	Certifications	Album
"Feel the Vibe" (featuring Tara McDonald)	2005	—	61	53	—	—	—	38	62	—	16		Axtone Vol.1
"Together" (Note: "Together" was later featured on Axwell Λ Ingrosso's debut EP X4.) (with Sebastian Ingrosso)	2005	—	—	—	—	—	—	—	—	—	—		Axtone Vol.1
"Watch the Sunrise" (featuring Steve Edwards)	2006	—	—	—	—	—	—	—	89	—	70		Axtone Vol.1
"I Found U" (featuring Max'C)	2007	—	—	59	—	—	—	49	10	19	6		Axtone Vol.1
"Get Dumb" (with Angello, Ingrosso and Laidback Luke)	2007	—	—	—	—	—	—	—	45	—	—		Until One
"It's True" (Note: "It's True" is also a single from Salem Al Fakir's debut studio album This Is Who I Am.) (with Sebastian Ingrosso vs. Salem Al Fakir)	2007	38	—	—	—	—	—	—	64	—	—		Axtone Vol.1
"Submariner"	2007	—	—	—	—	—	—	—	—	—	—		Axtone Vol.1
"What a Wonderful World" (with Bob Sinclar featuring Ron Carroll)	2008	18	—	57	—	—	—	—	14	—	48		Born in 69
"Open Your Heart" (with Dirty South featuring Rudy)	2008	—	—	—	—	—	—	—	21	—	—		Axtone Vol.1
"Leave the World Behind" (with Ingrosso, Angello and Laidback Luke featuring Deborah Cox)	2009	39	—	64	—	—	—	—	75	—	—		Axtone Vol.1, Until One and Until Now
"Nothing but Love" (featuring Errol Reid)	2010	39	—	85	—	—	—	—	91	—	—		Non-album singles
"Heart Is King"	2011	—	—	90	—	—	—	—	—	—	—		Non-album singles
"Roar" (with Sebastian Ingrosso)	2013	—	—	114	—	—	—	—	—	—	—		Monsters University
"Center of the Universe" (with Magnus Carlson)	2013	39	—	61	193	—	—	—	—	—	113		Non-album singles
"I Am" (with Sick Individuals featuring Taylr Renee)	2013	—	—	92	—	—	—	—	—	—	—		Non-album singles
"Waiting for So Long (Gloria)"	2015	—	—	—	—	—	—	—	—	—	—		Non-album singles
"Barricade"	2016	— (Note: "Barricade" did not enter the Swedish Singles Chart, but peaked at number two on the Swedish Heatseeker chart.)	—	—	—	—	—	—	—	—	—		More Than You Know
"Belong" (with Shapov)	2016	78	—	—	—	—	—	—	—	—	—	FIMI: Gold	Non-album single
"Nobody Else"	2018	—	—	—	—	—	—	—	—	—	—		Non-album single
"—" denotes a recording that did not chart or was not released in that territory.

== Remixes ==
List of remixes, showing original artists and year released
Title	Original artist(s)	Year	Peak chart positions		Album
Title	Original artist(s)	Year	AUS	NLD	Album
"Love Is" (Axwell's Drinkmix)	Elena Valente	2000	—	—	Non-album remixes
"Back In My Arms" (Axwell Remix)	Juni Juliet	2000	—	—	Non-album remixes
"Sodapop" (Axwell Edit)	Lutricia McNeal	2000	—	—	Non-album remixes
"Dolce Marmellata" (Axwell's Mixed Grill)	Domenicer	2000	—	—	Non-album remixes
"Summer Breeze" (Axwell Remix)	Latin Trinity	2001	—	—	Non-album remixes
"L.O.V.E." (Axwell Vocal Slammer)	Cape	2001	—	—	Non-album remixes
"Los Americanos" (Axwell Remix)	Murcielago	2001	—	—	Non-album remixes
"El Bimbo Latino" (Axwell Vocal Mix)	Love Selective	2001	—	—	Non-album remixes
"Adrenaline" (Axwell's Sombrero Mix)	Mendez	2002	—	—	Non-album remixes
"Join Me Brother" (Axwell Vocal Mix)	Afro Angel	2002	—	—	Non-album remixes
"Destiny" (Axwell Remix)	The Attic	2003	—	—	Non-album remixes
"Libre" (Axwell Vocal Mix)	Mambana	2003	—	—	Non-album remixes
"Feelin' Love" (Axwell Vocal Mix)	Soulsearcher	2003	—	—	Non-album remixes
"Better Love" (Axwell Vocal Mix)	Deli pres. Demetreus	2003	—	—	Non-album remixes
"Make Luv" (Axwell Remix)	Room 5	2003	—	—	Non-album remixes
"Felicidad" (Axwell Vocal Mix)	Mambana	2004	—	—	Non-album remixes
"Jump" (Axwell Remix)	Madonna	2006	—	—	Non-album remixes
"Slipping Away (Crier la Vie)" (Axwell Remix)	Moby and Mylène Farmer	2006	—	—	Non-album remixes
"2 Million Ways" (Axwell Remix)	C-Mos	2006	—	—	Non-album remixes
"Music Matters" (Axwell Remix)	Faithless	2007	—	—	Non-album remixes
"Let It Go" (Axwell Remix)	Dirty South featuring Rudy	2007	—	—	Non-album remixes
"Ghostbusters Theme" (Axwell & Mankz Remix)	Ray Parker Jr.	2007	—	—	Non-album remixes
"Been A Long Time" (Axwell Remode Mix)	TV Rock featuring Rudy	2008	—	—	Non-album remixes
"Rotterdam City of Love" (Axwell Re-edit)	Miss Melody and Abel Ramos	2008	—	—	Non-album remixes
"In the Air" (Axwell Remix)	TV Rock featuring Rudy	2009	—	—	Until One
"Walk with Me" (Axwell vs. Daddy's Groove Remix)	Prok & Fitch pres. Nanchang Nancy	2010	—	—	Until One
"Nothing but Love" (Axwell vs. Daddy's Groove Remix)	Axwell featuring Errol Reid	2010	—	—	Non-album remix
"Teenage Crime" (Axwell Remix)	Adrian Lux	2010	—	—	Non-album remix
"Teenage Crime" (Axwell & Henrik B Remode)	Adrian Lux	2010	—	—	Until One
"Blow Up" (Thomas Gold vs. Axwell Remix)	Hard Rock Sofa and St. Brothers	2011	—	—	Non-album remixes
"One Look" (Axwell vs. Dimitri Vegas & Like Mike Remix)	David Tort featuring Gosha	2011	—	—	Non-album remixes
"Resurrection" (Axwell's Recut Club Version)	Michael Calfan	2011	—	—	Until Now
"In My Mind" (Axwell Mix)	Ivan Gough and Feenixpawl featuring Georgi Kay	2012	29	37	Until Now
"Falling" (Axwell Edit)	Discopolis	2013	—	—	Non-album remixes
"Feel The Pressure" (Axwell & NEW ID Remix)	Mutiny UK and Steve Mac featuring Nate James	2014	—	—	Non-album remixes
"Feel The Pressure" (Axwell & NEW ID WTP Mix)	Mutiny UK and Steve Mac featuring Nate James	2014	—	—	Non-album remixes
"Tokyo By Night" (Axwell Remix)	Hook N Sling featuring Karin Park	2014	—	—	Non-album remixes
"Mantra" (Axwell Cut)	Michael Feiner	2016	—	—	Non-album remixes
"Dark River" (Axwell Remode)	Sebastian Ingrosso	2016	—	—	Non-album remixes
"Belong" (Axwell & Years Remode)	Axwell & Shapov	2016	—	—	Non-album remixes
"Make Your Mind Up" (Axwell & NEW ID Remode)	Pauls Paris	2017	—	—	Non-album remixes
"Don't Worry" (Axwell Cut)	Redfield	2019	—	—	Non-album remixes
"All Day and Night" (Axwell Remix)	Jax Jones and Martin Solveig featuring Madison Beer	2019	—	—	Non-album remixes
"Graveyard" (Axwell Remix)	Halsey	2019	—	—	Non-album remixes
"Free Again" (Axwell Cut)	Jay Robinson	2021	—	—	Non-album remixes
"—" denotes a recording that did not chart or was not released.

== Songwriting and production credits ==
Title	Credited artist(s)	Year	Album
On and On"	Flo Rida featuring Kevin Rudolf	2010	Only One Flo (Part 1)
"Wild Ones"	Flo Rida featuring Sia	2011	Wild Ones
"Let It Roll"	Flo Rida	2012	Wild Ones
"Numb"	Usher	2012	Looking 4 Myself
"Euphoria" (Note: Produced with Steve Angello and Sebastian Ingrosso under the name Swedish House Mafia.)	Usher	2012	Looking 4 Myself
"Nothing Can Compare"	Agnes	2019	Nothing Can Compare
"Alice"	Lady Gaga	2020	Chromatica
"Free Woman"	Lady Gaga	2020	Chromatica
"Sine from Above" (with Elton John)	Lady Gaga	2020	Chromatica

== Releases under an alias ==
=== As Supermode (with Steve Angello) ===
Title	Year	Peak chart positions								Album
Title	Year	AUS	BEL	FRA	GER	IRE	NLD	SPA	UK	Album
"Tell Me Why"	2006	48	22	22	65	31	11	19	13	Until One

== See also ==
- Swedish House Mafia discography
- Axwell & Ingrosso discography
- Sebastian Ingrosso discography
- Steve Angello discography
