= Swedish House Mafia discography =

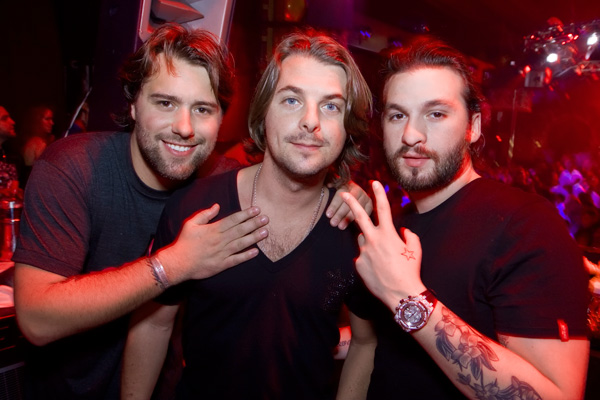
- Swedish House Mafia at Pacha Group, Ibiza in 2011
- Studio albums: 1
- Extended plays: 2
- Live albums: 2
- Compilation albums: 2
- Singles: 17
- Music videos: 9

Swedish progressive house supergroup Swedish House Mafia have released one studio album, two compilation albums, two live albums, two EPs, seventeen singles, and nine music videos. The trio formed during the mid-2000s whilst touring together and assisting each other in music production, and released the single "Leave the World Behind" in 2009, although all were assigned individual artist credits for the song. The group itself rose to prominence after performing a DJ set at the Cream Amnesia nightclub in Ibiza in 2008, and were later signed by record label EMI in 2010. Until One, a compilation album containing both their own material and mixes of songs by other artists, peaked at number 13 in Sweden and in the top ten of the album charts of The Netherlands and the Flanders region of Belgium: two singles, "One" and "Miami 2 Ibiza", both attained chart success across Europe, with the former topping the Dutch Top 40 and the latter reaching the top five of the Flanders chart, Irish Singles Chart and UK Singles Chart. "One" and "Miami 2 Ibiza" were certified septuple and quintuple platinum in Sweden by the International Federation of the Phonographic Industry (IFPI).

The follow-up to Until One, titled Until Now, was released in 2012. Again a compilation containing a mix of their own songs and those by other artists, it peaked at number three in Sweden as well as topping the UK Compilation Chart. Four singles were released from Until Now: "Save the World", "Antidote" – a collaboration with Australian electro house group Knife Party – "Greyhound" and "Don't You Worry Child", with the latter proving to be the most successful: it became their first song to peak at number one in Sweden, and also topped the ARIA Chart and UK Singles Chart. During 2012, the group announced that they would split up following the conclusion of their One Last Tour. Swedish House Mafia reunited in 2018 and their debut album, Paradise Again, was released on 15 April 2022. In collaboration with Canadian singer The Weeknd, the trio released "Moth to a Flame" on 22 October 2021.

== Albums ==
=== Studio albums ===
| Title | Details | Peak chart positions | | | | | | | | |
| Title | Details | SWE | AUS | AUT | BEL (FL) | CAN | NLD | SWI | UK | US |
|---|---|---|---|---|---|---|---|---|---|---|
| Paradise Again | Released: 15 April 2022; Label: Republic; Formats: CD, digital download | 4 | 96 | 59 | 29 | 48 | 9 | 14 | 70 | 121 |

=== Compilation albums ===
List of compilation albums, with selected chart positions, sales figures and certifications
| Title | Details | Peak chart positions | | | | | | | | | | Sales | Certifications |
| Title | Details | SWE | AUS | AUT | BEL (FL) | CAN | GER | NLD | SWI | UK Comp. | US | Sales | Certifications |
|---|---|---|---|---|---|---|---|---|---|---|---|---|---|
| Until One | Released: 22 October 2010 (SWE); Label: Polydor; Formats: CD, digital download | 13 | — | — | 6 | — | — | 8 | 18 | 2 | 139 | US: 57,000 | GLF: Platinum; BPI: Gold |
| Until Now | Released: 19 October 2012 (SWE); Label: Polydor; Formats: CD, digital download | 3 | 10 | 10 | 6 | 7 | 26 | 6 | 7 | 1 | 14 | | GLF: Platinum; ARIA: Gold; BPI: Platinum |
"—" denotes a recording that did not chart or was not released in that territory.

=== Live albums ===
List of live albums
| Title | Details |
|---|---|
| One Night Stand: The Live Album | Released: 27 December 2011 (US); Label: EMI; Formats: CD, digital download |
| One Last Tour: A Live Soundtrack | Released: 15 April 2014 (US); Label: Virgin; Formats: CD, digital download |
| Paradise Again: The Live Album | Released: 28 July 2023 (US); Label: Republic; Formats: Digital download |

== Extended plays ==
List of extended plays
| Title | Details |
|---|---|
| iTunes Festival: London 2011 | Released: 22 July 2011; Label: EMI; Formats: Digital download |
| The Singles | Released: 20 April 2013; Label: Virgin; Formats: Vinyl |

== Singles ==
List of singles as lead artist, with selected chart positions and certifications, showing year released and album name
| Title | Year | Peak chart positions | | | | | | | | | | Certifications | Album |
| Title | Year | SWE | AUS | AUT | BEL (FL) | GER | IRL | NLD | SWI | UK | US | Certifications | Album |
|---|---|---|---|---|---|---|---|---|---|---|---|---|---|
| "One (Your Name)" (featuring Pharrell) | 2010 | 11 | 86 | 25 | 2 | 41 | 7 | 1 | 13 | 7 | — | GLF: 7× Platinum; ARIA: Platinum; BEA: Platinum; BPI: Platinum; BVMI: Gold; NVPI: Platinum; RIAA: Gold | Until One and Until Now |
| "Miami 2 Ibiza" (vs. Tinie Tempah) | 2010 | 10 | 31 | 36 | 3 | 46 | 5 | 10 | 19 | 4 | — | GLF: 5× Platinum; ARIA: 2× Platinum; BPI: 2× Platinum | Until One and Until Now |
| "Save the World" | 2011 | 4 | 62 | 31 | 5 | 37 | 11 | 6 | 26 | 10 | — (Note: "Save the World" did not enter the Billboard Hot 100, but peaked at number five on the Bubbling Under Hot 100 chart.) | GLF: 5× Platinum; ARIA: Platinum; BEA: Gold; BPI: Gold; RIAA: Platinum | Until Now |
| "Antidote" (vs. Knife Party) | 2011 | 17 | 100 | 30 | 35 | 63 | 39 | — (Note: "Antidote" did not enter the Dutch Top 40, but peaked at number eight on the Dutch Tipparade chart.) | 70 | 4 | — | GLF: 3× Platinum; BPI: Silver | Until Now |
| "Greyhound" | 2012 | 6 | 89 | 42 | 9 | 53 | 25 | 18 | 33 | 13 | — | GLF: 7× Platinum; ARIA: Gold; BPI: Gold; RIAA: Gold | Until Now |
| "Don't You Worry Child" (featuring John Martin) | 2012 | 1 | 1 | 5 | 4 | 9 | 2 | 5 | 6 | 1 | 6 | GLF: 9× Platinum; ARIA: 11× Platinum; BEA: Gold; BPI: 4× Platinum; BVMI: 3× Gold; IFPI AUT: Gold; IFPI SWI: Platinum; NVPI: Gold; RIAA: 5× Platinum | Until Now |
| "It Gets Better" | 2021 | 35 | — | — | — | — | — | — | — | — | — | | Paradise Again |
| "Lifetime" (featuring Ty Dolla Sign and 070 Shake) | 2021 | 35 | — | — | — | — | — | — | — | — | — | | Paradise Again |
| "Moth to a Flame" (with the Weeknd) | 2021 | 5 | 8 | 19 | 17 | 14 | 13 | 14 | 10 | 15 | 27 | ARIA: Platinum; BPI: Platinum; BVMI: Gold; NVPI: Platinum; RIAA: Platinum | Paradise Again |
| "Redlight" (with Sting) | 2022 | — (Note: "Redlight" did not enter the Swedish Singellista Chart, but peaked at number one on the Swedish Heatseeker Chart.) | — | — | — | — | — | — | — | — | — | | Paradise Again |
| "Heaven Takes You Home" (featuring Connie Constance) | 2022 | 6 | — | — | — | — | 81 | 18 | — | 80 | — | NVPI: Gold | Paradise Again |
| "Turn On the Lights again.." (with Fred Again featuring Future) | 2022 | 60 | 71 | — | — | — | 23 | — | — | 27 | — | ARIA: Gold; BPI: Platinum | USB |
| "See the Light" (featuring Fridayy) | 2023 | — (Note: "See the Light" did not enter the Swedish Singellista Chart, but peaked at number 18 on the Swedish Heatseeker Chart.) | — | — | — | — | — | — | — | — | — | | TBA |
| "Ray of Solar" | 2023 | 54 | — | — | — | — | — | — | — | — | — | | TBA |
| "Lioness" (with Niki & the Dove) | 2024 | 87 | — | — | — | — | — | — | — | — | — | | TBA |
| "Finally" (with Alicia Keys) | 2024 | 75 | — | — | — | — | — | — | — | — | — | | TBA |
| "Wait So Long" | 2025 | 32 | — | — | 10 | — | — | — (Note: "Wait So Long" did not enter the Dutch Single Top 100, but peaked at number 10 on the Dutch Single Tip chart.) | — | — (Note: "Wait So Long" did not enter the UK Singles Chart, but peaked at number 72 on the UK Singles Downloads Chart and number 76 on the UK Singles Sales Chart.) | — | | TBA |
| "Happiness Is So Sad" (with Lykke Li) | 2026 | 3 | — | — | 44 | — | — | — | — | — | — | | TBA |
"—" denotes a recording that did not chart or was not released in that territory.

== Other charted songs ==
List of other charted songs, with selected chart positions, showing charting year and album name
| Title | Year | Peak chart positions | | Album |
| Title | Year | SWE Heat. | US Dance/ Elec. | Album |
|---|---|---|---|---|
| "Time" (featuring Mapei) | 2022 | 16 | 33 | Paradise Again |
| "Jacob's Note" (featuring Jacob Mühlrad) | 2022 | — | 47 | Paradise Again |
| "Mafia" | 2022 | — | 35 | Paradise Again |
| "Frankenstein" (with ASAP Rocky) | 2022 | 13 | 17 | Paradise Again |
| "Don't Go Mad" (featuring Seinabo Sey) | 2022 | 17 | 36 | Paradise Again |
| "Calling On" | 2022 | — | 42 | Paradise Again |

== Productions ==
| Title | Credited artist(s) | Year | Album |
|---|---|---|---|
| "Numb" | Usher | 2012 | Looking 4 Myself |
| "Euphoria" | Usher | 2012 | Looking 4 Myself |
| "How Do I Make You Love Me?" | The Weeknd | 2022 | Dawn FM |
| "Sacrifice" | The Weeknd | 2022 | Dawn FM |
| "Nothing Is Lost (You Give Me Strength)" | The Weeknd | 2022 | Avatar: The Way of Water soundtrack |
| "Underneath It All" | Mike Posner | 2025 | The Beginning |

== Remixes ==
| Title | Original artist(s) | Year | Album |
|---|---|---|---|
| "Leave the World Behind" (Dimitri Vegas & Like Mike vs. SHM Dark Forest Edit) | Axwell, Ingrosso, Angello and Laidback Luke featuring Deborah Cox | 2009 | Non-album remix |
| "Every Teardrop Is a Waterfall" (Coldplay vs. Swedish House Mafia) | Coldplay | 2012 | Until Now |
| "Euphoria" (Swedish House Mafia Extended Dub) | Usher | 2012 | Until Now |
| "Sacrifice" | The Weeknd | 2022 | Dawn FM |

== Music videos ==
List of music videos, showing year released and directors
| Title | Year | Director(s) |
|---|---|---|
| "One (Your Name)" (featuring Pharrell) | 2010 | Henrik Hanson, Christian Larson |
| "Miami 2 Ibiza" (with Tinie Tempah) | 2010 | Christian Larson |
| "Save the World" | 2011 | John Watts |
| "Antidote" (vs. Knife Party) | 2012 | BB Gun |
| "Greyhound" | 2012 | Carl Erik Rinsch |
| "Don't You Worry Child" (featuring John Martin) | 2012 | Christian Larson |
| "It Gets Better" | 2021 | Alexander Wessely |
| "Lifetime" (with Ty Dolla Sign and 070 Shake) | 2021 | Alexander Wessely |
| "Moth to a Flame" (with the Weeknd) | 2021 | Alexander Wessely |
| "Redlight" (with Sting) | 2022 | Alexander Wessely |

== See also ==
- Steve Angello discography
- Axwell discography
- Sebastian Ingrosso discography
