= Sebastian Ingrosso discography =

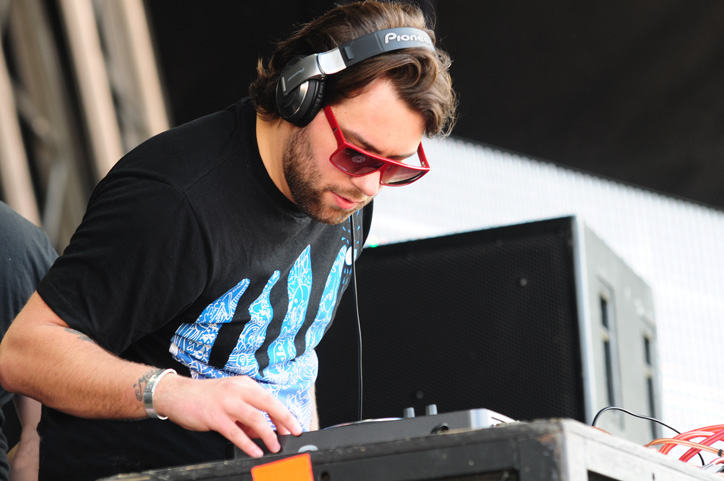
Ingrosso in 2009

The discography of Swedish DJ Sebastian Ingrosso consists of three EPs and twenty-one singles. Three of his EPs were released in 2004 with his debut Mode Machine being released on 1 January, his second Stockholm Disco on 16 April and his third Hook da Mode on 2 June. His first single to chart in a country was "Get Dumb", a collaboration fellow Swedish House Mafia members Axwell and Steve Angello, and frequent collaborator Laidback Luke. The song, included in Swedish House Mafia's debut studio album Until One, charted in the Netherlands at number 45. Ingrosso's debut single was released in 2004, titled "Yo Yo Kidz", with Angello.

== Extended plays ==
Title	Album details
Mode Machine	Released: 1 January 2004
Stockholm Disco (with John Dahlbäck)	Released: 16 April 2004
Hook da Mode	Released: 2 June 2004

== Singles ==
List of singles as lead artist, with selected chart positions, showing year released and album name
Title	Year	Peak chart positions									Certifications	Album
Title	Year	SWE	AUS	BEL	ESP	FRA	GER	IRE	NLD	UK	Certifications	Album
"Yo Yo Kidz" (with Steve Angello)	2004	—	—	—	—	—	—	—	—	—		Non-album single
"Together" (with Axwell)	2005	—	—	—	—	—	—	—	—	—		X4
"Click" (with Steve Angello)	2006	—	—	—	—	—	—	—	—	—		Non-album single
"Get Dumb" (with Axwell, Angello and Laidback Luke)	2007	—	—	—	—	—	—	—	45	—		Until One
"Umbrella" (with Steve Angello)	2007	—	—	—	15	—	—	—	67	—		Non-album singles
"It's True" (with Axwell vs. Salem Al Fakir)	2007	38	—	—	—	—	—	—	64	—		This Is Who I Am
"555" (with Steve Angello)	2007	—	—	—	—	—	—	—	—	—		Non-album singles
"It" (with Steve Angello and Laidback Luke)	2008	—	—	—	—	—	—	—	—	—		Non-album singles
"Partouze" (with Steve Angello)	2008	—	—	—	—	—	—	—	—	—		Non-album singles
"Chaa Chaa" (with Laidback Luke)	2008	—	—	—	—	—	—	—	—	—		Non-album singles
"Everytime We Touch" (with David Guetta, Chris Willis and Steve Angello)	2009	—	—	53	—	—	—	—	46	68		Pop Life
"Leave the World Behind" (with Axwell, Angello and Laidback Luke featuring Deborah Cox)	2009	39	—	64	—	—	—	—	75	—		Until One and Until Now
"Kidsos"	2009	—	—	—	—	—	—	—	98	—		Until One
"Meich" (with Dirty South)	2011	—	—	—	—	—	—	—	—	—		Until One
"Calling (Lose My Mind)" (with Alesso featuring Ryan Tedder)	2012	18	—	82	—	136	—	47	58	19	GLF: 3× Platinum; ARIA: Gold; FIMI: Gold	Until Now
"Reload" (with Tommy Trash)	2012	—	—	48	—	—	—	—	—	—		Until Now
"Reload" (with Tommy Trash featuring John Martin)	2013	5	20	—	—	152	89	13	66	3	GLF: 2× Platinum; BPI: Silver	Non-album single
"Roar" (with Axwell)	2013	—	—	114	—	—	—	—	—	—		Monsters University
"FLAGS!" (with LIOHN & Salvatore)	2016	—	—	—	—	—	—	—	—	—		Non-album single
"Dark River"	2016	84	—	—	—	—	—	—	—	—		More Than You Know
"Ride It" (with Salvatore Ganacci featuring Bunji Garlin)	2017	—	—	—	—	—	—	—	—	—		Non-album singles
"A New Day" (with Celine Dion)	2025	71	—	—	—	—	—	—	—	— (Note: "A New Day" did not enter the UK Singles Chart Top 100, but debuted at number 21 on the UK Singles Downloads Chart.)		Non-album singles
"—" denotes a recording that did not chart or was not released in that territory.

== Other charted songs ==
List of songs, with selected chart positions, showing year released and album name
Title	Year	Peak chart positions	Album
Title	Year	SWE	Album
"How Soon Is Now" (with David Guetta and Dirty South featuring Julie McKnight)	2009	52	One Love
"—" denotes a recording that did not chart or was not released in that territory.

== Remixes ==
List of remixes, showing original artists and year released
Title	Original artist(s)	Year	Album
"Wants Vs. Needs" (Ingrosso Remix)	Sheridan	2002	Non-album remixes
"Keep This Fire Burning" (Ingrosso & Fader Remix)	Robyn	2002	Non-album remixes
"Your Love" (Angello & Ingrosso Remix)	Arcade Mode	2003	Non-album remixes
"Don't Stop" (Ingrosso Remix)	Dukes of Sluca	2004	Non-album remixes
"Acid / Euro" (Ingrosso Remix)	Steve Angello	2004	Non-album remixes
"Call On Me" (Angello & Ingrosso Remix)	Eric Prydz	2004	Non-album remixes
"Put 'Em High" (Steve Angello & Sebastian Ingrosso Remix)	StoneBridge	2004	Non-album remixes
"EQ-Lizer" (Angello & Ingrosso Remix)	In-N-Out	2005	Non-album remixes
"That Sound" (Angello & Ingrosso Remix)	Steve Lawler	2005	Non-album remixes
"One Eye Shut" (Steve Angello & Sebastian Ingrosso Remix)	Robbie Rivera and StoneBridge	2005	Non-album remixes
"Famous & Rich" (Angello & Ingrosso Remix)	Naughty Queen	2005	Non-album remixes
"Some Kinda Freak" (Sebastian Ingrosso Remix)	Full Blown	2005	Non-album remixes
"Industry" (Sebastian Ingrosso Remix)	The Modern	2005	Non-album remixes
"Rock The Choice" (Sebastian Ingrosso Remix)	Joachim Garraud	2005	Non-album remixes
"Dream About Me" (Sebastian Ingrosso Remix)	Moby	2005	Non-album remixes
"Peace" (Sebastian Ingrosso Remix)	Tony Senghore	2005	Non-album remixes
"Dark Side of the Moon" (Axwell & Sebastian Ingrosso Remix)	Ernesto vs. Bastian	2005	Non-album remixes
"Say Hello" (Angello & Ingrosso Remix)	Deep Dish	2005	Non-album remixes
"49 Percent" (Angello & Ingrosso Remix)	Röyksopp	2005	Non-album remixes
"Housetrack" (Ingrosso Remix)	Alex Neri	2005	Non-album remixes
"Love For You" (Angello & Ingrosso Remix)	DJ Flex and Sandy W	2005	Non-album remixes
"Me & U" (Steve Angello & Sebastian Ingrosso Edit)	Ultra DJ's	2006	Non-album remixes
"My Love" (Angello & Ingrosso Remix)	Justin Timberlake	2006	Non-album remixes
"Proper Education" (Sebastian Ingrosso Remix)	Eric Prydz vs. Floyd	2006	Non-album remixes
"Swimming Places" (Sebastian Ingrosso Re-Edit)	Julien Jabre	2006	Non-album remixes
"Suburban Knights" (Angello & Ingrosso Remix)	Hard-Fi	2007	Non-album remixes
"Jack U" (Angello & Ingrosso Remix)	Felix Da Housecat featuring P. Diddy	2008	Non-album remixes
"Bumpy Ride" (Sebastian Ingrosso Remix)	Mohombi	2010	Non-album remixes
"Silvia" (Sebastian Ingrosso & Dirty South Remix)	Miike Snow	2010	Until One
"Beautiful People" (Sebastian Ingrosso Edit)	Chris Brown featuring Benny Benassi	2011	Non-album remixes
"Dive" (Sebastian Ingrosso & Salvatore Remix)	Salvatore featuring Enya & Alex Aris	2016	Non-album remixes
"How Do I Make You Love Me?" (Sebastian Ingrosso & Salvatore Ganacci Remix)	The Weeknd	2022	Dawn FM(Alternate World)

== Releases under an alias ==
=== As Buy Now! (with Steve Angello) ===
Title	Year	Album
"For Sale"	2005	Non-album singles
"Body Crash"	2005	Non-album singles
"Let You Do This" (with Salvatore Ganacci)	2022	Non-album singles

=== As Fireflies (with Steve Angello) ===
Title	Year	Album
"I Can't Get Enough" (featuring Alexandra Prince)	2006	Non-album single

=== As General Moders (with Steve Angello) ===
Title	Year	Album
"Cross the Sky"	2004	Non-album single

=== As Mode Hookers (with Steve Angello) ===
Title	Year	Album
"Swing Me Daddy"	2004	Non-album single

=== As Outfunk (with Steve Angello) ===
Title	Year	Album
"Bumper"	2001	Non-album singles
"All I Can Take"	2001	Non-album singles
"I Am the One"	2001	Non-album singles
"Echo Vibes"	2002	Non-album singles
"Lost in Music"	2003	Non-album singles

=== As The Sinners (with Steve Angello) ===
Title	Year	Album
"One Feeling"	2003	Non-album singles
"Keep on Pressing"	2003	Non-album singles
"Sad Girls"	2003	Non-album singles
"Under Pressure"	2003	Non-album singles

== See also ==
- Swedish House Mafia discography
- Axwell & Ingrosso discography
- Axwell discography
- Steve Angello discography
