= Steve Angello discography =

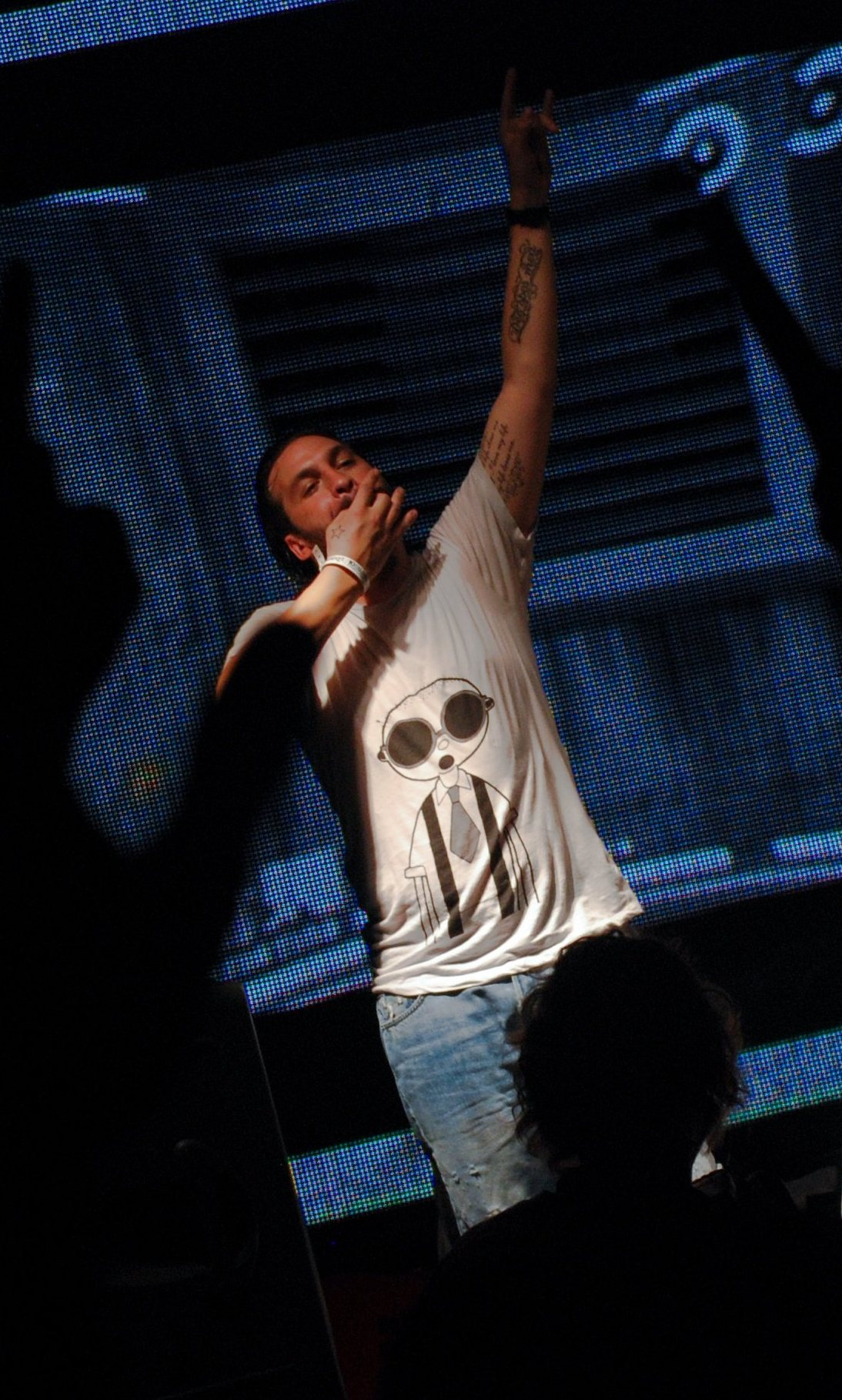
Steve Angello & Sebastian Ingrosso @ Remix Hotel

This is the discography for the Greek-Swedish electronic musician Steve Angello.

== Albums ==
=== Studio albums ===
| Title | Album details | Peak chart positions | | | | |
| Title | Album details | SWE | BEL | ITA | SPA | US Dance |
|---|---|---|---|---|---|---|
| Wild Youth | Released: 22 January 2016; Label: Size; Format: Digital download | 20 | 90 | 94 | 96 | 4 |
| Human | Released: 27 April 2018; Label: Size; Format: Digital download | — | 167 | — | — | — |

=== Compilation albums ===
| Title | Album details |
|---|---|
| Steve Angello Presents Tracks | Released: 13 January 2003; Label: Konvex | Konkav; Format: CD, digital download |
| Tribal Mix, Vol. 2 | Released: 2004; Format: CD, digital download |
| Ibiza 4AM (with Sebastian Ingrosso) | Released: 2005; Format: CD, digital download |
| Stadium Electro | Released: 2007; Format: CD, digital download |
| Size: First Dimension | Released: 2009; Format: Digital download |
| The Yearbook | Released: 2009; Label: Size Records; Format: CD, digital download |
| Size Matters (with AN21) | Released: 2010; Format: CD, digital download |
| #DECADE | Released: 2014; Label: Size Records; Format: CD, digital download |

== Extended plays ==
| Title | EP details |
|---|---|
| Simplicity | Released: 6 April 2003; Format: CD, vinyl, digital download |
| Twisted Sense | Released: 8 July 2003; Format: CD, Vinyl, digital download |
| Strange Fruit | Released: 9 July 2003; Format: CD, vinyl, digital download |
| Tool Box | Released: 21 May 2004; Format: CD, vinyl, digital download |
| EP | Released: 28 June 2004; Format: Digital download |
| Summer Sampler | Released: 8 July 2009; Format: CD, vinyl, digital download |
| Genesis | Released: 4 August 2017; Format: Digital download |
| Inferno | Released: 13 October 2017; Format: Digital download |
| Paradiso | Released: 16 November 2017; Format: Digital download |

== Singles ==
=== As lead artist ===
List of singles as lead artist, with selected chart positions and certifications, showing year released and album name
| Title | Year | Peak chart positions | | | | | | | | | Certifications | Album |
| Title | Year | SWE | AUS | BEL | ESP | FRA | GER | IRE | NLD | UK | Certifications | Album |
|---|---|---|---|---|---|---|---|---|---|---|---|---|
| "Voices" | 2003 | — | — | — | — | — | — | — | — | — | | Non-album singles |
| "Yo Yo Kidz" (with Sebastian Ingrosso) | 2004 | — | — | — | — | — | — | — | — | — | | Non-album singles |
| "Euro" | 2004 | — | — | — | — | — | — | — | — | — | | Non-album singles |
| "Only Man" / "Pump It" | 2004 | — | — | — | — | — | — | — | — | — | | Non-album singles |
| "Woz Not Woz" (with Eric Prydz) | 2005 | — | — | — | — | 50 | 63 | — | — | 55 | | Non-album singles |
| "Teasing Mr. Charlie" | 2006 | — | — | — | — | — | — | — | — | — | | Non-album singles |
| "Click" (with Sebastian Ingrosso) | 2006 | — | — | — | — | — | — | — | — | — | | Non-album singles |
| "Otherwize Then" (with Laidback Luke) | 2006 | — | — | — | — | — | — | — | — | — | | Non-album singles |
| "Get Dumb" (with Axwell, Ingrosso and Laidback Luke) | 2007 | — | — | — | — | — | — | — | 45 | — | | Until One |
| "Umbrella" (with Sebastian Ingrosso) | 2007 | — | — | — | 15 | — | — | — | 67 | — | | Non-album singles |
| "Trix" | 2007 | — | — | — | — | — | — | — | — | — | | Non-album singles |
| "Baby When the Light" (with David Guetta featuring Cozi) | 2007 | 35 | 62 | 5 | — | 6 | 59 | — | — | 50 | SNEP: Gold | Pop Life |
| "Be" (with Laidback Luke) | 2007 | — | — | — | — | — | — | — | — | — | | Non-album singles |
| "555" (with Sebastian Ingrosso) | 2007 | — | — | — | — | — | — | — | — | — | | Non-album singles |
| "It" (with Sebastian Ingrosso and Laidback Luke) | 2008 | — | — | — | — | — | — | — | — | — | | Non-album singles |
| "Gypsy" | 2008 | — | — | — | — | — | — | — | — | — | | Non-album singles |
| "Partouze" (with Sebastian Ingrosso) | 2008 | — | — | — | — | — | — | — | — | — | | Non-album singles |
| "Show Me Love" (with Laidback Luke featuring Robin S.) | 2008 | — | 73 | — | — | 25 | 93 | 25 | — | 11 | BPI: Platinum | Until One and The Yearbook |
| "Tivoli" | 2009 | — | — | — | — | — | — | — | — | — | | Until One and The Yearbook |
| "Everytime We Touch" (with David Guetta, Chris Willis and Sebastian Ingrosso) | 2009 | — | — | 53 | — | — | — | — | 46 | 68 | | Pop Life |
| "Leave the World Behind" (with Axwell, Ingrosso and Laidback Luke featuring Deborah Cox) | 2009 | 39 | — | 64 | — | — | — | — | 75 | — | | Until One, Until Now and The Yearbook |
| "Valodja" (with AN21) | 2009 | — | — | — | — | — | — | — | — | — | | Until One and The Yearbook |
| "Isabel" | 2009 | — | — | — | — | — | — | — | — | — | | The Yearbook |
| "Flonko" (with AN21) | 2009 | — | — | — | — | — | — | — | — | — | | The Yearbook |
| "Monday" | 2009 | — | — | — | — | — | — | — | — | — | | The Yearbook |
| "Alpha Baguera" | 2009 | — | — | — | — | — | — | — | — | — | | The Yearbook |
| "Rave 'N' Roll" | 2010 | — | — | — | — | — | — | — | — | — | | Non-album single |
| "KNAS" | 2010 | — | — | 60 | — | — | — | — | 70 | — | | Until One |
| "Open Your Eyes" (with Alex Metric featuring Ian Brown) | 2011 | — | — | — | — | — | — | — | — | — | | Non-album singles |
| "H8RS" (vs. AN21 and Max Vangeli) | 2012 | — | — | — | — | — | — | — | — | — | | Non-album singles |
| "Lights" (with Third Party) | 2012 | — | — | — | — | — | — | — | — | — | | Until Now |
| "Yeah" | 2013 | — | — | — | — | — | — | — | — | — | | Non-album singles |
| "SLVR" (with Matisse & Sadko) | 2013 | — | — | — | — | — | — | — | — | — | | Non-album singles |
| "Payback" (with Dimitri Vangelis & Wyman) | 2014 | — | — | 48 | — | — | — | — | — | — | GLF: Gold | Non-album singles |
| "Wasted Love" (featuring Dougy) | 2014 | 58 | — | — | — | — | — | — | — | — | | Wild Youth |
| "Children of the Wild" (featuring Mako) | 2015 | — | — | — | — | — | — | — | — | — | | Wild Youth |
| "Remember" (featuring The Presets) | 2015 | — | — | 25 | — | — | — | — | — | — | | Wild Youth |
| "Tiger" | 2015 | — | — | — | — | — | — | — | — | — | | Wild Youth |
| "The Ocean" (with Saturday, Monday featuring Julia Spada) | 2015 | — | — | — | — | — | — | — | — | — | | Wild Youth |
| "Prisoner" (featuring Gary Go) | 2015 | — | — | — | — | — | — | — | — | — | | Wild Youth |
| "Follow Me" (with Still Young) | 2016 | — | — | — | — | — | — | — | — | — | | Non-album single |
| "Breaking Kind" (featuring Paul Meany) | 2017 | — | — | — | — | — | — | — | — | — | | Human |
| "Rejoice" (featuring T.D.Jakes) | 2017 | — | — | — | — | — | — | — | — | — | | Human |
| "Freedom" (featuring Pusha T) | 2017 | — | — | — | — | — | — | — | — | — | | Human |
| "I Know" | 2017 | — | — | — | — | — | — | — | — | — | | Human |
| "Break Me Down" | 2017 | — | — | — | — | — | — | — | — | — | | Human |
| "Dopamine" (with Barns Courtney) | 2017 | — | — | — | — | — | — | — | — | — | | Human |
| "Nothing Scares Me Anymore" (featuring Sam Martin) | 2018 | — (Note: "Nothing Scares Me Anymore" did not enter the Swedish Singellista Chart, but peaked at number eight on the Swedish Heatseeker Chart.) | — | — | — | — | — | — | — | — | | Human |
"—" denotes a recording that did not chart or was not released in that territory.

=== As featuring artist ===
List of singles as featured artist, showing year released and album name
| Title | Year | Album |
|---|---|---|
| "Romani" (Kryder featuring Steve Angello) | 2018 | Non-album single |

== Other releases ==
- 2015: With Eric Prydz – "Bedtime Stories" (unreleased)
- 2015: "Feel at Home"
- 2015: Dimitri Vegas & Like Mike vs. Steve Angello – "Sentido" (unreleased)
- 2014: vs. Wayne & Woods – "I/O"
- 2014: With AN21 & Sebjak – "GODS"
- 2012: Sebastian Ingrosso, Steve Angello and Alesso – "Eclipse (Why Am I Doing This)" (unreleased)
- 2011: With A-Trak – "Higher" (unreleased)
- 2005: With Sebastian Ingrosso – "82-83"
- 2005: vs. Fuzzy Hair – "In Beat"
- 2005: With Audio Bullys – "Get Get Down"
- 2005: With Sebastian Ingrosso – "Yeah"
- 2005: "Acid"
- 2004: "The Look (I Feel Sexy)"
- 2004: With Dave Armstrong – "Groove in You"
- 2004: "Sansation"

== Releases under an alias ==
=== As A&P Project (with Eric Prydz) ===
| Title | Year | Album |
|---|---|---|
| "Sunrise" | 2003 | Non-album single |

=== As Buy Now! (with Sebastian Ingrosso) ===
| Title | Year | Album |
|---|---|---|
| "For Sale" | 2005 | Non-album singles |
| "Body Crash" | 2005 | Non-album singles |
| "Let You Do This" (with Salvatore Ganacci) | 2022 | Non-album singles |

=== As Fireflies (with Sebastian Ingrosso) ===
| Title | Year | Album |
|---|---|---|
| "I Can't Get Enough" (featuring Alexandra Prince) | 2006 | Non-album single |

=== As General Moders (with Sebastian Ingrosso) ===
| Title | Year | Album |
|---|---|---|
| "Cross the Sky" | 2004 | Non-album single |

=== As Mode Hookers (with Sebastian Ingrosso) ===
| Title | Year | Album |
|---|---|---|
| "Swing Me Daddy" | 2004 | Non-album single |

=== As Mescal Kid ===
| Title | Year | Album |
|---|---|---|
| "Magic" | 2008 | Non-album singles |
| "Do You Want It?" | 2009 | Non-album singles |

=== As Outfunk (with Sebastian Ingrosso) ===
| Title | Year | Album |
|---|---|---|
| "Bumper" | 2001 | Non-album singles |
| "All I Can Take" | 2001 | Non-album singles |
| "I Am the One" | 2001 | Non-album singles |
| "Echo Vibes" | 2002 | Non-album singles |
| "Lost in Music" | 2003 | Non-album singles |

=== As Supermode (with Axwell) ===
| Title | Year | Peak chart positions | | | | | | | | | Certifications | Album |
| Title | Year | SWE | AUS | BEL | ESP | FRA | GER | IRE | NLD | UK | Certifications | Album |
|---|---|---|---|---|---|---|---|---|---|---|---|---|
| "Tell Me Why" | 2006 | — | 48 | 22 | 19 | 22 | 65 | 31 | 11 | 13 | BPI: Gold; BVMI: Gold; PROMUSICAE: Gold | Until One |

=== As The Sinners (with Sebastian Ingrosso) ===
| Title | Year | Album |
|---|---|---|
| "One Feeling" | 2003 | Non-album singles |
| "Keep on Pressing" | 2003 | Non-album singles |
| "Sad Girls" | 2003 | Non-album singles |
| "Under Pressure" | 2003 | Non-album singles |

=== As Who's Who? ===
| Title | Year | Album |
|---|---|---|
| "Not So Dirty" | 2005 | Non-album singles |
| "Copycat" | 2005 | Non-album singles |
| "Lipstick" | 2005 | Non-album singles |
| "Sexy Fuck" | 2006 | Non-album singles |
| "Body Crash" | 2008 | Non-album singles |
| "Sweden" | 2008 | Non-album singles |
| "Klack" | 2008 | Non-album singles |

== Productions ==
| Title | Credited artist(s) | Year | Album |
|---|---|---|---|
| "Right Hand Hi" | Kid Sister | 2009 | Ultraviolet |
| "Don't Hold Your Breath" | Nicole Scherzinger | 2011 | Killer Love |
| "Troublemaker" | Taio Cruz | 2011 | TY.O |
| "Shotcaller" | Taio Cruz | 2011 | TY.O |
| "Positive" | Taio Cruz | 2011 | TY.O |
| "Power & Control" | Marina and the Diamonds | 2012 | Electra Heart |
| "This Is Love" | will.i.am featuring Eva Simons | 2012 | #willpower |
| "Numb" | Usher | 2012 | Looking 4 Myself |
| "Euphoria"^{1} | Usher | 2012 | Looking 4 Myself |

Notes

- Note 1:

Produced with Axwell and Sebastian Ingrosso under the name Swedish House Mafia.

== Remixes ==
- 2003 – Aerosol featuring Anne Murillo – Let the Music Play
- 2003 – StoneBridge – Put 'Em High (Steve Angello & Sebastian Ingrosso Remix)
- 2003 – Arcade Mode – Your Love (Angello & Ingrosso Remix)
- 2003 – Gadjo – So Many Times
- 2004 – Deepgroove – Electrik / Diva (In My House)
- 2004 – Magnolia – It's All Vain (Steve Angello Remix)
- 2004 – DJ Flex and Sandy W – Love For You (Angello & Ingrosso Remix)
- 2004 – DJ Luccio – No Fear
- 2004 – DJ Rooster and Sammy Peralta – Shake It
- 2004 – Touché – She's at the Club / The Body Clap
- 2004 – Mohito – Slip Away
- 2004 – Room 5 – U Got Me
- 2004 – Eurythmics – Sweet Dreams (Steve Angello Remix)
- 2004 – Phase 2 – Voodoo Love
- 2004 – Eric Prydz – Call on Me (Angello & Ingrosso Remix)
- 2004 – Benjamin Bates – Whole (The Steve Angello Mixes)
- 2005 – Armand Van Helden featuring Tekitha presents Sahara – Everytime I Feel It
- 2005 – Full Blown – Some Kinda Freak (Who's Who Re-edit)
- 2005 – DJ Rooster and Sammy Peralta – Shake It (Steve Angello Mix)
- 2005 – Röyksopp – 49 Percent (Angello & Ingrosso Remix)
- 2005 – Deep Dish – Say Hello (Angello & Ingrosso Remix)
- 2005 – Roman Flügel – Geht's Noch ?
- 2005 – Sahara – Everytime I Feel It (Steve Angello Remix)
- 2005 – Moby – Raining Again
- 2005 – Naughty Queen – Famous & Rich (Angello & Ingrosso Remix)
- 2005 – Robbie Rivera and StoneBridge – One Eye Shut (Steve Angello & Sebastian Ingrosso Remix)
- 2005 – Steve Lawler – That Sound (Angello & Ingrosso Remix)
- 2005 – MBG and SDS – New Jack
- 2005 – Alex Neri – Housetrack
- 2005 – In-N-Out – EQ-Lizer (Angello & Ingrosso Remix)
- 2006 – Innersphere aka Shinedoe – Phunk (Steve Angello Re-Edit)
- 2006 – Justin Timberlake – My Love (Angello & Ingrosso Remix)
- 2006 – Ultra DJ's – Me & U (Steve Angello & Sebastian Ingrosso Edit)
- 2006 – Laidback Luke featuring Stephen Granville – Hypnotize (Steve Angello Remix)
- 2007 – Robyn and Kleerup – With Every Heartbeat (Steve Angello Dub)
- 2007 – Ray Parker Jr. – Ghostbusters Theme (Steve Angello Remix)
- 2007 – Fergie – London Bridge
- 2007 – Hard-Fi – Suburban Knights (Angello & Ingrosso Remix)
- 2007 – Robbie Rivera – One Eye Shut (Angello & Ingrosso Remix)
- 2008 – Tocadisco – Da Fuckin' Noize (Steve Angello Remix)
- 2008 – Flash Brothers – Palmito (Steve Angello RMX)
- 2009 – Kim Fai – P.O.V
- 2009 – Christian Smith and John Selway – Move!
- 2010 – Harry Romero, Junior Sanchez and Alexander Technique featuring Shawnee Taylor – Where You Are (Steve Angello Edit)
- 2010 – Cheryl Cole featuring will.i.am – 3 Words (Steve Angello Remix)
- 2010 – Magnetic Man – Perfect Stranger (Steve Angello Remix)
- 2010 – Pendulum – The Island (Steve Angello, AN21 & Max Vangeli Remix)
- 2010 – Congorock – Babylon (Steve Angello Edit)
- 2011 – Tim Mason – The Moment (Steve Angello Edit)
- 2011 – Nari & Milani – Kendo (Steve Angello Edit)
- 2011 – Nero – Me & You (Steve Angello Remix)
- 2013 – Depeche Mode – Soothe My Soul (Steve Angello vs. Jacques Lu Cont Remix)
- 2013 – Chase and Status – Count On Me (Steve Angello Remix)
- 2014 – Coldplay – A Sky Full of Stars (S-A Ibiza Edit)
- 2014 – London Grammar – Hey Now (Arty Remix x S-A Ibiza Edit)
- 2015 – Jean Michel Jarre & M83 - Glory (Steve Angello Remix)
- 2015 – Susanne Sundfør - Kamikaze (Steve Angello & AN21 Remix)
- 2016 – Steve Angello & AN21 featuring Franz Novotny - Last Dance (Steve Angello Remix)

== See also ==
- Swedish House Mafia discography
- Axwell discography
- Sebastian Ingrosso discography
