= Wait So Long =

Wait So Long may refer to:

- "Wait So Long" (Trampled by Turtles song), 2010
- "Wait So Long" (Plan B song), 2018
- "Wait So Long" (Swedish House Mafia song), 2025
- "Waited So Long", Carly Simon song from No Secrets, 1972
