= I Found U =

Single by Axwell featuring Max'C

from the album Until One
- Released: 2007
- Length: 2:52 (radio edit)
- Label: EMI Records (Uk); Positiva Records (UK); Vendetta Records (Spain); Ultra Records (US)
- Songwriter(s): Axwell, Freddie McGregor, Charles Edward Salter, Earl Stanley Chinna

Axwell singles chronology
"Watch the Sunrise (feat. Steve Edwards)" (2005)	"I Found U" (2007)	"Get Dumb (with Steve Angello, Sebastian Ingrosso, and Laidback Luke)" (2007)

"I Found U" is a single by Swedish DJ Axwell featuring Max'C. The song was popular on the UK Singles Chart, reaching a peak of number 6 in August 2007. The "Remode" version became popular among fans and was widely used as the radio version. The song is still one of Axwell's most recognisable hits.

In 2010, it was included on the Swedish House Mafia mix album, Until One.

== Track listing ==
(Promo)

1. "I Found U" (Radio Edit) (2:52)
2. "I Found U" (Classic Edit) (3:34)
3. "I Found U" (Vocal Remode) (5:11)
4. "I Found U" (Remode) (6:56)
5. "I Found U" (Classic Mix) (6:32)
6. "I Found U" (Soul Avengerz Remix) (8:22)
7. "I Found U" (TV Rock Remix) (7:49)
8. "I Found U" (Instrumental) (6:54)

== Charts ==
Chart (2007)	Peak position
Belgium (Ultratop)	59
Hungary (Dance Top 40)	4
Hungary (Single Top 40)	3
Ireland (IRMA)	49
Netherlands (Dutch Top 40)	14
Netherlands (Single Top 100)	10
Romania (Romanian Top 100)	86
Spain (PROMUSICAE)	19
UK Singles (OCC)	6
UK Dance (OCC)	1

== Certifications ==
Region	Certification	Certified units/sales
United Kingdom (BPI)	Silver	200,000^{‡}
^{‡} Sales+streaming figures based on certification alone.
