= Afro Medusa =

British dance music trio

- Also known as: Afro Angel
- Genres: Classic House, Dance, Electronic
- Years active: 1999–2014
- Labels: Azuli Records, suSU, Beautiful Noise!, Decadent Records, AfroMedusa Music

Afro Medusa is a British dance music group that was initially formed by Isabel Fructuoso, Nick Bennett and Patrick Cole. They placed two songs on the US Hot Dance Music/Club Play chart, beginning with "Pasilda", which hit No. 1 in 2000. In 2002, they climbed to No. 26 with "Dreams" and, in 2008, they released "Oracle" with Cherie as vocalist.

"Pasilda" also reached number 31 in the UK Singles Chart in October 2000.

== History ==
Afro Medusa formed in the late 1990s when Isabel Fructuoso moved from Spain to London, where she met Patrick Cole and Nick Bennett, who were known as "Funkmasters". Fructuoso, who at the time was a Latin / funk / jazz musician, was introduced to electronic music through Cole and Bennett. In 1999, Afro Medusa first released "Pasilda", which quickly gained popularity on UK and US club scenes over the following year, especially after appearing at Miami's Winter Music Conference in March 2000. "Pasilda" hit #1 on the Billboard Hot Dance Music charts in November 2000. After the success of "Pasilda", Afro Medusa toured around the world, performing in various clubs and festivals. The group released their next successful track, "Dreams", in 2002, and it hit #26 on the Billboard charts.

The group then moved to suSU, a sublabel of Concept Music, and was renamed Afro Angel. On her personal website, Fructuoso wrote that she, Cole and Bennett spent a week together in a barn in Oxford to write the songs that they would potentially release under this new name. "Join Me Brother" was released in 2002 by suSU in the UK and by Tommy Boy Silver Label in the US. Another song titled "Magic" was signed by suSU, but it was not released until 2004.

In the meantime, Isabel Fructuoso was also writing and performing in other projects such as MAMBANA, together with the Swedish producer Axwell, which resulted in world hits "Libre", "No reason", and "Felicidad". Other collaborations with Stonebridge, such as "Clorophylla", "Asi asi" and "Nothing without me" and other producers like Bah Samba ("Calma") and Sulle ("No pares") took her to another level, performing all over the world.

In 2004 Isabel Fructuoso moved to Mozambique, where she continued to experiment with music and other arts, exploring different ways of expressing herself. Litembo and Vathuly Project were her two bands in Mozambique, writing and performing her record "Freedom Day", a departure from the house world into a fusion sound. in 2012 Isabel moved to Europe, now she is working with a group of women artist in the project Mainama.

Cole and Bennett continued the project by bringing on other vocalists. In 2007, Heidi Vogel was featured on "Pasilda Pt II: Come a Little Closer". In 2008, Cherrie Harris was featured on "Oracle" and "Tonight". Finally, in 2014, Emily Dell was featured on "Diving in Your Soul". No other music has been released by the group to date.

== Discography ==
=== Singles and EPs ===
- "Calling" (1999)
- "Pasilda" (1999)
- "Dreams" (2002)
- "Join Me Brother" (2002, Afro Angel)
- "Magic" (2004, Afro Angel)
- "Pasilda Pt II: Come a Little Closer" (2007)
- "Oracle" (2008)
- "Tonight" (2008)
- "Diving in Your Soul" (2014)
- "Pollera" (2025)

== See also ==
- List of Number 1 Dance Hits (United States)
- List of artists who reached number one on the US Dance chart
