= Soulfuric Recordings =

- Founded: 2000s
- Founder: Marc Pomeroy and Brian Tappert
- Country of origin: United States

Soulfuric Recordings is an independent house-music record label owned by Marc Pomeroy and Brian Tappert. It releases soulful house records worldwide and is the owner of music download site Traxsource.com.

In 2017 Soulfuric was sold to Defected Ltd.

== Artists ==
Artists signed to the label include Off the Cuff and Sandy Turnbull as well as Groove Addix

== See also ==
- List of house artists
- List of record labels
