= Axwell & Ingrosso discography =

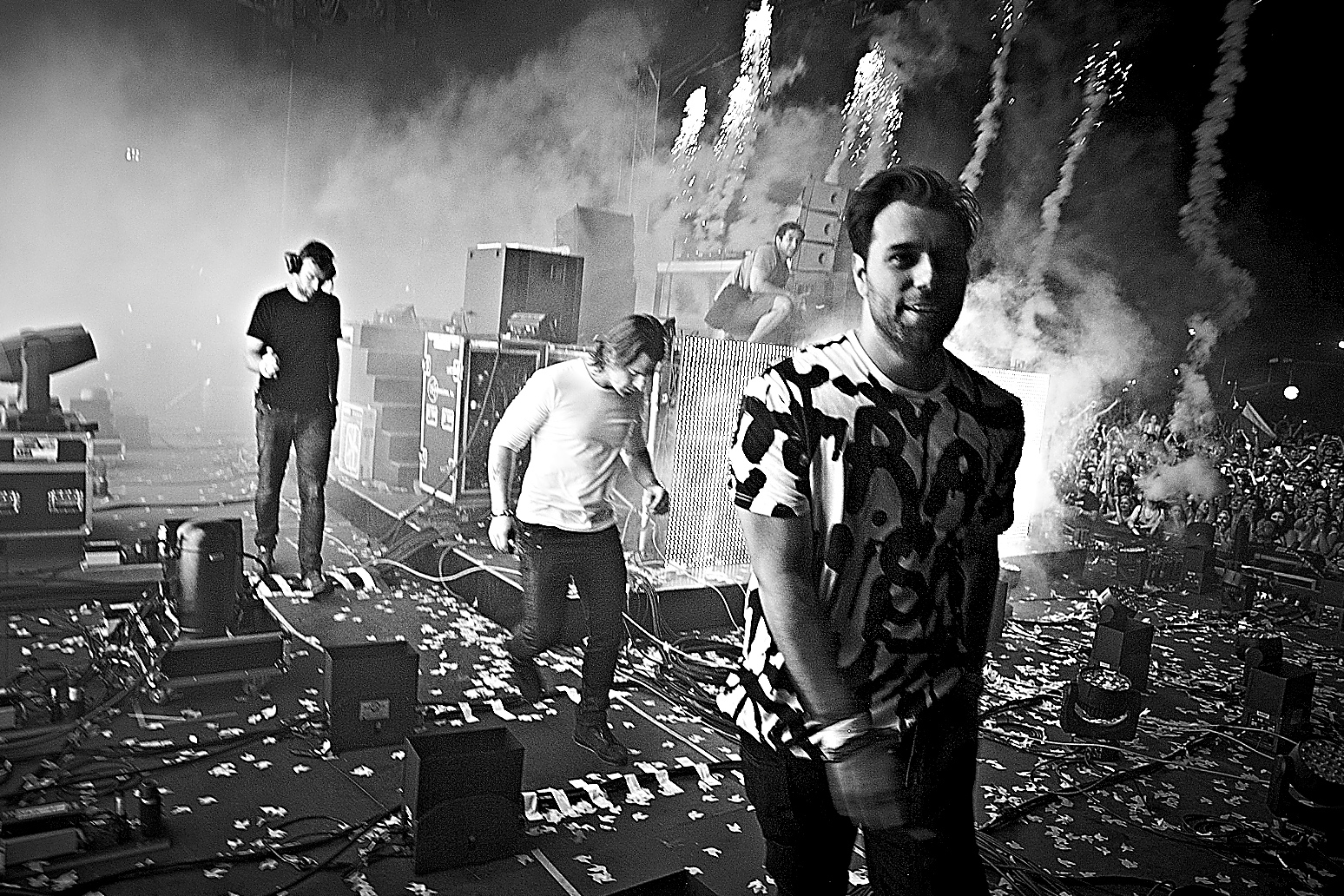
- Studio albums: 1
- EPs: 2
- Singles: 13
- Remixes: 1

The discography of the Swedish DJ duo Axwell & Ingrosso, consists of one studio album, two extended plays, thirteen singles and one remix.

== Studio albums ==
List of studio albums, with selected chart positions and album details
Title	Album details	Peak chart positions					
Title	Album details	SWE	BEL	DEN	FIN	NLD	NOR
More Than You Know	Released: 8 December 2017; Label: Axtone, Refune Music, Virgin; Formats: Digital download, CD, vinyl	12	111	36	19	90	16

== Extended plays ==
List of extended plays, showing title, date released, labels and download formats
Title	Details
X4	Released: 13 February 2014; Label: Axtone, Refune Music; Formats: Digital download
More Than You Know	Released: 24 May 2017; Label: Axtone, Refune Music, Def Jam; Formats: Digital download

== Singles ==
List of singles, with selected chart positions and certifications, showing year released and album name
Title	Year	Peak chart positions										Certifications	Album
Title	Year	SWE	AUT	BEL	DEN	GER	ITA	NLD	NOR	SWI	UK	Certifications	Album
"Something New"	2014	20	—	13	—	—	—	—	—	—	22	GLF: 2× Platinum; FIMI: Gold	X4
"On My Way"	2015	18	—	— (Note: "On My Way" did not enter the Ultratop 50, but peaked at number 78 on the Flemish Ultratip chart.)	—	—	—	82	—	—	100	GLF: 2× Platinum	Non-album single
"Can't Hold Us Down"	2015	—	—	—	—	—	—	—	—	—	—		X4
"Sun Is Shining"	2015	1	13	8	20	51	56	8	4	41	56	GLF: 5× Platinum; IFPI DEN: Gold; IFPI NOR: 2× Platinum; FIMI: Platinum; NVPI: Platinum	Non-album single
"This Time"	2015	73	—	26	—	—	—	—	—	—	—		Non-album single
"Dream Bigger"	2016	— (Note: "Dream Bigger" did not enter the Swedish Singles Chart, but peaked at number one on the Swedish Heatseekers chart.)	—	—	—	—	—	—	—	—	—		Non-album single
"Thinking About You"	2016	64	—	—	—	—	—	—	—	—	—		Non-album single
"I Love You" (featuring Kid Ink)	2017	10	—	— (Note: "I Love You" did not enter the Ultratop 50, but peaked at number 30 on the Flemish Ultratip chart.)	—	—	—	56	—	—	72	GLF: 3× Platinum	Non-album single
"Renegade" (Note: "Renegade" also appears on the EP More Than You Know)	2017	—	—	—	—	—	—	—	—	—	—		More Than You Know
"More Than You Know" (Note: "More Than You Know" also appears on the EP More Than You Know)	2017	2	1	4	26	1	4	14	4	2	30	GLF: 10× Platinum; BPI: Platinum; BEA: 2× Platinum; BVMI: 3× Platinum; FIMI: 4× Platinum; IFPI AUT: Platinum; IFPI DEN: Gold; IFPI NOR: 3× Platinum; RMNZ: Gold; RIAA: Gold	More Than You Know
"Dreamer"(featuring Trevor Guthrie)	2017	17	20	— (Note: "Dreamer" did not enter the Ultratop 50, but peaked at number two on the Flemish Ultratip chart.)	—	34	—	38	20	44	—	GLF: Platinum; BVMI: Gold; FIMI: Gold	More Than You Know
"Dancing Alone" (with Romans)	2018	29	—	— (Note: "Dancing Alone" did not enter the Ultratop 50, but peaked at number 41 on the Flemish Ultratip chart.)	—	—	—	—	—	—	—		Non-album single
"—" denotes a recording that did not chart or was not released in that territory.

== Promotional singles ==
Title	Year	Album
"We Come, We Rave, We Love"	2014	X4
"Dream Bigger" (Instrumental)	2015	Non-album single

== Remixes ==
List of remixes, showing original artists and year released
Title	Year	Original artist(s)	Album
"Thinking About You" (Festival Mix)	2016	Axwell Λ Ingrosso	Non-album remix
