= This Time (Axwell & Ingrosso song) =

Single by Axwell & Ingrosso
- Released: 6 November 2015
- Recorded: 2014
- Length: 3:37
- Label: Def Jam Recordings
- Songwriters: Terrence Thornton; Sebastian Ingrosso; Salem Al Fakir; Axel Hedfors; Vincent Pontare

Axwell & Ingrosso singles chronology
"Sun Is Shining" (2015)	"This Time" (2015)	"Dream Bigger" (2016)

"This Time" is a song by Swedish dance music duo Axwell & Ingrosso. The song was released in Sweden on 6 November 2015. The song was written by Terrence Thornton, Sebastian Ingrosso, Salem Al Fakir, Axel Hedfors and Vincent Pontare. The song features uncredited vocals from Pusha T. The song also samples the duo's debut track "Something New". The song peaked at number 73 on the Swedish Singles Chart.

== In other media ==
The song is featured on the video game, WWE 2K17.

== Track listing ==
Digital download
No.	Title	Length
1.	"This Time"	3:37

== Charts ==
=== Weekly charts ===
Chart (2015)	Peak position
Sweden (Sverigetopplistan)	73

== Release history ==
Region	Date	Format	Label
Sweden	6 November 2015	Digital download	Def Jam Recordings
