= Feel the Vibe =

2005 single by Axwell

Single by Axwell featuring Tara McDonald

from the album Superdeejays
- Released: 8 August 2005
- Recorded: 2004–2005
- Genre: Dance
- Length: 3:19
- Label: Data
- Songwriters: Axwell; Errol Reid; Tom Kent; Tara McDonald; Ben Cook; David Dollimore
- Producer: Axwell

Axwell singles chronology
"Feel the Vibe" (2005)	"Together" (2005)

Tara McDonald singles chronology
"Feel the Vibe (Til the Morning Comes)" (2005)

"Feel the Vibe", also released as "Feel the Vibe (Til the Morning Comes)" and "(Can You) Feel the Vibe", is a song by the Swedish dance producer Axwell, co written by and featuring the English/Irish singer-songwriter Tara McDonald. It was a breakthrough record for both Axwell and McDonald and was a number-one club record and a radio hit as well.

== Background and composition ==
"Feel the Vibe (Til the Morning Comes)" is an upbeat club-ready pop record. The lyrical theme explores letting go, releasing oneself and living in the moment; putting off what one does not want to think about until the morning.

"Feel the Vibe" was produced by Axwell in 2004, the instrumental version of the song already receiving major play in the clubs from summer 2004. Data Records contacted the hit songwriter McDonald to write and sing a top line for the UK release. She did this with her collaborator Tom Kent (who also recorded and produced the vocals) while McDonald handled the vocal arrangement.

"Feel the Vibe" was re-released by Ministry of Sound in 2005 as "Feel the Vibe (Til the Morning Comes)". It peaked at number one on the UK Dance Chart and at number 16 on the UK Singles Chart in August 2005. It also reached number 16 in Finland, number 62 in the Netherlands and number 4 on the club charts in France.

McDonald and Axwell met for the first time at the House Music Awards in London where she performed "Feel the Vibe (Til the Morning Comes)" with her backing dancers and singers.

== Track list ==
12" vinyl (Nero)

1. "Feel the Vibe" – 7:06

CD single (Data)

1. "Feel the Vibe (Til the Morning Comes)" (radio edit) – 3:19
2. "Feel the Vibe (Til the Morning Comes)" (vocal club mix) – 7:20
3. "Feel the Vibe (Til the Morning Comes)" (instrumental club mix) – 7:06
4. "Feel the Vibe (Til the Morning Comes)" (Kurtis Mantronik club mix) – 6:14
5. "Feel the Vibe (Til the Morning Comes)" (Seamus Haji big love remix) – 8:24
6. "Feel the Vibe (Til the Morning Comes)" (Mike Di Scala remix) – 7:04
7. "Feel the Vibe (Til the Morning Comes)" (video) – 7:06

Digital download (Axtone)

1. "(Can You) Feel the Vibe" [radio edit] – 2:55
2. "(Can You) Feel the Vibe" [extended vocal] – 6:04
3. "Feel the Vibe" – 7:06
4. "Feel the Vibe" (Seamus Haji big love remix) – 8:24
5. "Feel the Vibe" (Eric Prydz remix) – 8:15
6. "Feel the Vibe" (DJ Flex & Sandy "Vee" Wilhem remix) – 6:34
7. "Feel the Vibe" (Mike Di Scala remix) – 7:04
8. "Feel the Vibe (Til the Morning Comes)" [radio edit] – 3:19
9. "Feel the Vibe (Til the Morning Comes)" [vocal club mix] – 7:20
10. "Feel the Vibe (Til the Morning Comes)" [Kurtis Mantronik club mix] – 6:14

== Charts ==
Chart (2005)	Peak position
Australia (ARIA)	61
Belgium (Ultratip Bubbling Under Flanders)	3
Belgium (Ultratip Bubbling Under Wallonia)	8
Finland (Suomen virallinen lista)	16
Hungary (Dance Top 40)	26
Netherlands (Single Top 100)	62
UK Singles (Official Charts)	16
UK Dance (Official Charts)	1
