= Antidote (Swedish House Mafia song) =

Single by Swedish House Mafia vs. Knife Party

from the album Until Now
- Released: 16 December 2011
- Genre: Electro house
- Length: 6:14 (original mix); 2:57 (radio edit)
- Label: Virgin; EMI; Astralwerks
- Songwriters: Axwell; Steve Angello; Sebastian Ingrosso; Rob Swire; Gareth McGrillen; Adam Baptiste; Klas Åhlund
- Producers: Swedish House Mafia; Knife Party

Swedish House Mafia singles chronology
"Save the World" (2011)	"Antidote" (2011)	"Greyhound" (2012)

Knife Party singles chronology
"Antidote" (2011)	"Centipede" (2012)

Audio sample
- "Antidote": file; help

"Antidote" is a song by Swedish house music supergroup Swedish House Mafia in collaboration with Australian electronic music duo Knife Party. It was released on 16 December 2011 in the United States as the second single from the Swedish House Mafia compilation album, Until Now. The remix EP was released on 15 January 2012 for the UK digital download in the iTunes Store. "Antidote" was written by Swedish House Mafia members Axwell, Steve Angello and Sebastian Ingrosso, Knife Party members Rob Swire and Gareth McGrillen, along with Klas Åhlund and Adam Baptiste. The song contains uncredited vocals.

== Chart performance ==
In the United Kingdom, the song debuted at number four on the UK Singles Chart and number one on the UK Dance Chart with first-week sales of 46,757 copies. It is the Swedish House Mafia's fourth consecutive top 10 hit in the UK.

== Music video ==
The music video was released via YouTube on 19 December 2011 in association with Vevo in two different versions (clean and explicit). The story portrays a heist in a Japanese strip club. The explicit version contains more violent and sexual content.

== Track listings ==
Digital download
No.	Title	Length
1.	"Antidote" (radio edit)	2:57
2.	"Antidote" (original mix)	6:14
3.	"Antidote" (Knife Party Dub)	6:07
4.	"Antidote" (Swedish House Mafia Dub)	6:14
5.	"Antidote" (Tommy Trash Remix)	5:53

== Charts ==
=== Weekly charts ===
Chart (2011–2012)	Peak position
Austria (Ö3 Austria Top 40)	30
Belgium (Ultratop 50 Flanders)	35
Belgium (Ultratip Bubbling Under Wallonia)	9
Finland (Suomen virallinen lista)	13
France (SNEP)	93
Germany (GfK)	63
Ireland (IRMA)	39
Netherlands (Single Top 100)	49
Poland Dance (ZPAV)	38
Scottish Singles Sales (Official Charts)	3
Sweden (Sverigetopplistan)	17
Switzerland (Schweizer Hitparade)	70
UK Singles (Official Charts)	4
UK Dance (Official Charts)	2
US Dance Club Songs (Billboard)	3

=== Year-end charts ===
Chart (2012)	Position
Sweden (Sverigetopplistan)	54
UK Singles (OCC)	122

== Certifications ==
Region	Certification	Certified units/sales
Canada (Music Canada)	Gold	40,000^{‡}
Sweden (GLF)	3× Platinum	120,000^{‡}
United Kingdom (BPI)	Silver	200,000^{‡}
^{‡} Sales+streaming figures based on certification alone.

== Release history ==
Region	Date	Format	Label
United States	16 December 2011	Digital download	EMI Records
Ireland	13 January 2012	Digital download	EMI Records
United Kingdom	15 January 2012	Digital download	EMI Records
