= Save the World (Swedish House Mafia song) =

2011 single by Swedish House Mafia

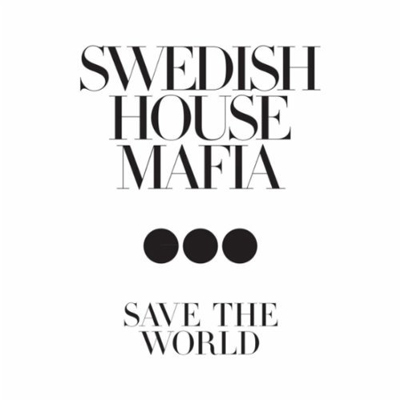

Single by Swedish House Mafia

from the album Until Now
- Released: 13 May 2011
- Genre: Progressive house
- Length: 3:34 (radio edit); 6:52 (extended mix)
- Label: Virgin; EMI
- Songwriters: Axel Hedfors; Steve Angello; Sebastian Ingrosso; John Martin; Michel Zitron; Vincent Pontare
- Producer: Swedish House Mafia

Swedish House Mafia singles chronology
"Miami 2 Ibiza" (2010)	"Save the World" (2011)	"Antidote" (2011)

John Martin singles chronology
"Save the World" (2011)	"Don't You Worry Child" (2012)

"Save the World" is a song by Swedish house music supergroup Swedish House Mafia. The song features uncredited vocals from Swedish singer John Martin, who co-wrote the song with Axwell, Steve Angello, Sebastian Ingrosso, Michel Zitron and Vincent Pontare. It was released on 13 May 2011 as a digital download, and it premiered on BBC Radio 1 on 22 April 2011 by Pete Tong. The song debuted in the UK singles chart at No. 11, and reached No. 10. Jon Watts directed the video, which features dogs as superheroes. The song peaked at number one on the Hot Dance Club Songs in the United States, becoming the group's second consecutive number-one single following "Miami 2 Ibiza" (2010). On 30 November 2011, the song received a nomination in 54th Grammy Awards for Best Dance Recording. The song has sold over 463,000 copies in the US. "Save the World" was well-received from music critics. The song is written in the key of C major.

== Track listing ==
- Digital download
1. "Save the World" (radio edit) – 3:34
2. "Save the World" (extended mix) – 6:52
- Digital download — remixes
1. "Save the World" (Knife Party remix) – 5:13
2. "Save the World" (Style of Eye & Carli remix) – 6:41
3. "Save the World" (Alesso remix) – 5:41
4. "Save the World" (Third Party remix) – 6:55
5. "Save the World" (Futurebound & Metrik remix) – 4:23
- Digital download — AN21 & Max Vangeli remix
1. "Save the World" (AN21 & Max Vangeli remix) – 6:42
- Digital download — Zedd remix
1. "Save the World" (Zedd remix) – 6:21
- Digital download — Cazzette remix
1. "Save the World" (Cazzette's Angry Swedish Hunter mix) – 6:22 – This remix, which was released through Swedish House Mafia's Facebook page, is no longer available for download.

== Charts ==
=== Weekly charts ===
Chart (2011)	Peak position
Austria (Ö3 Austria Top 40)	31
Belgium (Ultratop 50 Flanders)	5
Belgium (Ultratop 50 Wallonia)	34
Canada (Canadian Hot 100)	69
Czech Republic Airplay (ČNS IFPI)	15
Denmark (Tracklisten)	15
France (SNEP)	30
Germany (GfK)	37
Hungary (Rádiós Top 40)	3
Hungary (Dance Top 40)	10
Ireland (IRMA)	11
Luxembourg (Billboard)	7
Netherlands (Dutch Top 40)	6
Netherlands (Single Top 100)	20
New Zealand (Recorded Music NZ)	33
Norway (VG-lista)	14
Poland (Dance Top 50)	23
Romania (Romanian Top 100)	51
Scotland Singles (OCC)	6
Slovakia Airplay (ČNS IFPI)	13
Spain (Promusicae)	45
Sweden (Sverigetopplistan)	4
Switzerland (Schweizer Hitparade)	26
UK Dance (OCC)	5
UK Singles (OCC)	10
US Bubbling Under Hot 100 (Billboard)	5
US Dance Club Songs (Billboard)	1
US Dance/Mix Show Airplay (Billboard)	1
US Pop Airplay (Billboard)	35

=== Year-end charts ===
Chart (2011)	Position
Belgium (Ultratop Flanders)	39
Hungary (Dance Top 40)	26
Hungary (Rádiós Top 40)	21
Netherlands (Dutch Top 40)	24
Netherlands (Single Top 100)	77
Sweden (Sverigetopplistan)	36
UK Singles (Official Charts Company)	119
US Dance Club Songs (Billboard)	9
US Dance/Mix Show Airplay (Billboard)	5

Chart (2012)	Position
Hungary (Rádiós Top 40)	97
Sweden (Sverigetopplistan)	53

== Certifications ==
Region	Certification	Certified units/sales
Australia (ARIA)	Platinum	70,000^{^}
Belgium (BRMA)	Gold	15,000^{*}
Brazil (Pro-Música Brasil)	2× Platinum	120,000^{‡}
Canada (Music Canada)	Platinum	80,000^{‡}
Denmark (IFPI Danmark)	Gold	15,000^{^}
Italy (FIMI)	Gold	15,000^{*}
New Zealand (RMNZ)	Platinum	30,000^{‡}
Sweden (GLF)	5× Platinum	200,000^{‡}
United Kingdom (BPI)	Gold	400,000^{‡}
United States (RIAA)	Platinum	1,000,000^{‡}
Streaming
Denmark (IFPI Danmark)	Gold	50,000^{†}
^{*} Sales figures based on certification alone.^{^} Shipments figures based on certification alone.^{‡} Sales+streaming figures based on certification alone.^{†} Streaming-only figures based on certification alone.

== Release history ==
Country	Date	Format	Label
Australia	13 May 2011	Digital download	EMI
Ireland	13 May 2011	Digital download	EMI
Sweden	13 May 2011	Digital download	EMI
Germany	15 May 2011	Digital download	EMI
United Kingdom	15 May 2011	Digital download	EMI
United States	17 May 2011	Digital download	Astralwerks
United States	26 July 2011	Mainstream and Rhythmic airplay	Capitol

== See also ==
- List of number-one dance singles of 2011 (U.S.)
