= Greyhound (song) =

2012 single by Swedish House Mafia

Single by Swedish House Mafia

from the album Until Now
- Released: 12 March 2012
- Genre: EDM; progressive house; electro house
- Length: 3:34 (radio edit); 6:52 (extended mix)
- Label: Virgin; EMI
- Songwriters: Steve Angello; Axwell; Sebastian Ingrosso
- Producer: Swedish House Mafia

Swedish House Mafia singles chronology
"Antidote" (2011)	"Greyhound" (2012)	"Don't You Worry Child" (2012)

Music video
- "Greyhound" (Official) on YouTube

Audio sample
- "Greyhound": file; help

"Greyhound" is a single by the Swedish house music supergroup Swedish House Mafia. The track was released worldwide on 12 March 2012 as the third single from the album Until Now, released as a digital download on the iTunes Store. The song was created to promote Absolut Vodka's then-most recent brand of vodka, Absolut Greyhound. It was used in the first episode of season 2 of the Spanish thriller television series Elite.

== Music video ==
An official music video to accompany the release of "Greyhound" was first released onto YouTube on 13 March 2012 at a total length of 3:31. The video starts with a man in goggles sticking a pole into a salt desert. The members of Swedish House Mafia—Axwell, Sebastian Ingrosso, and Steve Angello—are then seen donning holographic headsets in an underground room. The headsets create colored bubbles around the members of Swedish House Mafia; Axwell in yellow, Ingrosso in blue, and Angello in red. As dog racers arrive on the track, the three men are connected to three robot greyhound dogs and prepare them for the race. A woman lays a hovering rabbit on the ground, which starts moving to commence the race as the dogs chase it. The video alternates between scenes of the race, shots of the supporters, and scenes of Axwell, Ingrosso and Angello controlling the dogs. Axwell temporarily disables Ingrosso's greyhound, but he quickly recovers and catches up. As the onlookers crowd together in anticipation, the three dogs reach the finishing line at the same time. A polaroid camera develops a photo of the finish, which is blown away into the desert. The video finishes with a shot of a bottle of Absolut Greyhound on a silver tray.

== Track listings ==
Digital download
No.	Title	Length
1.	"Greyhound" (Extended Mix)	6:52
2.	"Greyhound" (Radio Edit)	3:34

== Charts ==
=== Weekly charts ===
Chart (2012)	Peak position
Austria (Ö3 Austria Top 40)	42
Belgium (Ultratop 50 Flanders)	9
Belgium (Ultratop 50 Wallonia)	10
Denmark (Tracklisten)	21
Finland (Suomen virallinen lista)	16
France (SNEP)	39
Germany (GfK)	53
Netherlands (Dutch Top 40)	18
Netherlands (Single Top 100)	12
Ireland (IRMA)	25
Italy (FIMI)	25
Scotland Singles (OCC)	7
Sweden (Sverigetopplistan)	6
Switzerland (Schweizer Hitparade)	33
UK Dance (OCC)	5
UK Singles (OCC)	13
US Dance Club Songs (Billboard)	3
US Hot Dance/Electronic Songs (Billboard)	11

=== Year-end charts ===
Chart (2012)	Position
Belgium (Ultratop 50 Flanders)	65
France (SNEP)	185
Netherlands (Single Top 100)	96
Sweden (Sverigetopplistan)	11
UK Singles (OCC)	84

Chart (2013)	Position
Sweden (Sverigetopplistan)	49
US Hot Dance/Electronic Songs (Billboard)	60

== Certifications ==
Region	Certification	Certified units/sales
Australia (ARIA)	Gold	35,000^{^}
Brazil (Pro-Música Brasil)	Gold	30,000^{‡}
Canada (Music Canada)	Platinum	80,000^{‡}
Sweden (GLF)	7× Platinum	280,000^{‡}
United Kingdom (BPI)	Gold	400,000^{‡}
United States (RIAA)	Gold	500,000^{‡}
Streaming
Denmark (IFPI Danmark)	Gold	900,000^{†}
^{^} Shipments figures based on certification alone.^{‡} Sales+streaming figures based on certification alone.^{†} Streaming-only figures based on certification alone.

== Release history ==
Region	Date	Format	Label
United States	12 March 2012	Digital download	EMI Records
Ireland	12 March 2012	Digital download	EMI Records
United Kingdom	12 March 2012	Digital download	EMI Records
