= Center of the Universe (song) =

2013 Axwell song

Single by Axwell
- Released: 27 May 2013
- Genre: Progressive house
- Length: 3:37
- Label: Axtone
- Songwriter(s): Axwell, Magnus Carlson
- Producer(s): Axwell

"Center of the Universe" is a song by Swedish DJ and house music producer Axwell. It features vocals from Magnus Carlson, who co-wrote the song along with Axwell.

== Charts ==
Chart (2013)	Peak position
Belgium (Ultratip Bubbling Under Flanders)	13
Belgium (Ultratip Bubbling Under Wallonia)	11
France (SNEP)	194
Hungary (Rádiós Top 40)	17
Slovakia (Rádio Top 100)	34
Sweden (Sverigetopplistan)	39
UK Singles (OCC)	113
US Billboard Dance/Mix Show Airplay	18
