= Belong (Axwell and Shapov song) =

Single by Axwell and Shapov
- Released: 5 August 2016
- Length: 3:24
- Label: Axtone; Ultra Records
- Songwriters: Lars Aar; Axwell; Sebastian Ingrosso; Alx Reuterskiöld; Shapov
- Producers: Axwell; Ingrosso; Reuterskiöld; Shapov

Axwell singles chronology
"Barricade" (2016)	"Belong" (2016)	"Nobody Else" (2018)

Shapov singles chronology
"Future Rave" (2016)	"Belong" (2016)	"Beats Do Work" (2016)

"Belong" is a song by Swedish DJ Axwell and Russian musician Shapov. It was remixed by D.O.D. A global music video competition was held as Axwell partnered with Revolt.TV to reveal the winner of the competition.

== Music video ==
Panchito, a white Maltese who attempts to return to home, finds himself going through and 'battling' the harsh environment. His owners appear at the end of the video. The video was directed by Jose Javy Ferrer.

== Track listing ==
No.	Title	Length
1.	"Belong"	3:24
2.	"Belong" (Axwell & Years Remode Edit)	3:37

== Charts ==
=== Weekly charts ===
Chart (2016)	Peak position
Hungary (Dance Top 40)	28
Sweden (Sverigetopplistan)	78

Chart (2023)	Peak position
Hungary (Single Top 40)	22

=== Year-end charts ===
Chart (2016)	Position
Hungary (Dance Top 40)	95
