= Don't You Worry Child =

2012 single by Swedish House Mafia

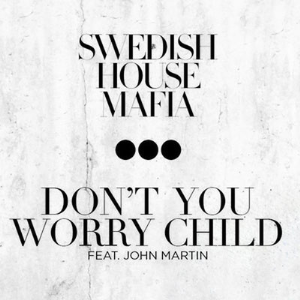

Single by Swedish House Mafia featuring John Martin

from the album Until Now
- Released: 14 September 2012
- Genre: Progressive house
- Length: 3:32 (radio edit); 6:43 (extended mix)
- Label: Virgin; Astralwerks; Polydor
- Songwriters: Axel Hedfors; Steve Angello; Sebastian Ingrosso; John Martin Lindström; Michel Zitron
- Producer: Swedish House Mafia

Swedish House Mafia singles chronology
"Greyhound" (2012)	"Don't You Worry Child" (2012)	"It Gets Better" (2021)

John Martin singles chronology
"Save the World" (2011)	"Don't You Worry Child" (2012)	"Reload" (2013)

Digital and streaming cover

"Don't You Worry Child" is the sixth single released by Swedish house music supergroup Swedish House Mafia. It is the last single from their second compilation album, Until Now, featuring vocals from Swedish singer John Martin. In the United States, it is the act's second number-one single on Billboard's Dance/Mix Show Airplay chart, following "Save the World". It is the group's biggest hit single to date, as well as the final single released before their disbandment in early 2013. It was released to widespread acclaim and received a Grammy nomination for Best Dance Recording in the 2013 Grammy Awards, as did its predecessor, "Save the World", the previous year. The song is written in the key of D major, and has a tempo of 128 beats per minute.

== History ==
In May 2010, songwriters John Martin and Michel Zitron were in the latter's studio in Stockholm writing material, both recalling their lives when Zitron started opening up about his upbringing in a broken home in Stockholm, mentioning the divorce between his parents. The song's chorus was taken verbatim from Zitron's father, while the pre-chorus derives from the songwriters' discovery of young love, inspiring the lyrics "Upon a hill across the blue lake/ That’s where I had my first heartbreak." Martin and Zitron wound up finishing the song later in the month and recorded a demo of the complete writing product. The song was originally meant to launch their own "electro-pop indie duo", however Zitron would later send the demo to Swedish House Mafia group member Sebastian Ingrosso alongside a few other demos in December 2010. Ingrosso would later contact the songwriters to help work on what would later become "Save the World", which was released over a year prior to "Don't You Worry Child".

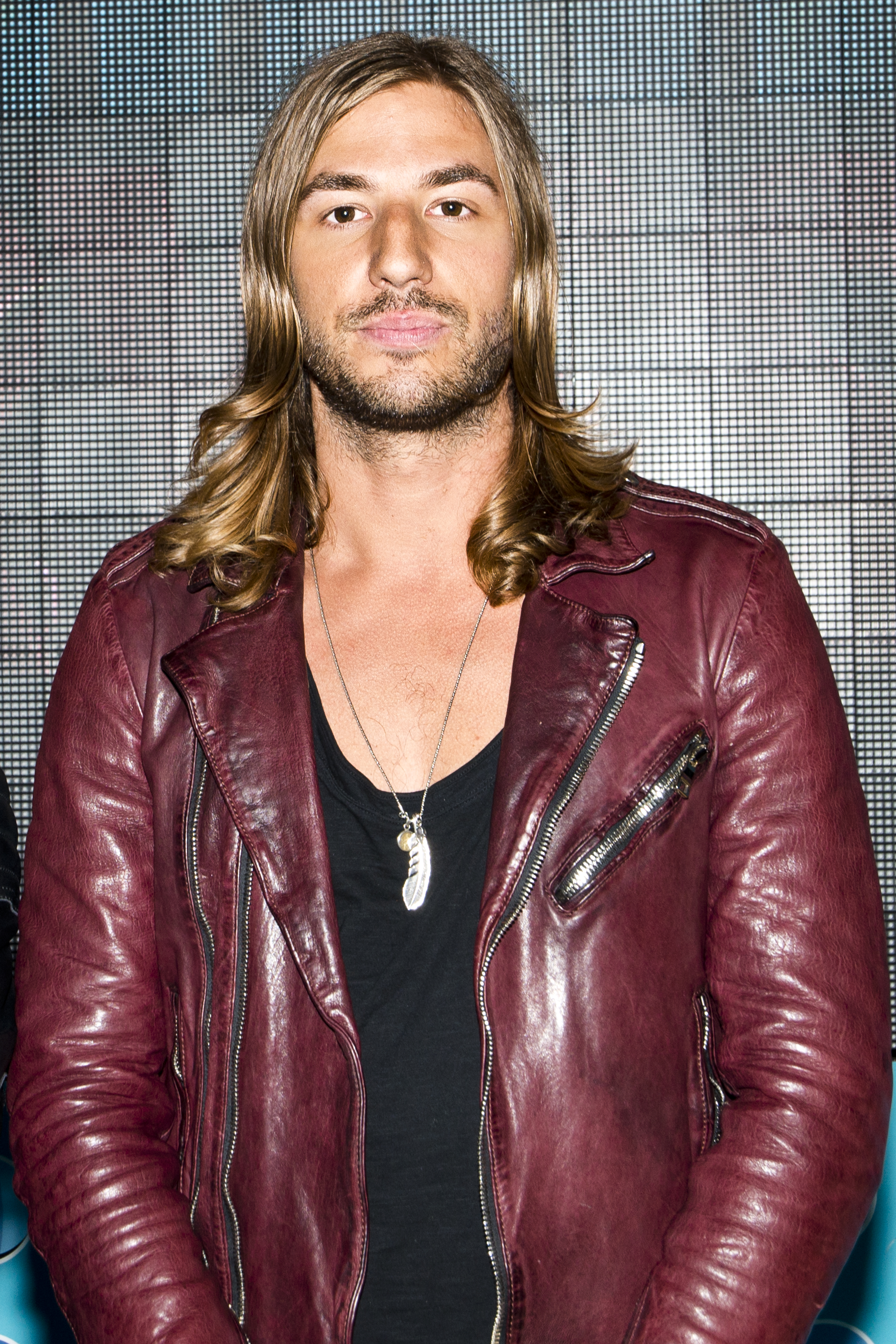
John Martin, a contributing songwriter and the featured singer of "Don't You Worry Child".

The following year in January, while in a Los Angeles music studio with fellow supergroup members Axwell and Steve Angello, Ingrosso phoned Zitron and Martin to "send [him] those three songs that [Zitron] played to [him] in the studio". Ingrosso called back Zitron after receiving the files to tell Zitron that Axwell was "lying on the fucking couch, almost crying" after listening to "Don't You Worry Child", before requesting to have the song for themselves. The supergroup then started to become embroiled in a long production process that "revealed personal tensions" as depicted in their 2014 documentary Leave the World Behind.

The song was announced during the Swedish House Mafia's tour of Australia while they played at Future Music Festival 2012. They say it was made from the inspiration they took from the beauty of Australia. The title "Don't You Worry Child" was mentioned a few times, with hints from the group members themselves on their Twitter pages. When it was announced that the tour the Swedish House Mafia was about to set on would be their last, a farewell single was also announced – "Don't You Worry Child" being that single. The song had its live debut at the Swedish House Mafia's Milton Keynes Bowl concert and its radio debut on Pete Tong's BBC Radio 1 show on 10 August 2012.

The song was included on their tour One Last Tour, which ended in Miami where they parted ways for five years.

== Chart and sales performance ==
In the United Kingdom, "Don't You Worry Child" made its debut at number one with first week sales of 135,000 copies. It sold 632,000 copies in the United Kingdom in 2012, the 13th best-selling single of that year.

In the United States, the song became Swedish House Mafia's biggest hit, peaking at number 6 on the Billboard Hot 100, making it their first and only top ten single. The song has sold over 3 million copies in the United States as of March 2014, and over 5.5 million copies worldwide.

== Music video ==
A music video for the song was released alongside the single, filmed on location at the group's final British performance on 14 July 2012 at the National Bowl in Milton Keynes.

It is the most viewed video for Swedish House Mafia on YouTube, reaching 1 billion views on August 19, 2024.

== Track listing ==
Digital download – EP
No.	Title	Length
1.	"Don't You Worry Child" (Radio Edit)	3:32
2.	"Don't You Worry Child" (Extended Mix)	6:43
3.	"Don't You Worry Child" (Acoustic Version)	4:17
4.	"Save the World" (Zedd Remix)	6:21

=== Remixes ===
No.	Title	Length
1.	"Don't You Worry Child" (Tom Staar & Kryder Remix)	6:20
2.	"Don't You Worry Child" (Promise Land Remix)	5:45
3.	"Don't You Worry Child" (Joris Voorn Remix)	7:03

== Notable covers ==
- The Belgian Flemish boyband 3M8S released a cover that charted on the Belgian Ultratop Singles Chart.

== In popular culture ==
The track has been used during various television programmes around the world. It was featured as one of the opening tracks during the Grand Final of the Eurovision Song Contest 2016 in Stockholm, Sweden. It was performed by a group of children in the British soap opera Emmerdale at the funeral of the character Gemma Andrews. The song is playable in the video games Just Dance 2014 and Just Dance 2015 and downloadable in Just Dance Unlimited and Just Dance+. In 2015 the Swedish Army Music Ensemble played Don't You Worry Child In Honor of His Majesty the King's 70th Birthday. On 12 December 2023 the trio performed the song at the FIFA Club World Cup opening ceremony in Jeddah, Saudi Arabia.

== Charts ==
=== Weekly charts ===
2012–2014 weekly chart performance
Chart (2012–2014)	Peak position
Australia (ARIA)	1
Austria (Ö3 Austria Top 40)	5
Belgium (Ultratop 50 Flanders)	4
Belgium (Ultratop 50 Wallonia)	10
Brazil Airplay (Billboard Brasil Hot 100)	23
Brazil Hot Pop Songs	1
Canada Hot 100 (Billboard)	9
Colombia Airplay (National-Report)	20
Czech Republic Airplay (ČNS IFPI)	8
Czech Republic Singles Digital (ČNS IFPI)	64
Denmark (Tracklisten)	2
Finland (Suomen virallinen lista)	4
France (SNEP)	37
Germany (GfK)	9
Greece Digital (Billboard)	6
Hungary (Dance Top 40)	4
Hungary (Rádiós Top 40)	6
Hungary (Single Top 40)	10
Ireland (IRMA)	2
Italy (FIMI)	8
Luxembourg Digital (Billboard)	7
Mexico Anglo Airplay (Monitor Latino)	2
Netherlands (Dutch Top 40)	5
Netherlands (Single Top 100)	5
New Zealand (Recorded Music NZ)	2
Norway (VG-lista)	2
Poland Dance (ZPAV)	17
Portugal Digital (Billboard)	4
Russia Airplay (TopHit)	8
Scottish Singles Sales (Official Charts)	1
Slovakia Airplay (ČNS IFPI)	2
Slovenia Airplay (SloTop50)	20
Spain (Promusicae)	11
Sweden (Sverigetopplistan)	1
Switzerland (Schweizer Hitparade)	7
Turkey (Turkish Singles Chart)	8
UK Singles (Official Charts)	1
UK Dance (Official Charts)	1
Ukraine Airplay (TopHit)	19
US Billboard Hot 100	6
US Hot Dance/Electronic Songs (Billboard)	2
US Adult Pop Airplay (Billboard)	14
US Dance Club Songs (Billboard)	1
US Hot Latin Songs (Billboard)	9
US Pop Airplay (Billboard)	2
US Rhythmic Airplay (Billboard)	8
Venezuela Airplay (Record Report)	62
Venezuela Pop Rock Airplay (Record Report)	1

2021 weekly chart performance
Chart (2021)	Peak position
Finland Airplay (Radiosoittolista)	88

2023 weekly chart performance
Chart (2023)	Peak position
Finland Airplay (Radiosoittolista)	68

2024 weekly chart performance
Chart (2024)	Peak position
Finland Airplay (Radiosoittolista)	69

2026 weekly chart performance
Chart (2026)	Peak position
Finland Airplay (Radiosoittolista)	86

=== Year-end charts ===
2012 year-end chart performance for "Don't You Worry Child"
Chart (2012)	Position
Australia (ARIA)	10
Austria (Ö3 Austria Top 40)	73
Belgium (Ultratop Flanders)	42
Germany (Media Control AG)	94
Hungary (Dance Top 40)	50
Hungary (Rádiós Top 40)	48
Italy (FIMI)	41
Netherlands (Dutch Top 40)	43
Netherlands (Single Top 100)	50
New Zealand (Recorded Music NZ)	22
Russia Airplay (TopHit)	162
Sweden (Sverigetopplistan)	6
Switzerland (Schweizer Hitparade)	70
UK Singles (Official Charts Company)	13
US Dance Club Songs (Billboard)	24

2013 year-end chart performance for "Don't You Worry Child"
Chart (2013)	Position
Australia (ARIA)	65
Austria (Ö3 Austria Top 40)	69
Belgium (Ultratop Flanders)	83
Belgium (Ultratop Wallonia)	93
Brazil (Crowley Broadcast Analysis)	5
Canada (Canadian Hot 100)	23
Germany (Media Control AG)	51
Hungary (Dance Top 40)	12
Hungary (Rádiós Top 40)	24
Italy (FIMI)	62
Netherlands (Dutch Top 40)	130
New Zealand (Recorded Music NZ)	37
Russia Airplay (TopHit)	27
Slovenia (SloTop50)	34
Spain (PROMUSICAE)	47
Sweden (Sverigetopplistan)	18
Switzerland (Schweizer Hitparade)	33
UK Singles (Official Charts Company)	58
Ukraine Airplay (TopHit)	30
US Billboard Hot 100	26
US Hot Dance/Electronic Songs (Billboard)	10
US Mainstream Top 40 (Billboard)	8
US Rhythmic (Billboard)	36

2014 year-end chart performance for "Don't You Worry Child"
Chart (2014)	Position
Hungary (Dance Top 40)	91

=== Decade-end charts ===
2010s-end chart performance for "Don't You Worry Child"
Chart (2010–2019)	Position
Australia (ARIA)	49
UK Singles (OCC)	81

== Certifications ==
Certifications and sales for "Don't You Worry Child"
Region	Certification	Certified units/sales
Australia (ARIA)	11× Platinum	770,000^{‡}
Austria (IFPI Austria)	Gold	15,000^{*}
Belgium (BRMA)	Gold	15,000^{*}
Brazil (Pro-Música Brasil)	Gold	30,000^{‡}
Canada (Music Canada)	9× Platinum	720,000^{‡}
Denmark (IFPI Danmark)	Gold	15,000^{^}
Finland (Musiikkituottajat)	Gold	5,322
Germany (BVMI)	3× Gold	450,000^{‡}
Italy (FIMI)	2× Platinum	60,000^{*}
Mexico (AMPROFON)	2× Platinum	120,000^{*}
Netherlands (NVPI)	Gold	10,000^{^}
New Zealand (RMNZ)	6× Platinum	180,000^{‡}
Spain (Promusicae)	2× Platinum	120,000^{‡}
Sweden (GLF)	9× Platinum	360,000^{‡}
Switzerland (IFPI Switzerland)	Platinum	30,000^{^}
United Kingdom (BPI)	4× Platinum	2,400,000^{‡}
United States (RIAA)	5× Platinum	5,000,000^{‡}
Streaming
Denmark (IFPI Danmark)	3× Platinum	5,400,000^{†}
^{*} Sales figures based on certification alone.^{^} Shipments figures based on certification alone.^{‡} Sales+streaming figures based on certification alone.^{†} Streaming-only figures based on certification alone.

== Release history ==
Release dates for "Don't You Worry Child"
Region	Date	Format	Label
Various	14 September 2012	Digital download	Virgin; EMI; Polydor
United Kingdom	8 October 2012	Digital download	Virgin; EMI; Polydor

== See also ==
- List of best-selling singles in Australia
- List of number-one dance singles of 2012 (U.S.)
