= Get Dumb =

Single by Axwell, Angello, Ingrosso and Laidback Luke

from the album Until One
- Released: June 2007
- Genre: Dance, electro house
- Length: 2:47
- Label: Big & Dirty; Data (UK)
- Songwriter(s): Axwell; Steve Angello; Sebastian Ingrosso; Luke van Scheppingen
- Producer(s): Axwell; Angello; Ingrosso; Laidback Luke

"Get Dumb" is a 2007 single by Swedish DJs Axwell, Steve Angello and Sebastian Ingrosso, (the three later known as Swedish House Mafia) along with Dutch DJ Laidback Luke. It was the first of two songs to feature all four artists, followed by "Leave the World Behind" in 2009. The song was also the first ever collaboration by the Swedish trio before their formation as a supergroup. The song charted in the Netherlands, peaking at #45.

== Track listing ==
UK digital download
| No. | Title | Length |
|---|---|---|
| 1. | "Get Dumb" (Radio Edit) | 2:45 |
| 2. | "Get Dumb" (Original Mix) | 6:30 |
| 3. | "Get Dumb" (Mark Knight's Dex Ray Dub) | 8:17 |
| 4. | "Get Dumb" (Giorgio Prezioso and Libex Remix) | 7:01 |

== Credits ==
Produced at Groove Motel, Stockholm

- Vocals – Sebastian Ingrosso
- Drums – Axwell
- Keyboards – Steve Angello
- Percussion – Laidback Luke
- Label: Big & Dirty

== Charts ==
| Chart (2007) | Peak; position |
|---|---|
| Belgium Dance (Ultratop Flanders) | 5 |
| Belgium Dance (Ultratop Wallonia) | 5 |
| Netherlands (Single Top 100) | 45 |
