= Axwell =

Swedish DJ, remixer and record producer (born 1977)

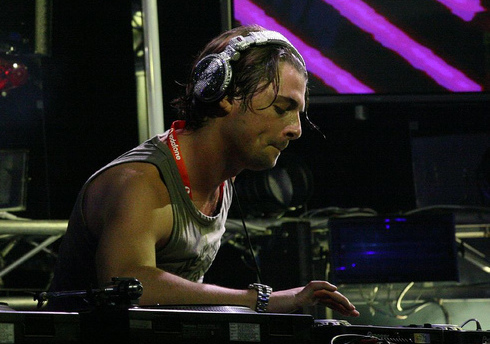
- Axwell in Melbourne, 2007

Background information
- Born: Axel Christofer Hedfors; 18 December 1977 (age 48); Sweden
- Origin: Lund, Malmöhus County, Sweden
- Genres: Progressive house; electro house; funky house
- Occupations: DJ; record producer; remixer
- Instruments: Music sequencer; synthesizers; drum machine
- Years active: 1995–present
- Labels: Axtone; Data; Ministry of Sound; Def Jam; Soulfuric; Ultra
- Member of: Swedish House Mafia; Axwell Λ Ingrosso; Supermode
- Website: axwell.com

Axel Christofer Hedfors (Swedish pronunciation: [ˈǎksɛl krɪˈstɔ̌fːɛr ˈhêː(d)fɔʂ]; born 18 December 1977), better known by his stage name Axwell, is a Swedish DJ, record producer, remixer and owner of Axtone Records. He is a member of Swedish House Mafia along with Sebastian Ingrosso and Steve Angello. He is a two-time DJ Awards winner, and in 2013 he was placed 19th on the DJ Magazine Top 100 DJ Poll.

== Early life ==
Axwell's interest in music appeared at an early age, having taught himself to play the drums by age nine. Four years later, the 13-year-old exchanged his drums for a computer so he could create each element of his music independently. In his teenage years he attended Fäladsgården Elementary School. Axwell released limited copies of a techno/hard trance EP on vinyl under the name OXL in 1995. During his teenage years, he was also active in the tracking music scene under the moniker Quazar, releasing acid techno tracks made with FastTracker 2 and NoiseTracker.

== Musical career ==
=== 1995–2003: Career beginnings ===
Axwell began his career remixing songs by other artists, his first official remix being released in 2000. Some of his most notable early remixes include: Usher's "Burn" (BMG), Room 5's "Make Luv" (Positiva), Clipse & Faith Evans "Ma, I Don't Love Her" (RCA), Stonebridge's "Put 'em High" (Hed Kandi), N*E*R*D's single "Maybe" (Virgin), and more recently Hard-Fi's "Hard to Beat", Deep Dish's "Dreams", Pharrell's "Angel", Nelly Furtado's "Promiscuous" and Madonna's "Jump".

Axwell has also been responsible for Jetlag's "So Right", which came out in September 2002 on Soulfuric, featuring the vocals of Noel McKoy and co-produced with Brian Tappert. In late 2002 Axwell went back to his roots and produced a track under his own name – "Lead Guitar" which was released by fellow Swede Stonebridge on his Stoney Boy imprint.

Also leading the way has been Mambana, his collaboration with Isabel Fructuoso (of Afro Medusa fame). Signed to Soulfuric Recordings, they have released three tracks since 2002. "No Reason" was their debut single, which hit the top spot in all the Hype/Buzz charts that Summer and was featured in the sets of all the top DJs including Little Louie Vega, Danny Rampling and Ben Watt. The follow ups were "Felicidad" and "Libre". "Libre" was released in 2003 and was arguably bigger than its predecessor. "Libre" was licensed to more than 12 different territories and featured on compilations that sold in excess of half a million copies.

2003 saw Axwell recording for London-based label suSU (the UK home of Masters at Work) under the guise of Starbeach. The track was called "Get Naked" & featured the vocal talents of D'Empress (from Mutiny). This was followed up by his version of Evelyn Thomas' classic "High Energy". In the autumn of 2003 Axwell's "Wait a Minute", featuring the vocals of Nevada, was released on Soulfuric's sub-label Device. This song was a club smash that gained support from the likes of Pete Tong, Junior Jack, Kid Creme.

=== 2004–2007: Singles and breakthrough ===
By late 2004, Axwell released "Feel the Vibe", which was re-released through Ministry of Sound in 2005 with new lead vocals from Tara McDonald who also wrote the song as "Feel the Vibe ('Til The Morning Comes)". McDonald's voice and writing helped secure the track as a radio winner and this track became one of the biggest cross over dance records of 2005. It was a breakthrough record for both Axwell & Tara McDonald. It peaked at #1 in UK Dance Singles Chart and #16 in the UK Singles Chart. In addition to a re-release of "Feel the Vibe" on Ministry of Sound, he has produced several club remixes, as well as his own productions, including "Get Over Here" by Rasmus Faber, "2 Million Ways" by C-Mos, "Turn On the Music" by Roger Sanchez, as well as his collaboration with Sebastian Ingrosso on Ernesto vs Bastian's "Dark Side of the Moon". Alongside his original productions, he collaborated with the Swedish producer Ingrosso on "Together". Axwell's most successful release of 2005 was "Watch the Sunrise", with Steve Edwards on vocals (famous for Cassius' "The Sound of Violence"). The track reached #3 in UK Dance Singles Chart and BBC Radio 1 Dance Chart. In between Axwell's productions he also found time to create Axtone, his own record label.

In the spring of 2006, Axwell and Steve Angello, under the Supermode alias, remixed Bronski Beat's "Smalltown Boy", producing "Tell Me Why" which was released under the Data label. Later, he teamed up with Eric Prydz and produced the tracks 123 and 321 releasing them under the alias AxEr. October saw Axwell make his DJ Mag entry at number 93. That same year, Axwell branched into a New York house sound with his mix of "Counting Down the Days", a song by Sunfreakz. Axwell ignored the vocals (sung by Andrea Britton) for his mix, which was a blend of cutting progressive-house sounds and ethereal keyboards. The Israeli DJ Offer Nissim featured the mix prominently during his set at the March 2007 closing party for Manhattan's Roxy. In August 2007, Axwell teamed up with performer Max'C to create the track "I Found U", which made it to #6 in the UK Singles Chart. The 2007 DJ Mag polls saw Axwell climb 60 places to number 33.

=== 2008–2013: Swedish House Mafia ===
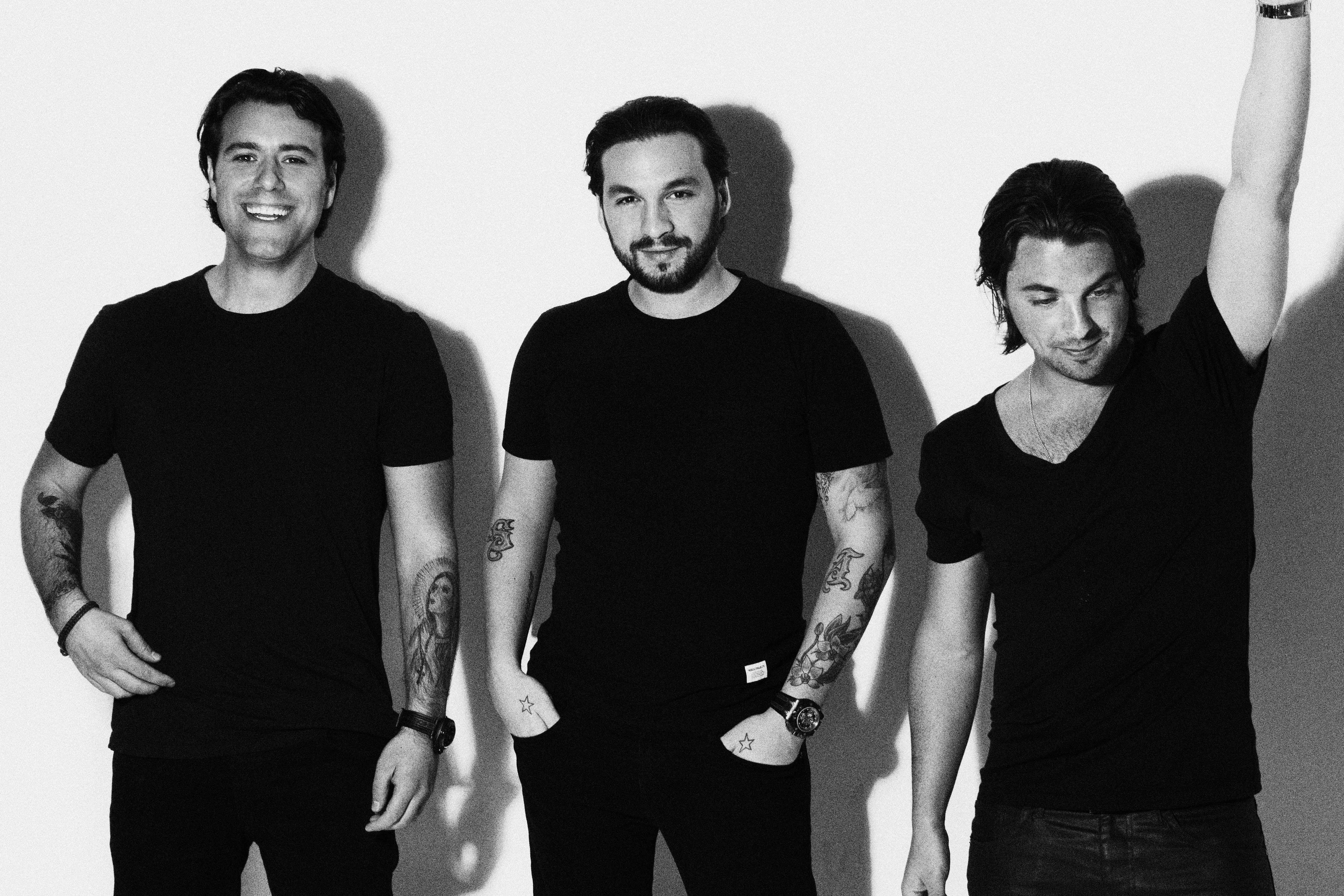
Axwell (right) with Swedish House Mafia during their Until Now photoshoot in 2012

==== 2007–2008: Group formation, and continued solo work ====
On 12 August 2007, Axwell, Steve Angello and Sebastian Ingrosso played the Main Room at Cream Amnesia under the alias The Swedish House Mafia as part of Radio 1's Essential Mix Ibiza. The group, which officially formed in late 2008, had been performing shows like this for some time along with fellow Swedish DJ Eric Prydz. However, Prydz decided not to join the group, describing himself as a 'control freak' in the studio who can't abide collaboration, even with close friends. In 2007, the trio released their first single together, "Get Dumb", however this was credited under their individual names.

In 2008, Axwell co-wrote and co-produced the song "Rain on Me" with Cyndi Lauper for her 2008 album Bring Ya to the Brink. During June of that year he released a song which was originally produced as a remix for David Guetta's "Everytime We Touch". Somehow, Guetta rejected the remix so Axwell took the instrumental of the song, teamed up with Bob Sinclar who brought in vocalist Ron Carroll and together they created "What a Wonderful World". In August, Axwell collaborated with an Australian DJ and producer, Dirty South, and released "Open Your Heart". At the same time, he also remixed "Hometown Glory" by Adele. The remix was released in two versions, "Original mix" with more vocals and more club oriented "Remode". October saw Axwell again climb the DJ Mag top 100 DJ poll with positions number 20.

==== 2009–2010: Until One, and Axtone Vol.1 ====
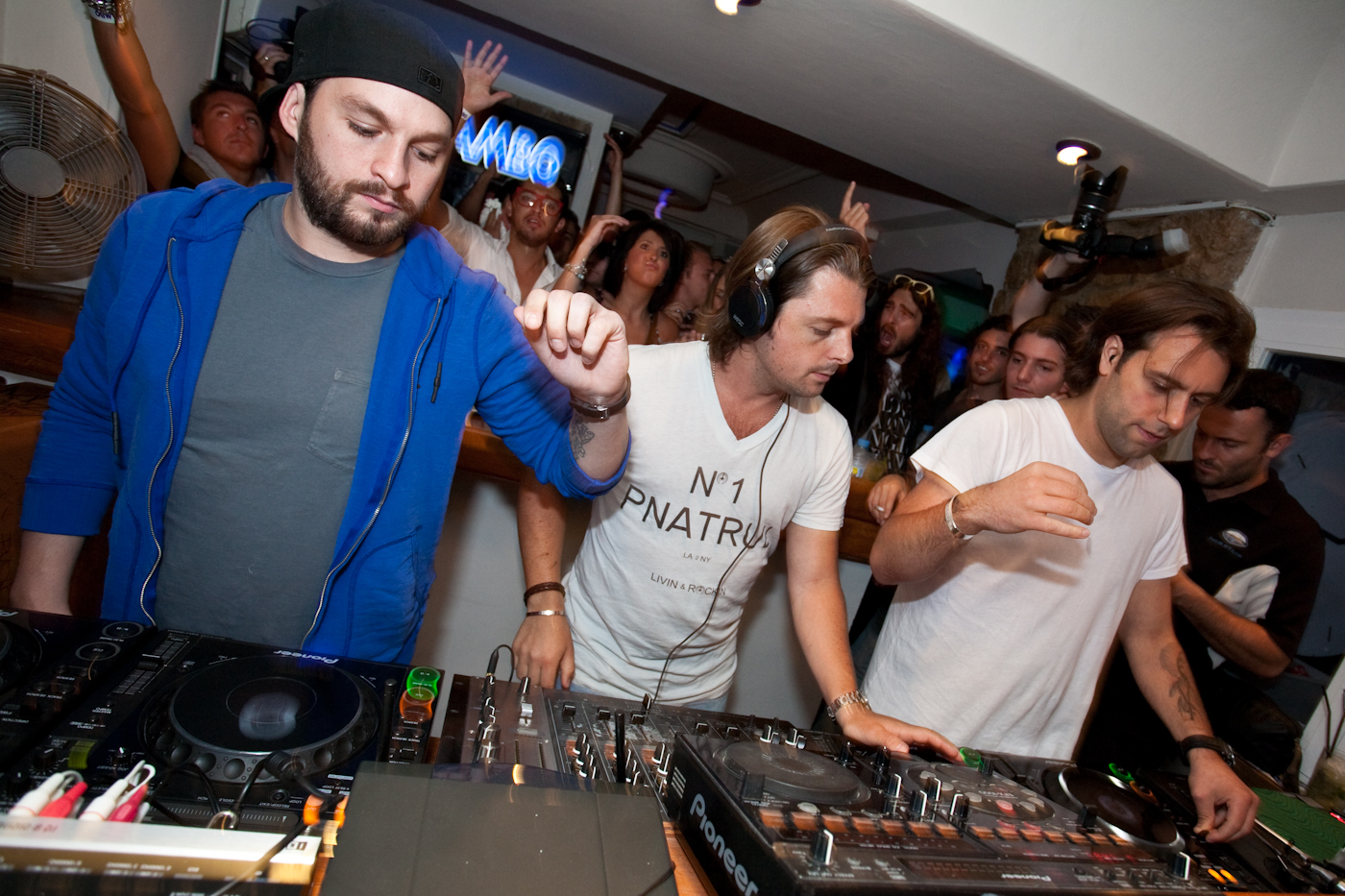
Axwell (centre) performing with Swedish House Mafia in Ibiza, 2011

In 2009, Axwell released "Leave the World Behind" with Swedish House Mafia. The song featured vocal from Deborah Cox and was again credited under the group's individual names. In 2009, Axwell chart number 14 on the DJ Mag poll. 2010 saw Swedish House Mafia release their first singles credited as such. The two singles, "One (Your Name)" (featuring Pharrell Williams) and "Miami 2 Ibiza" (featuring Tinie Tempah), were commercial successes becoming a top 20 hit in many European countries. These songs were featured on Swedish House Mafia's debut album Until One (released 25 October 2010) which acted as a studio and compilation album as it contained much of their own work (as a group and individually) as well as the work of other producers as well. On 13 June 2010, Axwell released his own studio/compilation album entitled Axtone Vol.1. In 2010, Axwell achieved his highest position on the DJ Mag top 100 DJ poll, charting at number 10.

==== 2011–2012: Until Now, Grammy Awards, and Album Production ====
In February 2011, Axwell and Dirty South's remix of the song "Sweet Disposition" originally by The Temper Trap, received a nomination for the 53rd Grammy Awards in the category for Best Remixed Recording, Non-Classical. Meanwhile, in May, he released "Save the World" with the rest of the Swedish House Mafia. The song featured vocals from Swedish singer John Martin and has gained certifications across Europe including 5× Platinum in Sweden. The DJ Mag polls saw Axwell chart at number 12 this year. Towards the end of the year and the beginning of 2012, Axwell continue to work with Swedish House Mafia releasing two more singles "Antidote" and "Greyhound". He also worked with Flo Rida on the American's fourth studio album Wild Ones, co-producing two of its most successful singles "Wild Ones" and "Let It Roll".

On 24 April 2012, Axwell released his remix of "In My Mind" by Ivan Gough and Feenixpawl featuring Georgi Kay on Beatport. It was nominated for the 55th Grammy Awards in the category of Best Remixed Recording, Non-Classical. In June, the release of Usher's Looking 4 Myself saw the second album which Axwell co-produced with the songs "Numb" and "Euphoria" with the latter receiving a remix from the entire Swedish House Mafia. In September, Swedish House Mafia released their most commercially successful song which again featured vocals from John Martin. "Don't You Worry Child" became a top 10 in many countries gaining multi-platinum awards in many also. This along with previous solo and group work from all Swedish House Mafia members featured on the trio's second and final album Until Now which was released on 22 October 2012.

==== 2013: One Last Tour and continued solo work ====
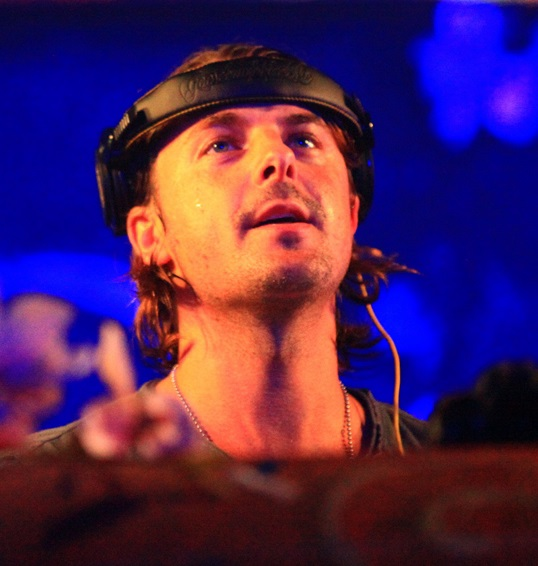
Axwell performing at TomorrowWorld in 2013

In November 2012, Swedish House Mafia kicked off their One Last Tour after its announcement in June of that year. The supergroup stated that the final leg of this tour would be their last and the group would split up after its conclusion at Ultra Music Festival Miami 2013. Following the group's farewell, Axwell and fellow Swedish House Mafia member Sebastian Ingrosso announced their new night club at Ushuaïa, Ibiza, called "Departures". 2013 saw Axwell's new single "Center of the Universe" released for digital download with the song reaching number one on Beatport. His subsequent single, with Sick Individuals feat Taylr Renee, "I Am" was released on 16 September and also reached number one on Beatport. Remixes for "I Am" were released on 26 January 2014 through Axwell's own Axtone label. Remixing artists included Deorro, Dimitri Vegas & Like Mike, Jacob Plant and Nu:Tone. 2013 saw Axwell climb positions in the DJ Mag top 100 DJ poll for the first time since 2010. He climbed 4 places from his 2012 position achieve place 19. 2013 also saw Axwell collaborate with Sebastian Ingrosso on "Roar" for the Monsters University Soundtrack.

=== 2014–present: Axwell Λ Ingrosso ===
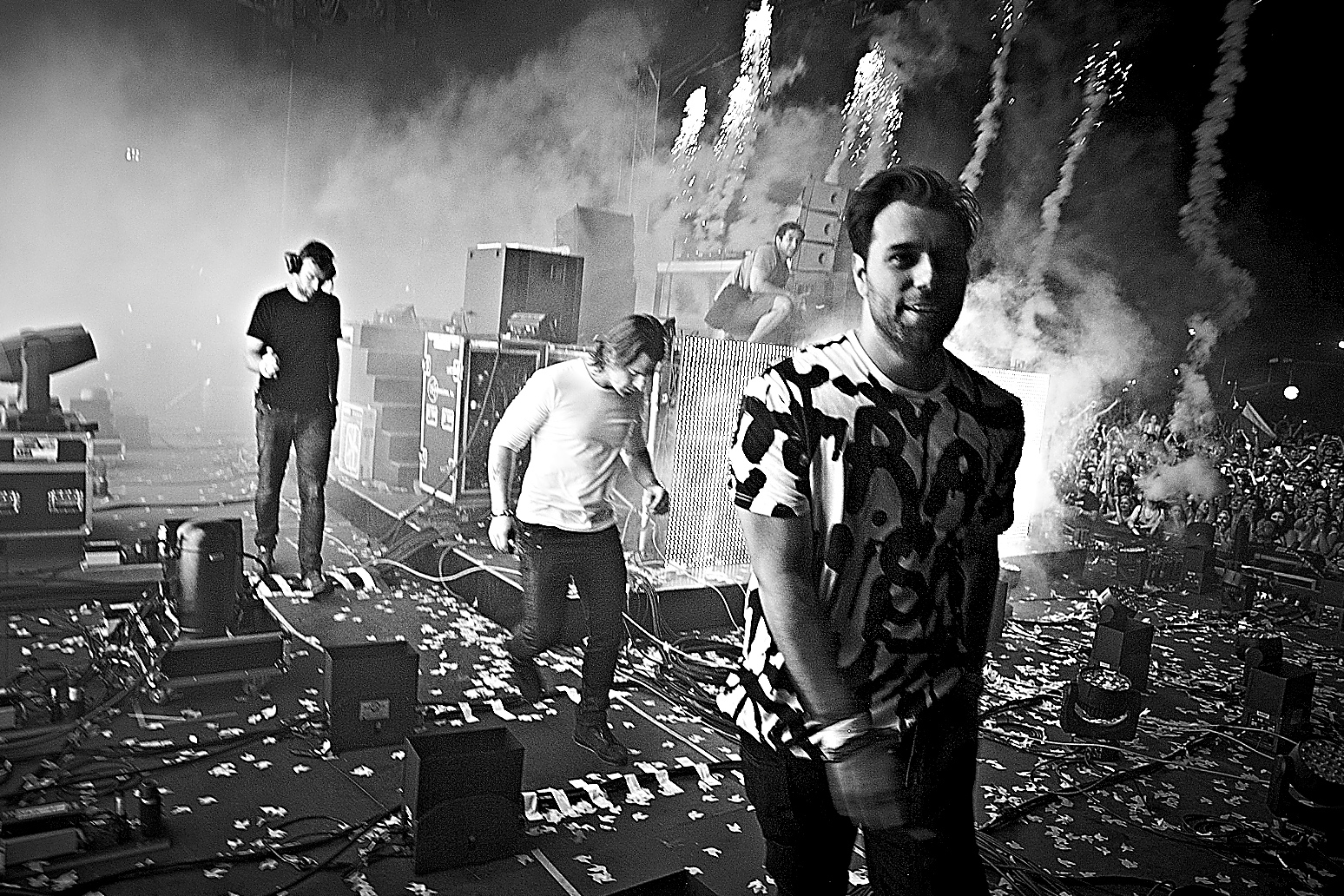
Axwell (centre) on stage with Ingrosso (right) in 2014

==== 2014: X4 and Governors Ball ====
Axwell joined forces with Sebastian Ingrosso, debuting their new collective at the 2014 Governors Ball Music Festival in New York City – their new group named Axwell Λ Ingrosso, this followed the release of their debut EP X4. One of the songs from this EP, "We Come, We Rave, We Love", was the final version of a song started by Swedish House Mafia and was played frequently during their One Last Tour. A single, "Something New" was released from the EP in November of that year.

==== 2015–2017: Single releases and solo work ====
In the early months of 2015 Axwell released his second and third single under the Axwell Λ Ingrosso collaboration entitled "On My Way" and "Can't Hold Us Down" respectively. In June, the duo released their fourth single named "Sun Is Shining". This song became number 1 in Sweden and was Axwell's (and Ingrosso's) first number 1 since "Don't You Worry Child". In July the duo headlined Tomorrowland closing Night Two.

In November 2015, "This Time" was released under Axwell Λ Ingrosso and "Dream Bigger" on New Year's Eve, Axwell also released his first solo single since the formation of the group entitled "Waiting for so Long". 2016 saw Axwell continue to release music as solo artist as well as adding vocals from Pharrell Williams to "Dream Bigger". His solo releases included the singles "Barricade" and "Belong". The latter received a VIP remix later in the year, and the first was later to feature on the duo's debut album, More Than You Know. 2016 also saw Axwell remix Ingrosso's track "Dark River". In May 2016 the duo released their seventh single "Thinking About You" with their eighth following in February 2017 entitled "I Love You" which featured vocals from Kid Ink.

==== 2017: More Than You Know ====
In early May 2017, Axwell released the first single from his second EP with Sebastian Ingrosso under their collective entitled "Renegade" with the EP and its title song, "More Than You Know", being released in the latter parts of that month. The song was a commercial success, becoming a chart hit gaining certifications in many countries. In July, Axwell perform at Tomorrowland under Axwell Λ Ingrosso which were one of the headliners for the event. October 2017 saw Axwell release his long-awaited remix of Pauls Paris's 2013 song "Make Up Your Mind", and on 8 December 2017, the duo's debut album, More Than You Know, was released. The album contained all of their previously released music and their new single "Dreamer".

=== 2018-present: Swedish House Mafia reunion and Axwell Λ Ingrosso hiatus ===
On the final weekend of March 2018, Axwell performed at Ultra Miami 2018 as Axwell Λ Ingrosso. The same festival also saw Axwell perform as Swedish House Mafia as the group reunited after a five-year hiatus on the festival's 20th anniversary. On 29 June, Axwell Λ Ingrosso released their first single since their debut studio album, More Than You Know, featuring British singer RØMANS called "Dancing Alone". A month later the duo performed at Tomorrowland 2018, in which they paid tribute to the late DJ Avicii as part of their set. In August 2018, Axwell Λ Ingrosso announced that they would be going on hiatus in order to focus on the Swedish House Mafia reunion and 2019 tour. On 22 June 2019, Axwell announced that his record label, Axtone Records, would launch Axtone Academy, a music academy which would pair aspiring producers with some of the label's veterans to help young musicians into the music industry. Axwell cancelled his solo performance at the Electric Love festival catering to ‘unforeseen circumstances' as communicated by Axwell's Management team.

== See also ==
- List of Number 1 Dance Hits (United States)
- List of artists who reached number one on the US Dance chart
- Swedish popular music
