= Until Now (Swedish House Mafia album) =

Compilation album by Swedish House Mafia
- Released: 19 October 2012
- Genres: Electro house; progressive house
- Length: 46:53
- Labels: Virgin; EMI; Astralwerks
- Producers: Axwell; Sebastian Ingrosso; Steve Angello; Knife Party; Ivan Gough; Feenixpawl; Alesso; Third Party

Swedish House Mafia chronology
Until One (2010)	Until Now (2012)	Paradise Again (2022)

Singles from Until Now
- 1. "Save the World" Released: 13 May 2011; 2. "Antidote" Released: 16 December 2011; 3. "Greyhound" Released: 12 March 2012; 4. "Don't You Worry Child" Released: 14 September 2012

Until Now is the second compilation album by Swedish house music supergroup Swedish House Mafia. The album was released on 19 October 2012 to mixed reviews by music critics who praised its singles and the rework of Coldplay's "Every Teardrop Is a Waterfall", but deemed the record to be more suited for live play than home listening. After the album was released, the trio announced that they would split up to continue with their separate projects. The album cover features a negative photo of Axwell, Ingrosso and Angello. The album contains 4 singles: "Save the World", "Antidote", "Greyhound" and "Don't You Worry Child", the latter of which went on to become the group's signature song and biggest hit single to date.

== Singles ==
- "Save the World" is the first single to be released from the album. The single featured vocals from Swedish singer John Martin. It charted at number 4 in Sweden.
- "Antidote" (vs. Knife Party) is the second single from the album and debuted at number 4 in the UK charts. The song's contains vocals by Swedish-American rapper-songwriter Adam Baptiste (also known as ADL), whose vocals are uncredited, co-written by Swedish songwriter Klas Åhlund.
- "Greyhound" is the third single from the album. The song was performed at the Madison Square Garden on 16 December 2011, and charted at number 3 in the US.
- "Don't You Worry Child" is the fourth single from the album. It was first performed at their final UK gig, at the Milton Keynes Bowl on 14 July 2012. It features John Martin on vocals. The single was released in Europe, Asia and Australia on 14 September 2012, 18 September in the US and Canada and 7 October in the UK.

== Promotion ==
Swedish House Mafia embarked on a tour, appropriately named "One Last Tour" which was their farewell tour. The tour began on 16 November 2012, and ended on 24 March 2013. It ran for 53 shows, and ended in Miami, when they parted ways.

== Critical reception ==
Professional ratings
Aggregate scores
Source	Rating
Metacritic	57/100
Review scores
Source	Rating
AllMusic	3.5/5 stars
Consequence of Sound	3.5/5 stars
Entertainment Weekly	B
The Guardian	2/5 stars
Las Vegas Weekly	1.5/5 stars
Los Angeles Times	2.5/5 stars
Mixmag	3/5 stars
Montreal Gazette	2.5/5 stars
musicOMH	2/5 stars
Q	2/5 stars

Until Now was met with mixed reviews from music critics. At Metacritic, which assigns a normalised rating out of 100 reviews from mainstream critics, the album received an average score of 57, based on 9 reviews, indicating "mixed or average reviews". David Jeffries from AllMusic commended the "dancefloor fillers" for being "bigger and more powerful this time out" while labelling "Don't You Worry Child" as the track that tops off the record, but stated that "there's little here that suggests Swedish House Mafia is more than the sum of its parts". Caroline Sullivan of The Guardian found that all of the songs were "subjected to the same heavy hand on the tiller: beats are stonkingly four-to-the-floor, singers wail, breakdowns shudder", but nonetheless commented on the album's "headbanging urgency", which prompts listeners to "tap a foot", thus classing it a success for the group. Ben Weisz from MusicOMH felt that with the exception of a few "euphoric gems", the album "never quite shakes the feeling of being a little gratuitous" especially since there "isn't enough creative spark on the record to justify its existence". The critic did find the "wobbling percussion" on "Leave the World Behind" to be "genuinely chilling" and hailed the remix of "Every Teardrop Is a Waterfall" to be the "greatest Coldplay remix ever fashioned" with its harmonies and breaks.

In The Washington Post, Allison Stewart observed that there was no shortage of "blissed-out, Euro-inspired tracks" and was impressed with the Coldplay rework and "Don't You Worry Child", which she described as "seamless, roof-rattling and capital-B Big". Robert Copsey from Digital Spy realised that although there was little new to be found within the songs, which "makes for an exhausting hour and 15 minutes", the album's intention was "never one of a cohesive, journey-leading record" but instead its strength lies in the group's live act: "In that sense, Until Now is a job well done".

Mikael Wood from Los Angeles Times observed that while there was nothing in the "vocal-heavy set" that "suggests an aversion to pop", that Until Now "sounds more like a beginning than an end" despite coinciding with the group's retirement. BBC's Matthew Horton noted the group's mastery of controlling the "ecstasy rush" as there is "barely a track in this loosely mixed set that doesn't wheel out the intensifying beats and rising acid synths of the big hands-in-the-air crescendo", but felt that it was "exhausting" and "impatient" due to them incorporating unearned "big moments" that were "thrown into the record whenever the ideas pot runs dry". Writing for Consequence of Sound, Derek Staples criticised the album's deluxe edition for being "excessively current" and "stuck in the recency effect" as there was no showcase of seasoned talent that would allow listeners to see their influences. The critic compared the record to Erol Alkan's Bugged Out Mix, which spanned four decades of tracks, however concluded that the record was still "exactly what they [the fans] wanted out of the trio". T'cha Dunlevy of Montreal Gazette labelled the album "a bit of an anticlimax" with its release being paired with the group's breakup announcement, yet noted the effective but "over the top and cringe-inducing" track makeovers of Miike Snow, Usher and Florence & the Machine. Aidin Vaziri from San Francisco Chronicle felt that even with the "psychotically high" energy level of the record, the songs would be "better suited playing in the background of Mountain Dew commercials than on headphones at home". Smith Galtney from Las Vegas Weekly commented that, "If Michael Bay made club music, it would sound just like Until Now", whose tracks are clocked in "EPMs (explosions per minute)" where "buildups begat crescendos and big moments merely exist to create even bigger ones". Ron Harris of The San Diego Union-Tribune criticised the album's predictability since previous electronica listeners will "know every note that is about to come and every drum roll that looms around each corner". The critic agreed that listeners who enjoy "fast and loud" beats "devoid" of their Chicago/Detroit framework roots will enjoy the record, but felt that it was "a touch simplistic" beneath its "flat mixing and uninventive tempo builds".

== Track listing ==
Standard edition
No.	Title	Writer(s)	Artist(s)	Length
1.	"Greyhound"	Axel Hedfors, Sebastian Ingrosso, and Steve Angello	Swedish House Mafia	6:50
2.	"Antidote"	Hedfors, Ingrosso, Angello, Rob Swire, Gareth McGrillen, Klas Åhlund, Adam Bapiste	Swedish House Mafia vs. Knife Party	6:13
3.	"In My Mind" (Axwell Mix featuring Georgi Kay)	Ivan Gough, Josh Soon, Aden Forte, Georgi Kay	Ivan Gough and Feenixpawl	5:06
4.	"Calling (Lose My Mind)" (featuring Ryan Tedder)	Ingrosso, Alessandro Linblad, Ryan Tedder, Matthew Bair	Sebastian Ingrosso and Alesso	3:25
5.	"Miami 2 Ibiza"	Hedfors, Angello, Ingrosso, Patrick Okogwu	Swedish House Mafia vs. Tinie Tempah	3:24
6.	"Lights"	Angello, Jonnie Macaire, Harry Bass	Steve Angello & Third Party	3:50
7.	"Don't You Worry Child" (featuring John Martin)	Martin, Hedfors, Ingrosso, Angello, Michel Zitron	Swedish House Mafia	3:32
8.	"Every Teardrop Is a Waterfall"	Guy Berryman, Jonny Buckland, Will Champion, Chris Martin, Castoni, Lagonda, Wycombe, Peter Allen, Adrienne Anderson	Coldplay vs. Swedish House Mafia	6:48
9.	"One (Your Name)" (featuring Pharrell)	Hedfors, Ingrosso, Angello, Pharrell Williams	Swedish House Mafia	3:03
10.	"Save the World"	Axwell, Ingrosso, Angello, Martin, Zitron, Vincent Pontare	Swedish House Mafia	3:33
Total length:				46:53

Deluxe edition / Europe standard edition (Continuous Mix)
No.	Title	Artist	Length
1.	"Greyhound"	Swedish House Mafia	4:10
2.	"Here We Go"	Hard Rock Sofa and Swanky Tunes	2:31
3.	"In My Mind" (Axwell Remix)	Ivan Gough and Feenixpawl featuring Georgi Kay	4:35
4.	"Calling (Lose My Mind)"	Sebastian Ingrosso and Alesso featuring Ryan Tedder	4:00
5.	"Atom" / "Leave the World Behind"	Nari & Milani / Axwell, Ingrosso, Angello and Laidback Luke	3:02
6.	"Antidote"	Swedish House Mafia and Knife Party	2:53
7.	"Walking Alone" / "Miami 2 Ibiza"	Dirty South and Those Usual Suspects featuring Erik Hecht/Swedish House Mafia vs Tinie Tempah	4:09
8.	"Resurrection (Axwell's Recut Club Version)" / "Paradise"	Michael Calfan/Coldplay	3:37
9.	"The Wave" (Thomas Gold Remix Edit)	Miike Snow	3:25
10.	"Ladi Dadi (Tommy Trash Remix)" / "Sing 2 Me" / "Alright"	Steve Aoki featuring Wynter Gordon / Thomas Gold / Red Carpet	4:09
11.	"The Island" (Steve Angello, AN21 and Max Vangeli Remix)	Pendulum	3:01
12.	"Lights"	Steve Angello and Third Party	3:31
13.	"Raise Your Head" / "Epic"	Alesso / Sandro Silva and Quintino	3:16
14.	"Three Triangles" / "Trio" / "Teenage Crime"	Hardwell / Arty, Matisse and Sadko / Adrian Lux	3:16
15.	"Reload"	Sebastian Ingrosso and Tommy Trash	3:54
16.	"Euphoria" (Swedish House Mafia Extended Dub)	Usher	3:27
17.	"Don't You Worry Child"	Swedish House Mafia featuring John Martin	3:58
18.	"Beating of My Heart (Matisse and Sadko Instrumental)" / "Sweet Disposition"	M-3OX featuring Heidrun / The Temper Trap	3:50
19.	"Every Teardrop Is a Waterfall"	Coldplay vs Swedish House Mafia	4:39
20.	"You've Got the Love (Mark Knight Remix)" / "One"	Florence and the Machine / Swedish House Mafia	4:24
21.	"Heart Is King" / "Save the World (Knife Party Remix)"	Axwell / Swedish House Mafia featuring John Martin	2:06
22.	"Save the World" / "Punk (Arty Rock-n-Rolla Mix)"	Swedish House Mafia / Ferry Corsten	3:52
Total length:			80:42

Digital download unmixed version
No.	Title	Artist	Length
1.	"Until Now" (Continuous DJ Mix)	Swedish House Mafia	79:56
2.	"Greyhound"	Swedish House Mafia	6:50
3.	"Here We Go"	Hard Rock Sofa and Swanky Tunes	6:01
4.	"In My Mind" (Axwell Mix)	Ivan Gough and Feenixpawl featuring Georgi Kay	6:39
5.	"Calling (Lose My Mind)" (Extended Club Mix)	Sebastian Ingrosso and Alesso featuring Ryan Tedder	6:13
6.	"Atom"	Nari & Milani	5:35
7.	"Leave the World Behind"	Axwell, Ingrosso, Angello and Laidback Luke featuring Deborah Cox	6:51
8.	"Antidote" (Radio Edit)	Swedish House Mafia and Knife Party	2:59
9.	"Walking Alone"	Dirty South and Those Usual Suspects featuring Erik Hecht	5:50
10.	"Miami 2 Ibiza" (Clean Radio Edit)	Swedish House Mafia featuring Tinie Tempah	2:56
11.	"Resurrection" (Axwell's Recut Club Version)	Michael Calfan	4:58
12.	"Paradise"	Coldplay	4:40
13.	"The Wave" (Thomas Gold Remix Edit)	Miike Snow	3:23
14.	"Ladi Dadi" (Tommy Trash Remix)	Steve Aoki featuring Wynter Gordon	5:15
15.	"Sing2Me"	Thomas Gold	7:02
16.	"Alright"	Red Carpet	6:42
17.	"The Island" (Steve Angello, AN21 and Max Vangeli Remix)	Pendulum	6:40
18.	"Lights"	Steve Angello and Third Party	5:08
19.	"Raise Your Head"	Alesso	5:51
20.	"Epic"	Sandro Silva and Quintino	5:57
21.	"Three Triangles"	Hardwell	7:18
22.	"Trio"	Arty, Matisse and Sadko	5:41
23.	"Teenage Crime"	Adrian Lux	6:05
24.	"Reload"	Sebastian Ingrosso and Tommy Trash	6:02
25.	"Euphoria" (Swedish House Mafia Extended Dub)	Usher	4:55
26.	"Don't You Worry Child" (Radio Edit)	Swedish House Mafia featuring John Martin	3:33
27.	"Beating of My Heart" (Matisse and Sadko Instrumental)	M-3ox featuring Heidrun	6:30
28.	"Sweet Disposition"	The Temper Trap	3:53
29.	"Every Teardrop Is a Waterfall"	Coldplay vs. Swedish House Mafia	5:23
30.	"You Got the Love" (Mark Knight Remix)	Florence and the Machine	8:08
31.	"One" (Radio Edit)	Swedish House Mafia	2:50
32.	"Heart Is King" (Original Mix)	Axwell	6:55
33.	"Save the World" (Knife Party Remix)	Swedish House Mafia	5:14
34.	"Save the World" (Radio Mix)	Swedish House Mafia	3:33
35.	"Punk" (Arty Rock-n-Rolla Mix)	Ferry Corsten	6:28
36.	"Save the World" (music video)	Swedish House Mafia	3:31
37.	"Antidote" (music video)	Swedish House Mafia	3:38
Total length:			295:06

- Credits and production taken from album booklet.

== Charts ==
=== Weekly charts ===
Weekly chart performance for Until Now
Chart (2012)	Peak position
Australian Albums (ARIA)	10
Austrian Albums (Ö3 Austria)	10
Belgian Albums (Ultratop Flanders)	6
Belgian Albums (Ultratop Wallonia)	12
Canadian Albums (Billboard)	7
Danish Albums (Hitlisten)	21
Dutch Albums (Album Top 100)	6
Finnish Albums (Suomen virallinen lista)	25
French Albums (SNEP)	41
German Albums (Offizielle Top 100)	26
Irish Compilation Albums (IRMA)	1
Italian Albums (FIMI)	10
New Zealand Albums (RMNZ)	29
Norwegian Albums (VG-lista)	21
Portuguese Albums (AFP)	17
South African Albums (RIAS)	4
Spanish Compilation Albums (PROMUSICAE)	3
Swedish Albums (Sverigetopplistan)	3
Swiss Albums (Schweizer Hitparade)	7
UK Compilation Albums (Official Charts)	1
UK Dance Albums (Official Charts)	1
US Billboard 200	14
US Top Dance Albums (Billboard)	1

=== Year-end charts ===
2012 year-end chart performance for Until Now
Chart (2012)	Position
Belgian Albums (Ultratop Flanders)	85
Swedish Albums (Sverigetopplistan)	30

2013 year-end chart performance for Until Now
Chart (2013)	Position
Belgian Albums (Ultratop Flanders)	151
Swedish Albums (Sverigetopplistan)	81
US Top Dance/Electronic Albums (Billboard)	10

2024 year-end chart performance for Until Now
Chart (2024)	Position
Australian Dance Albums (ARIA)	7

== Certifications ==
Certifications for Until Now
Region	Certification	Certified units/sales
Australia (ARIA)	Gold	35,000^{^}
New Zealand (RMNZ)	Gold	7,500^{‡}
Sweden (GLF)	Platinum	40,000^{‡}
United Kingdom (BPI)	Platinum	300,000^{*}
^{*} Sales figures based on certification alone.^{^} Shipments figures based on certification alone.^{‡} Sales+streaming figures based on certification alone.
