= Leave the World Behind (song) =

Song by Axwell, Ingrosso, Angello, Laidback Luke and Deborah Cox

Single by Axwell, Ingrosso, Angello and Laidback Luke featuring Deborah Cox

from the album Until One, Until Now, The Yearbook, and Axwell Presents Axtone Vol. 1
- Released: 1 April 2009
- Recorded: 2009
- Genre: Progressive house
- Length: 6:50 (original mix); 2:44 (radio edit)
- Label: Axtone
- Songwriters: Axwell; Sebastian Ingrosso; Steve Angello; Laidback Luke; Deborah Cox; Dina Schmidt

"Leave the World Behind" is a song by Swedish DJ/producers Axwell, Ingrosso and Angello (now known collectively as Swedish House Mafia) and Dutch-Filipino DJ/producer Laidback Luke. It features Canadian singer Deborah Cox.

== Track listings ==
Digital single
No.	Title	Length
1.	"Leave the World Behind"	2:44

Digital EP
No.	Title	Length
1.	"Leave the World Behind" (Radio Edit)	2:41
2.	"Leave the World Behind" (Original Mix)	6:50
3.	"Leave the World Behind" (Dirty South Remix)	8:27
4.	"Leave the World Behind" (Daddy's Groove Magic Island Rework)	7:07
5.	"Leave the World Behind" (Dabruck and Klein Remix)	8:17
6.	"Leave the World Behind" (Dimitri Vegas & Like Mike vs. SHM Dark Forest Edit)	6:33

== Chart performance ==
The song has climbed to number 39 on the Swedish Charts and it peaked at #40 on the US Dance chart.

=== Charts ===
Chart (2009)	Peak position
Belgium (Ultratop 50 Flanders)	14
Belgium (Ultratop 50 Wallonia)	23
Netherlands (Single Top 100)	75
Sweden (Sverigetopplistan)	39
US Hot Dance Club Songs (Billboard)	40
