= Numb (Usher song) =

Single by Usher

from the album Looking 4 Myself
- Released: August 21, 2012
- Recorded: 2012; Silent Sound Studios (Atlanta); Glenwood Place Studios (Burbank)
- Genre: Dance-pop; electropop
- Length: 3:46
- Label: RCA
- Songwriters: Alessandro Lindblad; Axel Hedfors; Klas Åhlund; Ryon Lovett; Sebastian Ingrosso; Steve Angello; Terry Lewis; Usher Raymond IV
- Producers: Swedish House Mafia; Alesso; Åhlund; Natural

Usher singles chronology
"Touch'N You" (2012)	"Numb" (2012)	"Dive" (2012)

Music video
- "Numb" on YouTube

"Numb" is a song recorded by American singer Usher for his seventh studio album Looking 4 Myself (2012). Usher co-wrote it with Ryon Lovett and Terry Lewis, with production and additional writing provided by Swedish House Mafia, Alesso, and Klas Åhlund. After their joint performance at the 2010 American Music Awards, Usher and Swedish House Mafia managed to start working on recording sessions for Usher's seventh studio album in Atlanta. RCA Records solicited "Numb" to contemporary hit radio stations on August 21, 2012 in the US as fourth single from the album.

"Numb" is a dance-pop and electropop song with house elements which contains revolutionary pop music influences. Lyrically, it is "an inspirational song about finding one’s destiny, and becoming numb to the negativity and just following your dreams". The song received generally positive acclaim from contemporary music critics with many of them praising its club-oriented production. "Numb" was a moderate worldwide success and reached the top-forty in five countries including Belgium, Germany and Australia.

American directors Chris Applebaum and Grace Harry shot the music video for "Numb"; it premiered October 11, 2012 on Usher's Vevo channel. It represents footage of Usher's life in the near past and features several dramatic scenes of him including taking care of his sons, standing towards a microphone unable to perform and lying together with a sick woman in a hospital. Critics were divided on the video; although some of them praised the choreography, others criticized Usher's emotions. The singer performed the song during his American Express show on June 11, 2012 in London and at the 2012 American Music Awards.

== Production and release ==
"It was a lot and they're three different DJs but when they come together, they are a production conglomerate. So tryna get them together at the same time, when I was in Atlanta, we made the most of our time and we cranked out two records"

— Usher talking about his collaboration with Swedish House Mafia.

Usher co-wrote "Numb" with Ryon Lovett and Terry Lewis, with production, complete instrumentation, and additional writing provided by EDM group Swedish House Mafia with Alesso and Klas Åhlund. Swedish House Mafia also produced one more song from Looking 4 Myself entitled "Euphoria". Speaking to The BoomBox, Usher explained that he had wanted to work with Swedish House Mafia ever since he performed with the group at the 2010 American Music Awards. The group agreed to work with Usher, saying they would attempt to make it to Atlanta to start "moving the ball forward". In an interview with MTV News, regarding the collaboration with Usher, Angello stated that they met Usher couple years ago and did the American Music Awards together before recruiting in Ibiza. He further elaborated that they were in Atlanta for five days working on a music for the then upcoming album. Angello commented that Usher is a great artist and as a trio they like to work with somebody who they respect, than to rather work with "just big name".

Mark "Exit" Goodchild recorded the song Silent Sound Studios in Atlanta and Glenwood Place Studios in Burbank, while Jorge Velasco, Kory Aaron and Randy Warnken served as recording assistants. It was mixed by Manny Marroquin at Larrabee Sound Studio, Universal City, with Chris Galland and Delbert Bowers serving as mixing assistants and Natural providing vocal production of "Numb". RCA Records released "Numb" to contemporary hit radio stations in the United States on August 21, 2012 as the fourth single from Looking 4 Myself. "Numb" was solicited to US rhythmic radio on August 28, 2012. It was also physically released as a CD single in Germany on October 26, 2012. Although it failed to reach the top 40, it appeared as the 13th track on Now That's What I Call Music! 44.

== Composition ==
"Numb" is a dance-pop and electropop song with R&B elements and contains revolutionary pop influences; it has a length of 3 minutes and 46 seconds. According to Lewis Corner of Digital Spy both "Euphoria" and "Numb" "include the DJs' glimmering synths while he [Usher] croons in his coolly-controlled falsetto." Jim Farber of The New York Daily News wrote that the songs which were produced by Swedish House Mafia propose a possible crossover point from electronica to R&B like Usher’s biggest hit "Yeah!" did from crunk to soul.

Lyrically, it is "an inspirational song about finding one’s destiny, and becoming numb to the negativity and just following your dreams". "Numb"'s lyrical message was described by Erika Ramirez of Billboard to simply be "Forget your troubles and fist-pump!". The single opens with the lines, "They say life is a battlefield / I say bring it on" and its chorus consists of "Just go numb / You never know until you let go". Ryan Hadfield of Consequence of Sound explained that Usher inadvertently describes the logic behind the musical ambition of Looking 4 Myself in "Numb", when he sings "Keep on doing the same old thing/Are you expecting change/Is that really insanity/Or just a loser’s game".

== Reception ==
=== Critical ===
DeeKay of SoulCulture commented that "even with the straightforward, hugely predictable electro-pop on the Swedish House Mafia-produced 'Numb' and 'Euphoria', Usher is operating at a level above his David Guetta and RedOne-loving peers." Meelz of ThisGoesIn concluded that "Numb" is a single quality track, "which we can see seeping through the radio in the latter half of 2012 – with the mantra of letting your problems go and dance." The Lantern's Alex Antonetz wrote that both "Numb" and "Euphoria" are future Charlie Bear fare. Trent Fitzgerald of PopCrush commented that the song is perfect for the clubs. Ryan Hadfield of Consequence of Sound labeled "Numb" together with "Can't Stop Won't Stop" and "Sins of My Father" as essential tracks on Looking 4 Myself. Andrew Unterberger of Popdust wrote that the single's production is appropriate for an Usher and Swedish House Mafia collaboration, though criticised its lack of originality. Despite this, Unterberger commended the song, writing "it does have the mind-numbing, body-activating effect the song is so explicitly searching for" and even though you can call it "an EDM cash-in [...] Usher was embracing club music way before most of his American pop star peers hopped on the bandwagon".

=== Commercial ===
Upon the release of Looking 4 Myself, due to digital downloads, "Numb" entered the singles chart in South Korea. It debuted on the South Korea Gaon International Chart at number 40 on June 10, 2012, with sales of 7,195 digital copies. In Australia, the song debuted and peaked at number 39 on November 4, 2012. "Numb" debuted at number 62 in Austria on November 2, 2012. After three weeks on the chart, it reached its peak of 18. The song was more successful in Belgium where reached a peak of two and 13 on Flanders Tip and Wallonia Tip chart respectively. On the week of September 17, 2012, the song debuted at number 31 on the US Pop Songs chart. It peaked at number 21 on the chart for the issue dated November 2, 2012. "Numb" debuted at number 97 on the US Billboard Hot 100 chart for the issue dated October 6, 2012. It eventually peaked at number 69 on the chart for the issue dated November 3, 2012. The single reached a peak of 41 on the Canadian Hot 100.

== Music video ==
An accompanying music video for "Numb" was shot by directors Chris Applebaum and Grace Harry, and edited by Jacquelyn London; all three reprised their roles for the video as they had previously worked together on Usher's video for "Dive" (2012). On October 9, 2012, a sneak peek of the video was posted on the singer's official Vevo channel on YouTube. Subsequently, via his official Twitter account, he tweeted: "Sometimes we take for granted moments that allow us to make it thru, ability to just wakeup every morning&take a breath", together with the link from the sneak peek. The sneak peek features Usher dancing in a glass box as different personal scenes including shots of his sons and footage from various concerts are projected towards the background. The full music video premiered on his Vevo channel October 11, 2012.

Usher lying together with a sick woman in a hospital in the video for "Numb"

The video begins with a footage of Usher walking offstage during a show part of his OMG Tour (2010—11), held at the O2 Arena, Berlin in January 2011. Subsequently, announcer explains, "He tried because he loves Berlin and he really wanted to give you guys a show, but he just couldn’t do it. Thanks for understanding." Usher then speaks with a remorse, "I felt like a failure, hopeless, paralyzed, numb." As the song starts Usher is seen chanting the lyrics while several sequence shots of him with his son and a sick woman in hospital are shown. The scenes are intercuted by Usher performing in a room full with bright white lights. Several other short scenes of Usher taking care of the sick woman, his son having a meal and Usher throwing money at strippers are shown. Several natural environments are projected onto a wall the singer stands in front off. As the song progresses, he enters in a glass box and starts dancing during the chorus. Scenes of Usher having toast with his friends, smoking a cigar and watching strippers performing lap-dance for him are shown. The singer is shown holding man's hand while he dies in a hospital. Then, he is seen unable to perform and cries in front of the microphone. The video ends with Usher managing to break the glass box.

Zara Golden of VH1 regarding the video commented that, although Usher had a lot of troubles in his life "he gives the kid a hug, enjoys a dance at the strip club (why not?) and sings out all the rest in a recording booth." Billboard's David Greenwald praised the choreography and noted that Usher shows no signs of sickness as he performs the compound choreography, "which ends with a forceful escape". Sam Lansky of Idolator was divided on the video and wrote that the singer "could have dug a little deeper to tap into some of that very real personal pain to bring something more emotionally charged to this video; as it stands, it’s a little too polished to feel anything but contrived."

The music video on YouTube has received over 20 million views as of May 2024.

== Live performances ==
Usher performed "Numb" for first time in a medley with "Euphoria" during his American Express Unstaged show on June 11, 2012 at London's Hammersmith Apollo. The show was directed by British director Hamish Hamilton. The singer performed the song at the 2012 American Music Awards in a medley with "Climax" and "Can't Stop Won't Stop".

== Track listing ==
- CD single
1. "Numb" (Album version)
2. "Numb" (Wideboys radio mix)
- Numb (UK Remixes)
1. "Numb" (Wideboys club mix) – 6:08
2. "Numb" (Wideboys dub) – 5:53
3. "Numb" (Wideboys radio mix) – 4:00
4. "Numb" (Jakwob remix) – 4:15
5. "Numb" (Mike Delinquent dub) – 4:23
6. "Numb" (Mike Delinquent remix) – 5:34

== Credits and personnel ==
Recording and mixing

- Recorded at Silent Sound Studios, Atlanta, Georgia; Glenwood Place Studios, Burbank, California; mixed at Larrabee Sound Studio, Universal City, California

Personnel

- Songwriting – Alessandro Lindblad, Axel Hedfors, Klas Åhlund, Ryon Lovett, Sebastian Ingrosso, Steve Angello, Terry Lewis, Usher Raymond IV
- Production – Lindblad, Åhlund, Axwell, Ingrosso, Angello
- Vocal production – Natural
- Mixing – Manny Marroquin
- Mixing assistants – Chris Galland, Delbert Bowers
- Recording – Mark "Exit" Goodchild
- Recording assistants – Jorge Velasco, Kory Aaron, Randy Warnken
- Instrumentation – Lindblad, Åhlund, Axwell, Ingrosso, Angello

Credits adapted from the liner notes of Looking 4 Myself, RCA Records.

== Charts and certifications ==
=== Weekly ===
Chart (2012–2013)	Peak position
Australia (ARIA)	39
Australia Urban (ARIA)	10
Austria (Ö3 Austria Top 40)	18
Belgium (Ultratip Bubbling Under Flanders)	2
Belgium Dance (Ultratop Flanders)	29
Belgium Urban (Ultratop Flanders)	13
Belgium (Ultratip Bubbling Under Wallonia)	13
Belgium Dance (Ultratop Wallonia)	20
Canada Hot 100 (Billboard)	41
Czech Republic Airplay (ČNS IFPI)	37
France (SNEP)	179
Germany (GfK)	24
Netherlands (Single Top 100)	61
Russia (Airplay)	156
Slovakia Airplay (ČNS IFPI)	60
South Korea International Chart (Gaon)	40
UK Hip Hop/R&B (Official Charts)	34
US Billboard Hot 100	69
US Hot Dance/Electronic Songs (Billboard)	13
US Hot Dance Club Songs (Billboard)	39
US Pop Airplay (Billboard)	21
US Rhythmic Airplay (Billboard)	24

=== Year-end ===
Chart (2013)	Position
Belgium Urban (Ultratop Flanders)	97

=== Certifications ===
Region	Certification	Certified units/sales
Australia (ARIA)	Gold	35,000^{‡}
Canada (Music Canada)	Gold	40,000^{‡}
^{‡} Sales+streaming figures based on certification alone.

== Release history ==
Country	Date	Format	Label
United States	August 21, 2012	Contemporary hit radio	RCA Records
United States	August 28, 2012	Rhythmic radio	RCA Records
Germany	October 26, 2012	CD single	RCA Records
Ireland	November 4, 2012	Digital remixes	RCA Records
United Kingdom	November 11, 2012	Digital remixes	RCA Records
