= Lemme See =

Single by Usher featuring Rick Ross

from the album Looking 4 Myself
- Released: May 4, 2012
- Recorded: 2012
- Studio: Parkland Playhouse (Parkland); Silent Sound (Atlanta)
- Genre: R&B; hip hop
- Length: 4:15
- Label: RCA
- Songwriters: Usher Raymond IV; William Roberts; Eric Bellinger; James Scheffer; Danny Morris; Nickolas Marzouca; Lundon Knighten
- Producers: Jim Jonsin; Mr. Morris; Natural

Usher singles chronology
"Scream" (2012)	"Lemme See" (2012)	"Touch'N You" (2012)

Rick Ross singles chronology
"Stay Schemin'" (2012)	"Lemme See" (2012)	"Born Stunna" (2012)

Music video
- "Lemme See" on YouTube

"Lemme See" is a song by American singer-songwriter Usher, released through RCA Records, as the third single from his seventh studio album Looking 4 Myself (2012). The track features vocals from rapper Rick Ross. It was written by Usher, Eric Bellinger, Jim Jonsin, Danny Morris, Nickolas Marzouca and Lundon Knighten with its production helmed by Jonsin and Morris. It was digitally released on May 4, 2012 and sent to urban radio on May 8, 2012. "Lemme See" is a mid-tempo R&B song that makes heavy use of synthesizers. Its lyrics depict Usher contemplating on what he is going to do when he "gets a certain female clubgoer into his bedroom".

The song peaked at number 46 on the Billboard Hot 100. It has also reached number two on the Hot R&B/Hip-Hop Songs chart, the second single from Looking 4 Myself to peak in the top three on the chart, following its lead single "Climax". Internationally "Lemme See" reached number six on the South Korea Gaon International Chart, number 88 on the French Singles Chart and number ninety on the UK Singles Chart. The song's music video was directed by Philip Andelman, and shows Usher inside his estate with his love interest in several risqué scenes. Usher performed the song live during the 2012 iTunes Festival.

== Release and composition ==
"Lemme See"
"Lemme See" is a mid-tempo R&B song, that contains elements of hip hop.

"Lemme See" was digitally released on May 4, 2012 as the third single from Usher's seventh studio album Looking 4 Myself, following "Scream". The following week, on May 8, 2012 "Lemme See" was released to SoundCloud. On the same day, it was sent to urban radio and on May 22, to rhythmic radio.

"Lemme See" is a mid-tempo R&B song that heavily incorporates synthesizers, and has a running duration of four minutes and 15 seconds. It contains elements of hip hop music, and its production was compared to the one in Kelly Rowland's "Motivation" (2011). Lyrically, Usher is contemplating on what he is going to do when he "gets a certain female clubgoer into his bedroom", in the line: Hey girl, I'm debating if I should take you home. During the pre-chorus, he comes to the conclusion: I decided to take my shirt off / and show my chest.

== Critical reception ==
The Observer's Killian Fox called the song a hit. Andy Kellman of AllMusic described the track as "a slithering, low-slung jam" noting it as one of Usher's best songs and a stand-out from Looking 4 Myself. DJ Booth commended its production, writing that it contains "sultry, slow-burning synth grooves". Erika Ramirez of Billboard also praised the song's production, calling it "seductive" while showing a positive response to Rick Ross' verse. Several other reviewers showed similar responses to Ross' appearance on "Lemme See", including Sobhi Youssef of Sputnikmusic who noted it as a "welcome" surprise. The Los Angeles Times's Randall Roberts wrote that the song "finds its groove when Rick Ross parks his Lamborghini on the track’s lawn for a cameo". By contrast, BBC Music's Natalie Shaw disapproved of Rick Ross' verse, saying that it consists of "tasteless mentions of Trayvon Martin".

== Chart performance ==
Due to digital downloads, "Lemme See" entered the singles chart in South Korea. It debuted on the South Korea Gaon International Chart at number ten on May 27, 2012, with sales of 17,445 digital copies. The following week, it rose to number six, selling a further 19,632 copies. In its third week, with the release of Looking 4 Myself in South Korea, it sold 10,914 units and was charted at number 18. In its fourth week, "Lemme See" dropped 23 positions to number 41, with 5,493 digital copies sold. It was knocked off the chart the proceeding week. In the US, "Lemme See" peaked below the top 40 on the Billboard Hot 100, peaking at number 46. The song peaked at number two on the Hot R&B/Hip-Hop Songs chart, and remained in the top five for eleven weeks. In the UK, following the release of Looking 4 Myself, the song entered and peaked at number ninety on the week of June 23, 2012. It also reached number 21 on the UK R&B chart. In France, the song entered and peaked at number 88, while dropping to number 110 the following the week before dropping off the chart in its third week.

== Music video and live performances ==
Usher and his love interest making love in a risqué scene

The official music video for "Lemme See" was released on June 14, 2012, and was directed by Philip Andelman. The video opens with a close-up of Usher's estate, and a woman bound by ropes. Usher is stood by a swimming pool singing the first verse, with the pool reflecting on him. During the pre-chorus, Usher is leaning against a wall while pulling up his top to reveal his chest. Entering the chorus, the video intercuts to Usher preparing drinks for himself and the tied up woman– his love interest. With the second verse, Usher is admiring his still tied up love interest. In the second pre-chorus, leaned against a wall Usher removes his shirt, while the video intercuts to him approaching his love interest to have sex. Entering Rick Ross' verse, Ross is sat down shirtless, accompanied by two women sat by him left and right. Touching Ross' back, their tattoos transfer on to Ross and bloom. Him and Usher are both by a pool with Ross performing his rap, while in an intercut scene Usher's love interest is being released from her tied up predicament. In the final chorus, Usher and his love interest have sex in a risqué scene, with both their tattoos moving and blooming on to each other in a similar way to Ross' scene. This alternates with the latter scene, Usher leaned against the wall and him and Ross by the pool, with Usher singing the verse. The video ends with Ross and Usher echoing the song's title.

American magazine Rap-Up praised the music video, calling it "seductive" while Billboard's David Greenwald compared it to Barbadian singer Rihanna's "S&M", and noted parts of "Lemme See"'s video as "less edgy" compared to its love scene. Opening the 2012 iTunes Festival, Usher performed the song for the first time along with "Can't Stop Won't Stop", "Twisted", "Dive" and "Numb" and other songs.

The music video on YouTube has received over 80 million views as of May 2024.

== Credits and personnel ==
Recording

- Vocal recording – Parkland Playhouse, Parkland, FL; Silent Sound Studios, Atlanta, GA
- Mixing – Parkland Playhouse, Parkland, FL

Personnel

- Songwriting – Jim Jonsin, Daniel Morris, Nickolas Marzouca, Usher Raymond IV, Eric Bellinger, Lundon
- Production – Jim Jonsin, Mr. Morris
- Vocal production – Natural
- Keyboard and programming – Jim Jonsin, Danny Morris
- Recording – Nickolas Marzouca, Mark "Exit" Goodchild
- Recording assistants – Matt Huber, Nathan Burgess, Kory Aaron
- Mixing – Robert Marks
- Mixing assistants – Matt Huber, Nathan Burgess, Dana Richard
- Additional vocals – Rick Ross

Credits adapted from the liner notes of Looking 4 Myself, RCA Records.

== Charts ==
=== Weekly charts ===
Chart (2012)	Peak position
France (SNEP)	88
South Korea Gaon International Chart	6
UK Singles (Official Charts Company)	90
UK Hip Hop/R&B (Official Charts)	21
US Billboard Hot 100	46
US Hot R&B/Hip-Hop Songs (Billboard)	2
US Rhythmic Airplay (Billboard)	11

=== Year-end charts ===
Chart (2012)	position
US Hot R&B/Hip-Hop Songs (Billboard)	14
US Rhythmic (Billboard)	49

== Release history ==
Country	Date	Format	Label	Ref.
United Kingdom	May 4, 2012	Digital download	RCA Records	
United States	May 8, 2012	Urban radio	RCA Records	
United States	May 22, 2012	Rhythmic radio	RCA Records	
