= American Music Awards of 2012 =

Music awards ceremony

40th Annual American Music Awards
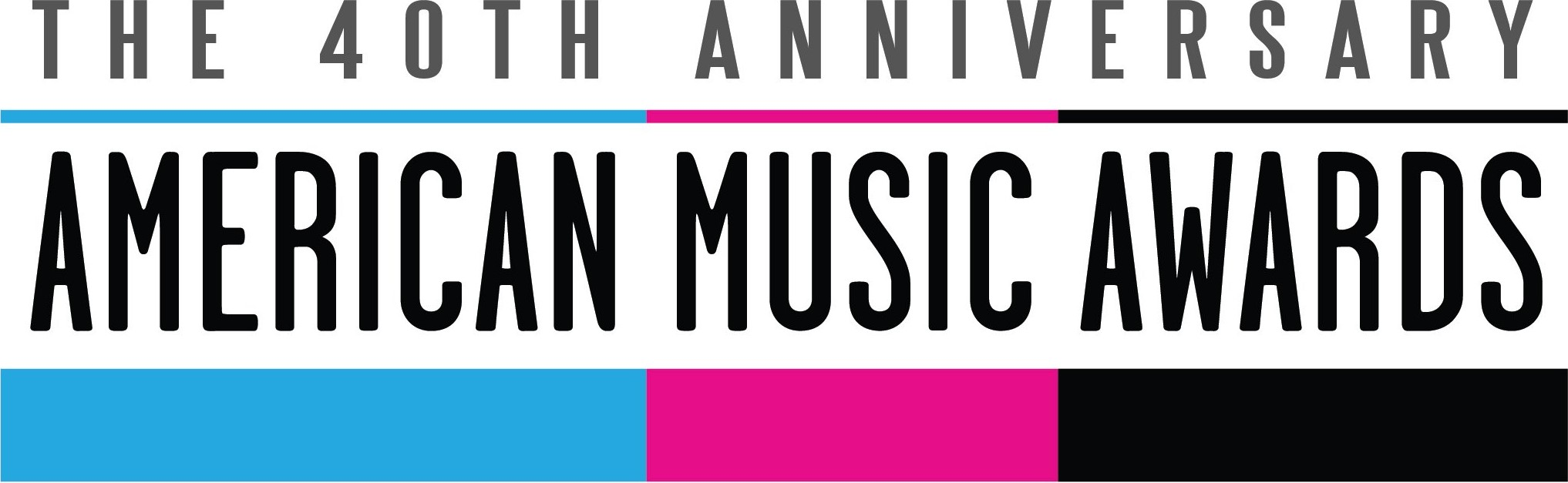
- American Music Awards of 2012 logo
- Date: November 18, 2012
- Location: Nokia Theatre L.A. Live, Los Angeles, California
- Country: United States

Highlights
- Most awards: Justin Bieber (3)
- Most nominations: Rihanna and Nicki Minaj (4 each)
- Website: ABC-American Music Award

Television/radio coverage
- Network: ABC; Global TV
- Runtime: 128 minutes
- Viewership: 9.47 million
- Produced by: Dick Clark Productions

The 40th Annual American Music Awards was held on November 18, 2012 at the Nokia Theatre L.A. Live in Los Angeles. The awards recognized the most popular artists and albums from the year 2012. It was broadcast live on ABC. The nominees were announced on October 9, 2012 by Christina Aguilera. This year included a brand new category, Electronic Dance Music. Justin Bieber won all three of his nominations, and of each of their four nominations, Nicki Minaj won two, and Rihanna one. Katy Perry won one of her 2 nominations, whereas Adele and Taylor Swift each won the award for which they were nominated.

== Performers ==
Artist(s)	Song(s)	Ref
Usher	"Numb" "Climax" "Can't Stop Won't Stop"	
Carly Rae Jepsen	"This Kiss" "Call Me Maybe"	
The Wanted	"I Found You"	
Kelly Clarkson	"Miss Independent" "Since U Been Gone" "Stronger (What Doesn't Kill You)" "Catch My Breath"	
Kesha	"Die Young"	
No Doubt	"Looking Hot"	
Taylor Swift	"I Knew You Were Trouble"	
Linkin Park	"Burn It Down"	
Nicki Minaj	"Freedom"	
P!nk	"Try"	
Justin Bieber; Nicki Minaj	"As Long As You Love Me" "Beauty and a Beat"	
Christina Aguilera	"Lotus Intro" "Army of Me" "Let There Be Love"	
Pitbull; Christina Aguilera	"Don't Stop the Party" "Feel This Moment"	
Carrie Underwood	"Two Black Cadillacs"	
Swizz Beatz; Chris Brown; Ludacris	"Everyday Birthday"	
Stevie Wonder	Tribute to Dick Clark: "Master Blaster (Jammin')" "My Cherie Amour" "Sir Duke"	
Psy; MC Hammer	"Gangnam Style" "2 Legit 2 Quit"	

== Presenters ==
- Ryan Seacrest - presented Favorite Pop Rock Male Artist
- Eric Stonestreet - presented Favorite Country Female Artist
- Lucy Hale & Phillip Phillips - introduced Carly Rae Jepsen
- Randy Jackson - introduced Kelly Clarkson
- Stacy Keibler & Ne-Yo - presented Favorite Rap/Hip-Hop Album
- Cyndi Lauper - introduced Kesha
- Karmin - introduced No Doubt
- Kerry Washington & Apolo Ohno - Favorite Alternative Artist
- Florida Georgia Line - introduced Taylor Swift
- Jennifer Morrison & Ginnifer Goodwin - presented Favorite Soul/R&B Male Artist
- Lady Antebellum - presented Favorite Country Male Artist
- Heidi Klum - introduced P!nk
- Backstreet Boys - presented Old Navy New Artist of the Year
- Colbie Caillat & Gavin DeGraw - presented Favorite Country Band/Duo/Group
- Carly Rae Jepsen - introduced Justin Bieber & Nicki Minaj
- Kelly Rowland & Elisha Cuthbert - presented Favorite Electronic/Dance Music Artist
- Gloria Estefan - introduced Christina Aguilera
- Luke Bryan & Jenny McCarthy - presented Favorite Pop/Rock Album & introduced Carrie Underwood
- Brandy - paid tribute to Whitney Houston & introduced Swizz Beatz, Chris Brown & Ludacris
- Hayden Panettiere & 50 Cent - presented Favorite Rap/Hip-Hop Artist
- Ryan Seacrest - paid tribute to Dick Clark & introduced Stevie Wonder
- Neon Trees - presented Favorite Country Album
- will.i.am - presented Artist of the Year & introduced Psy & MC Hammer

== Winners and nominees ==
Artist of the Year	Old Navy New Artist of the Year
Justin Bieber; Drake; Maroon 5; Katy Perry; Rihanna	Carly Rae Jepsen; J. Cole; fun.; Gotye; One Direction
Favorite Pop/Rock Male Artist	Favorite Pop/Rock Female Artist
Justin Bieber; Flo Rida; Pitbull; Usher	Katy Perry; Kelly Clarkson; Nicki Minaj; Rihanna
Favorite Pop/Rock Band/Duo/Group	Favorite Pop/Rock Album
Maroon 5; fun.; One Direction; The Wanted	Believe – Justin Bieber; Overexposed – Maroon 5; Pink Friday: Roman Reloaded – Nicki Minaj; Up All Night – One Direction
Favorite Country Male Artist	Favorite Country Female Artist
Luke Bryan; Jason Aldean; Eric Church	Taylor Swift; Miranda Lambert; Carrie Underwood
Favorite Country Band/Duo/Group	Favorite Country Album
Lady Antebellum; Rascal Flatts; Zac Brown Band	Blown Away – Carrie Underwood; Tailgates & Tanlines – Luke Bryan; Tuskegee – Lionel Richie
Favorite Rap/Hip-Hop Artist	Favorite Rap/Hip-Hop Album
Nicki Minaj; Drake; Tyga	Pink Friday: Roman Reloaded – Nicki Minaj; Cole World: The Sideline Story – J. Cole; Take Care – Drake
Favorite Soul/R&B Male Artist	Favorite Soul/R&B Female Artist
Usher; Chris Brown; Trey Songz	Beyoncé; Mary J. Blige; Rihanna
Favorite Soul/R&B Album	Favorite Alternative Artist
Talk That Talk – Rihanna; Fortune – Chris Brown; Looking 4 Myself – Usher	Linkin Park; The Black Keys; Gotye
Favorite Adult Contemporary Artist	Favorite Latin Artist
Adele; Kelly Clarkson; Train	Shakira; Don Omar; Pitbull
Favorite Contemporary Inspirational Artist	Favorite Electronic Dance Music Artist
tobyMac; Jeremy Camp; Newsboys	David Guetta; Calvin Harris; Skrillex
