= Sins of My Father (song) =

Song performed by Usher

Song by Usher

from the album Looking 4 Myself
- Recorded: 2012; Jungle City Studios (New York City); Doppler Studios (Atlanta); Glenwood Place Studios (Burbank); Instrument Zoo (Miami)
- Genre: Soul
- Length: 3:56
- Label: RCA
- Songwriters: Salaam Remi; Rico Love; Usher Raymond IV; Terry Lewis
- Producers: Remi; Love (co-prod.)

"Sins of My Father" is a song recorded by American recording artist Usher for his seventh studio album Looking 4 Myself (2012). The song, a collaborative effort between Usher, Terry Lewis, Salaam Remi, and Rico Love, tells the story of a "tortured soul" in a "volatile" relationship." Critics noted Usher's relationship with ex-wife Tameka Foster to be the basis of the song, which contains references to their children together. Usher himself added that the song itself is a "kind of testament" for the type of father he is.

"Sins of My Father" is a soul song that contains prominent blues, dub, Motown and reggae influences. It received universal acclaim from music critics, who cited it as a stand-out track on Looking 4 Myself. Upon the release of Looking 4 Myself, the song debuted at number 62 on the South Korea Gaon International Chart, with sales of 5,813 digital copies.

== Writing and recording ==
"But I’m adding to the statistic that there are fathers out there who are there for their children, who are there to raise them, who understand that they have to take that time and really make sure that they make that connection. And understand that these kids are future adults – they’re not kids – so if you don’t give them the time and attention they need now, then they’ll be running around and somebody else will be knocking them upside the head or they’ll be incarcerated."

— Usher talking about the inspiration of "Sins of My Father".

"Sins of My Father" was written by Usher, Rico Love, Salaam Remi and Terry Lewis. The production of the song was helmed by Remi, with Love also serving as its co-producer. Remi has previously produced songs such as "Made You Look" (God's Son, 2002) for American rapper Nas and "You Know I'm No Good" (Back to Black, 2006) for late English singer Amy Winehouse.

In an interview with SoulCulture, Usher told that the inspiration for writing "Sins of My Father" is about dealing with things that people can't understand. He further stated that the past can bring people "down a road" because they are not aware of it. According to him, "The time spent with a father will teach you a certain understanding of live and how to cope and deal with things. The lack of a father being there can also teach you how to deal with life – and that’s what 'Sins Of The Father' is about ... That statement was made because that’s something that I felt." Usher added that the song itself is a "kind of testament" for the father he is.

Gleyder "Gee" Disla and Mark "Exit" Goodchild recorded "Sins of My Father" at Jungle City Studios in New York City, Doppler Studios in Atlanta, Glenwood Place Studios in Burbank and Instrument Zoo in Miami. Alex Fremin, Jacob Dennis, Max Unruh and Ramon Rivas served as recording assistants. It was mixed by Manny Marroquin at Larrabee Sound Studio in Universal City, while Chris Galland and Delbert Bowers served as a mixing assistant. The track's producer Remi together with Vincent Henry and Czech Film Orchestra, provided the "Sins of My Father" instrumentation.

== Composition and lyrical interpretation ==
"Sins of My Father"
A sample of "Sins of My Father" which uses bass, keyboards, guitar, drums, horns, saxophone and strings which are played by the Czech Film Orchestra.

"Sins of My Father" is a soul song with prominent blues, dub, Motown and reggae influences that runs for three minutes and 56 seconds. The song's instrumentation consists of bass, keyboards, guitar, drums, horns, saxophone and strings which are played by the Czech Film Orchestra. According to Jim Farber of Daily News, "Sins of My Father" consists of "some of the sexy, retro shading" that can be seen in the Remi produced songs by Amy Winehouse. Popdust's Andrew Unterberger commented that the track "sounds like a death rattle, a hypnotically low bass line slinking around some ominously shook maracas, a molasses-slow drum loop, and by the end, even some John Barry-cinematic-style strings." He further stated that "Sins of My Father" is a step "bluesier and evil-er, sounding more from the legacy of Howlin’ Wolf and Screamin’ Jay Hawkins—not quite as guttural, but Ush[er] still uses all the tools at his disposal, even breaking out the fake voodoo accent, and more than gets the point across."

Lyrically, "Sins of My Father" dramatic narrative has been compared to Michael Jackson's Billie Jean (1983). The song begins with Usher gasping "My sons, Keep them ... please forgive me." Unterberger of Popdust concluded that the track gets more intense, as Usher sings in the song's opening verse: "I think this woman went and put a hex on me / Oh now, why’d I let her go and put that sex on me?". The pre-chorus features Usher yelping in falsetto: "But she didn’t make me pay for it with my money! / OWWWW!!!". According to Erika Ramirez of Billboard magazine, "Usher soulfully pays for his father's promiscuous ways over melodic soundcapes".

== Critical reception ==
"Sins of My Father" received universal acclaim from music critics. Nathan S. of DJBooth called the "openly autobiographical" song the most affecting track he has "done in years". He concluded by stating: "I can't think of any other artist of Usher's status who would tie his cheating ways to an absent father, and for that he deserves some applause". Eric Arredondo of Beats Per Minute stated that in "Sins of My Father", Usher shows "more bite in his voice" than he has ever heard before, and that "it helps to make a song that is both fun and slightly sinister". Natalie Shaw of BBC Music called "Sins of My Father" outstanding, commenting that Usher's "slink here sounds sinister, for the first time, fearing he'll fall under a demon woman's deathly voodoo while slack, deep beats play out".

Rap-Up labelled "Sins of My Father" as one of their favorite songs on the album, alongside "Climax", "Lemme See" and "Twisted". Ryan Hadfield of Consequence of Sound labelled "Sins of My Father" as an "essential track" of Looking 4 Myself and stated that, alongside "What Happened to U", the song displays the same "vocal prowess" as the rest of the album, but is matched with "beats of higher sophistication which avers his earnest attempt to deviate from a traditional blend of R&B and hip-hop". According to Verse of SoulCulture "'Sins Of My Father', with its reggae vibe meets Marvin Gaye or Curtis Mayfield sensibilities addressing family issues this is the sort of track we need to hear more of from our artists."

== Credits and personnel ==
Recording and mixing

- Recorded at Jungle City Studios, New York City; Doppler Studios, Atlanta, Georgia; Glenwood Place Studios, Burbank, California; Instrument Zoo, Miami, Florida; mixed at Larrabee Sound Studio, Universal City, California

Personnel

- Songwriting – Rico Love, Salaam Remi, Terry Lewis, Usher Raymond IV
- Production – Salaam Remi
- Co-producer – Rico Love
- Mixing – Manny Marroquin
- Mixing assistants – Chris Galland, Delbert Bowers
- Recording – Gleyder "Gee" Disla, Mark "Exit" Goodchild
- Recording assistants – Alex Fremin, Jacob Dennis, Max Unruh, Ramon Rivas
- Bass, keyboards, guitar, drums – Salaam Remi
- Saxophone – Vincent Henry
- Strings – Czech Film Orchestra

Credits adapted from the liner notes of Looking 4 Myself, RCA Records.

== Charts ==
Upon the release of Looking 4 Myself, due to digital downloads, "Sins of My Father" charted in lower regions on the singles chart in South Korea. It debuted on the South Korea Gaon International Chart at number 62 on June 10, 2012, with sales of 5,813 digital copies.

Chart (2012)	Peak position
South Korea Gaon International Chart	62
