= La Yegros =

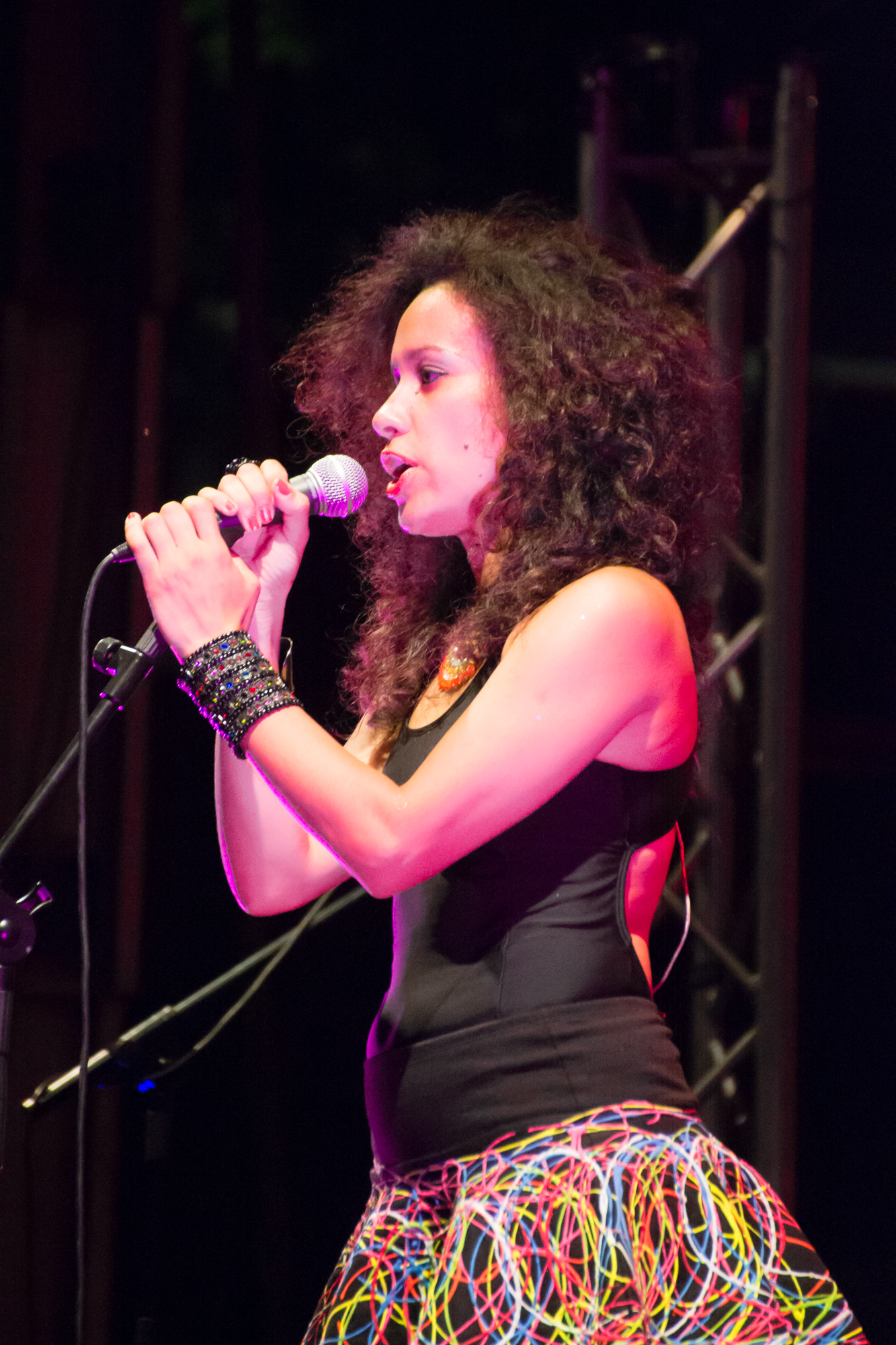
- La Yegros 2014 in Detmold

Background information
- Born: Mariana Alejandra Yegros; Morón, Buenos Aires, Argentina
- Genres: Latin, Electro, Folklore, Worldbeat
- Occupation: singer-songwriter
- Years active: 2009–present
- Label: Canta La Selva
- Website: Official website

Mariana Alejandra Yegros, better known by her stage name La Yegros, is an Argentinian singer-songwriter.

== Early life ==
Mariana Yegros was born in Morón, Buenos Aires Province. Daughter of Aníbal Yegros and Pily Jara, she discovered her passion in music while being very young. Her parents are originally from Misiones Province.

Her influences come from her family origins. Her father listened to chamamé, which is traditional folk music from the north of Argentina, and her mother listened to cumbia. Later in life she explored music from India and Africa which inspired her to mix music styles.

After finishing high school, she joined the Conservatory of Music of Morón in Buenos Aires to study opera singing.

== Career start ==
A few years after joining her studies, she joined an alternative group called De La Guarda. There were two music directors, one of whom was King Coya (Argentinean electro-cumbia producer). That opened the way for her to start performing in public, to sing in front of thousands of people.

== Solo career ==
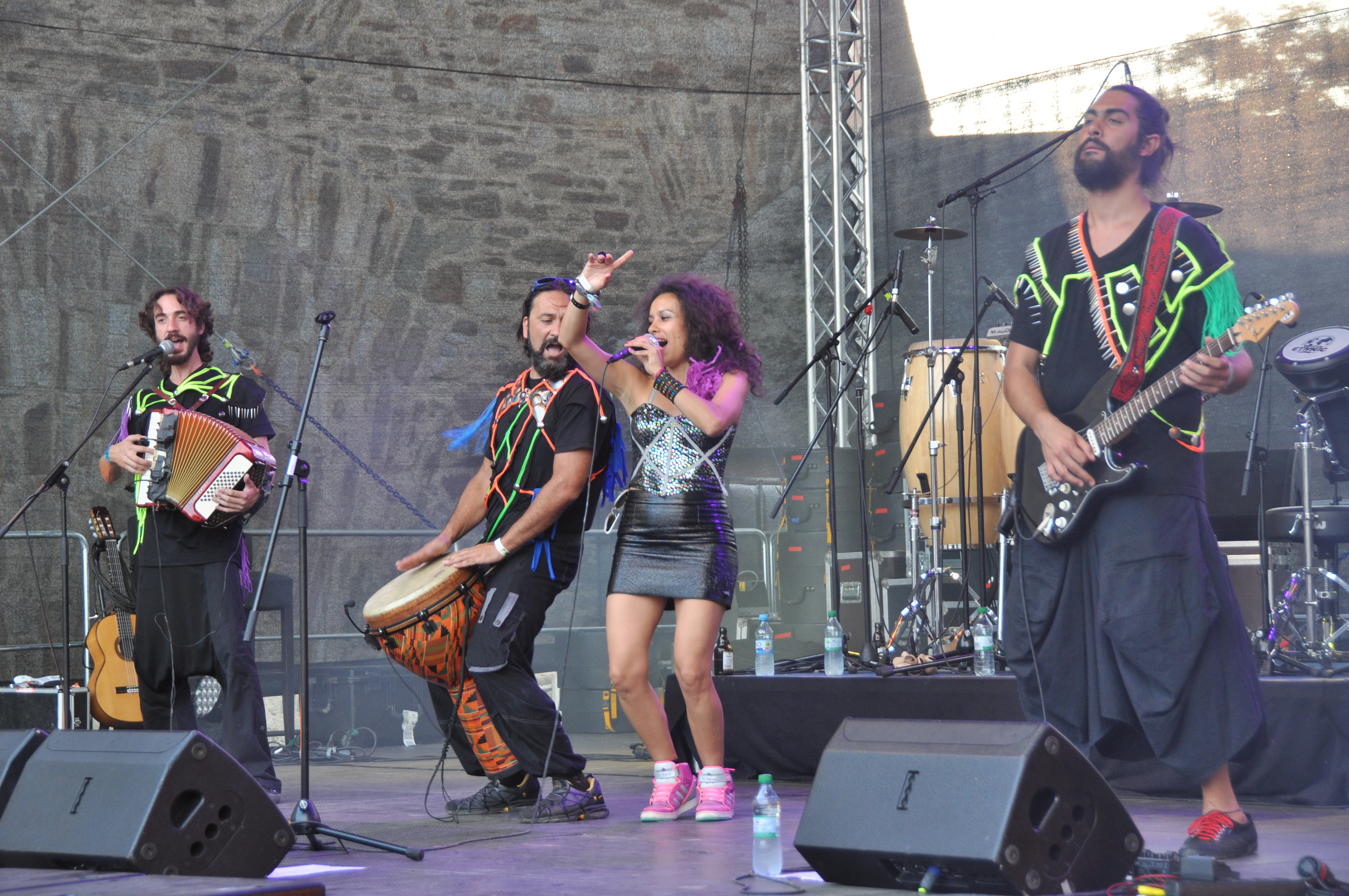
La Yegros at the Horizonte world music festival 2014 at the Ehrenbreitstein Fortress in Koblenz

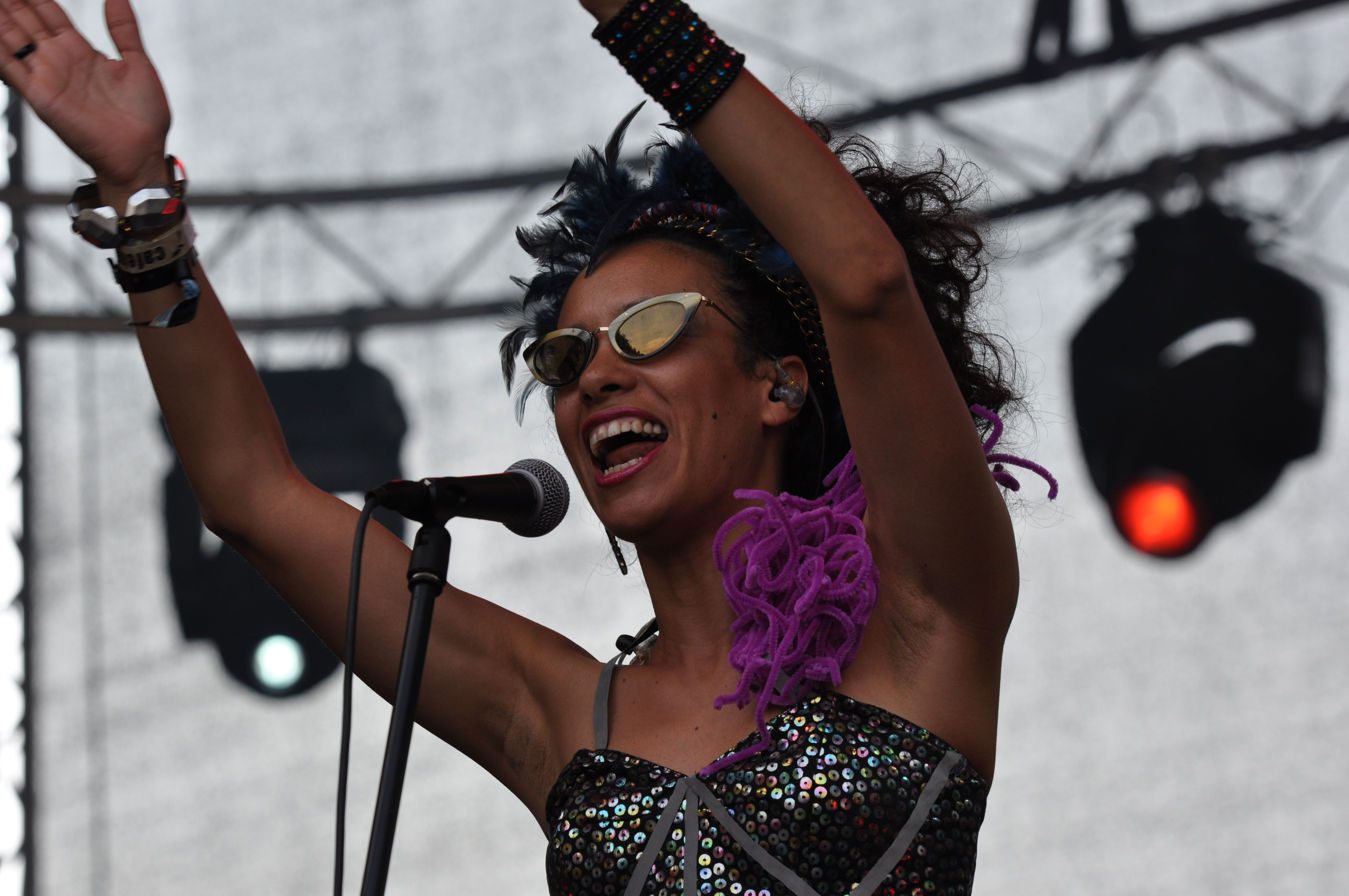
La Yegros at the Horizonte world music festival 2014 at the Ehrenbreitstein Fortress in Koblenz

Her debut album Viene de Mi was released on 17 June 2013 on ZZK/Waxploitation Records. Gustavo Santaolalla, Gaby Kerpel, Gato Muñoz and Miss Bolivia are collaborators of this album. It mixes electronic music with traditional Latin American rhythms like cumbia, chamamé, carnavalito and milonga.

Singles of this album are "Viene de mí" and "Trocitos de madera".

Media platform Sounds and Colors named it "one of the best albums of 2013".

Her song "El Bendito" was featured in the football video game 2014 FIFA World Cup Brazil.

In 2015 she released Magnetismo, through Soundway Records. The album is a mix of influences: to chamamé melodies to cumbia and EDM. In addition, explorations into North and West African folk music – from Rai to Malian blues – hip-hop, rock, tropical pop, reggae, and dancehall are woven in. The record has many collaborations, including Gustavo Santaolalla, Gaby Kerpel, Javier Casalla, Puerto Candelaria and Sabina Sciubba.

“Chicha Roja" is the official single of this record, which has over 6 million views on YouTube.

In 2019 she released the album Suelta, through her own records label Canta La Selva records, produced by Gaby Kerpel with the luxurious collaboration of Eduardo Cabra (also known as Visitante and part of Calle 13) and Jori Collignon (member of the tropical bass band Skip & Die). Soom T. Appears as a guest singer on "Tenemos Voz"

Singles of this album are "Alegría", "Sube La Presión" y "Linda La Cumbia" and "Tenemos Voz".

== Discography ==
=== Albums ===
Year	Album	Peak positions	
Year	Album	FR	BEL (Wa)
2013	Viene de Mi	126	135
2016	Magnetismo	-	-
2019	Suelta	-	-

=== Singles ===
Year	Single	Peak positions	Album
Year	Single	FR	Album
2013	"Viene de Mi"	168	Viene de Mi
2018	"Sube La Presión"	–	Suelta
2019	"Linda la Cumbia"	–	Suelta
