= Dive (Usher song) =

Single by Usher

from the album Looking 4 Myself
- Released: August 28, 2012
- Recorded: 2012
- Studio: Parkland Playhouse (Parkland, FL); Circlehouse Studios (Miami, FL)
- Genre: R&B
- Length: 3:47
- Label: RCA
- Songwriters: Rico Love; James Scheffer; Danny Morris; Frank Romano
- Producers: Jim Jonsin; Love; Romano; Morris

Usher singles chronology
"Numb" (2012)	"Dive" (2012)	"Rest of My Life" (2012)

Music video
- "Dive" on YouTube

"Dive" is a song recorded by the American recording artist Usher for his seventh studio album, Looking 4 Myself (2012). It was written and produced by Rico Love, Jim Jonsin, Danny Morris and Frank Romano. "Dive" is a slow-paced R&B ballad with elements of pop music, with Usher making use of his falsetto range. Its lyrics use the metaphor of diving, which was interpreted by critics to discuss a commitment to a relationship. The song was announced by Usher on Twitter as the fifth single from Looking 4 Myself on August 21, 2012. It was released to urban radio on August 28, 2012.

An accompanying music video directed by Chris Applebaum, portrays Victoria's Secret Angel model Chanel Iman as Usher's love interest, showing them being intimate and having sex in several scenes. The song debuted at number 50 on the South Korea Gaon International Chart, with sales of 6,546 digital copies. "Dive" peaked at number 34 on the US Hot R&B/Hip-Hop Songs, remaining on the chart for twelve weeks before dropping out.

== Composition and lyrics ==
"Dive"
"Dive" is a slow-paced R&B ballad with elements of pop music. Its lyrics use the metaphor of diving to discuss a commitment to a relationship.

The track is a slow-paced R&B ballad with elements of pop music that runs for a length of three minutes and 47 seconds. Throughout the song, Usher makes use of his falsetto range, to which Billboard's Erika Ramirez described as "soulful". Chuck Arnold of People complimented Usher's falsetto on both "Dive" and lead single "Climax", adding that the songs show"that he's a "better singer than ever". Matt Cibula of PopMatters wrote that "Dive" contains a triple entendre in its lyrics: seemingly singing about diving or oral sex, "only to realize that what he's really discussing" is commitment to a relationship. Trent Fitzgerald of PopCrush perceived that the song's lyrics "metaphorically compares love to the crashing waters of the ocean". Carrie Battan of Pitchfork interpreted the lyrics as "explicit" which might "make you cringe if they'd come from of anyone else" in the line: "It's raining inside your bed/ No parts are dry/ Lovin' made you so wet/ Your Legs/ Your thighs".

== Critical reception ==
DJ Booth described its production as "sultry" and noted the song as a potential hit for Usher. Erika Ramirez of Billboard also saw the song as a success, writing that it is "slower and more sensual" than Jim Jonsin and Rico Love's "Motivation" (2011) performed by Kelly Rowland. Ramirez also praised Usher's vocals, more specifically his falsetto, the reasoning to why "we fell in love with the singer to begin with". Complex's Brad Wete perceived the song as a "sexy slow-winding cut", that is "powered by Usher’s falsetto". Ryan Hadfield of Consequence of Sound also praised Usher's vocals, with "Dive" and lead single "Climax" showing his "superior R&B vocal range". Pitchfork's Carry Battan wrote that Usher's "vocal mastery" allows him to turn the chorus of "Dive"—which she viewed as "cornball"—into something "more specific, as if he were addressing just one woman [...]". PopMatters' Matt Cibula saw the lyric's as "clever" for incorporating a triple-entendre. Cibula further lauded Usher's falsetto, which he wrote Usher sings in an "urgent" whisper.

== Music video ==
The music video for "Dive" was filmed in July 2012, directed by Chris Applebaum, and released to VEVO on August 25, 2012. In the video, Victoria's Secret Angel model Chanel Iman plays as Usher's love interest. Set on a luxury yacht in the open sea, the video begins with Usher talking, before showing him singing the first verse. The video intercuts to Iman and Usher inside a cabin with water gushing in. For the chorus, they are being intimate, with water further entering the singer's cabin. They are again being intimate for the second verse, sitting outside the yacht, with water now level with Usher's waist inside the cabin, entering the second chorus, where Usher and Iman make love. During the bridge, both are romancing within the cabin's bathroom, with the video intercutting to different romantic scenarios. Further scenarios are shown in the final chorus, with the water now fully submerging the cabin and Usher. The video closes with Usher swimming to safety, but before reaching the surface, he and Iman approach each other, embracing in the water.

== Live performances ==
Opening the 2012 iTunes Festival, Usher performed "Dive" for the first time with "Can't Stop Won't Stop", "Twisted", "Numb" and other songs.

== Credits and personnel ==
Recording

- Vocal recording – Parkland Playhouse, Parkland, Florida; Circlehouse Studios, Miami, Florida
- Mixing – Parkland Playhouse, Parkland, Florida

Personnel

- Songwriting – Rico Love, Jim Jonsin, Danny Morris, Frank Romano
- Production – Rico Love, Jim Jonsin, Mr. Morris, Frank Romano
- Keyboard and programming – Jim Jonsin, Danny Morris
- Guitar – Frank Romano
- Recording – Mark "Exit" Goodchild, Nikolas Marzouca
- Recording assistants – Matt Huber, Nathan Burgess, Diego Avendano
- Additional recording – Matt Huber
- Mixing – Robert Marks
- Mixing assistants – Matt Huber, Nathan Burgess, Dana Richard

Credits adapted from the liner notes of Looking 4 Myself, RCA Records.

== Charts ==
Because of digital downloads, "Dive" entered the singles chart in South Korea. It debuted on the South Korea Gaon International Chart at number 50 on June 10, 2012, with sales of 6,546 digital copies. It debuted at number eight on the US Bubbling Under Hot R&B/Hip-Hop Singles chart for the chart issue dated September 8, 2012. On the US Hot R&B/Hip-Hop Songs chart, "Dive" peaked at number 34, remaining on the chart for twelve weeks.

Chart (2012)	Peak position
South Korea International Chart (Gaon)	50
US Hot R&B/Hip-Hop Songs (Billboard)	34

== Release history ==
Country	Date	Format	Label	Ref.
United States	August 28, 2012	Urban radio	RCA Records	
