= Danny Morris (music producer) =

American songwriter and music producer

Mr. Morris
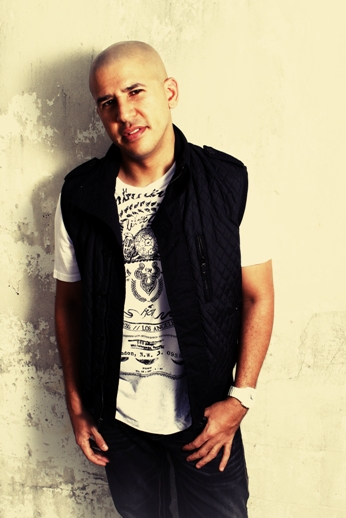

Background information
- Also known as: Mr. Morris
- Origin: Jamaica / Miami
- Genres: R&B, hip hop
- Occupation(s): Record producer, multi-instrumentalist
- Years active: 2010–present
- Labels: Rebel Rock

Danny Morris (PKA Mr. Morris) is an American songwriter and record producer. He was signed to fellow producer Jim Jonsin's Rebel Rock Entertainment from 2011 to 2013, during which he co-wrote Jonsin's productions; the Billboard Hot 100-top 50 singles "There Goes My Baby" by Usher, "Space Bound" by Eminem, "On My Level" by Wiz Khalifa, "Right There" by Nicole Scherzinger, and "Motivation" by Kelly Rowland. The former won Best Male R&B Performance at the 52nd Annual Grammy Awards, while the latter was nominated for Best Rap/Sung Collaboration at the 54th Annual Grammy Awards. After parting ways with Rebel Rock, he was credited on Meek Mill's 2015 single "All Eyes on You".

In addition to songwriting, Morris has also performed as a keyboardist on albums for artists including Fantasia, Monica, Pitbull, Nelly, and Yelawolf, among others.

== Awards and nominations ==
- "There Goes My Baby" (Usher) – 2010 BMI Award for songwriting
- "Motivation" (Kelly Rowland, Lil Wayne) – 2011 BMI Award for songwriting
- "There Goes My Baby" (Usher) – Billboard #1 Urban Radio Award 2010 for songwriting
- "Motivation" (Kelly Rowland, Lil Wayne) – Billboard #1 Urban Radio Award 2011 for songwriting
- "Motivation" (Kelly Rowland, Lil Wayne) - 2012 Billboard Music Award – Best R&B Song

== Singles ==
Year	Single	Chart positions					Album
Year	Single	US Hot 100	US R&B	US Rap	US Pop	UK	Album
2010	"There Goes My Baby" (Usher)	25	1	–	–	138	Raymond v. Raymond
2010	"Girls" (N-Dubz)	–	–	–	–	18	Love.Live.Life
2011	"On My Level" (Wiz Khalifa featuring Too Short)	52	30	19	–	–	Rolling Papers
2011	"Motivation" (Kelly Rowland featuring Lil Wayne)	19	1	–	24	169	Here I Am
2011	"Right There" (Nicole Scherzinger featuring 50 Cent)	39	–	–	17	3	Killer Love
2011	"Mr. Wrong" (Mary J. Blige featuring Drake)	87	15	–	–	–	My Life II... The Journey Continues (Act 1)
2012	"Lemme See" (Usher featuring Rick Ross)	46	2	–	–	–	Looking 4 Myself
2012	"Dive" (Usher)	–	34	–	–	–	Looking 4 Myself
2012	"In My City" (Priyanka Chopra featuring will.i.am) Remix by Mr. Morris	–	–	–	–	–	In My City (Remixes)
2014	"Good Girl, Bad Girl" (Trevor Jackson)	–	–	–	–	–	Ms. Jackson
2014	"Spending the Night Alone" (Adrian Marcel)	–	–	–	–	–	Spending the Night Alone
2015	"All Eyes on You" (Meek Mill featuring Nicki Minaj & Chris Brown)	21	1	5	–	55	Dreams Worth More Than Money
