= Scream (Usher song) =

2012 single by Usher

Single by Usher

from the album Looking 4 Myself
- Released: April 27, 2012
- Recorded: 2011
- Studio: MXM (Stockholm); Glenwood Place (Los Angeles); Conway Recording (Hollywood)
- Genre: Dance-pop; Eurodance; synth-pop; disco
- Length: 3:55
- Label: RCA
- Songwriters: Usher Raymond IV; Max Martin; Shellback; Savan Kotecha
- Producers: Max Martin; Shellback

Usher singles chronology
"Climax" (2012)	"Scream" (2012)	"Lemme See" (2012)

Music video
- "Scream" on YouTube

"Scream" is a song by American singer-songwriter Usher, released through RCA Records, as the second single from his seventh studio album Looking 4 Myself (2012). It was written by Usher, Savan Kotecha, Max Martin and Shellback, with production handled by the latter two. The song premiered on the internet on April 26, 2012, and was released the following day as a digital download. "Scream" is primarily a dance-pop, Eurodance, synthpop, and disco track. Critics compared its musical structure to that of Usher's 2010 single "DJ Got Us Fallin' in Love", which was also co-written by Martin, Kotecha, and Shellback. "Scream" was noted to contain heavily sexual overtones within its lyrics.

"Scream" peaked at number nine on the US Billboard Hot 100 chart, and went on to sell over three million copies in the United States. It was certified 3× platinum by the Recording Industry Association of America (RIAA). The song peaked within the top five in several other countries, including Canada, South Korea, and the United Kingdom. It went on to be certified gold by the Bundesverband Musikindustrie (BVMI) and IFPI Denmark (IFPI) for shipments of 150,000 and 15,000 copies, respectively. The song received positive reviews from music critics, who praised its production, though some were ambivalent towards its originality.

Usher performed "Scream" during several events and shows, including the Off-Broadway show Fuerza Bruta, the 2012 Billboard Music Awards, Saturday Night Live, iHeartRadio Music Festival, Summertime Ball, iTunes Festival, BBC Live Lounge and E3 2012. An accompanying music video premiered on the internet on June 12, 2012. Directed by direction duo BB GUN, the video contains footage from the Fuerza Bruta show, with Usher reenacting his role as The Running Man, dancing with his love interest and running into a brick wall towards the video's closure.

== Production and release ==
"Scream" premiered on the internet on April 26, 2012, and was released as a digital download the following day. It was sent to mainstream and rhythmic radio on May 1, 2012. The song was released as the follow-up to "Climax", as the second single from Usher's seventh studio album Looking 4 Myself.

Usher explained to MTV that "Scream" was a record which "represented the other side of the [album]", comparing "Climax" to the former song:

Whereas the first song was a little bit more artistic and a little bit more soulful, and it has done everything, it probably exceeded my expectations, I mean, from the moment I was able to give it away. I was able to kind of be reintroduced in a way musically, and thank you to [producer] Diplo, but 'Scream' is really like the next step. It's just in time for summer and the type of experience that I want people to get out of the album.

== Composition and lyrics ==
"Scream"
A 23-second sample of "Scream". It is a dance-pop, Eurodance, synth-pop, and disco song, that consists of heavily sexual lyrics.

"Scream" has a running duration of three minutes and fifty-five seconds. It is written in the key of G minor, and has a tempo of 128 beats per minute. The dance-pop, Eurodance, synth-pop, and disco track contains a four-on-the-floor rhythmic pattern, while making heavy use of synthesizers and bass. DJ Booth described its sound as keeping with "current audiences" saying "Max Martin goes for broke on the production tip" with instrumentals "that builds to an explosive, synth-drenched chorus". About.com wrote that in terms of themes, "Scream" is similar to Usher's "Yeah!" (2004) and "Love in This Club" (2008). Rap-Up compared its musical elements to Usher's 2010 hits "DJ Got Us Fallin' in Love" and "OMG". Idolator's Robbie Daw wrote that the song "follows a dance-pop formula you can hear when flipping to any pop station on the radio". Steve Jones of USA Today perceived that "Scream" achieves the same effect as the "crunk-fueled" "Yeah!" along with "Euphoria".

"Scream" contains heavily sexual lyrics. MTV's Jenna Hally Rubenstein wrote that Usher sings about a "hot chick and how it'll be a total cinch for him to get her home", in the line "I see you over there, so hypnotic/ Thinking 'bout what I do to that body.../ Got no drink in my hand/ But I'm wasted/ Getting drunk of the thought of you naked/ I get you like ooh, baby, baby." In the chorus, he sings "If you wanna scream 'yeah', let me know and I'll take you there / Get you going like a-ooh baby baby, ooh baby baby, a-ooh baby baby, ooh baby / If you want it done right, hope you're ready to go." DJ Booth depicted the track to be about orgasms. Digital Spy's Lewis Corner wrote that "Scream" contains "sex-fuelled lyrics" portrayed in the line "I see you over there so hypnotic/ Thinkin' 'bout what I'd do to that body".

== Critical reception ==
The song received generally positive reviews from music critics. Andrew Leahey of The Washington Times liked the track's use of instrumentals, perceiving that Usher "holds onto his crown" by doing this, and by combining "Ibiza club music". PopMatters' Matt Cibula lauded Usher's vocals, writing that he "absolutely rips "Climax" and "What Happened to U", nails party anthems like "Scream" and "Euphoria" to the wall". Lewis Corner of Digital Spy depicted "Scream" to be "a seductive club number of chest-popping beats and sex-fuelled lyrics". DJ Booth viewed that Usher "takes to the track like a fish to water" by portraying confidence and sex-appeal to a woman in a club. Rap-Up depicted the song as an "adrenaline-fueled record" comparing it to Usher's "OMG" and "DJ Got Us Fallin' in Love" (2010). Billboard's Jem Aswad declared "Scream" as one of the "stellar" tracks on the album.

By contrast, The A.V. Club's Evan Rytlewski wrote that the song opens Looking 4 Myself on a "discouragingly perfunctory note", though complimented Usher for not using auto-tune to alter his vocals. Idolator's Robbie Daw was ambivalent towards the track, writing that "Scream" contains "a dance-pop formula you can hear when flipping to any pop station on the radio". Neon Limelight disapproved of the track as a whole for being generic, saying that the song is a disappointment compared to its previous single "Climax". Melinda Newman of HitFix showed a similar opinion, also noting the track as generic.

== Chart performance ==
On the Billboard Hot 100 "Scream" moved from number eleven to ten on the week of June 30, 2012, becoming Usher's eighteenth and to date, last top ten single on the chart. It sold 119,000 digital copies that week. With the song, Usher remains the male artist with the most Hot 100 top-ten hits, commencing from September 6, 1997, his first single to enter the top-ten. On the week of July 21, 2012 "Scream" had sold one million digital copies, selling 76,000 units that week. "Scream" remained on the Hot 100 for 21 weeks before dropping out. On the week of September 15, 2012 the song topped the US Billboard Hot Dance Club Songs chart, becoming Usher's first number one and second top three single on the chart from Looking 4 Myself, following "Climax". The song reached number six on the US Pop Songs chart, where it remained for twenty weeks before dropping out. It peaked at number 25 on the US Adult Pop Songs chart, dropping off after thirteen weeks. "Scream" was certified platinum by the Recording Industry Association of America (RIAA) on April 24, 2012.

"Scream" entered the Australian Singles Chart at number 48 on the week of August 19, 2012, reaching its peak at number eleven twelve weeks later. It remained on the chart for fifteen weeks, and was certified 2× platinum by the Australian Recording Industry Association (ARIA), for shipments of 140,000 copies. Due to digital downloads, "Scream" debuted on the South Korea Gaon International Chart at number thirty on April 22, 2012, with sales of 9,333 digital copies. The following week, it rose 26 positions to its peak at number four, selling 51,758 digital units. "Scream" peaked at number four on Canadian Singles Chart. The song debuted and peaked at number five on the UK Singles Chart, becoming the second single from Looking 4 Myself to reach the top five in the country, following "Climax". "Scream" reached the top ten on the Hungarian Singles Chart and Japanese Singles Chart, charting at number six and seven, respectively.

"Scream" peaked in the top thirty on several charts, including the Austrian Singles Chart, Dutch Singles Chart, Swiss Singles Chart and German Singles Chart; the song was certified gold in Germany by the Bundesverband Musikindustrie (BVMI), for shipments of 150,000 units. It was certified gold by the IFPI Denmark (IFPI), denoting shipments of 15,000 copies. The song was less successful in other countries, peaking within the top thirty in several territories. "Scream" charted in several year-end charts, including the UK Singles Chart, US Billboard Hot 100 and US Hot Dance Club Songs, peaking at number 83, 44 and 25, respectively.

== Music video ==
An accompanying music video for the song premiered on June 12, 2012. The video was directed by BB GUN (consisting of Maxim Bohichik and Alex Bergman). The video integrates footage from Usher's performance during the Off-Broadway show Fuerza Bruta, where he first performed the song. In the video Usher takes the role of The Running Man, the character he portrayed during his performance. Dressed in a white suit, the video opens with Usher strolling and singing to the song. Throughout the video inter-cuts to a woman swimming above the ceiling. Entering the chorus, Usher begins to run, which he then instantly changes into different attire for the second verse, with the video inter-cutting to both the women and Usher in his original white suit. Following the second chorus, Usher starts dancing with the women. He then begins to sprint, ending the video with him bursting through a brick wall, showing clips of the Fuerza Bruta performance with Usher running across the venue's conveyor belt. Rap-Up reviewed the music video positively, writing that Usher "makes all the right moves in the exhilarating video [...] Mr. Raymond shows off his fancy footwork in a crisp white suit as he glides across the stage during his show with Broadway's Fuerza Bruta." The music video on YouTube has received over 75 million views as of May 2024.

== Live performances ==
Usher performed the song for the first time during the Off-Broadway show Fuerza Bruta. He appeared on Saturday Night Live on May 12, 2012, to perform "Scream" and "Climax". Usher performed with two back up singers and dancers who flanked him on either side, with his band accompanying him with instrumentals. He performed the song at the 2012 Billboard Music Award. Dressed in a tuxedo suit and top hat, Usher was met with a woman dressed in a mask and red ball gown. The two then started dancing intimately onstage, executing numerous dance sequences. In a positive review of the performance, Gil Kaufman of MTV News wrote that Usher "got all gothic and mysterious with a flashy, Las Vegas-worthy, high-concept staging." On June 11, 2012, Usher performed the song during his concert at Hammersmith Apollo in London. The song was performed during E3 2012 to promote Dance Central 3 in which Usher performed choreography portrayed in the video game to the attendees.

== Track listing ==
US digital download

1. "Scream" – 3:54

Ireland and UK digital download

1. "Scream" – 3:55
2. "Climax" (Kaskade remix) – 6:38

CD single

1. "Scream" – 3:54
2. "Climax" (Mike D remix) – 3:38

Scream (Remixes)

1. "Scream" (Fuego Radio remix) – 4:35
2. "Scream" (Project 46 remix) – 3:42
3. "Scream" (R3hab remix) – 5:20
4. "Scream" (Clinton Sparks remix) – 4:57
5. "Scream" (Oliver $ remix) – 6:17
6. "Scream" (Pierce Fulton remix) – 3:52
7. "Scream" (Surkin remix) – 4:07
8. "Scream" (Wax Motif remix) – 6:17

== Credits and personnel ==
Recording locations

- Vocal recording – MXM Studios, Stockholm, Sweden; Glenwood Place Studios, Los Angeles, CA; Conway Recording Studios, Hollywood, CA
- Mixing – Mixstar Studios, Virginia Beach, VA.

Personnel

- Songwriting – Max Martin, Shellback, Savan Kotecha, Usher Raymond IV
- Production – Max Martin, Shellback
- Keyboard and programming – Shellback
- Background vocals – Max Martin
- Recording – Sam Holland
- Assistant recording – Jorge Velasco
- Vocal recording – Mark "Exit" Goodchild
- Assistant vocal recording – Eric Weaver
- Mixing – Serban Ghenea
- Mix engineer – John Hanes
- Assistant mix engineer – Phil Seaford

Credits adapted from the liner notes of Looking 4 Myself, RCA Records.

== Charts ==
=== Weekly charts ===
Weekly chart performance for "Scream"
Chart (2012)	Peak position
Australia (ARIA)	11
Austria (Ö3 Austria Top 40)	15
Belgium (Ultratop 50 Flanders)	22
Belgium Dance (Ultratop Flanders)	8
Belgium Urban (Ultratop Flanders)	9
Belgium (Ultratop 50 Wallonia)	33
Belgium Dance (Ultratop Wallonia)	4
Canada Hot 100 (Billboard)	4
Canada CHR/Top 40 (Billboard)	2
Denmark (Tracklisten)	23
France (SNEP)	29
Germany (GfK)	17
Hungary (Rádiós Top 40)	21
Hungary (Single Top 40)	6
Ireland (IRMA)	23
Japan Hot 100 (Billboard)	7
Lebanon (The Official Lebanese Top 20)	14
Netherlands (Dutch Top 40)	18
Netherlands (Single Top 100)	28
New Zealand (Recorded Music NZ)	21
Russia Airplay (TopHit)	45
Scottish Singles Sales (Official Charts)	4
South Korea (GAON)	4
Spain (Promusicae)	28
Sweden (Sverigetopplistan)	50
Switzerland (Schweizer Hitparade)	18
UK Dance (Official Charts)	2
UK Singles (Official Charts)	5
Ukraine Airplay (TopHit)	19
US Billboard Hot 100	9
US Adult Pop Airplay (Billboard)	25
US Dance Club Songs (Billboard)	1
US Dance Airplay (Billboard)	5
US Pop Airplay (Billboard)	6
US Rhythmic Airplay (Billboard)	3
US Tropical Airplay (Billboard)	32

=== Year-end charts ===
2012 year-end chart performance for "Scream"
Chart (2012)	Position
Australia (ARIA)	94
Australia Urban (ARIA)	31
Belgium (Ultratop 50 Flanders)	81
Belgium Dance (Ultratop Flanders)	46
Belgium Urban (Ultratop Flanders)	24
Belgium Dance (Ultratop Wallonia)	49
Canada (Canadian Hot 100)	38
France (SNEP)	126
Germany (Media Control AG)	71
Netherlands (Dutch Top 40)	74
Netherlands (Mega Top 50)	73
Netherlands (Download Top 100)	100
UK Singles (Official Charts Company)	83
Ukraine Airplay (TopHit)	103
US Billboard Hot 100	44
US Dance Club Songs (Billboard)	25
US Dance/Mix Show Airplay (Billboard)	22
US Mainstream Top 40 (Billboard)	32
US Rhythmic (Billboard)	23

== Certifications ==
Certifications and sales for "Scream"
Region	Certification	Certified units/sales
Australia (ARIA)	2× Platinum	140,000^{‡}
Canada (Music Canada)	3× Platinum	240,000^{‡}
Denmark (IFPI Danmark)	Gold	15,000^{^}
Germany (BVMI)	Gold	150,000^{^}
New Zealand (RMNZ)	Platinum	30,000^{‡}
United Kingdom (BPI)	Platinum	600,000^{‡}
United States (RIAA)	3× Platinum	3,000,000^{‡}
Streaming
Denmark (IFPI Danmark)	Platinum	1,800,000^{†}
^{^} Shipments figures based on certification alone.^{‡} Sales+streaming figures based on certification alone.^{†} Streaming-only figures based on certification alone.

== Release history ==
Release dates for "Scream"
Country	Date	Format	Label	Ref.
United States	April 27, 2012	Digital download	RCA Records	
United States	May 1, 2012	Mainstream radio	RCA Records	
Germany	June 1, 2012	CD single	RCA Records	
Ireland	June 1, 2012	Digital download	RCA Records	
United Kingdom	June 3, 2012	Digital download	RCA Records	

== See also ==
- List of number-one dance singles of 2012 (U.S.)
