= Euphoria (Usher song) =

Usher song

Song by Usher

from the album Looking 4 Myself
- Recorded: 2012; Silent Sound Studios (Atlanta); Glenwood Place Studios (Burbank)
- Genre: Dance-pop; euro-trance
- Length: 4:20
- Label: RCA
- Songwriters: Axel Hedfors; Juan Najera; Klas Åhlund; Ryon Lovett; Sebastian Ingrosso; Steve Angello; James Samuel Harris III; Terry Lewis; Usher Raymond IV
- Producers: Swedish House Mafia; Natural

"Euphoria" is a song recorded by American singer Usher for his seventh studio album Looking 4 Myself (2012). It was written by Axel Hedfors, Juan Najera, Klas Åhlund, Ryon Lovett, Sebastian Ingrosso, Steve Angello, Terry Lewis and Usher himself. The production of the song was done by Axwell, Angello and Ingrosso under their stage name Swedish House Mafia. After their joint performance at the 2010 American Music Awards, Usher and Swedish House Mafia managed to start working on recording sessions for Usher's seventh studio album in Atlanta.

"Euphoria" is a dance-pop and euro-trance song which "include the DJs' glimmering synths while Usher croons in his coolly-controlled falsetto." The track received generally mixed to positive reviews from contemporary music critics with many of them praising its Ibiza sound which is also present on Usher's previous singles "OMG" and "DJ Got Us Fallin' in Love". Upon the release of Looking 4 Myself, the song debuted at number 60 on the South Korea Gaon International Chart, with sales of 6,029 digital copies. This song appears as DLC along with "Twisted" in Dance Central 3 with choreography from both Usher and his choreographer Aakomon “AJ” Jones.

== Production ==
"It was a lot and they're three different DJs but when they come together, they are a production conglomerate. So tryna get them together at the same time, when I was in Atlanta, we made the most of our time and we cranked out two records."

—Usher talking about his collaboration with Swedish House Mafia

Speaking to The BoomBox, Usher explained that he wanted to work with Swedish House Mafia ever since they both performed together at the 2010 American Music Awards. The group agreed to work with Usher, saying "We'll see if we can come to Atlanta, and if we can, we'll start to work on some tracks, writing, and moving the ball forward." In an interview with MTV News, regarding the collaboration with Usher, Steve Angello commented, [sic] "We met Usher couple of years ago, we did the AMA's together and then we came to hang-out in Ibiza. We were in Atlanta and we were all working together for five days. He has always been a great artist and he always knows what he wants so it is a good collaboration all in all. We rather work with somebody who we respect, than to rather work with just big name."

== Composition ==
"Euphoria"
A 22-second sample of the chorus of "Euphoria", a dance-pop and euro-trance song, which "include the DJs' glimmering synths while Usher croons in his coolly-controlled falsetto."

"Euphoria" is a dance-pop and euro-trance song with a length of four minutes and 20 seconds. It was written by Axel Hedfors, Juan Najera, Klas Åhlund, Ryon Lovett, Sebastian Ingrosso, Steve Angello, Terry Lewis and Usher himself. The production of the song was helmed by Hedfors, Angello and Ingrosso under their stage name Swedish House Mafia. Swedish House Mafia together with disc jockey Alesso also co-produced one more song from Looking 4 Myself entitled "Numb". According to Lewis Corner of Digital Spy both "Euphoria" and "Numb" "include the DJs' glimmering synths while he [Usher] croons in his coolly-controlled falsetto." Jim Farber of The New York Daily News wrote that the songs which were produced by Swedish House Mafia propose a possible crossover point from electronica to R&B like Usher’s biggest hit "Yeah!" did from crunk to soul. Mark "Exit" Goodchild recorded the song at Silent Sound Studios in Atlanta and Glenwood Place Studios in Burbank, while Jorge Velasco, Kory Aaron and Randy Warnken served as recording assistants. It was mixed by Manny Marroquin at Larrabee Sound Studios, Universal City, with Chris Galland and Delbert Bowers serving as mixing assistants. Natural did the vocal production of the song while the track's producers Hedfors, Ingrosso and Angello provided the complete instrumentation of "Euphoria".

== Reception ==
"Euphoria" received critical acclaim. In a review of Looking 4 Myself, Matt Cibula of PopMatters commented that Usher "absolutely rips 'Climax' and 'What Happened to U', nails party anthems like 'Scream' and 'Euphoria' to the wall, and puts across harder things even while multitracking himself 35 times over with the greatest of ease." Nathan S. of DJ Booth wrote that "'Euphoria' hews even closer to the 4 AM in Ibiza template, as does the essentially identical Scream." People's Chuck Arnold wrote that Usher "is an Ibiza-ready club kid on electro thumpers like current single 'Scream' and the Swedish House Mafia-produced 'Euphoria' that build on the success of 'OMG', 'DJ Got Us Fallin' in Love' and 'Without You' (with David Guetta)." Regarding the song Jody Rosen of Slate wrote that "Euphoria" "is an absurdly bombastic dance track, concocted by Usher and a few hundred thousand Scandinavians."

Erika Ramirez of Billboard concluded that "Euphoria" is grittier, more startling and arguably more powerful than "Numb" and commented that it "leaves listeners with a feeling that reflects the song's uplifting title". Alex Macpherson of guardian.co.uk was more critical to the song and labeled it as "eurotrash trance", while Danny Walker of RWD Magazine called the song pacy. According to Carrie Battan of Pitchfork Media Usher "sounds most uncomfortable and the least sharp on overblown club tracks 'Euphoria' and 'Numb', and the presence of rote numbers is almost comically predictable." Katherine St Asaph of Popdust stated that the track would sound great in the clubs, however it isn't standout by any means, further stating "Usher and Swedish House Mafia talk about euphoria, but what they deliver is perfectly passable excitement."

== Credits and personnel ==
Recording and mixing

- Recorded at Silent Sound Studios, Atlanta, Georgia; Glenwood Place Studios, Burbank, California; mixed at Larrabee Sound Studios, Universal City, California

Personnel

- Songwriting – Axel Hedfors, Juan Najera, Klas Åhlund, Ryon Lovett, Sebastian Ingrosso, Steve Angello, Terry Lewis, Usher Raymond IV
- Production – Swedish House Mafia
- Vocal production – Natural
- Mixing – Manny Marroquin
- Mixing assistants – Chris Galland, Delbert Bowers
- Recording – Mark "Exit" Goodchild
- Recording assistants – Jorge Velasco, Kory Aaron, Randy Warnken
- Instrumentation – Axel Hedfors, Sebastian Ingrosso, Steve Angello

Credits adapted from the liner notes of Looking 4 Myself, RCA Records.

== Chart ==
Upon the release of Looking 4 Myself, due to digital downloads "Euphoria" charted in the lower regions on the singles chart in South Korea. It debuted on the South Korea Gaon International Chart at number 60 on June 10, 2012, with sales of 6,029 digital copies.

Chart (2012)	Peak position
South Korea Gaon International Chart	60
