= Fuerza Bruta =

Argentinian play

Fuerza Bruta (literally meaning "brute force") is a postmodern theatre show that premiered in Buenos Aires in 2005 and was created by Diqui James. It is also the name of the company that produces the show. Members of the company that created Fuerza Bruta were co-creators of a previous company called De La Guarda, which presented a similar show named Villa Villa. It is a very energetic spectacle under the motto Brute Force, features interaction between the performers and the public, and is described as a 360 degree experience.

The show opened Off-Broadway in New York City at the Daryl Roth Theater in 2007 and closed August 28, 2016.

The show has since travelled over the world. It has been performed in Buenos Aires, Seoul, Cordoba, Bogotá, Querétaro, Miami, Chicago, Lisbon, Bilbao, Berlin, Moscow, Shanghai, London, Edinburgh, Antwerp, Lima, Taipei, Macau and Madrid and is scheduled for Istanbul, Tel Aviv, Manila, Las Vegas, Tokyo, Limerick, Heerlen, and London again in 2024.

== Direction and production ==
- Diqui James
- Gaby Kerpel
- Fabio Dáquila
- Alejandro García
- Agustina James
- Lincoln Juán Morallez

== Noted cast members ==
- R&B musician Usher performed in Fuerza Bruta as part of the promotion for his 2012 album Looking 4 Myself.
- Daniel "Cloud" Campos
- Super Junior member Eunhyuk
- H.O.T member Jang Woo-hyuk
- First Filipino American Rockette and original North American cast member of De La Guarda, Rose Mallare
- Monsta X member Shownu

== Filmography ==
The show/company acts in a sequence of the film Tesis sobre un homicidio (H. Goldfrid, 2013).

Preceded by Goran Bregović	Eurovision Song Contest; Final Interval act 2009	Succeeded by Madcon
