= Gaby Kerpel =

Argentine composer

Gaby Kerpel is a composer born and raised in Argentina.

Kerpel belongs to a Latin electronic music collective known as Zizek. Under the name King Coya he performs reinterpreted Colombian cumbia music.

As a composer, his songs include De La Guarda, Fuerza Bruta, and Carnabailito.
