= Chris Applebaum =

American video director

- Born: 1970 (age 55–56); Los Angeles, California, U.S.
- Education: Hampshire College
- Occupation: Director
- Years active: 1992–present
- Website: chrisapplebaum.com

Chris Applebaum is a music video director from Los Angeles, California. His videos include Miley Cyrus' Party in the U.S.A., Usher's Dive, and Demi Lovato's Heart Attack. 30 of his videos have reached #1 on the MTV charts. Applebaum has also directed fitness videos, beauty product advertisements, and commercials for companies such as Skechers and Carl's Jr.

== Life and career ==
=== Early life and college ===
Applebaum was born in 1970 in Los Angeles, California and studied film at Hampshire College in Amherst, Massachusetts.

While still in college, Applebaum began directing videos for independent rock bands. His first video was released in 1992 for Chicago band Material Issue's song Everything. When Applebaum was 19, MTV offered him an opportunity to join their On-Air Promos department in New York City.

Chris Applebaum signed with Satellite Films at the age of 21, becoming their youngest ever signed director, and directed over 250 films under this contract. In the 1990s, Applebaum founded a record label called Indi 500.

=== Career and influence ===
The 1995 video for Better Than Ezra's "Good", directed by Applebaum, brought him a higher level of recognition.

In 1997 he directed a video for Size 14's lead single Claire Danes Poster, the video remained unreleased though.

In the coming years, he would direct Fountains of Wayne's "Stacy's Mom", a Carl's Jr. commercial featuring Paris Hilton, and advertisements for CoverGirl and Smirnoff. His Carl's Jr. commercial was dubbed by BDS Neilsen as the most aired TV commercial of all time.

In 2007, Applebaum's video for Rihanna's "Umbrella" was released. Applebaum later told Genius, "[Umbrella is] definitely the video that I'm the proudest of," and the video has yielded the highest sale rate of any music video on the iTunes store.

Applebaum's video for "Stacy's Mom" influenced a campaign for Apple's iPod, and his video for Semisonic's "Closing Time" is credited for inspiring aspects of Season 6 of The X-Files. Applebaum has won several awards, including the 2010 MUCH Best International Video for Party in the U.S.A., the 2007 VMA Video of the Year award for Umbrella, and the 2006 MUCH Best Video for a Female Artist for S.O.S.

Applebaum has also directed several other notable videos including "Party in the U.S.A.". The director claims that he now focuses on directing commercials rather than music videos.

== See also ==
- List of music videos directed by Chris Applebaum
