= Looking 4 Myself =

2012 studio album by Usher

Studio album by Usher
- Released: June 8, 2012
- Recorded: 2011–2012
- Genres: Dance-pop; R&B
- Length: 56:56
- Label: RCA
- Producers: @Autorowhit; Klas Åhlund; Danja; Diplo; Earl & E; @Flippa123; Keith Harris; Jim Jonsin; Axwell; Sebastian Ingrosso; Steve Angello; Alessandro Lindblad; Rico Love; Max Martin; Pierre Medor; Natural; Omen; Pharrell; @Pop Wansel; Ariel Rechtshaid; Anthony Life; Salaam Remi; Frank Romano; Noah "40" Shebib; Shellback; Luke Steele; Swedish House Mafia; Surahn; will.i.am

Usher chronology
Versus (2010)	Looking 4 Myself (2012)	Hard II Love (2016)

Singles from Looking 4 Myself
- 1. "Climax" Released: February 22, 2012; 2. "Scream" Released: April 27, 2012; 3. "Lemme See" Released: May 8, 2012; 4. "Numb" Released: August 21, 2012; 5. "Dive" Released: August 28, 2012

Looking 4 Myself is the seventh studio album by American singer Usher. Released on June 8, 2012, by RCA Records, it is his first album for RCA after the October 2011 merger of the Jive Records group that also included his label, LaFace Records; which resulted in both labels being consolidated into the RCA label group. Many producers worked on the songs, and the album features appearances from Luke Steele and ASAP Rocky. Inspired by the electronic duo Empire of the Sun and listening to music originating from several locations, Usher intended the album to contain a more experimental sound, that remained relevant to the music of its time. Defined as "revolutionary pop" by the singer, critics noted that Looking 4 Myself is a dance-pop and R&B album that incorporates the genres pop, hip hop, electronic, Europop, and dubstep. Critic Barry Walters has noted how elements of some of its R&B songs were inspired by the emerging alternative R&B genre.

The album debuted atop the US Billboard 200 chart, selling 128,000 copies in its first week, becoming Usher's fourth number one album in the country. As of October 2014, Looking 4 Myself has sold 504,000 copies in the United States, according to Nielsen SoundScan. Worldwide, it attained top-ten positions in over eight other countries including Australia, Canada, Germany and the United Kingdom.

Looking 4 Myself was supported by five singles: "Climax", "Scream", "Lemme See" featuring Rick Ross, "Numb", and "Dive". "Climax" peaked in the top-twenty on the Billboard Hot 100 chart, and topped the Hot R&B/Hip-Hop Songs chart for eleven weeks. "Scream" peaked in the top-ten on the Hot 100 and several other countries. "Numb" obtained moderate international chart success and peaked at number 69 on the Billboard Hot 100 chart. Usher promoted for the Looking 4 Myself by performing in several shows; including the off-broadway show Fuerza Bruta: Look Up, Saturday Night Live and Good Morning America.

== Background ==
In 2010, Usher released his sixth studio album Raymond v. Raymond, with a mixed critical response and commercial success; the project went on to earn two Grammy Awards at the 2011 ceremony. His follow-up record was originally rumored to be titled The Shanetance and due for release on March 23, 2012, though Usher later refuted the speculation.

What he wanted to do [on Looking 4 Myself] was explore himself musically. He stepped outside of what was safe and normal. He wanted to make an album that expressed where he was going sonically and not just where he's been for the past 12 to 15 years. He's growing, developing, moving, shaking, and being something that's new, cultural, and that's affecting people sonically. That's kind of forcing the people to grow and elevate.

— Rico Love, Billboard

While on hiatus between the release of his first EP Versus and Looking 4 Myself, Usher told AOL Music that he mainly traveled to various locations to listen to music which he "felt was really significant in terms of energy." Some of these locations included the Coachella Music Festival, Ibiza, Germany, Las Vegas, Miami and Southern France. He described some of the music as a "little bit more electronic, some of it a little bit more dance. Some of it, a bit more world." It was Australian electronic music duo Empire of the Sun that inspired Usher to produce the album's title track, with producer Rico Love, which led to the singer collaborating with producers he normally would not work with or admired, such as Diplo. Usher's intention for the album was one "that was not genre-specific but just experimental". During an episode of NBC's The Voice, Usher called the album "by far one of my most risky records ... I wanted to challenge myself". Looking 4 Myself was chosen as the album's title as it described Usher's 'musical journey'.

RCA Records CEO Peter Edge spoke to Billboard on which two specific groups they want the album to appeal to, "By the time the album is available, Usher's collective audience will have had a chance to really sample a number of songs from the album [...] the end result will be an Usher album that appeals to his earliest fans, and people who may have never listened to or owned an Usher album before." Prior to the album's release, Usher was put under the management of Grace Miguel—whom he is in a relationship with—replacing Randy Phillips, who managed Usher for a short period after he split with his mother, Jonnetta Patton for a second time, in 2008. The cover art and track listing for both the standard and deluxe edition of the album were revealed on May 3, 2012. On June 4, 2012, 30-second snippets of each track were leaked on the internet.

== Production ==
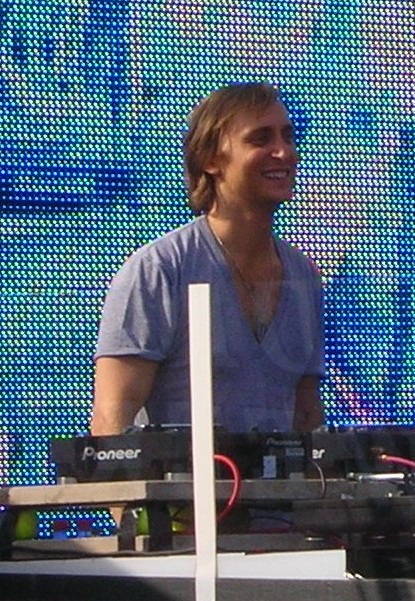
Usher hoped to initiate a collaboration with David Guetta (pictured)

Diplo, Rico Love, Jim Jonsin, Salaam Remi and Max Martin were the first producers confirmed for Looking 4 Myself in March 2012. After Usher had attended the Coachella Music Festival, he worked with electronic music duo Empire of the Sun to produce the album's title track; he described the band's music as an "incredible sound". The collaboration and the band's music inspired Usher to produce more experimental music, and to produce records with producers he normally would not work with or admired. DJ and producer Diplo was one of them, and so both collaborated on the album's lead single, "Climax". They discussed the concept throughout the song's development and how it relates to Usher's life, as Diplo "tried to help realise these lyrics and feelings." After conceiving some melody lines, they wrote the song in about an hour. Usher and Diplo worked on the song's production for two months, recording in studios in Los Angeles, New York, and Atlanta.

Usher wanted to work with Swedish electronic dance music trio Swedish House Mafia since their joint performance at the American Music Awards in 2011. The group later agreed to work with the singer, where they intended to travel to Atlanta to work on track production, writing, and to "move the ball forward." Steve Angello, a member of Swedish House Mafia, told MTV News that the group hung out with Usher in Ibiza after the awards ceremony; they worked with him in Atlanta for five days. They produced the final tracks "Numb", "Euphoria" and "Way to Count", with the latter not making the final cut.

Usher contacted several producers and musicians who he endeavoured to, but ended up not collaborating with, including Skrillex, Calvin Harris, Afrojack, Kaskade, Little Dragon, and David Guetta. The latter had revealed to The Hollywood Reporter in May 2012 that he and Usher had worked on a "crazy" record, though it did not appear on the album due to a scheduling conflict; rapper Ludacris was involved in the song's production. English singer-songwriter Labrinth spent two studio sessions with Usher in April 2012 working on Looking 4 Myself.

== Composition ==
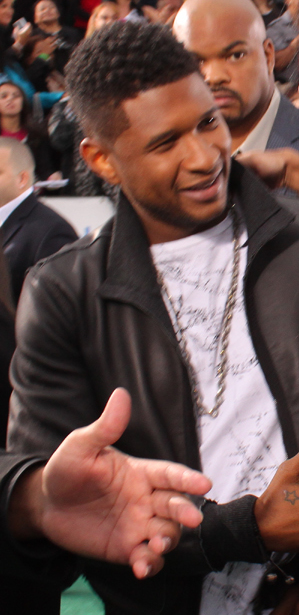
Usher on the red carpet in 2011

=== Influence and sound ===
Usher told Sylelist in November 2011 that he is working on a new genre of music, which he depicted as "revolutionary pop". He explained that it "combines several other music genres to form a new sound". In a later interview, Usher clarified that his latter quote was misinterpreted, in that it is not a specific type of sound, but rather what he found as inspiration behind where he was and what he was working on "was revolutionary". The album incorporates pop styles, which Usher described as being "relevant" to its time and "what [people are] listening to". Randall Roberts of Los Angeles Times summed up the production of the album, writing that it "draws on a world of styles permeating pop culture in 2012", by implementing the genres electronic dance, dubstep, pop and Hip-Hop to create a hybrid pop. AllMusic's Andy Kellman described revolutionary pop as "contemporary pop-oriented R&B, or european dance-pop, or some combination of the two", and that the album is "weighted more heavily toward dance-pop" compared to his previous efforts.

=== Songs and lyrics ===
Looking 4 Myself opens with club track "Can't Stop Won't Stop", which contains the melody of Billy Joel's 1983 "Uptown Girl"; it contains a synth heavy hook and incorporates elements of dubstep. "Scream" is another club oriented track, with heavily sexual lyrics. The song makes heavy use of bass—particularly in the chorus—and is noted to be reminiscent of Usher's "DJ Got Us Fallin' in Love" (2010). The third track, "Climax", is a quiet storm-style slow jam, built around a haunting riff, complemented by sparse drum machine and some musical accompaniment. Its lyrics focuses on Usher's anguish over a failed relationship, with its title referring to the turning point of a relationship. Follow-up track "I Care for U" is a mid-tempo R&B song, which fuses 90's R&B and hip-hop with dubstep, produced by American record producer Danja. "Show Me", another Danja produced record, is described by Randall Roberts of Los Angeles Times to feature "driving house synth-claps with a propellant techno rhythm bubbling beneath it." A mid-tempo track, "Lemme See" contains a synth-heavy production with contributed vocals from American rapper Rick Ross. "Twisted", which was produced by and features record producer-rapper "Pharrell", is the seventh track. It is a 60's retro-soul track, with heavy use of percussions and bass throughout. Usher described the track as "nostalgic", and explained that his intent was to also "modernize it", similar to records produced by Cee Lo, Bruno Mars and Andre 3000.

"Dive" discusses a commitment to a relationship, while containing a triple-entendre, according to Matt Cibula of PopMatters, initially singing about diving or oral sex, to discussing a commitment to a relationship. The ninth track is "What Happened to U"; it is a downtempo song, sung by Usher primarily using falsetto. It samples the late The Notorious B.I.G.'s "One More Chance". The album's title track features Empire of the Sun member Luke Steele, and is both new wave and soft rock. The title refers to Usher's "musical journey", and the song was inspired by his travelling and the latter band. The first of the two Swedish House Mafia tracks is "Numb", a euro disco and electronic dance track, its lyrics message was described by Erika Ramirez of Billboard to simply be "Forget your troubles and fist-pump!". The next track is "Lessons for the Lover", a slow-tempo track with heavy production, produced by long-time collaborator Rico Love. Ramirez compared the track to songs from Usher's Confessions era. "Sins of my Father" is a soul song with prominent blues, dub, Motown and reggae influences; it is about being a "tortured soul" in a "volatile" relationship. Looking 4 Myself closes with "Euphoria", the second Swedish House Mafia produced track on the album. It is described as more "tense" and "powerful" compared to "Numb".

== Singles ==
The album's lead single "Climax" was leaked on February 14, 2012, and digitally released on February 22. "Climax" debuted on the Billboard Hot 100 chart at number eighty-one with 31,000 digital units sold on the week of March 10, 2012 and has since peaked at number 17. The song topped the Hot R&B/Hip-Hop Songs chart marking Usher's twelfth number one single on the chart, and overtaking R. Kelly as the ninth artist with the most number one's. "Climax" sustained the number one position for eleven weeks, tying with his 1997 "You Make Me Wanna..." as his longest running number one single on the chart. The accompanying music video was released on March 9, 2012, and was directed by Sam Pilling and filmed in Atlanta. The video shows Usher sitting in his car, contemplating on how to approach his ex-girlfriend inside her home, with numerous scenarios shown being thought out by Usher. The video was nominated for Best Male Video at the 2012 MTV Video Music Awards, losing to Chris Brown's "Turn Up the Music".

"Scream", the album's second single, premièred on SoundCloud on April 26, 2012. The song was produced by Savan Kotecha and Max Martin, the same duo who produced "DJ Got Us Fallin' in Love" (2010). "Scream" was made available for purchase as a digital download on April 27, 2012. It officially impacted the Top 40/Mainstream and rhythmic radio on May 1, 2012. The song peaked in the top ten in several charts, including the Billboard Hot 100, Canadian Hot 100, Japan Hot 100, Scottish Singles Chart and UK Singles Chart. An accompanying music video uses footage from Usher's performance in Fuerza Bruta in New York City. In the video, Usher gets intimate with his love interest; his dancing and choreography was compared to Michael Jackson's. The third single, "Lemme See" features rapper Rick Ross, and was made available for purchase as a digital download on May 4, 2012. The song was released to urban radio on May 8, 2012, and reached number two on the Hot R&B/Hip-Hop Songs chart. Internationally, "Lemme See" peaked at number ninety in the United Kingdom, and number eighty-eight in France. The official music video for the song was released on June 14, 2012, and was directed by Philip Andelman.

"Numb" is the album's fourth single, and was released to contemporary hit radio on August 28, 2012. It was produced by Swedish House Mafia, who also co-wrote the song with Usher. The song received generally positive acclaim from contemporary music critics with many of them praising its club-oriented production, labeling it as a potential success as a single. "Numb" was a moderate worldwide success, reaching the top-forty in five countries including Belgium, Germany and Australia. Usher released "Dive" as the fifth single, releasing the song to urban radio on August 28, 2012. The song was well received by critics, who lauded Usher's falsetto and overall vocals. Directed by Chris Applebaum, its music video shows Usher getting intimate with Victoria's Secret Angel model Chanel Iman, who plays as his love interest. "Dive" peaked on the South Korea Gaon International Chart at number fifty, and the Hot R&B/Hip-Hop Songs chart at number 34.

== Promotion ==
Usher held multiple private listening sessions for Looking 4 Myself. On April 27, 2012, he debuted the album in the off-broadway show Fuerza Bruta: Look Up, in Daryl Roth Theater in New York City. When speaking to MTV, he explained his reasoning for performing in the show "It's not often that you're able to give somewhat of a visual or an emotional kind of basis of what your songs mean [...] I felt like, yeah, it would be a physical challenge, yeah it would be a lot for me, but [I want to] at least try it, there are many times I'd seen the show and I'd only hoped that I would make it happen". Steven Horowitz of Rolling Stone commented that Usher "theatrically sequenced the entirety of the project to strobing lights and choreographed moves". Horowitz also praised the singer's performance, concluding that "the veteran entertainer reasserts himself as a master of rapturous dance fodder, capable of turning a room into a thumping rave with ease". Usher appeared on Saturday Night Live—hosted by Will Ferrell—where he performed the singles "Scream" and "Climax". He performed both singles again, in the 2012 Today summer concert, being the opening act of the series. Usher performed "Scream" in the 2012 Billboard Music Awards; during the performance he wore a black suit, bowler hat and bow tie while dancing with a masked female, who later disappeared behind a cape and was replaced by a male dancer who mirrored Usher's dance routines.

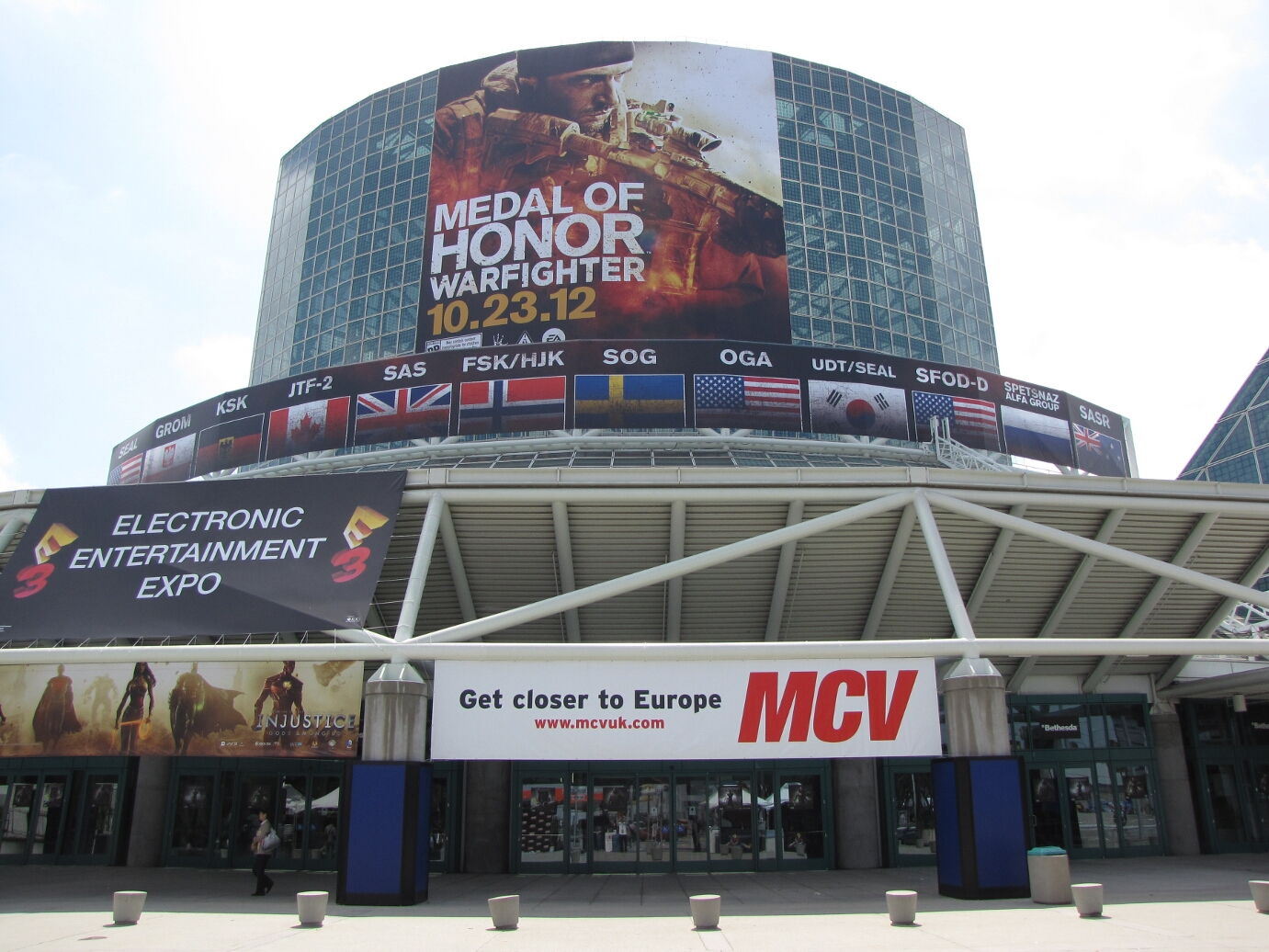
Usher performed during E3 2012 to promote both "Scream" and video game Dance Central 3.

On June 9, 2012, Usher performed in the UK, appearing in the Capital FM Summer Time Ball, his second appearance in his career. He entered the stage doing the moonwalk and then performed his 2010 single "OMG". Backed-up by female dancers while doing choreographed routines, he then performed several singles from his previous work and Looking 4 Myself, including "Yeah!", "Without You", "Climax" and "Scream". The singer again performed "Scream" in the 2012 Electronic Entertainment Expo in Los Angeles during Microsoft's conference. He performed the dance routines presented in the video game Dance Central 3, via the Kinect to the latter song. Usher promoted the album on its release date in the UK—June 11—by performing in a one-off concert in the Hammersmith Apollo in London. The performance was directed by Hamish Hamilton, and was streamed to Usher's VEVO channel on YouTube. The same week, he appeared on BBC Radio 1 Live Lounge, where he covered the song "Pumped Up Kicks" by Foster the People, and performed "Scream". The singer appeared on Good Morning America, where he spoke about Looking 4 Myself, and discussed his legal battle with ex-wife Tameka Foster. He performed "Climax" in the 2012 BET Awards; Kelly Carter of MTV described the performance as "fairly muted", due to Usher's appearance and dancing being minimalistic. He opened the 2012 iTunes Festival, performing songs from his previous studio album efforts and tracks from Looking 4 Myself which he performed for the first time, including "Can't Stop Won't Stop", "Lemme See", "Twisted", "Dive" and "Numb".

=== Tour ===
On September 18, 2012, Usher announced that he would embark on a concert tour, the Euphoria Tour, to further promote Looking 4 Myself. Usher planned to perform in countries including France, Germany, Belgium, Norway, Finland, Sweden, Switzerland and the United Kingdom. In partnership with Live Nation Global Touring, the tour was to commence on January 18, 2013, in Amsterdam, Netherlands and would conclude on March 14 in Nice, France. For the tour leg in the United Kingdom, British singer Rita Ora was scheduled to be an opening act. On September 25, 2012, Live Nation Global Touring announced that the tour will be postponed until the fall of 2013, due to Usher's participation in the reality talent show The Voice, where along with singer Shakira, he was a judge in the show's fourth season. The tour, however, was not rescheduled.

== Critical reception ==
Professional ratings
Aggregate scores
Source	Rating
Metacritic	75/100
Review scores
Source	Rating
AllMusic	3.5/5 stars
The A.V. Club	B−
Entertainment Weekly	B
The Guardian	4/5 stars
Los Angeles Times	3/4 stars
The Observer	3/5 stars
Pitchfork	7.6/10
Rolling Stone	3.5/5 stars
Slant	3/5 stars
USA Today	3.5/4 stars

At Metacritic, which assigns a normalized rating out of 100 to reviews from mainstream critics, the album has received an average score of 75, based on 19 reviews, indicating "generally favorable reviews". Alex Macpherson of The Guardian complimented Usher's vocals, saying that they "are in fine fettle", and found the album "most interesting" when it "goes in directions that don't cleave to obvious aesthetics". AllMusic's Andy Kellman felt that, despite Usher's shift to dance music, "he's more of a creative force when he's working with slower, soul-rooted material". Randall Roberts of the Los Angeles Times described the album as not genre defying, but instead uses the music styles of the [current] era– it's "more pop than it is revolutionary". Evan Rytlewski of The A.V. Club said that "not all of it works, but none of it is unpleasant, either", and commended Usher for branching out and taking risks. Pitchfork Media's Carrie Battan felt that his strength "lies in R&B, and he's adjusted well to shifting ground", although "not everything on Looking 4 Myself hits the mark". At USA Today, Steve Jones stated that on the release Usher has "chosen to keep growing and moving ahead" on which he "confidently steps out of his sonic comfort zone."

In a mixed review, Now writer Kevin Ritchie said that "Climax" is one of the only few stand-out tracks. Slant Magazine's Eric Henderson felt that the album lacks structure and found it "unavoidably uneven". Sarah Rodman of The Boston Globe criticized Usher's use of Auto-Tune: "the unnecessary deployment of Auto-tune on a singer who can actually hold his own vocally". The Observer's Killian Fox wrote that "for every hit—'Lemme See' is another—there are a couple of misses: 'Can't Stop Won't Stop', the Euro-dance opener produced by will.i.am, is horribly overblown".

On October 9, 2012, Looking 4 Myself earned Usher three nominations at the 2012 American Music Awards for Favorite Soul/R&B Male Artist, Favorite Pop/Rock Male Artist and Favorite Soul/R&B Album. On November 18, 2012, Usher won the award for Favorite Soul/R&B Male Artist for the third consecutive year. At the 55th Annual Grammy Awards, "Climax" earned Usher his eighth Grammy Award for Best R&B Performance. Billboard ranked Usher twentieth and sixty-second on their Hot 100 and Billboard 200 year-end charts, respectively.

== Commercial performance ==
Looking 4 Myself debuted at number one on the US Billboard 200 chart on the week ending June 17, 2012, selling 128,000 copies in its first week. The album marks Usher's fourth consecutive number one album. In its second week, the album dropped to number six on the chart, selling an additional 48,000 copies. In its third week, the album dropped to number nine on the chart, selling 36,000 more units. In its fourth week, the album dropped to number fifteen, and in its fifth week rose to number fourteen, selling 20,178 copies. As of October 2014, the album has sold 504,000 copies in the United States.

In the United Kingdom, the album debuted at number three on the UK Albums Chart, selling 27,000 units, giving Usher his fifth consecutive top-three album in the country. It sold sixteen units less than Amy MacDonald's third studio album Life in a Beautiful Light which debuted one place ahead at number 2. On August 21, 2015, the album was certified gold by the British Phonographic Industry (BPI), for sales of 100,000 copies.

In Australia, the album debuted at number three on the ARIA Albums Chart, giving Usher his fifth consecutive top-five album in the country. The album debuted at number fifteen on the Japanese Albums Chart, selling 6,727 copies, on the week ending June 17, 2012. It debuted at number four on the Dutch Albums Chart, and number five on the Swiss Albums Chart. In New Zealand, the album peaked at number eleven on the New Zealand Albums Chart, while only remaining on the chart for five weeks. In Canada, the album also debuted and peaked at number seven on the Canadian Albums Chart and Taiwan at number seven, in Germany at number eight and South Africa at number ten.

== Aftermath ==
Looking 4 Myself debuted with the smallest first-week figures since Usher's second studio album My Way (1997), which opened with 67,000 copies. The album's debut was a significant decrease relative to his previous effort Raymond v. Raymond (2010), which opened with 329,000 units. Gail Mitchell of Billboard contemplated on whether this was due to the pop material present on the album. Derrick Corbett, operator of urban based radio stations under Clear Channel Communications, credited its underwhelming sales to the "alienation" of Usher's core audience. Neke Howse of WKYS believes it is because of the music industry evolving, saying that both Usher and label mate Chris Brown—who also experienced lower first week sales with his fifth studio album Fortune—will "be fine, and their albums will do OK".

On August 2, 2012, Japanese multinational conglomerate Sony Group Corporation (which owns its American branch's music division and Usher's label, RCA Records) revealed their Q1 earnings for the year, with Looking 4 Myself largely contributing to the company's $92 million in revenue for the music sector. In an interview with singer-songwriter Eric Bellinger by Rap-Up, the former explained that he, along with Jermaine Dupri, Bryan-Michael Cox, and Brian Alexander Morgan, were working on Usher's next album. Bellinger compared the album's music to Usher's Confessions (2004), saying that it is "more R&B, more urban" than Usher's Looking 4 Myself. The latter declared that his next album would show that he is "still Usher". The singer's follow-up non-album single—"Good Kisser"—was released on May 5, 2014, through digital download.

== Track listing ==
Standard edition
No.	Title	Writer(s)	Producer(s)	Length
1.	"Can't Stop Won't Stop"	Will Adams; Keith Harris; Billy Joel	will.i.am; Harris	3:51
2.	"Scream"	Max Martin; Shellback; Savan Kotecha; Usher Raymond IV	Martin; Shellback	3:55
3.	"Climax"	Raymond IV; Thomas Pentz; Ariel Rechtshaid; Sean "Redd Stylez" Fenton	Diplo; Natural^{[a]}	3:53
4.	"I Care for U"	Nathaniel Hills; Raymond IV; Eric Bellinger; Juan Najera; Kevin Cossom; Marcella Araica	Danja; Natural^{[a]}	4:08
5.	"Show Me"	Hills; Cossom; Raymond IV; Araica	Danja; Natural^{[a]}; Cossom^{[a]}	3:43
6.	"Lemme See" (featuring Rick Ross)	James Scheffer; Daniel Morris; Nickolas Marzouca; Raymond IV; Bellinger; Lundon "Da Bridge" Knighten; William Roberts II	Jim Jonsin; Mr. Morris; Natural^{[a]}	4:13
7.	"Twisted" (featuring Pharrell Williams)	Raymond IV; Pharrell Williams	Pharrell; Natural^{[a]}	3:43
8.	"Dive"	Rico Love; James Scheffer; Morris; Frank Romano	Jonsin; Rico Love; Romano; Mr. Morris	3:47
9.	"What Happened to U"	Raymond IV; Bellinger; Noah Shebib; Sidney Brown; Sean Combs; Reginald Ellis; Norman Glover; Carl Thompson; Christopher Wallace	Noah "40" Shebib; Omen^{[b]}; Natural^{[a]}	4:22
10.	"Looking 4 Myself" (featuring Luke Steele)	Rico Love; Pierre Medor; Earl Hood; Eric Goudy II	Rico Love; Medor; Earl & E	4:12
11.	"Numb"	Raymond IV; Klas Åhlund; Steve Angello; Sebastian Ingrosso; Axel Hedfors; Alessandro Lindblad; Ryon Lovett; Terry Lewis	Swedish House Mafia; Alesso; Åhlund; Natural^{[a]}	3:46
12.	"Lessons for the Lover"	Rico Love; Medor; Hood; Goudy II	Rico Love; Medor; Earl & E	5:07
13.	"Sins of My Father"	Salaam Remi; Rico Love; Raymond IV; Lewis	Remi; Rico Love^{[b]}	3:56
14.	"Euphoria"	Raymond IV; Åhlund; Angello; Ingrosso; Hedfors; Lovett; Lewis; Najera	Swedish House Mafia; Natural^{[a]}	4:20
Total length:				56:56

Deluxe edition bonus tracks
No.	Title	Writer(s)	Producer(s)	Length
15.	"I.F.U."	Rico Love; Andrew "Pop" Wansel; Autoro "Toro" Whitfield; Ronald "Flippa" Colson	Pop Wansel; Rico Love; Autorowhit^{[b]}; Flippa123^{[b]}	4:02
16.	"Say the Words"	Raymond IV; Steele; Surahn "Sid" Sidhu	Steele; Surahn; Natural^{[a]}	4:01
17.	"2nd Round"	Raymond IV; Pentz; Rechtshaid; Najera	Diplo; Rechtshaid; Natural^{[a]}	3:22
18.	"Hot Thing" (featuring A$AP Rocky)	Raymond IV; Williams; Rakim Myers	Pharrell; Natural^{[a]}	3:27
Total length:				71:48

Notes

- ^{^a} signifies a vocal record producer.
- ^{^b} signifies a co-record producer.
- "Can't Stop Won't Stop" contains a portion of the composition "Uptown Girl" written by Billy Joel.
- "What Happened to U" contains a sample from "One More Chance/Stay with Me Remix" written by Sean Combs, Reginald Ellis, Norman Glover, Carl Thompson and Christopher Wallace, as performed by The Notorious B.I.G.

== Personnel ==
Credits for Looking 4 Myself adapted from AllMusic.

Managerial

- Usher Raymond IV – executive producer
- Mark Pitts – executive producer, A&R
- Mr. Morgan – management
- Kory Aaron – assistant
- Diego Avendaño – assistant
- Liz Bauer – assistant
- Delbert Bowers – assistant
- Nathan Burgess – assistant
- Thomas Cullison – assistant
- Jacob Dennis – assistant
- Alex Fremin – assistant
- Chris Galland – assistant
- Phil Joly – assistant
- Jaime Martinez – assistant
- Dana Richard – assistant
- Ramon Rivas – assistant
- Ed Sanders – assistant
- Max Unruh – assistant
- Jorge Velasco – assistant
- Randy Warnken – assistant
- Eric Weaver – assistant
- Matt Huber – assistant

Performance credits

- Usher Raymond IV – primary artist
- Rick Ross – featured artist
- Luke Steele – featured artist
- Rico Love – vocals
- Mashanda Huskey – vocals
- Max Martin – vocals (background)

Visuals and imagery

- Francesco Carrozzini – photography
- Curtis Smith – groomer
- Ron Croudy – art direction
- Frank Zuber – art direction
- David Royer – stylist
- Nicole Patterson – make-up

Instruments

- Andre Bowman – bass
- Jim Jonsin – keyboards
- Stephen Coleman – string arrangements
- Czech Film Orchestra – strings
- Vincent Henry – saxophone
- Pierre Medor – keyboards
- Daniel Morris – keyboards
- Nico Muhly – piano, string arrangements, strings
- Ariel Rechtshaid – keyboards
- Shellback – keyboards
- Salaam Remi – bass, drums, guitar, keyboards
- Frank Romano – guitar
- Aaron Spears – drums, percussion

Technical and production

- Klas Åhlund – instrumentation, record producer
- Axel Hedfors – instrumentation, producer
- Steve Angello – instrumentation, producer
- Keith Harris – instrumentation, producer
- Sebastian Ingrosso – instrumentation, producer
- Alessandro Lindblad – instrumentation, producer
- will.i.am – instrumentation, producer
- Marcella "Ms. Lago" Araica – mixing
- Kevin Cossom – vocal producer
- Shellback – producer, programming
- Eric Goudy II – drum programming
- Earl Hood – drum programming
- Frank Romano – producer
- Rico Love – producer
- Max Martin – producer
- Pierre Medor – producer
- Nickolas Marzouca – engineer, mixing
- Daniel Morris – programming
- Usher Raymond IV – liner notes
- Ariel Rechtshaid – synthesizer
- Andrew Coleman – arranger, digital editing, engineer
- Tom Coyne – mastering
- Diplo – producer
- Swedish House Mafia – producer
- Jim Jonsin – producer, programming
- Gleyder "Gee" Disla – engineer
- Mark "Exit" Goodchild – engineer
- John Hanes – engineer
- Matt Huber – engineer
- Sam Holland Såklart – engineer
- Phil Seaford – assistant engineer
- Dylan Dresdow – mixing
- Serban Ghenea – mixing
- Robert Marks – mixing
- Manny Marroquin – mixing
- Noel "Gadget" Campbell – mixing
- Salaam Remi – arranger, producer
- Noah Shebib – arranger, instrumentation, producer

== Charts ==
=== Weekly charts ===
Chart (2012)	Peak position
Australian Albums (ARIA)	3
Australian Urban Albums (ARIA)	1
Austrian Albums (Ö3 Austria)	29
Belgian Albums (Ultratop Flanders)	15
Belgian Albums (Ultratop Wallonia)	24
Canadian Albums (Billboard)	7
Danish Albums (Hitlisten)	12
Dutch Albums (Album Top 100)	4
French Albums (SNEP)	20
German Albums (Offizielle Top 100)	8
Irish Albums (IRMA)	11
Italian Albums (FIMI)	35
Japanese Albums (Oricon)	15
Mexican Albums (Top 100 Mexico)	97
New Zealand Albums (RMNZ)	11
Norwegian Albums (VG-lista)	28
Polish Albums (OLiS)	64
Scottish Albums (OCC)	11
South African Albums (RiSA)	10
South Korean Albums (Gaon Chart)	13
Scottish Albums (Official Charts)	11
Spanish Albums (Promusicae)	42
Swiss Albums (Schweizer Hitparade)	5
Taiwanese Albums (G-Music)	2
UK Albums (Official Charts)	3
UK Album Downloads (Official Charts)	1
UK R&B Albums (OCC)	1
US Billboard 200	1
US Top R&B/Hip Hop Albums (Billboard)	1

=== Year-end charts ===
Chart (2012)	Position
Australian Urban Albums (ARIA)	12
UK Albums (OCC)	127
US Billboard 200	64
US Top R&B/Hip-Hop Albums (Billboard)	10

Chart (2013)	Position
US Top R&B/Hip-Hop Albums (Billboard)	66

== Certifications ==
Region	Certification	Certified units/sales
Canada (Music Canada)	Gold	40,000^{‡}
United Kingdom (BPI)	Gold	100,000^{*}
United States (RIAA)	Platinum	1,000,000^{‡}
^{*} Sales figures based on certification alone.^{‡} Sales+streaming figures based on certification alone.

== Release history ==
Region	Date	Format	Label	Edition(s)
Australia	June 8, 2012	CD; digital download	Sony Music Entertainment	Standard; deluxe
Germany	June 8, 2012	CD; digital download	Sony Music Entertainment	Standard; deluxe
Belgium	June 8, 2012	CD; digital download	RCA Records	Standard; deluxe
Netherlands	June 8, 2012	CD; digital download	RCA Records	Standard; deluxe
New Zealand	June 8, 2012	CD; digital download	RCA Records	Standard; deluxe
Austria	June 8, 2012	Digital download	RCA Records	Standard; deluxe
Norway	June 8, 2012	Digital download	RCA Records	Standard; deluxe
Finland	June 11, 2012	Digital download	RCA Records	Standard; deluxe
Portugal	June 11, 2012	Digital download	RCA Records	Standard; deluxe
Sweden	June 11, 2012	Digital download	RCA Records	Standard; deluxe
Denmark	June 11, 2012	CD; digital download	RCA Records	Standard; deluxe
France	June 11, 2012	CD; digital download	RCA Records	Standard; deluxe
United Kingdom	June 11, 2012	CD; digital download	RCA Records	Standard; deluxe
Italy	June 12, 2012	CD; digital download	RCA Records	Standard; deluxe
United States	June 12, 2012	CD; digital download	RCA Records	Standard; deluxe
Mexico	June 12, 2012	Digital download	RCA Records	Standard; deluxe
Spain	June 12, 2012	Digital download	RCA Records	Standard; deluxe
Canada	June 12, 2012	CD; digital download	RCA Records	Sony Music Entertainment
Japan	June 13, 2012	CD	Deluxe	Sony Music Entertainment

== See also ==
- List of number-one albums of 2012 (U.S.)
- List of number-one R&B albums of 2012 (U.S.)
- List of UK R&B Chart number-one albums of 2012
- PBR&B
