= Can't Stop Won't Stop (Usher song) =

Song performed by Usher

Song by Usher

from the album Looking 4 Myself
- Recorded: 2012; Glenwood Place Studios (Burbank, California)
- Genre: Dance-pop; eurodance
- Length: 3:51
- Label: RCA
- Songwriter(s): Will Adams; Keith Harris; William M. Joel
- Producer(s): will.i.am; Keith Harris

"Can't Stop Won't Stop" is a song recorded by American recording artist Usher for his seventh studio album Looking 4 Myself (2012). Written and produced by Will "will.i.am" Adams and Keith Harris, the song contains an interpolation of the bridge to Billy Joel's 1983 hit single "Uptown Girl". Musically, "Can't Stop Won't Stop" is a eurodance and dance-pop song that incorporates elements of dubstep.

"Can't Stop Won't Stop" received generally mixed reviews from music critics, who praised the song's production, but dismissed its lyrics. Additionally, similarities between "Can't Stop Won't Stop" and Usher's 2010 single "OMG" were noted. Upon the release of Looking 4 Myself, the song debuted at number 22 on the South Korea Gaon International Chart, with sales of 9,374 digital copies.

== Background ==
"Can't Stop Won't Stop" was written by William M. Joel, Keith Harris and William Adams. The production of the song was helmed by Harris and Adams under his stage name will.i.am. Adams had previously written and produced Usher's 2010 single "OMG". "Can't Stop Won't Stop" contains a portion of Joel's single "Uptown Girl" (An Innocent Man, 1983). Mark "Exit" Goodchild recorded the song at Glenwood Place Studios in Burbank, while Jacob Dennis served as recording assistant. It was mixed by Dylan "3-D" Dresdow at Paper V.U. Studios North Hollywood with Jaime Martinez serving as a mixing assistant. The track's producers Harris and Adams provided the complete instrumentation of "Can't Stop Won't Stop".

== Composition ==
"Can't Stop Won't Stop"
A sample of "Can't Stop Won't Stop", a eurodance and pop-dance song that incorporates dubstep elements and uses "synth-heavy hook"

"Can't Stop Won't Stop" is a eurodance and pop-dance song that incorporates dubstep elements. According to Carrie Battan of Pitchfork Media, "even though the track opens builds like a throwaway Eurodance arena anthem, but instead of exploding into oblivion after the breakdown it splits into a fizzy and wonky slap of a beat." Ryan Hadfield of Time wrote that, "'Can't Stop Won't Stop' and 'Scream' are aggressively seductive club songs" and drew comparisons to Usher's single "Yeah!" (Confessions, 2004) and his collaboration with French disk jockey David Guetta entitled "Without You" (Nothing but the Beat, 2011). Jody Rosen writing for Slate argued the song has its foundations on a "pummeling 4/4 dance beat behind a synthesizer refrain borrowed from Billy Joel's "Uptown Girl"." Billboard's Erika Ramirez concluded that "Can't Stop Won't Stop" is built around "synth-heavy hook".

Lyrically, the track regards the subject of sex. It tries to be a club jam by asking the listener to turn the volume up, "on the off chance that the record reaches the antennae of an extraterrestrial", with its opening lines: "Hey what's up / This is a jam, turn it up / Play it loud in the club / This is fire, burning it up".Unterberger noted that the lines "I don't want to do all the normal things / That all these other normal dudes do" could be the inspiration for the title of the album and its "thesis statement", while Rosen thought they could also "be describing Usher's career trajectory". Ramirez was critical towards its "mediocre lyricism".

== Critical reception ==
"Can't Stop Won't Stop" received generally mixed reviews from music critics. Nathan S. of DJ Booth stated that "Can't Stop Won't Stop" would be shocking to a "My Way-era Usher", but "coming from a man who's [sic] last huge hit was OMG, it's really nothing new". Sobhi Youssef of Sputnikmusic praised the song's productions, but dismissed its "truly cliched lyrics". Erika Ramirez of Billboard stated that the song "simply sets the stage for better tracks to come". Eric Henderson of Slant Magazine wrote a negative review of the song, calling it "yet another dispiritingly hollow attempted revver-upper in the Pitbull/LMFAO mode". He also criticized the song's interpolation from "Uptown Girl." Killian Fox of The Guardian called the song "horribly overblown", while Trent of the Lava Lizard labelled the song as "forgettable".

Brad Wete of Complex disagreed, calling the song, along with "Lemme See", a "gem". Andrew Unterberger of Popdust called the song "not exactly single-worthy material", being "a hobbled-together bunch of musical cliches, where David Guetta stadium house beats meets Skrillex wub-wubs, like the brainchild of the most uncreative EDM think tank possible." According to Unterberger, the lyrics are "even more hackneyed", with its "Kardashian-worthy opening lines" Evan Rytlewski of The A.V. Club both "Can't Stop Won't Stop" and "Scream" as two "overinflated dance numbers" that open the album on a "discouragingly perfunctory note". He concluded by stating that: "If there's a bright spot to either, it's that they forgo the garish auto-tune of Usher's previous dance forays, so at least his whole register comes across cleanly."

== Credits and personnel ==
Recording and mixing

- Recorded at Glenwood Place Studios, Burbank, California; mixed at Paper V.U. Studios North Hollywood, California

Personnel

- Songwriting – William M. Joel, Keith Harris, William Adams
- Production – Keith Harris, will.i.am
- Mixing – Dylan "3-D" Dresdow
- Mixing assistant – Jaime Martinez
- Recording – Mark "Exit" Goodchild
- Recording assistants – Jacob Dennis
- Instrumentation – Keith Harris, will.i.am

Credits adapted from the liner notes of Looking 4 Myself, RCA Records.

== Chart ==
Upon the release of Looking 4 Myself, due to digital downloads "Can't Stop Won't Stop" debuted on the singles chart in South Korea. It debuted on the South Korea Gaon International Chart at number 22 on June 10, 2012, with sales of 9,374 digital copies. The next week, the song sold an additional 3,593 copies and fell to number 78.

Chart (2012)	Peak position
South Korea Gaon International Chart	22
