= Climax (song) =

Single by Usher

from the album Looking 4 Myself
- Released: February 22, 2012
- Studio: Jungle City Studios, NYC; Glenwood Place Studios, Burbank, CA; Silent Sound Studios, Atlanta, GA
- Genre: Electronica; quiet storm; alternative R&B
- Length: 3:53
- Label: RCA
- Songwriters: Usher Raymond IV; Thomas Pentz; Ariel Rechtshaid; Sean "Redd Stylez" Fenton
- Producers: Diplo; Ariel Rechtshaid; Johnny "Natural" Najera

Usher singles chronology
"Without You" (2011)	"Climax" (2012)	"Scream" (2012)

Music video
- "Climax" on YouTube

"Climax" is a song by American singer-songwriter Usher. It was released on February 22, 2012, by RCA Records as the lead single from his 2012 studio album Looking 4 Myself. The song was written by Usher, Ariel Rechtshaid, Redd Stylez, and Diplo, who also produced the song. Usher and Diplo worked on the song for two months as part of their collaboration for the former's album. The song is a quiet storm slow jam with electronic influences, and lyrics about the turning point of a relationship. According to Usher, the song is primarily about the complications of a relationship, despite the lyrics' sexual overtones.

As a single, "Climax" debuted at number 81 on the Billboard Hot 100, with 31,000 digital units sold in its first week. It peaked at number 17 and charted for 20 weeks, and also reached number one on the Billboard Hot R&B/Hip-Hop Songs, becoming Usher's 12th number-one single on the chart. "Climax" was received with widespread critical acclaim, who commended its musical direction, lyrics, Usher's singing, and Diplo's production. Rolling Stone and Entertainment Weekly named it one of the best singles of 2012. In 2013, "Climax" won Usher a Grammy Award for Best R&B Performance.

== Writing and recording ==
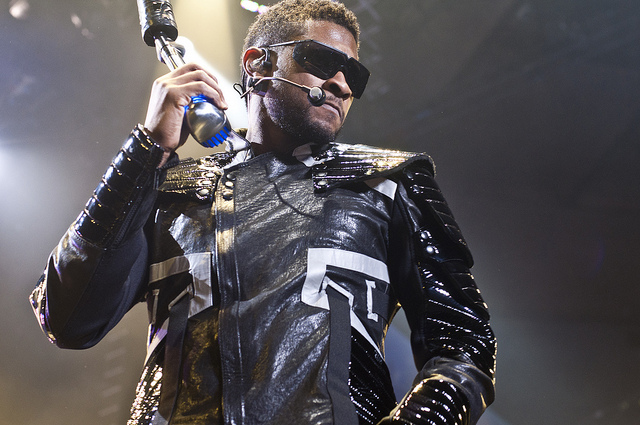
Usher in 2010

"Climax" was written by Usher, Redd Stylez, Ariel Rechtshaid, and Diplo, who also produced the song. Diplo introduced the song's concept to Usher, who was working with him on a new album. Usher wanted to expand his music's style and depth by working with Diplo. Diplo recounted the experience in an interview for The Guardian, saying that "I had explained to him about a moment I had with a girl where I felt like I could die with her and be content, but I didn't and life moved on, and that point in my life was over. It was a sad feeling but it was beautiful. He was relating with me about the idea and how many times you think things are perfect and feel that way but they can pass." They discussed the concept throughout the song's development and how it relates to Usher's life, as Diplo "tried to help realise these lyrics and feelings." After conceiving some melody lines, they wrote the song in about an hour.

Usher and Diplo worked on the song's production for two months, recording in studios in Los Angeles, New York, and Atlanta. Diplo originally pursued a house music sound based on a chord progression he wrote, but changed his direction after working in the recording studio alone on what he called a "wildfire" beat. He later said of his direction for the song, "the idea of pushing cut-off on a synth used so much in progressive house music but pulling back. I was making something like a minimal techno record with Atlanta strip clubs in mind." According to Diplo, Usher proposed the idea of "tak[ing] the strip club to the stadium" with the song's production. Classical music composer Nico Muhly contributed with the song's string arrangement.

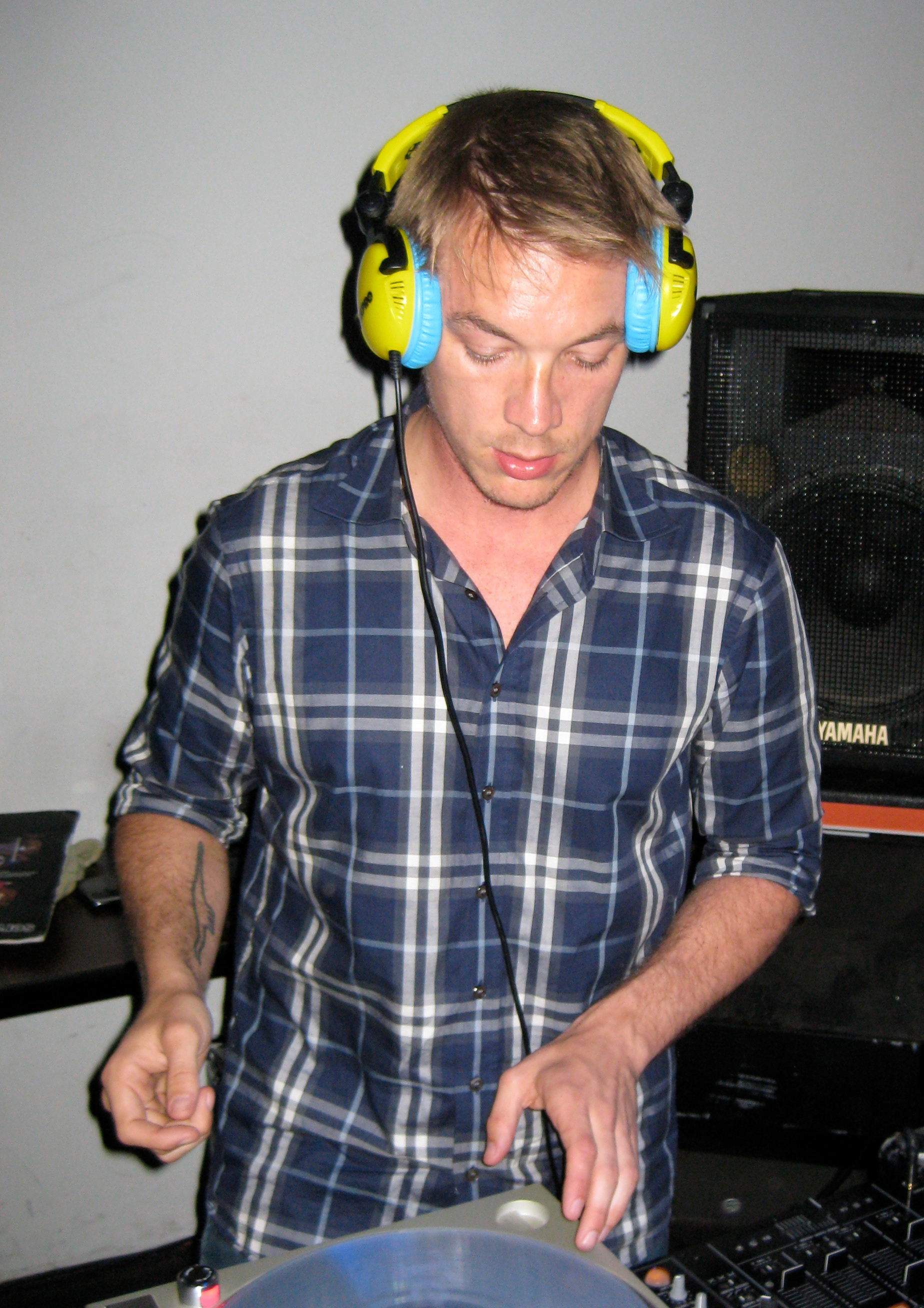
Diplo (2009), the song's producer and co-writer

In April 2020, Canadian R&B singer the Weeknd said in a cover story with Vanity Fair that "Climax" (and pop as a genre) was influenced by his debut mixtape, House of Balloons (2011). He stated, "I heard 'Climax' that [2012] Usher song, and was like, 'Holy [expletive], that's a Weeknd song'. It was very flattering, and I knew I was doing something right, but I also got angry. But the older I got, I realized it's a good thing". His comments sparked widespread debate online. Diplo posted a series of tweets soon after, praising House of Balloons and acknowledging its influence on his production for "Climax": "When I heard those early records [by the Weeknd] they blew my mind – soulful in their silences, and a spacey iconic voice that felt uniquely internet. the idea of R&B having dark edges was what I wanted to bring to @usher". He further reiterated it was a collaborative effort between himself, Usher, and the song's other producers. Usher responded indirectly via Twitter, writing: "Have you ever seen the moon bark back at the dog?". The Weeknd responded a shortly after on Twitter, saying he didn't mean any offense and was always inspired by Usher. He later told Esquire, "It wasn’t a feud. I hit him up to apologize and tell him that it was misconstrued. He’s one of the reasons why I make music. Definitely. No, no, I have nothing bad to say about Usher. The sweetest, most down-to-earth guy ever."

== Music and lyrics ==
"Climax"
A 23-second sample of "Climax", consisting of various electronic effects and other musical accompaniment.

"Climax" is set in common time. Diplo called the style "Radiohead quietstorm", and both Spin and Rolling Stone agreed that the song was a mix of quiet storm style, electronic music and alternative R&B. It is written in the key of C minor, and Usher's voice ranges from B♭_{2} to D_{5}. The music is built around a haunting riff, complemented by sparse drum machine and some musical accompaniment. Its varying soundscape incorporates electronic effects such as clicks, hisses, whooshes, and low-frequency synths, as well as subtle strings and scattered piano notes. Music writers have noted Diplo's production as uncharacteristically reserved and understated.

The song's musical structure is characterized by intervals in which the music builds to a potential break, but softly decrescendos instead. As each verse concludes, the song's snapping, electronic rhythm track gradually softens and rippling synth chords repeat throughout the song. Marc Hogan of Spin writes that Diplo "teases us with the sort of wubba-wubba subwoofer noises that have become inescapable in the past year or so of pop radio. But he never actually gives in with the full dubstep drop ... the song keeps swelling to one big wave after another, without ever really reaching a single, song-stopping crescendo." Hogan cites the bridge at around the three-minute mark as "the closest thing to a climax" on the song, "when the track gets as quiet as it ever has before becoming as lush as it ever gets." Pitchfork Media's Carrie Battan calls the song "an exercise in the power of restraint", commenting that "Diplo shows uncharacteristic subtlety behind Usher's sentiment, with a beat that seems to hang suspended in midair."

The song is a breakup lament dealing with the theme of commitment. Its title refers to the turning point of a relationship. The lyrics address a relationship in a state of tension and uncertainty: "We've reached the climax / We're together / Now we're undone / Won't commit so we choose to run away / Do we separate?" Usher sings in a pleading falsetto and a plaintive tone on the song, alternating restrained vocals and anguished howls. In an interview for V-103, Usher stressed that "Climax" focuses more on the complication of relationships rather than sex, saying that "it's really about the ultimate experience or lack thereof. Or the finale of an experience of love and life. When you're in a relationship and it has kinda reached the climax of where it can go, you gotta let it go if you are not going to commit." He viewed that his falsetto vocals and the song's tone give the song a sexual feel with music that works as a "double entendre".

== Release ==
The song was first released onto the internet on Valentine's Day 2012 through SoundCloud. Upon its release, Diplo commented on Twitter: "Seriously the best record I've been part of ... I'm pretty sure in 9 months there are gonna be a lot of new babies that this song is responsible for". It was released as the lead single for Usher's 2012 album Looking for Myself.

"Climax" debuted on the Billboard Hot 100 chart at number 81, with 31,000 digital units sold in the week of March 10, 2012. It peaked at number 17 and spent 20 weeks on the chart. The song also reached number one on the Billboard Hot R&B/Hip-Hop Songs, on which it charted for 33 weeks, and became Usher's 12th number-one single on the chart. It peaked at number three on the Dance/Club Play Songs, on which it charted for 13 weeks. In the United Kingdom, "Climax" debuted and peaked at number four on the UK Singles Chart, selling 41,617 units. It charted for seven weeks and peaked at number 29 in Australia.

== Critical reception ==
Professional ratings
Review scores
Source	Rating
Billboard	4.5/5 stars
NME	4/5 stars

"Climax" has received widespread acclaim from music critics, who have lauded it as one of Usher's best-written and best-produced songs, and named the 2012's best song by several magazines. In Rolling Stone, Jody Rosen gave the song four out of five stars and stated, "Quiet storm gets a freaky sci-fi makeover", while Will Hermes hailed it as "spring's best quiet-storm jam". FWRD writer Aiden Harmitt-Williams regarded its mix of quiet storm with EDM as "a genius move". Pitchfork journalist Carrie Battan deemed it "a doubly satisfying departure from [Usher and Diplo's] respective strains of club-ready fare." Jason Lipshutz of Billboard called the song "an ode to the bewildering thoughts and feelings of relationship purgatory" and wrote that it is "a sound that Usher should explore more often." Marc Hogan of Spin felt that the song is "as vividly communicative as it is decoratively beautiful" and praised its articulation, calling it "a tour de force of pacing and dynamics, giving listeners more and more, but then always easing up just enough to keep us begging for one more verse." Priya Elan of NME cited "Climax" as Usher's "best song in absolutely years" and stated, "Goodbye cringe factor, hello Diplo, subtle electronic nuances and an expectation-defying vocal performance which is more Prince falsetto than depth-free showman. The results are jaw dropping." He also compared it to the work of the Weeknd and commended its "lack of smut" in the lyrics, stating "it's just Usher playing it fast and loose in falsetto. The result is as subtle as it is unbelievable." Eric Arredondo of Beats Per Minute viewed the song as an improvement over Usher's 2010 album Raymond v. Raymond and addressed the comparisons to the Weeknd, writing that, "though it still doesn't hold much of the innovations and risks of something like The Weeknd's House of Balloons, 'Climax' can do something that most songs on that album can't do without losing most of their fun: be played on the radio."

Recently, a new wave of revisionist Love Men—Frank Ocean, The Weeknd—have given R&B a bleak, angsty overhaul. But Usher got there first, with less self-importance, and far punchier hooks. On "Climax" he throws down the gauntlet—firing his hair-raising falsetto at Ocean, The Weeknd, and other critics’ darlings.

— Jody Rosen on "Climax" for Slate magazine

== Accolades ==
Rolling Stone ranked "Climax" number 15 on their year-end best songs list for 2012. Entertainment Weekly ranked it number 14 on their year-end list of best singles. It was voted as the third best single of 2012 by The Village Voice's 40th annual Pazz & Jop critics' poll and the official best single of 2012 by Time magazine. At the 2013 Grammy Awards, "Climax" won Usher a Grammy Award for Best R&B Performance.

=== Year-end lists ===
Publication	Accolade	Rank
Billboard	20 Best Songs of 2012	1
Time	Top 10 Songs of 2012	1
Beats Per Minute	The Top Tracks of 2012	2
The Guardian	Best Tracks of 2012	2
Pazz & Jop	Single of the Year 2012	3
Pitchfork	The Top 100 Tracks of 2012	3
Said the Gramophone	Best Songs of 2012	4
Consequence of Sound	Top 50 Songs of 2012	5
Spin	40 Best Songs of 2012	11
Rolling Stone	50 Best Songs of 2012	15
Complex	The 50 Best Songs of 2012	16
Slant Magazine	The 25 Best Singles of 2012	20
Fact	The 100 Best Tracks of 2012	21
NPR	NPR Music's 100 Favorite Songs Of 2012	

== Music video ==
The music video for "Climax" was directed by Sam Pilling, filmed in Atlanta, and released on March 9, 2012. Director of photography was Adam Frisch. After filming, the video was given to the studio Surround for post-production, including editing its structure, title animation, and effects. The video shows Usher sitting in a car contemplating on whether to go inside his ex-girlfriend's home and rekindle their once-passionate sex or leave and never return again. It shows different scenarios played out in Usher's mind, including him confronting his ex-girlfriend's new boyfriend with a gun.

In the video, Usher sits in a car outside a house where his ex-girlfriend is being intimate with another man. He pulls a gun out of his glove compartment and agonizes over whether or not to enter the house. After ruminating over the different scenarios, Usher drives off at the end of the video. Jason Lipshut of Billboard found the "narrative arc" for the video to be "a bit perplexing". Jeff Lapointe of MTV News viewed that it "depicts the darker side of human nature as Usher drives up to his girlfriend/ex-girlfriends house to discover another vehicle, another man, another side of his love. In the realization of fury and anger, images distort Usher's reality with thoughts of taking his gun and shooting the intruder. Thoughts of running away with the girl. Thoughts of driving off to never be seen." The music video on YouTube has received over 110 million views as of May 2024.

== Live performances ==
Usher first performed the song on the show "Off-Broadway's 'Fuerza Bruta'". In the show, he entered from the dark in a white suit and black tie, and walked across a conveyor belt in beat to "Climax". As the song's tempo increased, he clutched his stomach as a gunshot fired and blood spread across his torso. Usher appeared on Saturday Night Live on May 12, 2012, to perform "Scream" and "Climax".

== Personnel ==
Credits are adapted from Tidal.

- Usher – vocals, lyricist
- Diplo – production
- Natural – vocal production, arrangement
- Ariel Rechtshaid – production, synthesizers, keyboards, lyricist
- Sean "Redd Stylez" Fenton lyricist
- Nico Muhly – piano, strings, string arrangement
- Mark "Exit" Goodchild – recording
- Ramon Rivas – recording assistance
- Kory Aaron – recording assistance
- Jorge Velasco – recording assistance
- Jacob Dennis – recording assistance
- Manny Marroquin – mixing
- Chris Galland – mixing assistance
- Delbert Bowers – mixing assistance

== Charts ==
=== Weekly charts ===
Chart (2012)	Peak position
Australia (ARIA)	29
Australia Urban (ARIA)	15
Austria (Ö3 Austria Top 40)	44
Belgium (Ultratip Flanders)	4
Belgium (Ultratip Wallonia)	6
Canada (Canadian Hot 100)	96
Denmark (Tracklisten)	39
Ireland (IRMA)	39
Lebanon (The Official Lebanese Top 20)	15
Netherlands (Mega Single Top 100)	82
Nigeria (Media Forest)	161
Scotland (Official Charts Company)	9
South Korea (Gaon Chart)	5
UK R&B (Official Charts Company)	1
UK Singles (Official Charts Company)	4
US Billboard Hot 100	17
US Hot Dance Club Songs (Billboard)	3
US Hot R&B/Hip-Hop Songs (Billboard)	1
US Pop Songs (Billboard)	36
US Rhythmic Airplay (Billboard)	6

=== Year-end charts ===
Chart (2012)	Position
South Korea (Gaon Chart)	100
UK Singles (Official Charts Company)	155
US Adult R&B Songs (Billboard)	11
US Billboard Hot 100	72
US Hot Dance Club Songs (Billboard)	45
US Hot R&B/Hip-Hop Songs (Billboard)	2
US Rhythmic (Billboard)	43

=== Decade-end charts ===
Chart (2010–2019)	Position
US Hot R&B/Hip-Hop Songs (Billboard)	25

== Certifications ==
Region	Certification	Certified units/sales
Australia (ARIA)	Platinum	70,000^{‡}
Canada (Music Canada)	Gold	40,000^{‡}
New Zealand (RMNZ)	Gold	7,500^{*}
United Kingdom (BPI)	Silver	200,000^{‡}
United States (RIAA)	3× Platinum	3,000,000^{‡}
^{*} Sales figures based on certification alone.^{‡} Sales+streaming figures based on certification alone.

== Release history ==
Country	Date	Format (Version)	Label
United States	February 21, 2012	Urban radio	RCA Records
Worldwide	February 22, 2012	Digital download	RCA Records
United States	March 13, 2012	Mainstream radio	RCA Records
United Kingdom	April 8, 2012	Digital download	RCA Records

== See also ==
- List of number-one R&B/hip-hop songs of 2012 (U.S.)
