= International Orange Chorale of San Francisco =

The International Orange Chorale of San Francisco (IOCSF) is an auditioned all-volunteer chamber choir devoted to performing established repertoire of all periods, with particular attention to 20th-century music—including newly commissioned works of promising composers. Since its inception, the group has been committed to performing free concerts featuring challenging and imaginative choral a cappella programming. The ensemble is based in San Francisco.

== Origins and management ==
The group was founded in 2003 by Jeremy Faust, Elaine Robertson and Cole Thomason-Redus and continued under the direction of Jeremy Faust. Several IOCSF members have conducted selected pieces. In 2007, after having conducted several pieces each season as a member of the group in 2006 and 2005, Paul Kim joined Jeremy Faust as co-director. During the 2007-2008 season, choir member Zane Fiala also conducted several pieces; Fiala became co-director as of the 2008/2009 season, joining Faust upon Kim's departure from the San Francisco Bay Area. Fiala now directs and conducts the group, while Faust maintains a role as Director of Artistic Outreach.

The ensemble is named after International orange, the official color of the Golden Gate Bridge

== Publishing, premieres and other programming ==
In 2011, IOCSF launched a new choral music publishing series partnership with Santa Barbara Music Publishing, with the release of "Peace," by Aaron Pike. Additionally, several of the compositions listed below have been published by Santa Barbara Music Publishing, G. Schirmer, and Hal Leonard after IOCSF premiered the works.

=== World premieres/commissions ===
Title of Work	Composer	When Premiered
Nigra Sum	Cole Thomason-Redus	Spring 2004
Concord Hymn	Jeremy Samuel Faust	Spring 2004
De Profundis	Georgia Stitt	Spring 2004
Cors de Chasses	Sarah George	Spring 2005
One, Two, Three	Elizabeth Baker	Spring 2006
Alma Redemptoris Mater	Jason Bush	Spring 2007
Croyez-vous	Jeremy Samuel Faust	Spring 2007
A Beautiful Day	Jason Bush	Spring 2008
Leaves are Falling	Jason Bush	Fall 2008
Atah Echad	Jeremy Samuel Faust	Spring 2008
Joyful Noise	Georgia Stitt	Spring 2009
Es la mañana llena	Zane Fiala	Spring 2009
Kyrie	Eric Tamm	Spring 2009
"Why do I Love" You, Sir (from Faith Disquiet)	Jake Heggie	Spring 2009
What if I say I shall not wait! (from Faith Disquiet)	Jake Heggie	Spring 2009
Once More to Gloriana	Jake Heggie (arr. J.S. Faust)	Spring 2009
What the Gray-Winged Fairy Said	Jake Heggie (arr. Z. Fiala)	Spring 2009
Death of a Ball-Turret Gunner	Shaffer McGee	Fall 2009
The Breath of Night	Shaffer McGee	Spring 2010
Gentle lady do not sing	Nicholas Boland	Spring 2010
The Bird of Night	Shaffer McGee	Spring 2010
Peace	Aaron Pike	Spring 2010
Ave Verum Corpus	Robert Chastain	Fall 2010
Gentle Lady, Do Not Sing	Nicholas Boland	Fall 2010
The Moment	Jed Bogan	Fall 2010
A Vision	Noah Luna	Fall 2010
In Memoriam	Harry Whitney	Fall 2010
Presence	David Harris	Fall 2010
i am a little church	Joshua Saulle	Fall 2010
Music for the Mass (a cappella as written by composer)	Milton Babbitt	Fall 2010
Månskenskväll	M.E. Valverde	Spring 2011
Alleluia	Aaron Pike	Spring 2011
Deeper Than All Roses	Nicholas Weininger	Spring 2011
Issa (Selected Movements)	Jeremy Faust	Spring 2011
Snow having melted (from ISSA)	Jeremy Samuel Faust	Fall 2011
First snowfall (from ISSA)	Jeremy Samuel Faust	Fall 2011
it may not always be so; and i say	Nicholas Weininger	Fall 2011
Ave	Vasken Ohanian	Spring 2012
Come, Heavy Sleep	David Gottlieb	Spring 2012
Oracle of Spring	M.E. Valverde	Spring 2012
We Sat Down and Wept	Elliott Encarnación	Spring 2012
Fly away I	Caroline Shaw	Spring 2012
Sonnet	Daniel Kohane	Spring 2012
Cosmos	Zane Fiala	Spring 2012
Chrysopylae	Dominick DiOrio	Spring 2012
Facing West	David Conte	Spring 2012
Ave Maria	Joshua Saulle	Fall 2012
Rise up, my love, my fair one	Nicholas Weininger	Fall 2012
We Sat Down and Wept	Elliot James Encarnacion	Fall 2012
The Unknown Region	Elizabeth Kimble	Spring 2013
Unremembered (Choral Arrangement)	Sarah Kirkland Snider	Spring 2013
Paanyaya 3	Robin Estrada	Fall 2013
into the wind	Jeremy Samuel Faust	Fall 2014
The Lamp	Nicholas Weininger	Fall 2014
Lord Heare my Prayer Instantly	Nico Muhly	Fall 2014
Parus	Nicholas Weininger	Spring 2015
The Threads Beneath	Marielle Jakobson	Spring 2015
Adam Lay Ybowndyn	Jeremy Samuel Faust	Fall 2015
De Profundis	Nicholas Weininger	Fall 2015
Missa Brevis	Fredrik Sixten	Fall 2015
Amen	Matt Boehler	Spring 2016
God gazed down on you from Heaven	Rhett Jaramillo	Spring 2016
As kingfishers catch fire	Nicholas Weininger	Spring 2016
In the Distant Sky	Huang Ruo	Spring 2016
Into the Golden Vessel of Great Song	Nicholas Weininger	Fall 2016
Strings in the earth and air	Bryan Lin	Spring 2017
Elohim Hashiveinu	Salvatore LoCascio	Spring 2017
The Peace of Wild Things	Elizabeth Kimble	Spring 2017
The Mariner	Elliott Encarnación	Spring 2017
Dream Triptych	Elliott Encarnación	Fall 2017
Give Me Your Tired, Your Poor	Nicholas Weininger	Spring 2018
Winter Ride	M.E. Valverde	Fall 2018
Go Ahead	Nathan Hall	Fall 2018
O Child	Michael T Roberts	Fall 2018
love is a place	Jonathan Posthuma	Fall 2018
Aire de Nocturno - Te Puse Collares	Robin Estrada	Spring 2019
Usahay (new arrangement)	Gregorio Responso Labja (Arr. Estrada)	Fall 2019
Zoom	Michael T Roberts	Summer 2020
Come to Us in Water	Michael T Roberts	Fall 2021
it's just weather	Bryan Lin	Fall 2021
Final Notations	Sam Maurer	Fall 2021
Variation on the Word Sleep	Sam Maurer	Fall 2022

=== American/regional premieres ===
Title of Work	Composer	When Premiered
There is no Rose of such Vertu	Fredrik Sixten	Spring 2012
Credo from Missa Regensis	Uģis Prauliņš	Spring 2012
Fayrfax Carol	Thomas Ades	Spring 2012
Alleluia	Algirdas Martinaitis	Spring 2012
Faith Disquiet	Jake Heggie	Spring 2012
Missa Rigensis	Ugis Praulinš	Fall 2012 - Spring 2014
Unremembered	Sarah Kirkland Snyder	Fall 2013
Kyrie (from Missa Pro Pace)	Kentaro Sato	Fall 2013
Gloria (from Missa Pro Pace)	Kentaro Sato	Fall 2013
Psalm 137	Jack Body	Fall 2013
Dogalen a Mabaso	Nilo Alcala	Fall 2013
Summer Shower	Kenji Oh	Spring 2015
Psalm 23	Josh Stoddard	Fall 2015
Veni (from Maranatha)	Georg Grün	Fall 2015
Ne Irascaris Domine	Frank La Rocca	Spring 2017
Pater Noster	Ivo Antognini	Spring 2017
Arise, My Love, My Fair One	Joshua Saulle	Spring 2017
Love, thricewise	Joseph Gregorio	Spring 2017
O Euchari Columba	David Avshalomov	Spring 2017
The Marriage of Heaven & Hell No.1 the Sick Rose	Bo Holten	Fall 2018
Turing believes machines think	Gordon Hamilton	Fall 2018
Tread Softly	Frank La Rocca	Fall 2018
Music to Hear	Mike Sheppard	Fall 2018
Birds of the Psalms 10. Psalm 91 Beauty Flows...	Patricia Van Ness	Fall 2018
Cloths of Heaven	Stacy Garrop	Fall 2018
Glong-ngo Ko	Excelsis Betil-Viña	Fall 2019
Aba Po, Santa Mariang Reyna	Ryan Cayabyab	Fall 2019
Ama namin	Fidel Calalang	Fall 2019
Juan 14	Mary Katherine Trangco	Fall 2019
Tetabeuhan	Slamet Abdul Sjukur	Fall 2019
I Flow...I Am	Mari Esabel Valverde	Fall 2021
Sapphic Fragments: Meditations on Queer Histories and Imaginaries	Soren Austenfeld	Fall 2021
Stop this day and night with me	Jake Heggie	Fall 2021
Pieces of My Heart	Lauren Bydalek	Fall 2021
Spiritus Mundi	Dale Trumbore	Fall 2021
Can You See?	Zanaida Robles	Fall 2021
Messiahs: False and True	Rex Isenberg	Spring 2022

=== Other repertory highlights ===
1. Frank Martin: Mass for Two Choirs
2. Herbert Howells: Requiem
3. Claude Debussy: Trois Chansons D'Orleans
4. Paul Hindemith: Six Chansons de Rilke
5. Ralph Vaughan Williams: Three Shakespeare Songs
6. Matthew Harris: Shakespeare Songs
7. Gustav Holst: Tomorrow Shall Be My Dancing Day
8. Gustav Holst: O Spiritual Pilgrim
9. Benjamin Britten: Ad Majorem Dei Gloriam
10. Otto Olsson: Ave Maris Stella
11. Alberto Grau: Kasar mie la gaji
12. Johannes Brahms: Op. 74, Nos. 1, 2 "Warum ist das Licht gegeben?"; "O Heiland reiß"
13. Johannes Brahms: Op. 109, No. 2. "Wenn ein starker Gewappneter"
14. Johannes Brahms: Liebeslieder Waltzes
15. Johann Sebastian Bach: "Ich lasse dicht nicht, du segnest mich denn"
16. Hugo Distler: Singet dem Herrn ein neues lied
17. William Henry Harris: Faire is the Heaven
18. Samuel Barber: The Reincarnations
19. Samuel Barber: Heaven Haven
20. Samuel Barber: To be sung on the Water
21. Olivier Messiaen: O Sacrum Convivium
22. Francis Poulenc: Four Motes for Noel
23. Maurice Durufle: Four Gregorian Motets
24. Sven-David Sandström: A New Heaven ("En Ny Himmel")
25. Jānis Peters: Kalējs kala debesīs
26. David Conte: Ave Maria
27. Steven Paulus: The Road Home
28. Emma Lou Diemer: Verses from the Rubaiyat
29. Robin Estrada: Awit sa Panginoon
30. Halsey Stevens: Go Lovely Rose
31. Joseph Gregorio: Dona Nobis Pacem

=== Other collaborations/assistance ===
- On June 2, 2023, IOCSF and Chanticleer performed at the Chorus America conference.
- On June 11, 2011, IOCSF and Volti performed the closing concert at the Chorus America conference.
- On June 10, 2011, IOCSF collaborated with Ragnar Bohlin on two sessions at the Chorus America conference. IOCSF served as the choir for the Conducting Masterclass taught by Bohlin. IOCSF also served as the choir for the session demonstrating new Scandinavian repertoire.
- On January 24, 2010, IOCSF joined the San Francisco Boys Chorus, mezzo-soprano Frederica von Stade, mezzo-soprano Zheng Cao, the San Francisco Opera Chorus and other performers in a relief concert for victims of the recent earthquake in Haiti.
- In January 2009, IOCSF joined the Yale Glee Club in performing at Grace Cathedral in San Francisco.
- July 28, 2008, marked IOCSF's first instrumental collaboration (if you exclude the egg shaker during the South American program). The ensemble performed as part of the Noontime Concert Series at Old St. Mary's with San Francisco piano duo Patricia and Vera Purcell. Program selections included Brahms Liebeslider Waltzes, as well as New York: Night (by Jeremy Faust and opera librettist Philip Littell).
- IOC has received guest coaching from the following experts:
  - Vance George: former choral director of the Grammy-winning San Francisco Symphony Chorus
  - Magen Solomon: Artistic Director of San Francisco Choral Artists
  - Joe Jennings: then Artistic Director of Chanticleer
  - Ian Robertson: Director of the San Francisco Opera Chorus and also of the San Francisco Boys Chorus
  - Patricia Kristof Moy: French coach for the San Francisco Opera
  - Jimmy Kansau: San Francisco Opera
  - Ragnar Bohlin: Chorus Director, San Francisco Symphony Chorus
  - Joshua Habermann: Director, Dallas Symphony Chorus; Music Director, Santa Fe Desert Chorale

== Awards, reviews ==
- ASCAP "Adventurous Programming" Award 2011, received at Chorus America conference
- San Francisco Classical Voice review of June 17, 2011 concert
- San Francisco Classical Voice review of May 1, 2009 concert
