= Pacific Boychoir =

The Pacific Boychoir was formed in 1998 with 6 boys, and it now includes more than 175 singers from ages 4 to 18. The New York Times said the PBA goes “beyond the reach of most youth choirs” and the Los Angeles Times described the PBA quality of sound and musicianship as “astonishing.”

In 2025, allegations of grooming and sexual abuse by founder Kevin Fox were brought up by numerous former students. These students brought up a lawsuit that is currently ongoing.

The PBA has appeared frequently with the San Francisco Symphony, performing under the direction of Michael Tilson Thomas, Kurt Masur, Robert Spano, David Robertson, Andy Brown, James Conlon, Charles Dutoit, Herbert Blomstedt, and Vance George, performing works by Beethoven, Britten, Orff, Wagner, Mahler, Liszt, Mendelssohn, and Berlioz. Along with the San Francisco Girls Chorus, the PBA recorded Gustav Mahler's Symphony No. 3 with the SFS, which won the Grammy Award for Best Classical Album in 2004. In January 2010, the San Francisco Symphony recording of Gustav Mahler's Symphony No. 8, featuring the San Francisco Symphony Chorus, the San Francisco Girls Chorus, and the PBA, was awarded Grammy Awards for Best Choral Performance and Best Classical Album.

The success of the chorus led to the formation in 2004 of the Pacific Boychoir Academy, the only full-time boys' chorus school on the west coast of North America. The choir school integrates a full academic curriculum with daily musical instruction for boys in grades 4-8. The choir school students learn sightreading, music theory and repertoire, as well as Math, English, History, Science, Art, PE, and Languages. The choir school has one of the lowest student:teacher ratios for independent schools in the Bay Area, and is a member of the East Bay Independent Schools Association (EBISA).

The chorus is divided into multiple groups: three training groups, two performing groups, and two groups for older boys whose voices have begun to change. The after school choirs rehearse up to four hours per week, and the day school choristers rehearse up to 15 hours per week.

The PBA has performed at venues such as Davies Symphony Hall, Dorothy Chandler Pavilion in Los Angeles, the War Memorial Opera House in San Francisco, St. Peter's Basilica in Vatican City, the Shanghai Oriental Arts Center, Basilica San Marco in Venice, Notre Dame Cathedral in Paris, Teatro Polyteama in Jundiai Brasil, Dvorak Hall in Prague, Jackson Hall at the Mondavi Center in Davis California, Herbst Theater in San Francisco, the Forbidden City Concert Hall in Beijing, Chartres Cathedral, Linder Auditorium in Johannesburg, Sala São Paulo, Teatro Municipal in Rio de Janeiro, Zellerbach Hall in Berkeley, Yoshi's (jazz club), on Public Radio International (PRI), on Danish National Radio, at Grace Cathedral, at professional sporting events, and also has several self-produced concerts annually. In 2007, the PBA presented the first performances of Rachmaninoff's Vespers (originally written for boys choir) by an American boys choir.

Choirs from the PBA have performed in California, Arizona, New Mexico, Hawaii, Kentucky, Washington, Oregon, Washington, D.C., Maryland, Florida, Georgia, and Alabama, and have traveled to France, Germany, the Czech Republic, China, Lithuania, Hungary, Latvia, Russia, Estonia, Australia, New Zealand, Argentina, South Africa, Peru, and Brazil. They have multiple CDs, a live CD, Christmas music by Benjamin Britten, two spirituals CDs, and a recording of two of Bach's "Lutheran Masses". They have sung with the San Francisco Symphony, the Moscow Chamber Orchestra, American Bach Soloists, Lithuanian State Orchestra, Marcus Shelby Jazz Orchestra, The Berkeley Symphony, the orchestras of UC Berkeley and UC Davis, as well as with several top boy's choirs around the world, including the Vienna Boys' Choir and the Drakensberg Boys Choir.

The PBA has also performed with comedian Zach Galifianakis, is the voice of the Yahoo! yodel, has sung for the Chabad Telethon, performs dozens of free school performances every year, and published quite possibly the first ever choir tour blog, in July 2001

The Founding Music Director is Kevin Fox, who sings with the American Bach Soloists and the Grace Cathedral Choir of Men and Boys.
