= Jacob Mühlrad =

Swedish composer (born 1991)

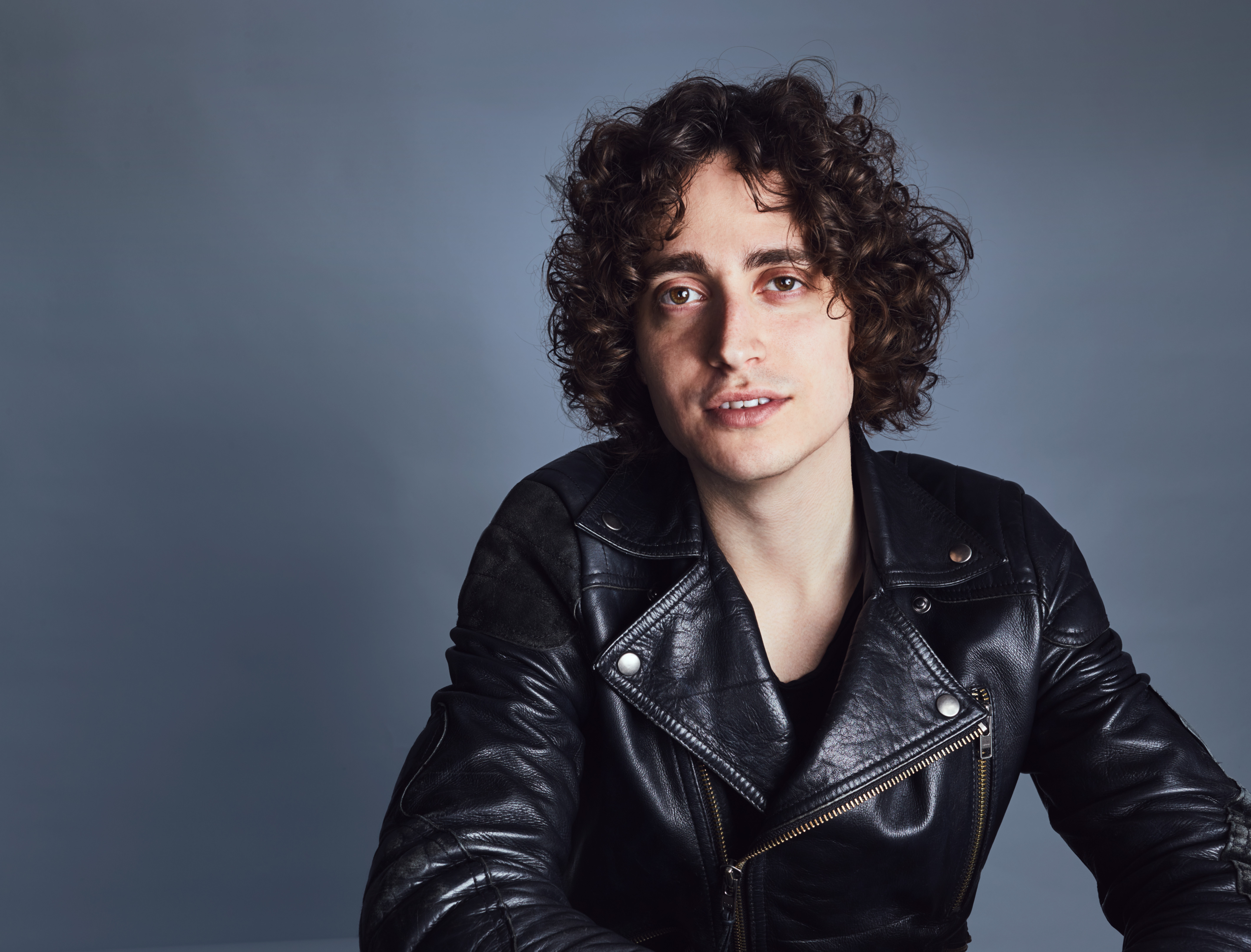
- Photo by Pierre Björk, 2017
- Born: 9 April 1991 (age 35); Stockholm, Sweden
- Education: Royal College of Music
- Occupation: Composer
- Website: www.jacobmuhlrad.com

Jacob Benjamin Mühlrad (born 9 April 1991) is a Swedish composer who has worked with prominent choirs and orchestras across the world. He has also collaborated with pop music acts and produced film music. Mühlrad's modern classical works have been performed at the Carnegie Hall in New York City, Victoria Hall in Singapore, the Orpheum in Vancouver, the Norwegian Opera, and the National Portrait Gallery in London.

His piece Anim Zemirot (composed in 2013 and released by Deutsche Grammophon in 2021) is today a staple in the repertoire of European choirs. In 2015, Mühlrad as a 24-year-old became the youngest composer to have a piece performed at the Royal Swedish Opera. He has since been labeled a "rising star" by The Economist and garnered a top rating by BBC Music Magazine for his debut album Time.

Mühlrad has partnered with musicians such as Pablo Heras-Casado, Olga Neuwirth, Martin Fröst, and Peter Dijkstra, and ensembles including the Royal Stockholm Philharmonics, Tokyo Symphony Orchestra, WDR Rundfunkchor Köln and Vancouver Chamber Choir, on the classical side.

As a pop composer, he has done various collaborations with the Swedish House Mafia, including the One Symphony, a symphonic version of the electronic music super group's hit song.

Mühlrad is from a Jewish family and three of his grandparents were survivors of the Holocaust. He is inspired by Jewish cultural elements in his musical work, as well as by various other cultures across all parts of the world.

In his native Sweden, Mühlrad has emerged as a fashion icon, earning the title 'Sweden's best-dressed man' by Elle in 2019.

== Early life and education ==
Mühlrad started with music when he was 15 years old and found an old broken synth and started to improvise with it. As a result of severe dyslexia, he initially had difficulties learning how to read and write sheet music. He studied music under Sven-David Sandström and Djuro Zivkovic, and then went on to the Royal College of Music in Stockholm and has a master's degree from the Royal College of Music in London.

== Career ==
In 2014, Mühlrad performed collaborative and experimental concert Through and Through, with Swedish contemporary artist Andreas Emenius, at R1 Reaktorhallen in Stockholm.

In 2016, Mühlrad made his Carnegie Hall debut with his work "Pan", inspired by the god in Greek mythology with the same name.

As the grandchild of a Holocaust survivor, he was awarded a scholarship from Micael Bindefeld's Foundation in memory of the Holocaust ($33 000) on the International Holocaust Remembrance Day in 2017. The scholarship funded the production for an a cappella choir piece with the Radio Choir and Eva Dahlgren based on his grandfather, Michael Bliman's, experiences in Auschwitz and Bergen-Belsen.

Over the course of his career so far, Mühlrad has produced various works leading Swedish musical institutions, including Berwaldhallen, the Swedish Radio Choir, the Royal Stockholm Philharmonic Orchestra, Swedish Radio Symphony Orchestra, and the Royal Dramatic Theatre.

Mühlrad is also a co-composer on rapper Silvana Imam's Swedish Grammy nominated album "Naturkraft" (2016).

In 2018, it was announced that Mühlrad was producing a piece that was co-commissioned by several of Europe's most prominent choirs: the Radio Choir in Cologne, Cappella San Francisco, Tapiola Chamber Choir in Espoo, Finland, and the Swedish Radio Choir.

In 2019, it was confirmed that Mühlrad would be composing an orchestral interpretation of One (Your Name) by the Swedish House Mafia for the trio's comeback tour which is starting with three Stockholm shows in May. The piece, entitled "One Symphony", was released globally on 1 January 2022.

In 2021, Mühlrad premiered his first orchestral piece, REMS (Rapid Eye Movement Sleep), which was commissioned by the Royal Stockholm

Mühlrad composed the soundtrack for the film Burn All My Letters, released as an album in 2022 and an solo piano EP in 2023 by Warner Classics, based on the film adaptation of Alex Schulmans bestselling novel, which explores themes of love, trauma, and memory across generations.

His 2022 choir piece Ay Li Lu was inspired by a Jiddisch lullaby and was co-commissioned by the Vancouver Chamber Choir, Vox Chamber Choir in Pretoria, SYC Ensemble Singers in Singapore and Kampin Laulu in Helsinki.

In October 2024, a composition by Mühlrad premiered at Malmö Concert Hall, featuring a robot cellist performing alongside the Malmö Symphony Orchestra for the first time in music history. In December 2024, Mühlrad collaborated with DJ & producer Anyma and visual artist Alexander Wessely to integrate the compositions for robotic cellists into the show ”Afterlife presents Anyma: The End of Genesys” at the Sphere in Las Vegas.

In February 2025, Jacob Mühlrad’s composition Heliopauses premiered at Festival Présences, hosted by Radio France, alongside works by composers such as Olga Neuwirth.
