= David Conte =

American composer (born 1955)

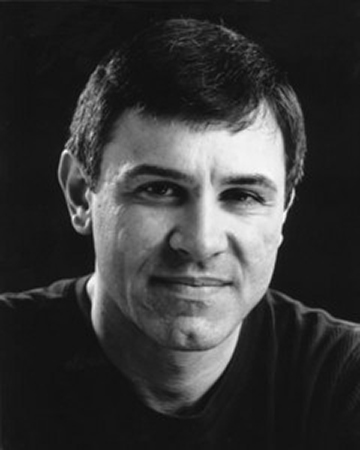
- Conte in 2010
- Born: December 20, 1955; Denver, Colorado, U.S.
- Education: Bowling Green State University Cornell University
- Occupation: Composer
- Website: www.davidconte.net

David Conte (born December 20, 1955) is an American composer who has written over 150 works published by E.C. Schirmer (a division of ECS Publishing), including six operas, a musical, works for chorus, solo voice, orchestra, chamber music, organ, piano, guitar, and harp. Conte has received commissions from Chanticleer, the Oakland Symphony, Dayton Philharmonic, Stockton Symphony, the Atlantic Classical Orchestra, the San Francisco Symphony Chorus, Harvard University Chorus, the Men's Glee Clubs of Cornell University and the University of Notre Dame, GALA Choruses from the cities of San Francisco, New York, Boston, Atlanta, Seattle, and Washington, D.C., the American Guild of Organists (2004, 2009, 2014, 2024, 2025), Sonoma City Opera, and the Gerbode Foundation (for his opera America Tropical). He was honored with the American Choral Directors Association (ACDA) Brock Commission in 2007 for his work The Nine Muses, and in 2016 he won the National Association of Teachers of Singing (NATS) Art Song Composition Award for his work American Death Ballads. In 2024, he was named "Composer of the Year" by the American Guild of Organists.

== Education and career ==
Conte attended public schools in Lakewood, Ohio, a suburb of Cleveland. His earliest musical experiences were attending rehearsals of Robert Shaw’s Cleveland Orchestra Chorus, of which his mother Nancy was a member, and singing in the doo-wop vocal group Shameful and the Seven Sinners. Conte earned his bachelor's degree from Bowling Green State University, where he studied with Wallace DePue, and his master’s and doctoral degrees from Cornell University, where he studied with Karel Husa, Steven Stucky, and Robert Moffat Palmer. From 1975 to 1978, he studied with Nadia Boulanger in Paris and Fontainebleau, where he was one of her last students.

Conte has been honored as a Fulbright scholar in Paris, a Ralph Vaughan Williams Fellow and an Aspen Music Festival Conducting Fellow. He has served on the faculties of Cornell, Colgate University, Keuka College, and the Interlochen Center for the Arts. While at Cornell, he served as both the assistant director and acting director of the Cornell University Glee Club, for whom he composed numerous works. Since 1985, Conte has been Professor of Composition at the San Francisco Conservatory of Music. From 2000 to 2014, he was conductor of the Conservatory Chorus, and in 2014, he was appointed Chair of the Composition Department. He served as Composer-in-Residence with the theater company Thick Description from 1991 to 2008, for whom he composed two chamber operas: Firebird Motel (2003; David Yezzi librettist) and America Tropical (2007; Oliver Mayer, librettist). In 1991 he served on the faculty of the American Conservatory in Fontainebleau, France (Fontainebleau Schools). Conte served on the composition faculty of the European American Musical Alliance in Paris from 2011–2022. In 2011, he joined the board of the American Composers Forum, serving until 2017. Since 2014 he has been the Composer in Residence with Cappella SF, a San Francisco-based professional chorus. In 2017, Conte travelled to the UK as the judge of the Caritas International Young Composer Competition hosted by the Caritas Chamber Choir, returning again in 2019 to judge the renamed Caritas International Emerging Composer Competition. In 2018, he joined the faculty of the Choral Chameleon Summer Institute for Composers and Conductors in New York City, New York. In 2022, he joined the faculty of SongFest, an annual festival dedicated to the medium of art song, and in 2021–22 he served as a composer-mentor for the National Association of Teachers of Singing.

In 1982, Conte lived and worked at the home of Aaron Copland, where he undertook a study of the manuscript sketches of Copland’s last orchestral work, “Inscape,” which became the basis of his doctoral thesis at Cornell University. Conte’s choral music has been the subject of four doctoral theses, and he is the author of articles on Copland, Vaughan Williams, and on the pedagogy of choral composition, all published in The Choral Journal, the membership-based monthly publication of the American Choral Director’s Association.

One of his best-known works is the opera The Gift of the Magi (Nicholas Giardini, librettist), which has received over 45 productions in the U.S., Canada, Europe, and Russia. His opera The Dreamers (Philip Littell, librettist), led to a commission from the Oakland Symphony for The Journey (a cantata, 2001). Film scores include Orozco: Man of Fire for the PBS American Master's Series (2006), and Ballets Russes shown at the Sundance and Toronto Film Festivals (2005). Other prominent works include “Fantasy for Orchestra”, and “A Copland Portrait” (orchestra and band), and Soliloquy, and Pastorale and Toccata (organ). Many of his choral works have received wide acceptance, including Cantate Domino, Invocation and Dance, Ave Maria, Charm me asleep, Elegy for Matthew (in memory of Matthew Sheppard, text by John Stirling Walker), September Sun (in memory of 9/11, with text also by Walker), An Exhortation (composed for the 2009 inauguration of President Barack Obama), and Three Mexican Folk Songs.

Conte's work is represented on many commercial CD recordings, including Chamber Music of David Conte (2015) on the Albany label, Facing West: Choral Music of Conrad Susa and David Conte (2016) on the Delos label, Everyone Sang: Vocal Music of David Conte (2018) on the Arsis label, and Intimate Voices: Chamber Music of David Conte (2025) on the Pentatone label.

== Works ==
=== Operas ===
- The Dreamers (1996)
- The Gift of the Magi (1997)
- Firebird Motel (2003)
- America Tropical (2007)
- Famous (2007)
- Stonewall (2013)

=== Musicals ===
- The Passion of Rita St. James (produced at the San Francisco Conservatory in 2003)

=== Film scores ===
- Ballets Russes (Sundance and Toronto Film Festivals in 2005)
- Orozco: Man of Fire (PBS American Masters Series, 2007)

=== Chamber works (partial list) ===
- String Quartet No. 2 (Commissioned by the Ives Quartet; 2010)
- Sonata for Cello and Piano (2012)
- Piano Trio (2013)
- Sonata for Clarinet and Piano (2019)

=== Orchestral works (partial list) ===
- The Masque of the Red Death (1992; revised 1994)
- A Copland Portrait (2000)
- Sinfonietta (2013)
- Concerto for Cello and Orchestra (2018)

=== Choral works (partial list) ===
- Cantate Domino (SATB 1975)
- Hosanna (SATB; 1979; SSAA; 1982)
- Canticle (From Three Sacred Pieces – TTBB 1982; SATB 1984)
- The Waking (SATB 1985)
- Invocation and Dance (TTBB 1986; SATB 1989)
- Valediction (SATB, organ; 1989)
- Ave Maria (SATB 1991)
- In Praise of Music (SSA 1991; SATB 1994)
- Charm me asleep (SATB 1993)
- American Triptych (SATB, chamber ensemble; 1999)
- Elegy for Matthew (TTBB 1999: SATB 2000)
- September Sun (SATB, String Orchestra; 2002)
- O Magnum Mysterium (SATB; 2002)
- A Hope Carol (SSAA 2006)
- The Nine Muses (ACDA Brock commission; SATB 2007)
- An Exhortation (Premiered at the Presidential Inauguration of President Barack Obama; TTBB, SSAA, SATB 2009)
- Carmina Juventutis (TTBB, piano four-hands)
- Songs of Love and War (TTBB, piano four-hands; 2011)
- Three Mexican Folk Songs (SATB; TTBB; SSAA; 2 violins, guitar, bass, or piano; 2014)
- A Whitman Triptych (SATB; 2015)

=== Vocal works (partial list) ===
- Yeats Songs (high voice and string quartet or piano 1984–2011)
- Songs of Consolation (soprano and organ 1997)
- Sexton Songs (soprano, piano or chamber ensemble 1991–2004)
- Everyone Sang (baritone, piano 2003; edition for bass 2018)
- Three Poems of Christina Rossetti (mezzo and piano 2008; edition for high voice 2014)
- Requiem Songs (soprano, solo violin, harp, organ, 2013; arr. string orchestra 2017)
- American Death Ballads (high voice and piano 2015; edition for medium voice 2016)
