= Avshalomov =

Avshalomov (masculine, Russian: Авшало́мов) or Avshalomova (feminine, Russian: Авшало́мовa) is a Russian surname. Notable people with the surname include:

- Aaron Avshalomov (1894–1965), Russian composer
- Hizgil Avshalumov (1913–2001), Soviet novelist, poet and playwright.
- Jacob Avshalomov (1919–2013), American composer and conductor
- David Avshalomov (1946-), American classical composer, vocalist, and conductor.
