= Cappella SF =

American a cappella professional choir

Cappella SF (San Francisco) is a choir founded in 2014 by Ragnar Bohlin, artistic director of the Grammy-award-winning San Francisco Symphony Chorus. Cappella SF is one of the only groups in the Bay Area singing acappella music from all periods of the choral repertoire.

Cappella SF has recorded a Christmas CD, Light of Gold, and Facing West, a CD with music by Bay Area composers David Conte and Conrad Susa.
