= Universitetsholmen =

Artificial island in Malmö, Sweden

Coordinates: 55.60909°N 12.99437°E

- Neighbourhood
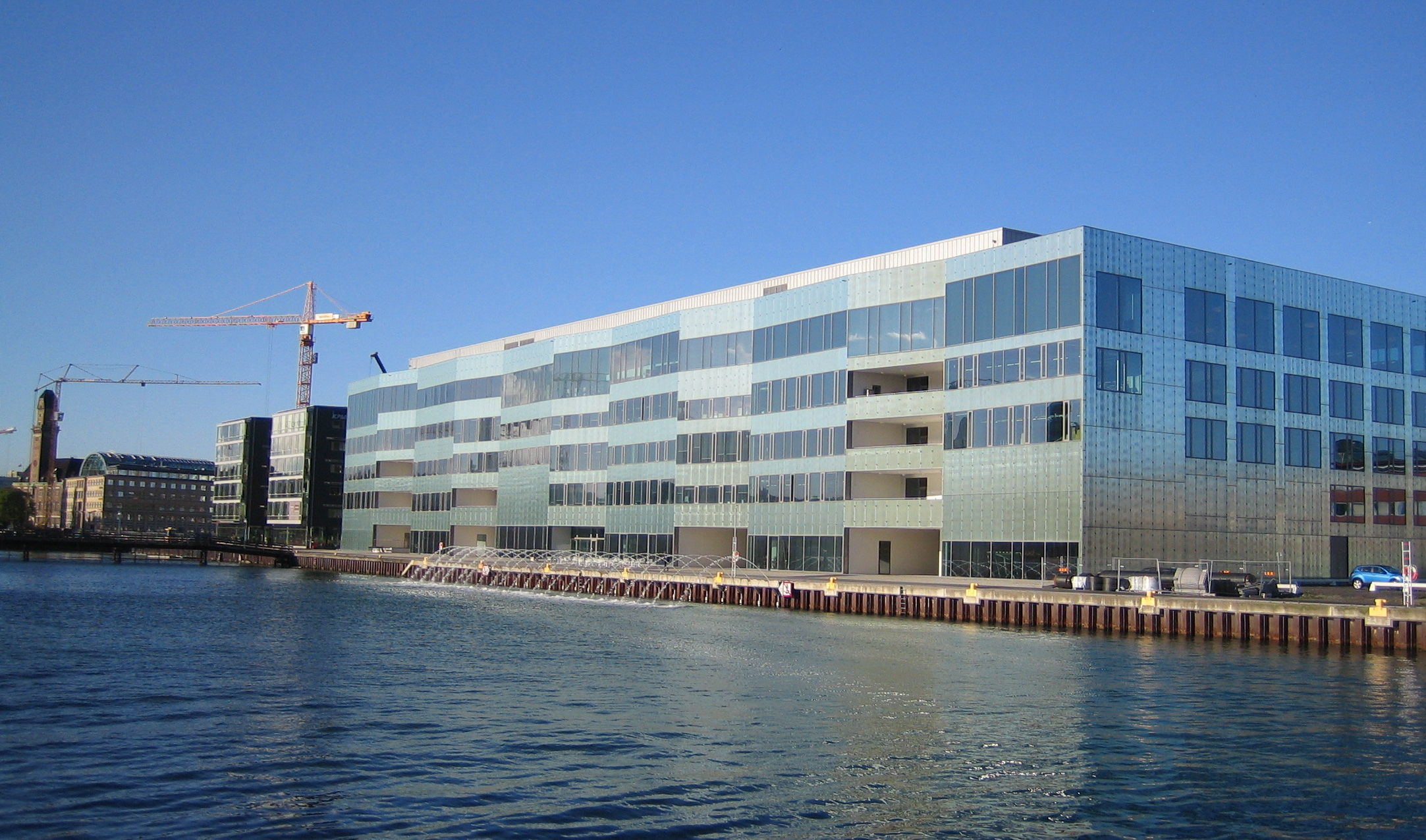
- The eastern shore of Universitetsholmen, the Hjälmarekajen quay, with the Malmö University building Orkanen
- Interactive map of Universitetsholmen
- Country: Sweden
- City: Malmö

Universitetsholmen (University island) is an artificial island and a neighbourhood in central Malmö, Sweden, immediately west of Malmö Central Station.

== History and use ==
The island got its name when the former college, now Malmö University, was established. Universitetsholmen is completely surrounded by water and bordered by the Inner Harbor, Suellshamnen, the Western Port Channel, Citadellshamnen, and the Southern Shipyard Basin. The days of industry and shipping in the area are over. The Southern Shipyard Basin has been dredged to reduce its depth and promote marine life. The Shipyard Canal has berths for small boats.

The area has landmarks such as the university buildings Orkanen and Niagara, the new Appellate court, and the event venue Malmö Live, situated on the southern part of Universitetsholmen. Older buildings include the harbor master's residence, today's market hall, a former train station, and active grain silos along the Neptunigatan street. New residential and office buildings and quayside promenades with seating and greenery.

== Gallery ==
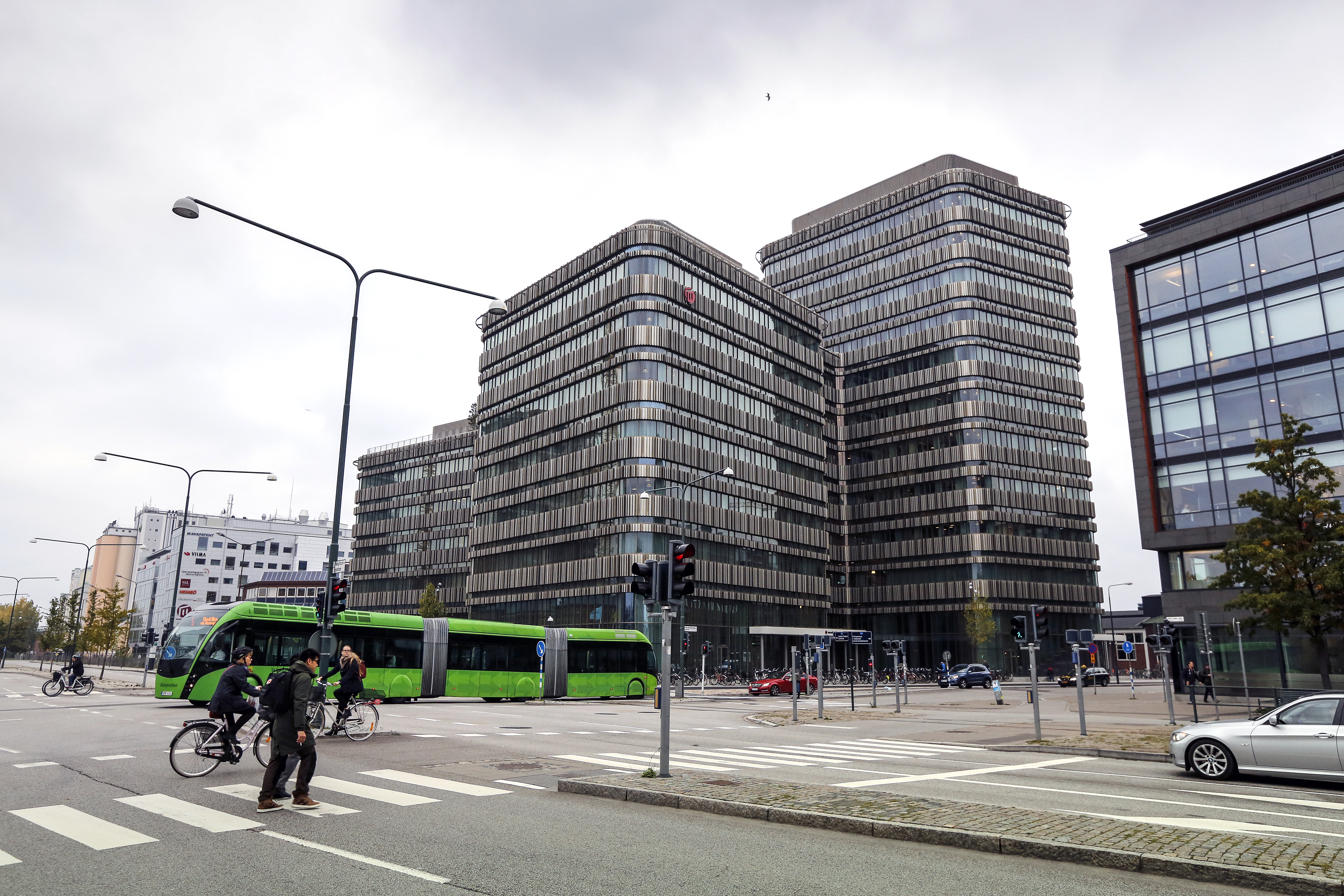
The Niagara building

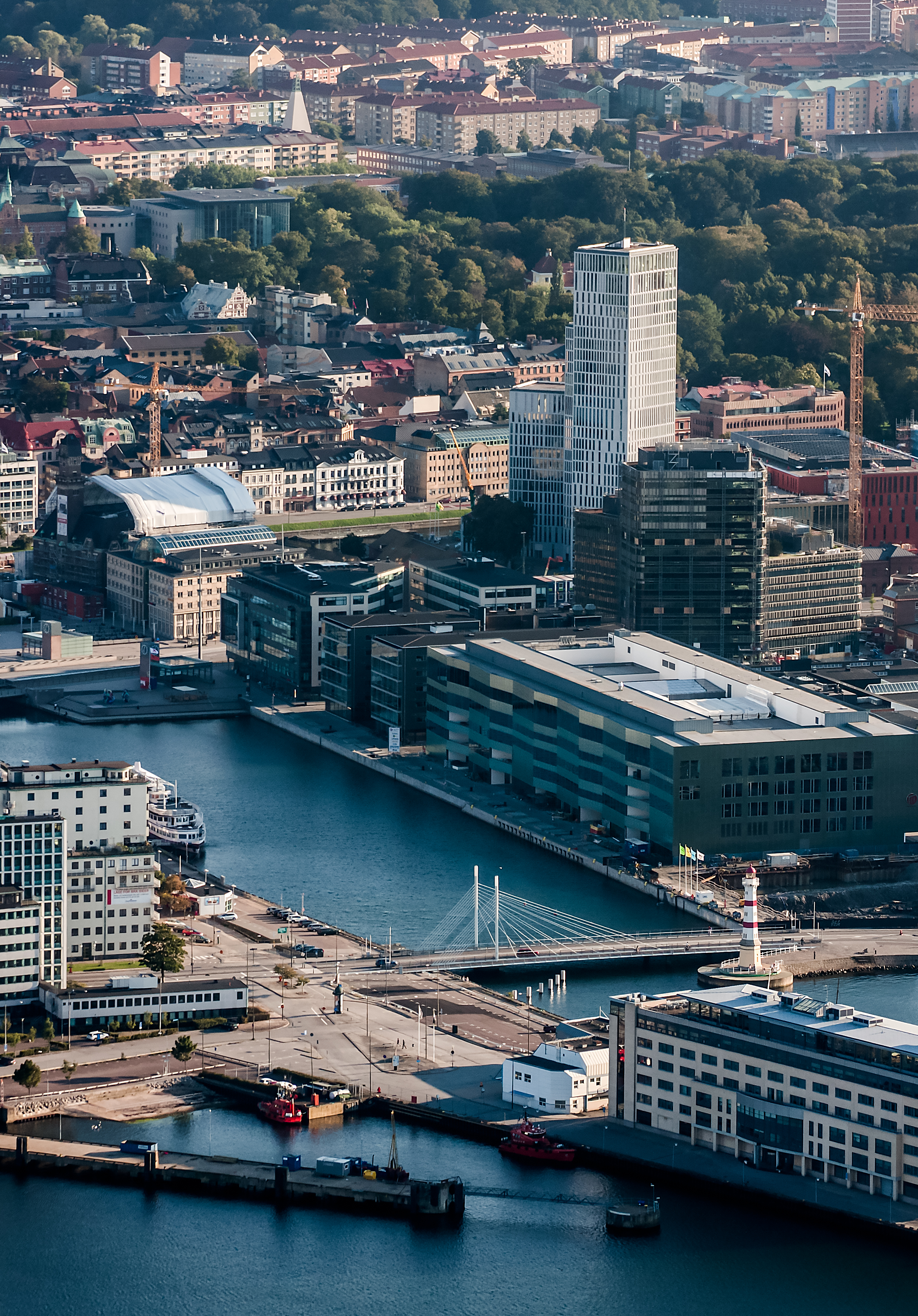
Universitetsholmen and the Inner Harbor seen from the air

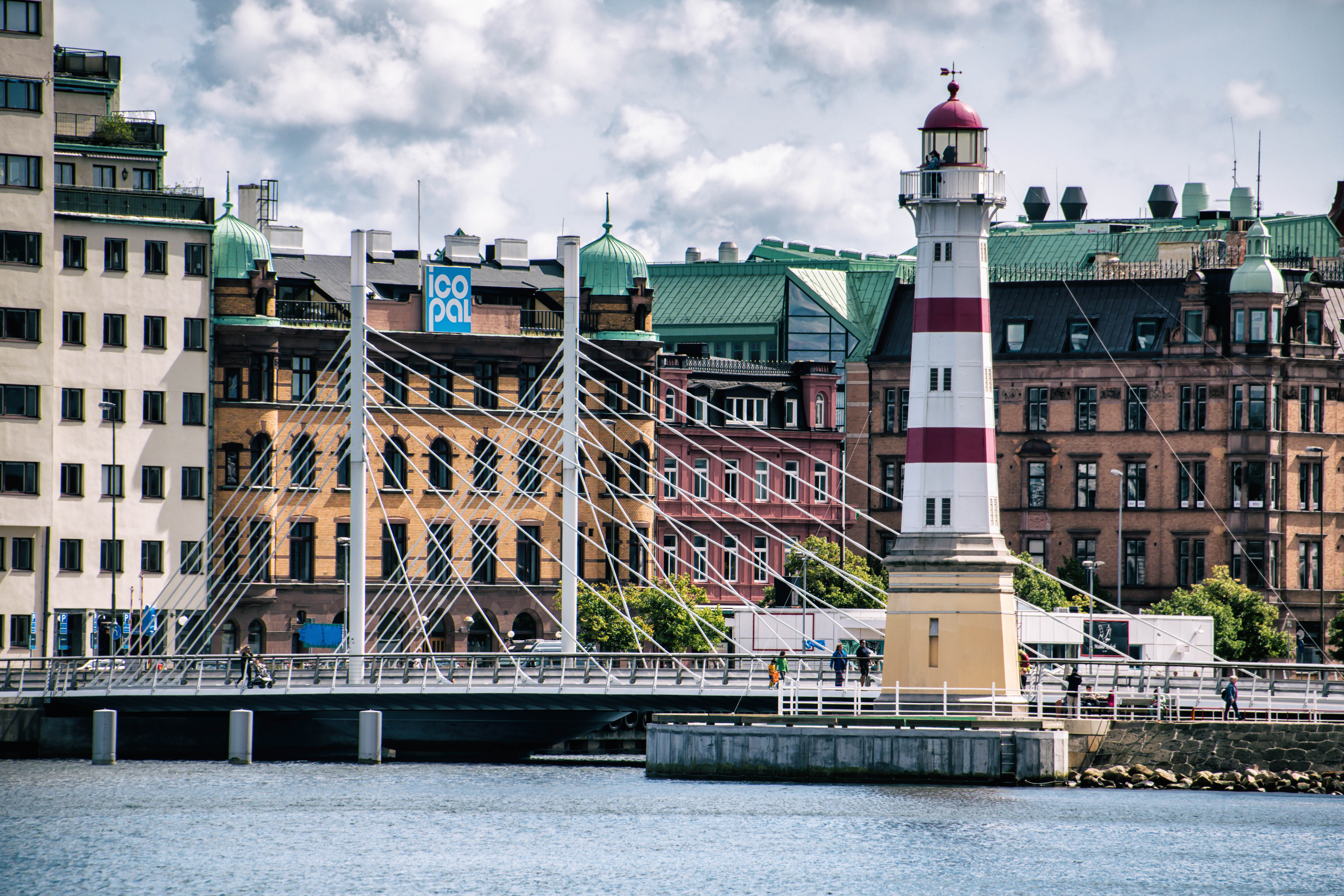
The Universitetsbron bridge and the Malmö inre fyr lighthouse

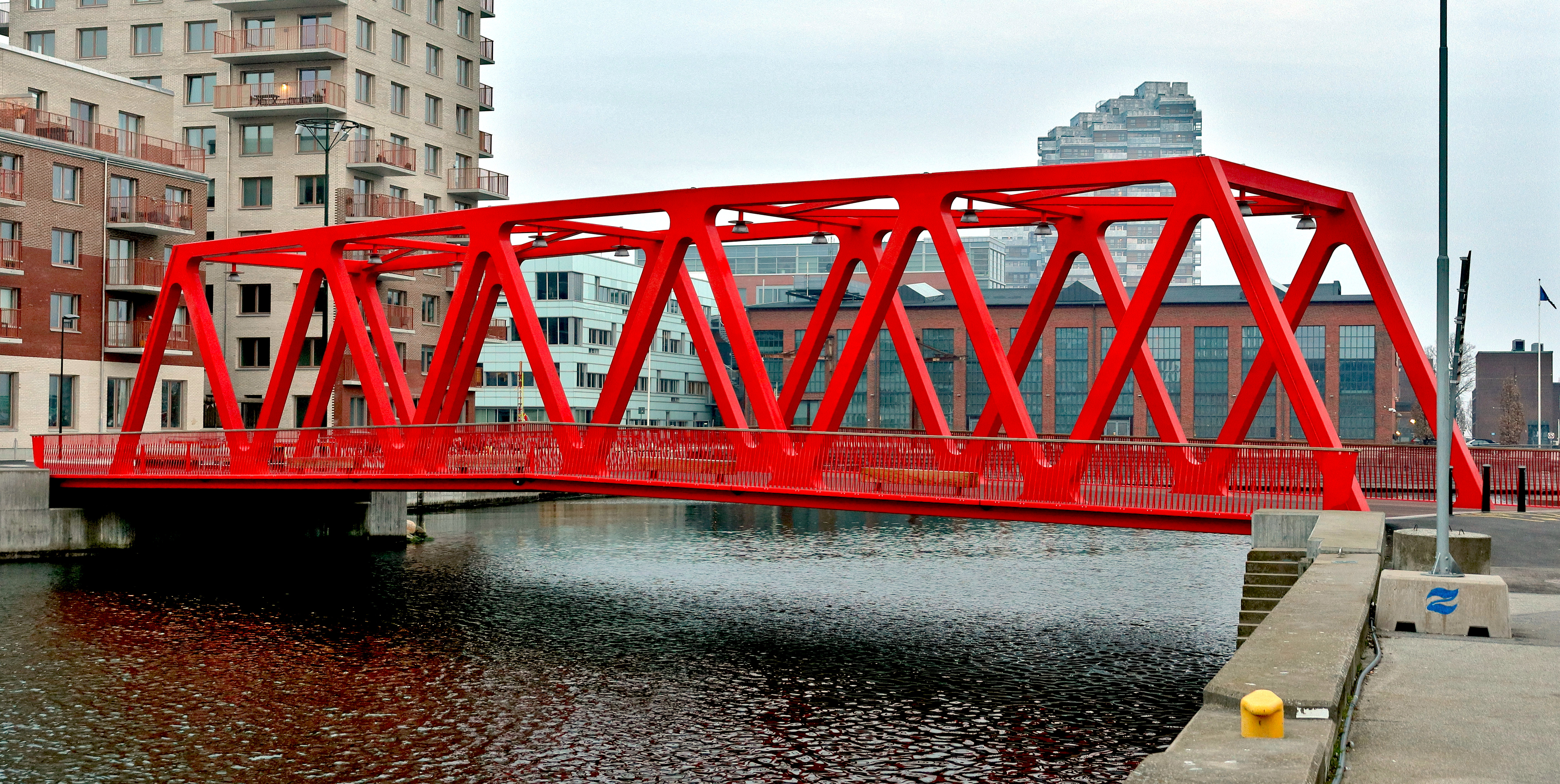
Beijers bro bridge

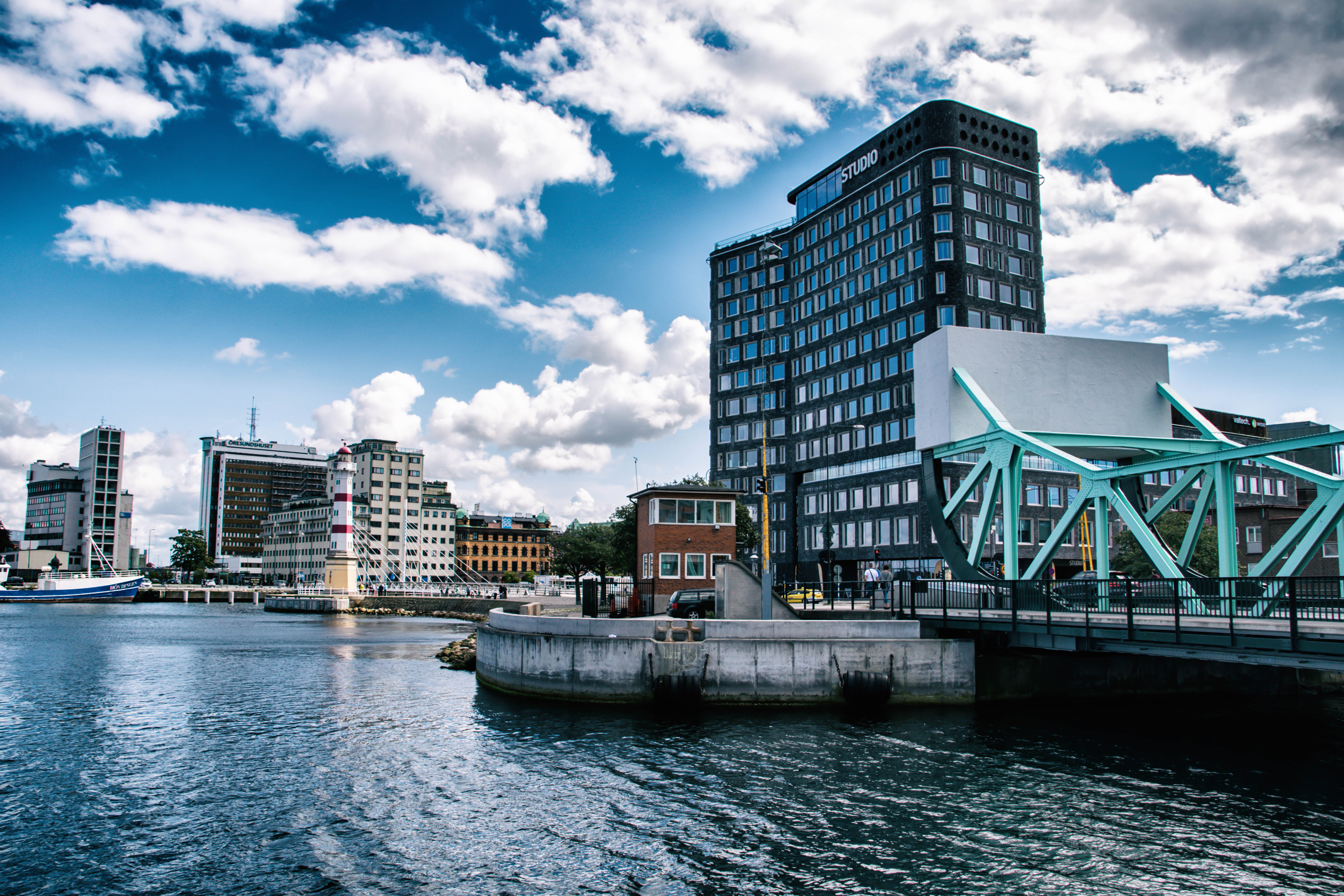
The Klaffbron bridge and the Studio building

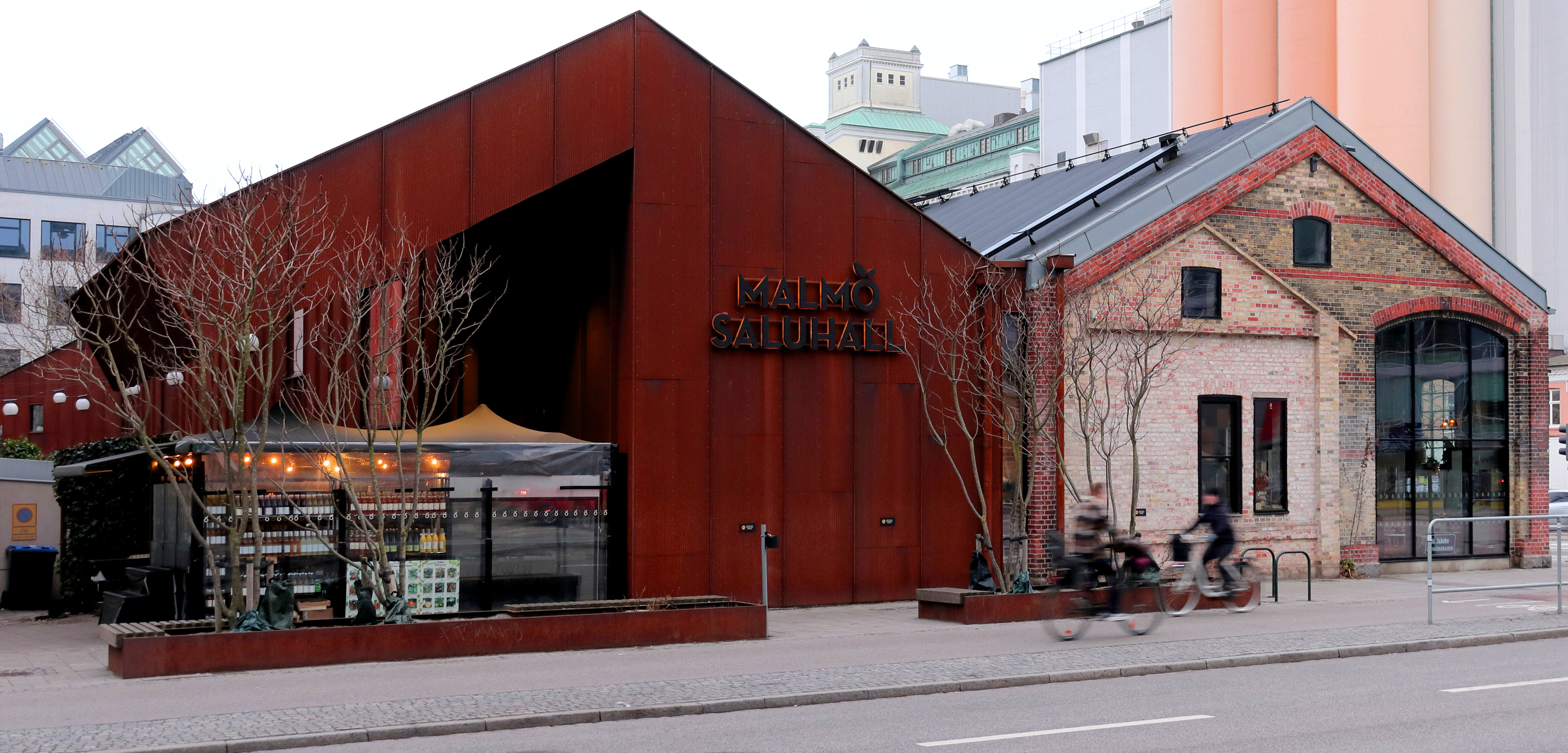
Malmö Saluhall market hall

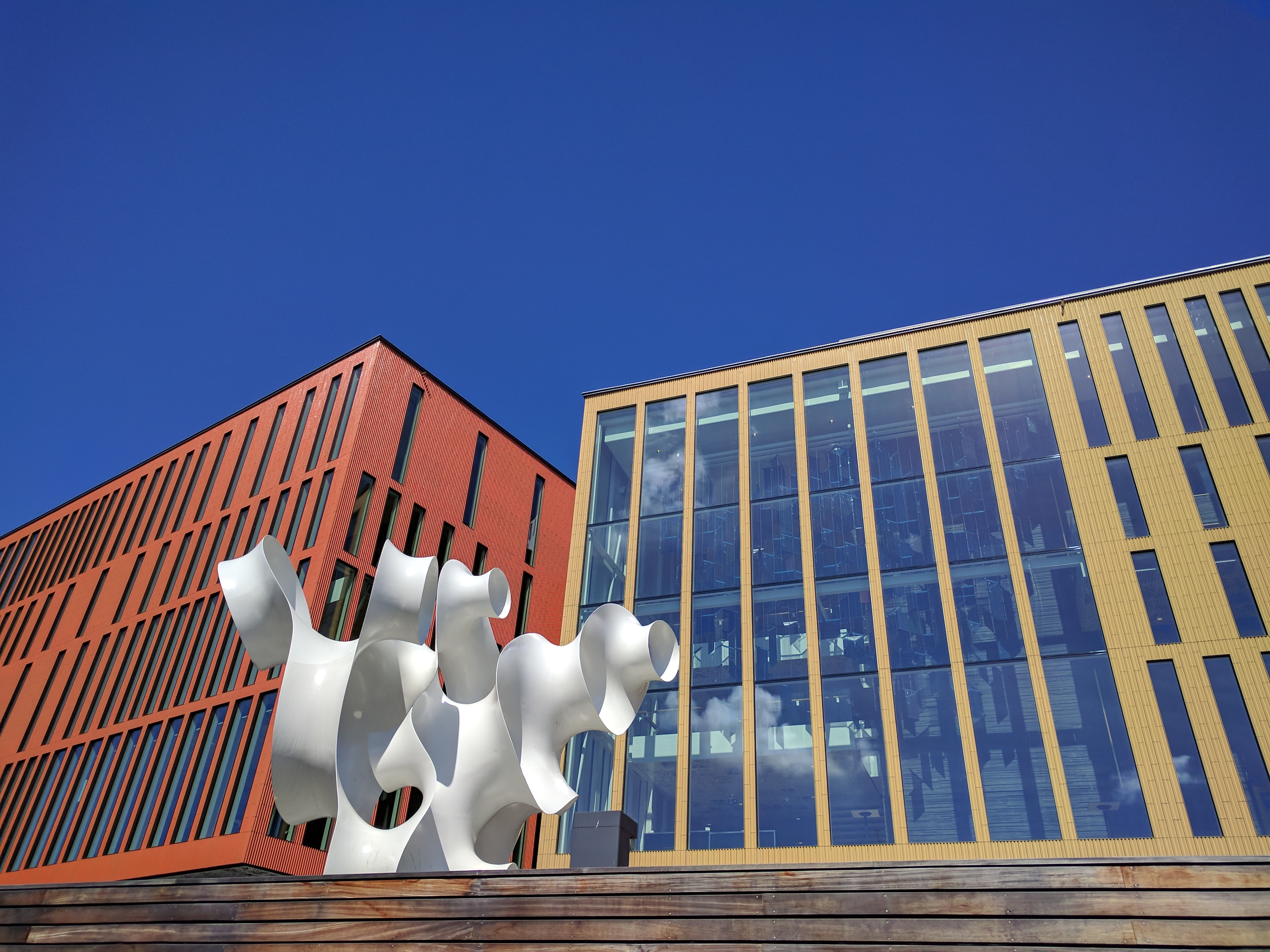
The event venue Malmö Live
