= David Avshalomov =

American classical composer

- Born: May 6, 1946 (age 80); New York City, New York, U.S
- Era: Contemporary

David Avshalomov (born 6 May 1946) is a third generation classical composer, singer, and conductor. David is the son of Jacob Avshalomov and grandson of Aaron Avshalomov who were both distinguished classical musicians. As a composer, he has been commissioned by several orchestras such as the San Jose Chamber Orchestra, Mission Chamber Orchestra, Oddysea Chorus of Lisbon, and the Anglican Chorale of Southern California. He is also a vocalist - having served in the United States Air Force as a Singing Sergeant - and conductor.

== Life ==
Son of composer Jacob Avshalomov and his wife Doris, David Avshalomov was born on May 6, 1946, in New York City, New York. He grew up in Oregon where his father, Jacob, served as the music director for the Portland Junior Symphony. Avshalomov enjoyed music from a young age, claiming that he "learned the joys of madrigal singing at home". He studied music theory and composition throughout grade school, and eventually continued these studies at both Harvard University and the University of Washington. Avshalomov would later serve a tour of duty in the United States Air Force as a Singing Sergeant, during which he composed several works - including his Spring Rondo. He now lives in Santa Monica, California, where he manages his label "Raven Music".

== Education ==
Avshalomov is an alumnus of both Harvard University and the University of Washington.

=== Harvard ===
In his senior year, Avshalomov performed with the Harvard-Radcliffe Orchestra as a percussionist in their performance of Darius Milhaud's "Percussion Concerto". He later graduated from Harvard in 1967 with a baccalaureate in Music. Avshalomov was one of ninety-nine seniors to receive honors from the Phi Beta Kappa chapter that year, writing his honor's thesis on "the melodic use of kettledrums in Western music".

=== University of Washington ===
Avshalomov began performing with the University of Washington (abbreviated "UW") Symphony Orchestra as early as October 1967, operating as the Orchestra's timpani player. He maintained this position throughout his time at the university while branching out into other positions within the artistic department. Avshalomov performed for UW's "Contemporary Group" in 1968, '72, '73, '74, and 1975 - when he served as the conductor for the group. He also conducted several of the university's operas, such as scenes from Act II of Madam Butterfly. In 1976 he published his doctoral dissertation on the Five Pieces for Orchestra by Arnold Schoenberg, earning him his Doctor of Musical Arts.

== Awards/Recognition ==
- American Prize for band composition in 2014 (3rd prize)
- American Prize for band composition in 2016 (2nd prize)
- International Orange Chorale of San Francisco Choral Composition Contest

== Compositions ==
=== Band ===
- Cornucopia of Rounds (1980)
- Glockenspiel March (1968, rev. 1997)
- Last Stand, The (2013) - American Prize winner for band composition in 2014 (3rd prize)
- Lifeboat Variations (1979, rev. 2014)
- Prime Time [Toccata Brillante] (2000)
- Hill Dance (transcribed 2015) - American Prize winner for band composition in 2016 (2nd prize)
- Spring Rondo (1971)

=== Choral ===
- O Euchari Columba (2006) - Winner of International Orange Chorale of San Francisco Choral Composition Contest (2016)
- I Bend the Knee of My Heart (2006)

=== Orchestra ===
- Elegy (1989) - Written for string orchestra; in memory of Leonard Bernstein
