= Malmö Live =

Swedish event venue

Coordinates: 55°36′27″N 12°59′37″E

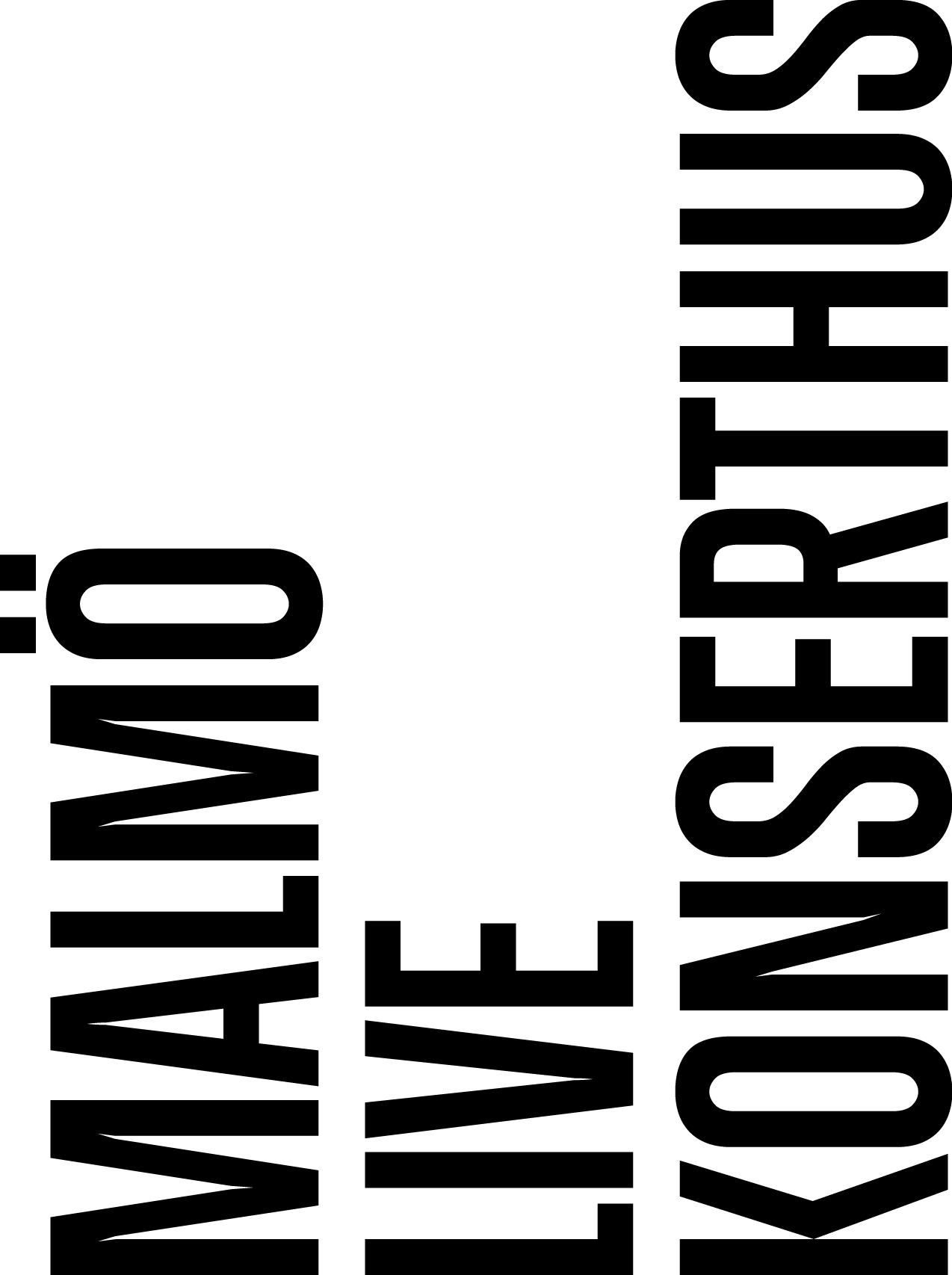

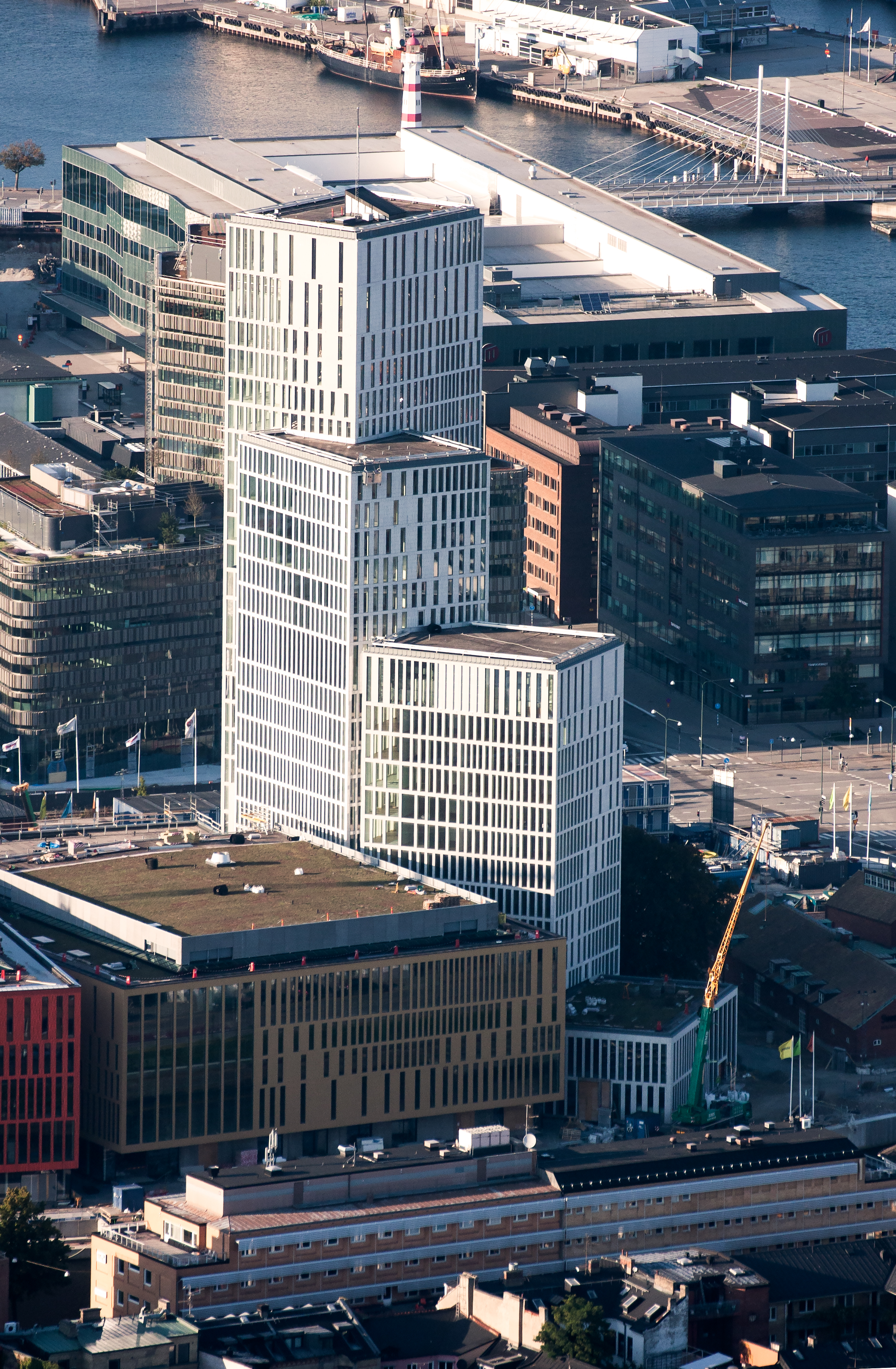
- Malmö Live seen from the air, 2014
- Interactive map of Malmö Live
- Address: Dag Hammarskjölds torg 4 Malmö; Sweden
- Capacity: 1600
- Public transit: Bus 3, 5, 7, 8, 10 and 47
- Parking: Car park Malmö Live, Gibraltargatan; Car park Godsmagasinet, Södra Neptunigatan; Car park Bagers Plats, Nordenskiöldsgatan

Construction
- Groundbreaking: 2012
- Opened: 15 June 2015
- Architect: Schmidt Hammer Lassen
- Builder: Skanska

Website
- malmolive.se/en

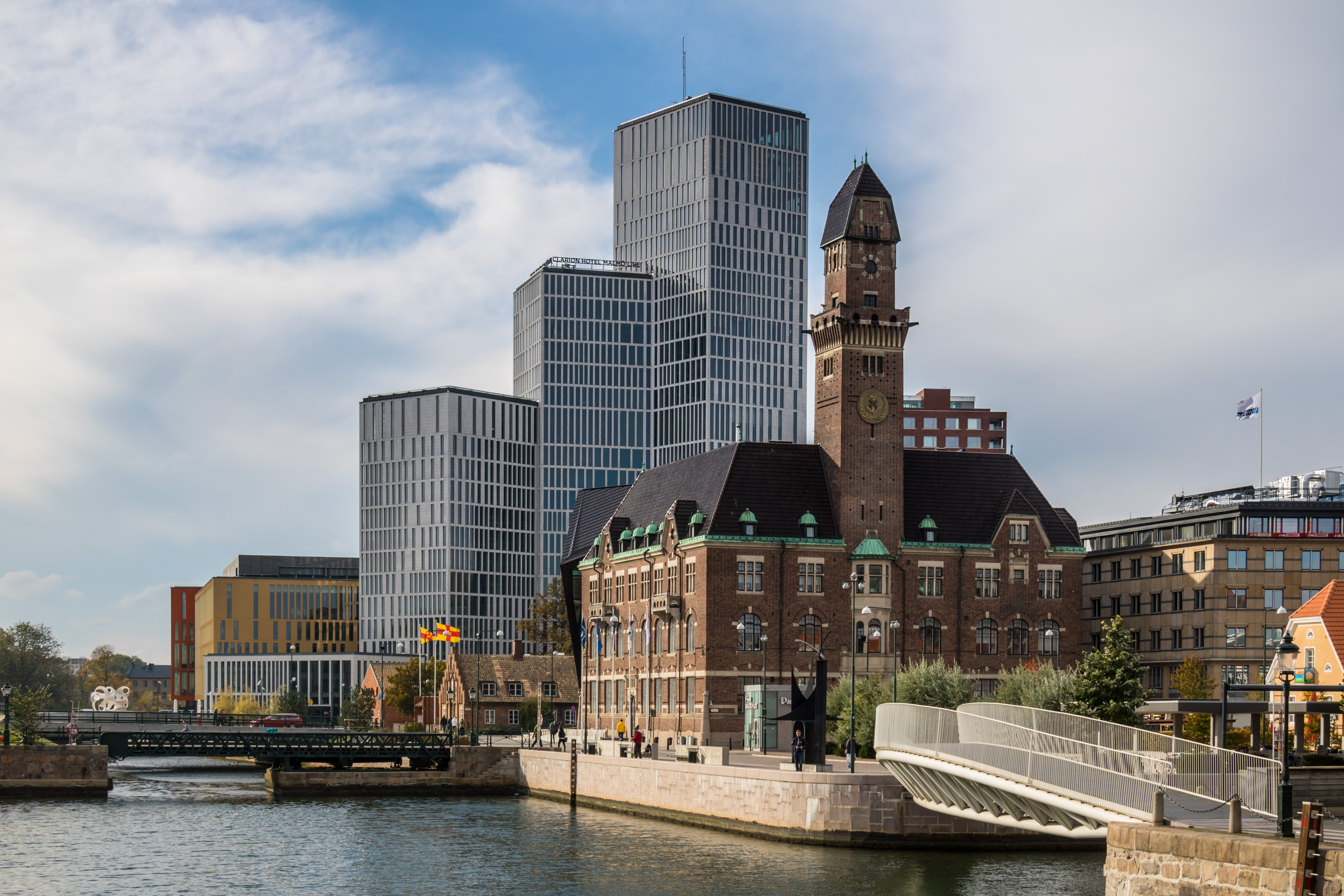
Malmö Live

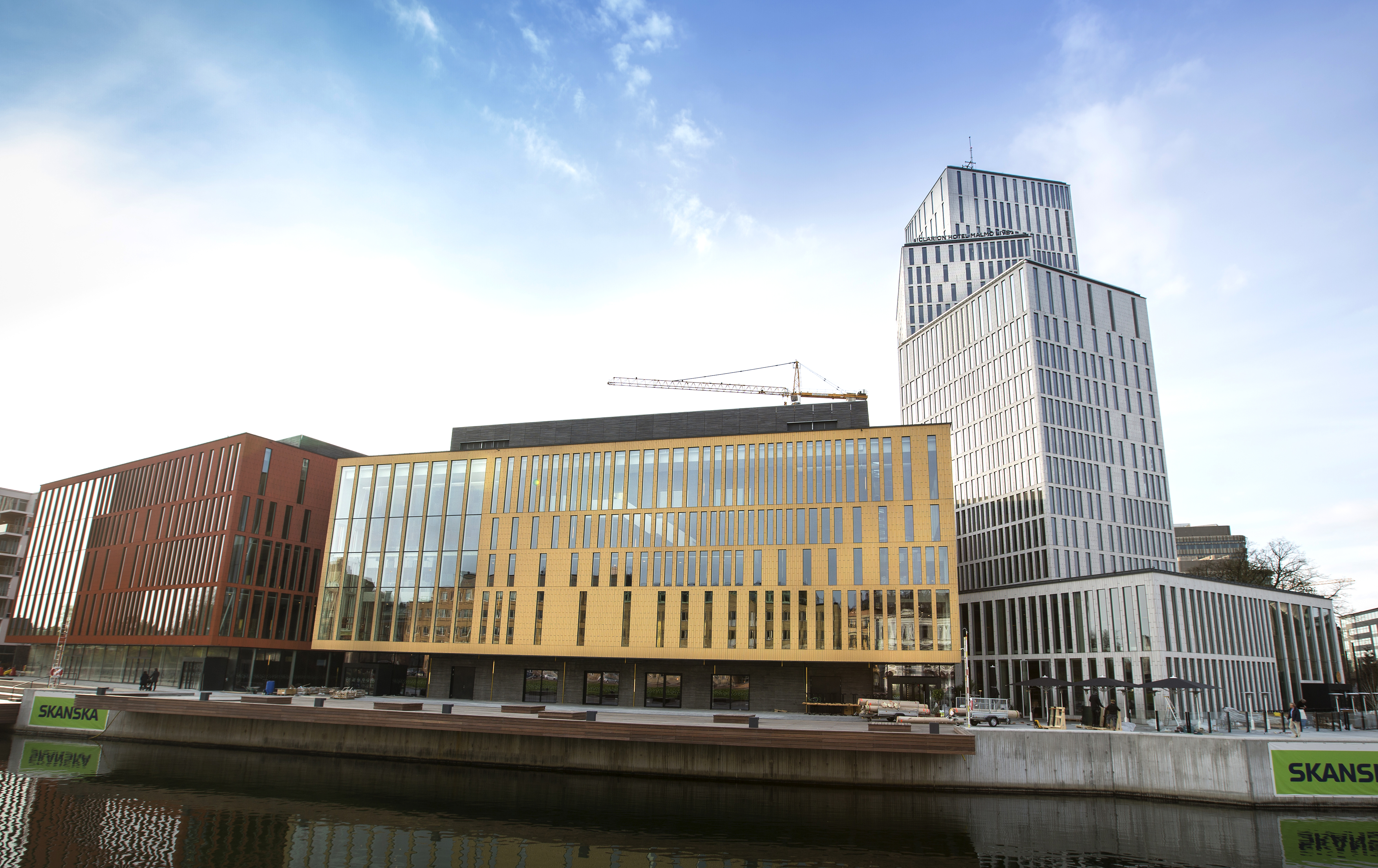
Malmö Live

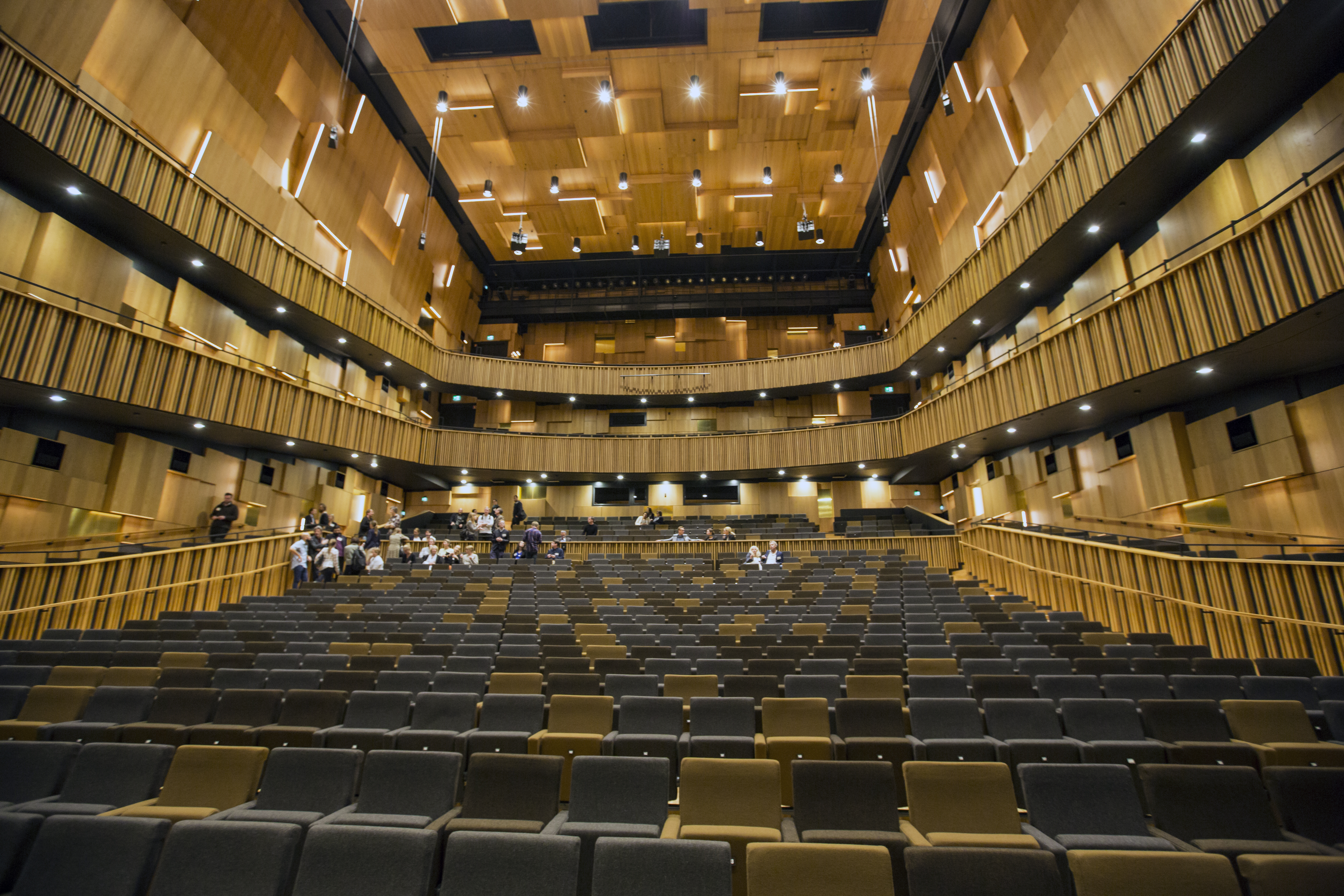
Interior of Malmö Live Concert Hall

Malmö Live is an event venue in Malmö, Sweden. A city block comprising a concert hall, convention center, hotel, and several residential and office buildings situated just north of the canal, on the University Island. It opened in August 2015. Malmö Live Concert Hall is the home of the Malmö Symphony Orchestra and can fit up to 1,600 people.

== Area and activities ==
On old, centrally located harbor area land, created by land reclamation in the 19th century, is the Torsken city block, where used to be the Neptuni park, the old Fish harbor and older harbor buildings such as Benmöllan from the 1850s. Through a project and land allocation competition in 2008, the City of Malmö decided to create a completely new district there, intended as a meeting place with music and congress in focus for residents and visitors. In 2010, it was decided to build the area that is now collectively known as Malmö Live. Construction began in 2012 and on June 4, 2015, the area was formally inaugurated, although some side buildings still remained to be completed. The developer is Skanska and the architect is Schmidt Hammer Lassen. The total cost of the entire complex (concert, congress and hotel) is estimated at SEK 1.4 billion. The entire block covers a total of 90,000 square meters.

At the heart of the venue is Malmö's new concert hall, Malmö Live Konserthus, the new home of the Malmö Symphony Orchestra, with a large concert hall for 1,600 listeners as well as a smaller, flexible venue, Kuben, and some side rooms. This is connected to the large hotel and congress center Clarion Hotel & Congress Malmö Live where the tallest building at 85 meters has 25 floors, 24 conference rooms and a congress hall for 1500 participants, as well as restaurants and skybar. Around this central complex, several freestanding taller buildings with housing and offices are being constructed. The area also includes the two older buildings Västra station - a former railway station - and the Church of Sweden building Sjömansgården. The area around Malmö Live includes Malmö University, Malmö Museums, World Maritime University, the Scania and Blekinge Court of Appeal and Malmö Central Station / City Tunnel. Due to the appearance of several tall buildings, the area is sometimes also known as "Malmhattan". The current director of Malmö Live is Erik Mikael Karlsson since March 2024. Malmö Live hosts symphony orchestras, commercial, cultural and political events as well as business meetings. Hotel operations are managed separately by Strawberry.

== Artworks ==
A competition for artistic decoration was launched and held in the first half of 2014. The following works were selected for implementation:

- Passage, sculpture by Maha Mustafa at the Dag Hammarskjölds torg
- Dispersed three in live conjunction, three installations by the South Korean artist Haegue Yang, on house facades near the entrances
- E=v=e=n=t, neon sculpture by British artist, Cerith Wyn Evans, indoors
- Rubato, sculpture by Eva Hild, located outside the south entrance
- Minnenas Hav (Sea of Memories), installation by Karolina Erlingsson, outdoors in the ground in the northeast park space
- The wind wall, installation by Petter Thörne, Jens Vium Skaarup and Joshua Morrison, outdoors in the northeast park space
- Untitled, sound art by Kim Hedås, in the footbridge over the West Harbour Canal

== Gallery ==
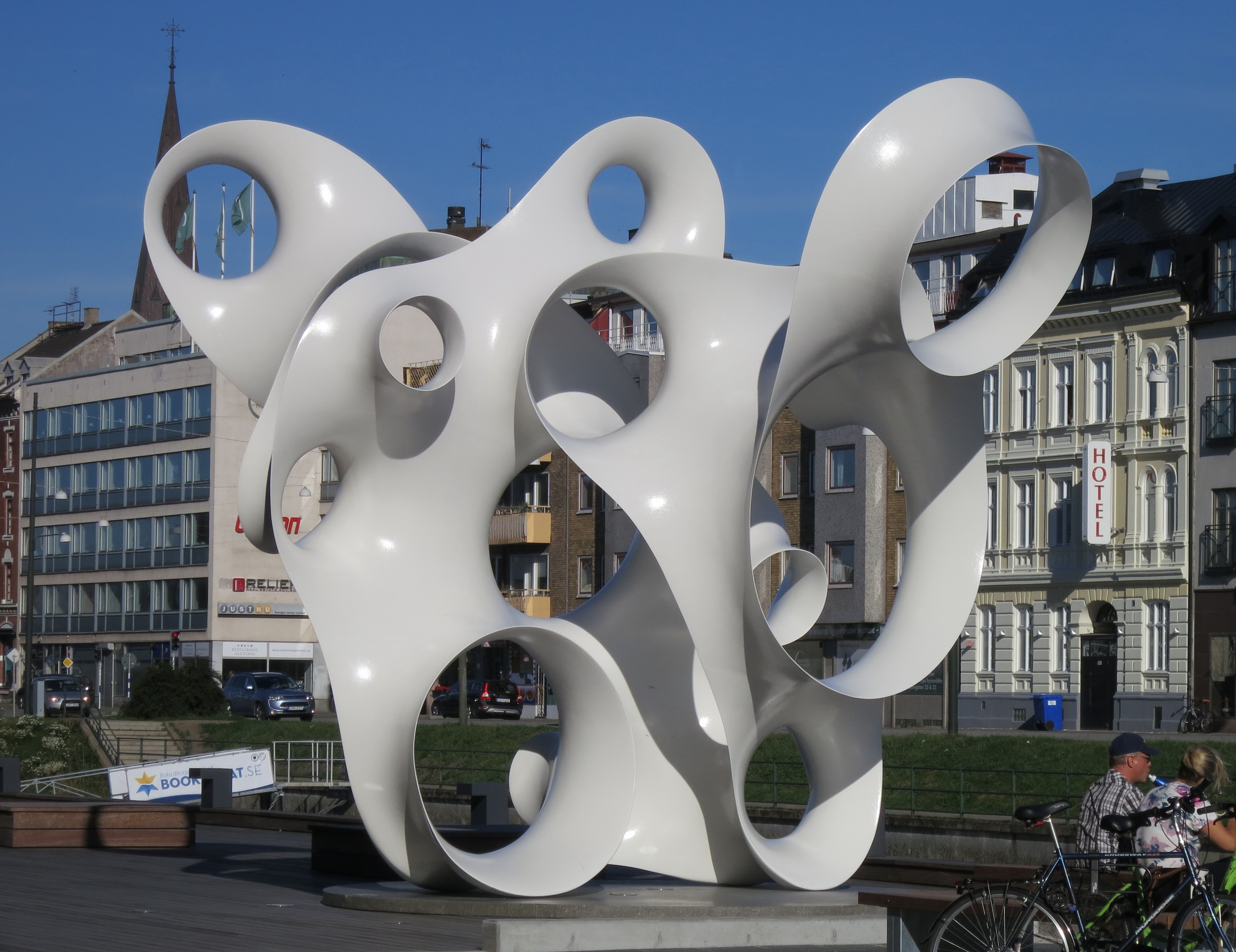
Rubato, sculpture by Eva Hild

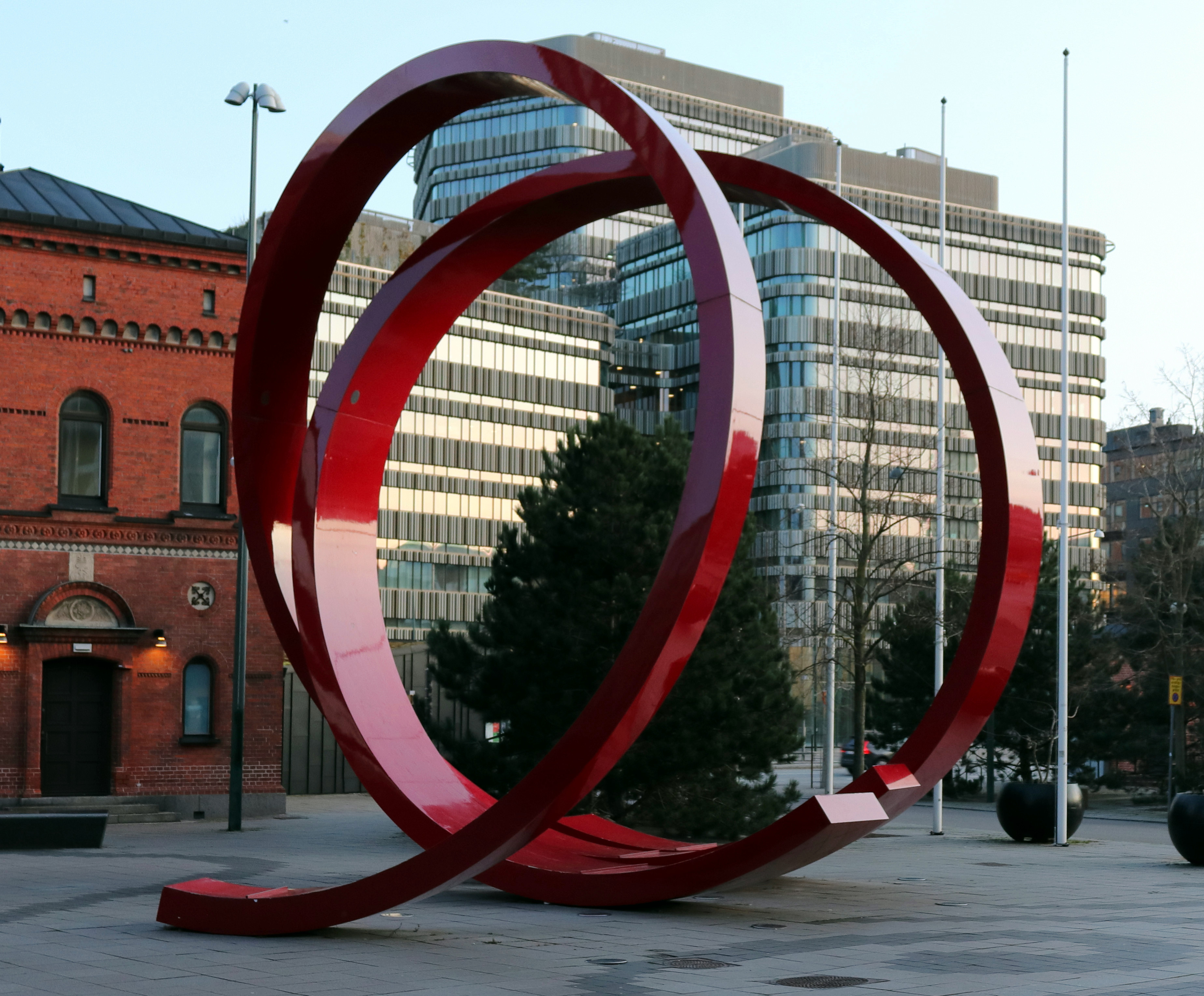
Passage, sculpture by Maha Mustafa

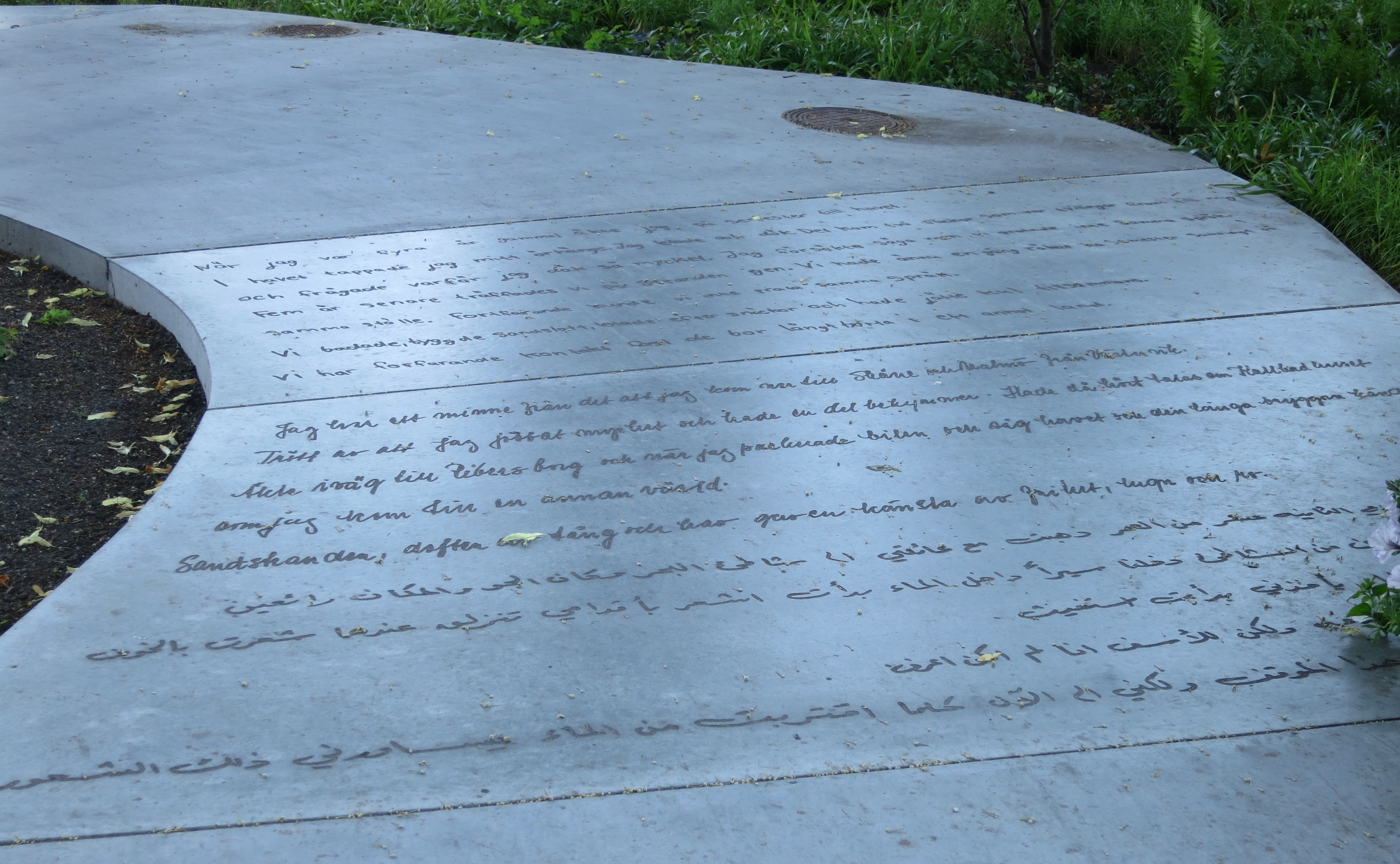
Minnenas hav, installation by Karolina Erlingsson

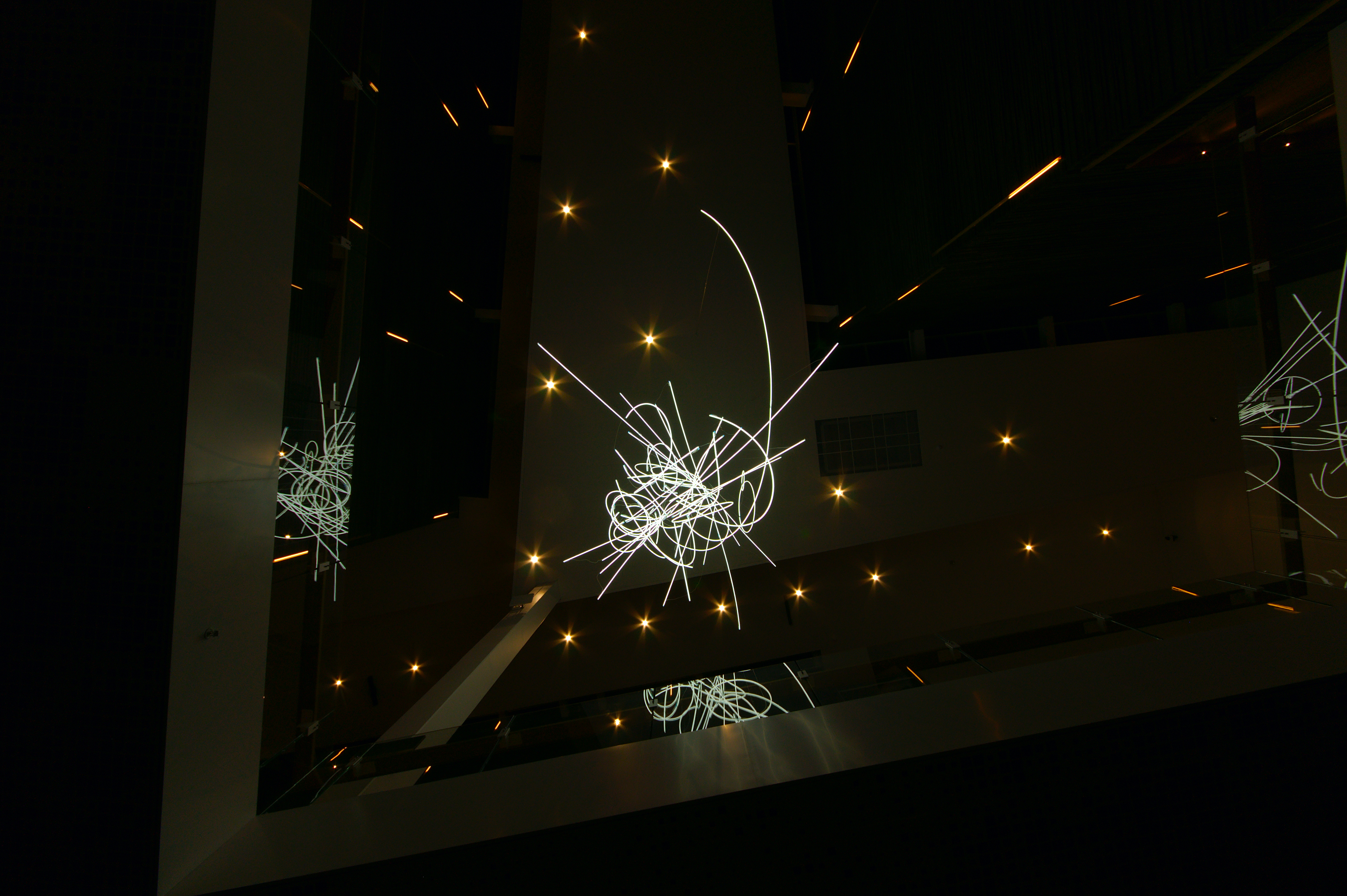
E=v=e=n=t, indoor neon sculpture by Cerith Wyn Evans
