= The Dreamers (opera) =

1996 opera by David Conte

The Dreamers is a chamber opera in four scenes with music by David Conte and libretto by Philip Littell.

Commissioned and premiered by Sonoma City Opera in September 1996, the opera centers around a town of "dreamers" who, though separated by sexual, racial, and cultural differences, are brought together through their dreams. From a gay man's dream of finding acceptance to an African-American's dream of earning enough money (as a gambler) to buy his wife out of slavery to an American soldier's dream of marrying "pretty Fanny" and obtaining "property," The Dreamers illustrates a fundamental right of America - to dream and pursue said dreams.

== Roles ==
=== Main ===
- General Mariano Guadalupe Vallejo, the first citizen of Sonoma
- Francisca Benicia de Vallejo, his wife
- Epifania (Fanny), their eldest daughter, the future Mrs. Frisbie
- Adelaida (Adela), the next girl, a little girl
- Platon, the second son, a little boy
- The Empress Isadora, cast-off wife of an Indian mercenary chief
- The Bear/Sam Shattuck, an African-American
- Bear-Flagger Merritt/Johnny Rowe, soldier, actor, dancer, costumier
- Bear-Flagger Semple/James Eastin, a new arrival, local businessman
- Bear-Flagger Grigsby/Captain (later General) John Frisbie
- Mary Eastin, wife to James Eastin
- Elizabeth Fine, her cousin, a recent widow

=== Secondary ===
- Major McDonell, retired, Eastin's business partner
- Manuel Garcia, ne'er-do-well
- The men's chorus (bear-flaggers, Stevenson's New York Volunteers, settlers, no-goods) and the Women's Chorus (pioneers, bear-flag women, laundresses, seamstresses, mothers, wives, Cyprians, spinsters, and divorcees)

== Synopsis ==
The Dreamers is set in the town of Sonoma at a time when California was no longer under Mexican control but not yet a state either (1848). In the opera, the Empress Isadora and Manuel Garcia – two social outcasts – sit around a campfire singing about the “lies and legends” of California when Sam, an African-American, enters. He asks the couple who owns the large house, which is standing behind them. Isadora and Garcia tell him that it is the house of General Vallejo – the former proprietor of California who lost everything during the infamous Bear Flag revolt (an incident about which he still has nightmares). And indeed, inside the house, the Vallejos are finding little sleep with tormenting visions of their past and present (so called “dreams that are real and wounds that will not heal.”). The following day is characterized by Colonel Jonathan D. Stevenson’s Regiment of New York Volunteers’ largely anticipated production of Othello. The entire town filters over to the Colonnade Theatre where the show is about to start. As Sam approaches the entrance, he is denied admission because he is black. However, they eventually let him into the theatre and seat him in the Vallejos’ box to the bemusement of a gathering crowd. As the production of Othello begins, Johnny Rowe – who has been cast in the title role – is trying to keep the attention of a distracted audience that is now anxiously awaiting the arrival of the General Vallejo and his family. Though late, the Vallejos do indeed arrive only to find themselves the laughing stock of Sonoma. With the performance now completely disrupted, the actors stop and watch as the General launches a vicious racial attack upon Sam. The Vallejos, furious, begin to leave but reluctantly agree to stay after the entire audience apologizes. The crowd sings “My Old Kentucky Home” to break the tension, which allows the dreams of Sonoma to be shared, and the opera concludes with the town of Sonoma singing about the very nature of dreams.

== Sources ==
- Conte, David. The Dreamers Official web site. 16 Nov. 2007.
- Hanson, Craig W. and Hoffman, Stanley M. “The Dreamers.” Opera Aria Anthology, Vol.3. Eds. Craig W. Hanson and Stanley M. Hoffman. Boston: EC Schirmer, 2005
- Littell, Philip. “RE: Question.” E-mails. 14 Nov. 2007
- Littell, Philip. The Dreamers.
- Belt, Byron, Review of The Dreamers, Opera News, December 28, 1996. Accessed 24 March 2008.
- Ganahl, Jane, Art vs. history: Sonoma city fathers in operatic battle, San Francisco Examiner, July 8, 1996. Accessed 27 March 2008.
