= Malmö University =

Swedish university

- Malmö universitet
- Motto: Där mångfald gör skillnad
- Type: Public
- Established: 1998; 28 years ago as college, 2018; 8 years ago as university
- Vice Chancellor: Prof. Kerstin Tham
- Administrative staff: 2,200 total (2021)
- Students: 12,700 (FTE, 2021); 273 doctoral students (2025)
- Location: Malmö, Skåne, Sweden; 55°36′28″N 12°59′47″E
- Campus: Urban
- Website: www.mau.se/en

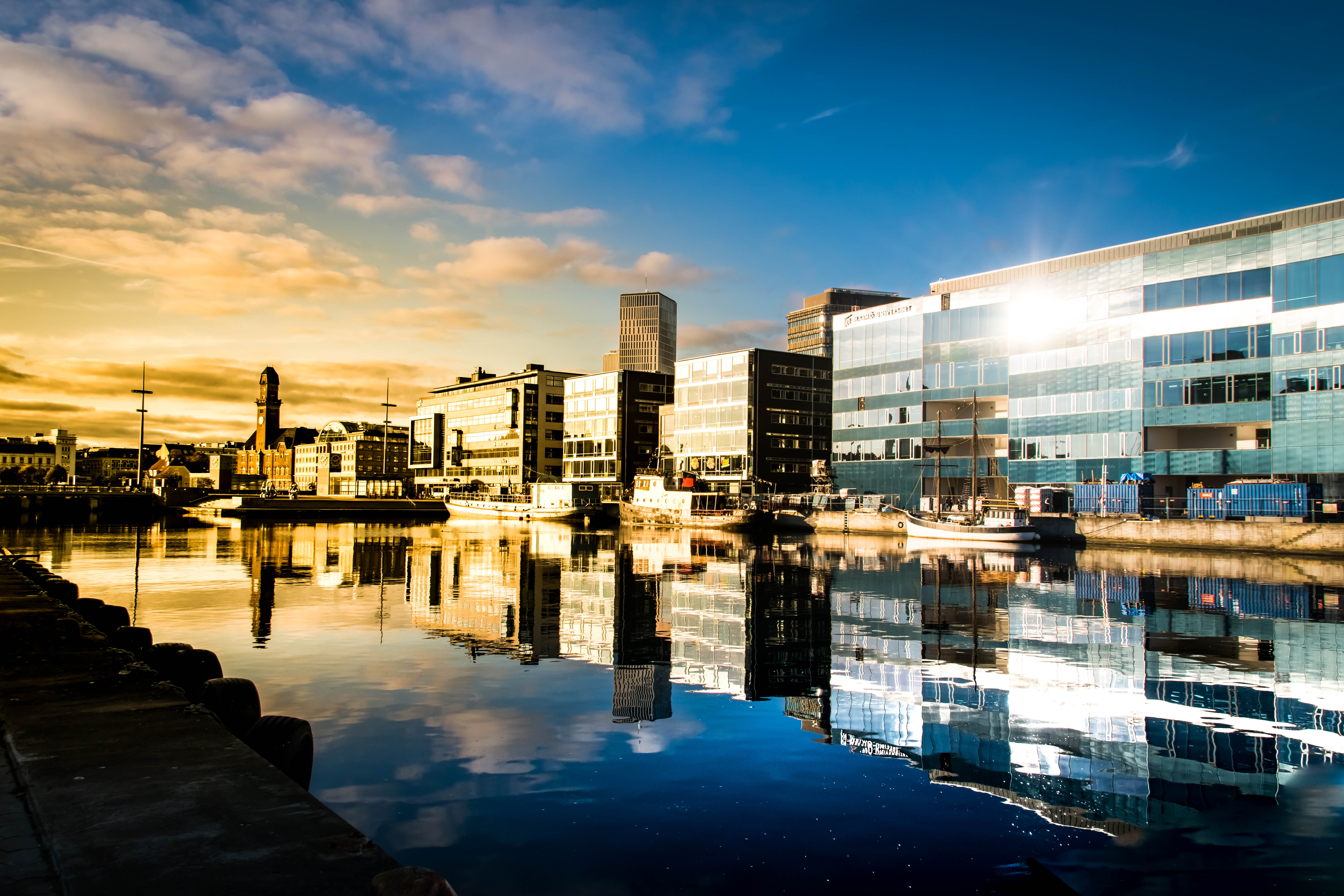
Library of Malmö University

Malmö University (Swedish: Malmö universitet) is a public university located in Malmö, Sweden. With more than 24,000 students and about 1,600 employees (academic and administrative), Malmö University is the ninth largest institute of learning in Sweden. It has exchange agreements with more than 240 partner universities around the world and roughly a third of the students have an international background. Education at Malmö University focuses on, among other things, migration, international relations, political science, sustainability, urban studies, and new media and technology. It often includes elements of internship and project work in close cooperation with external partners.

Located at Universitetsholmen in the centre of the city, the university has played an important role in the transformation of Malmö from an industrial town to a centre of learning. A large part of the campus was constructed on grounds which, up to the mid-1980s, belonged to the Kockums shipyard, which had been a key element of naval-industrial Malmö.

While this institution was founded as a university college ("högskola") in 1998, the Swedish minister for higher education and research conferred full university status on 1 January 2018.

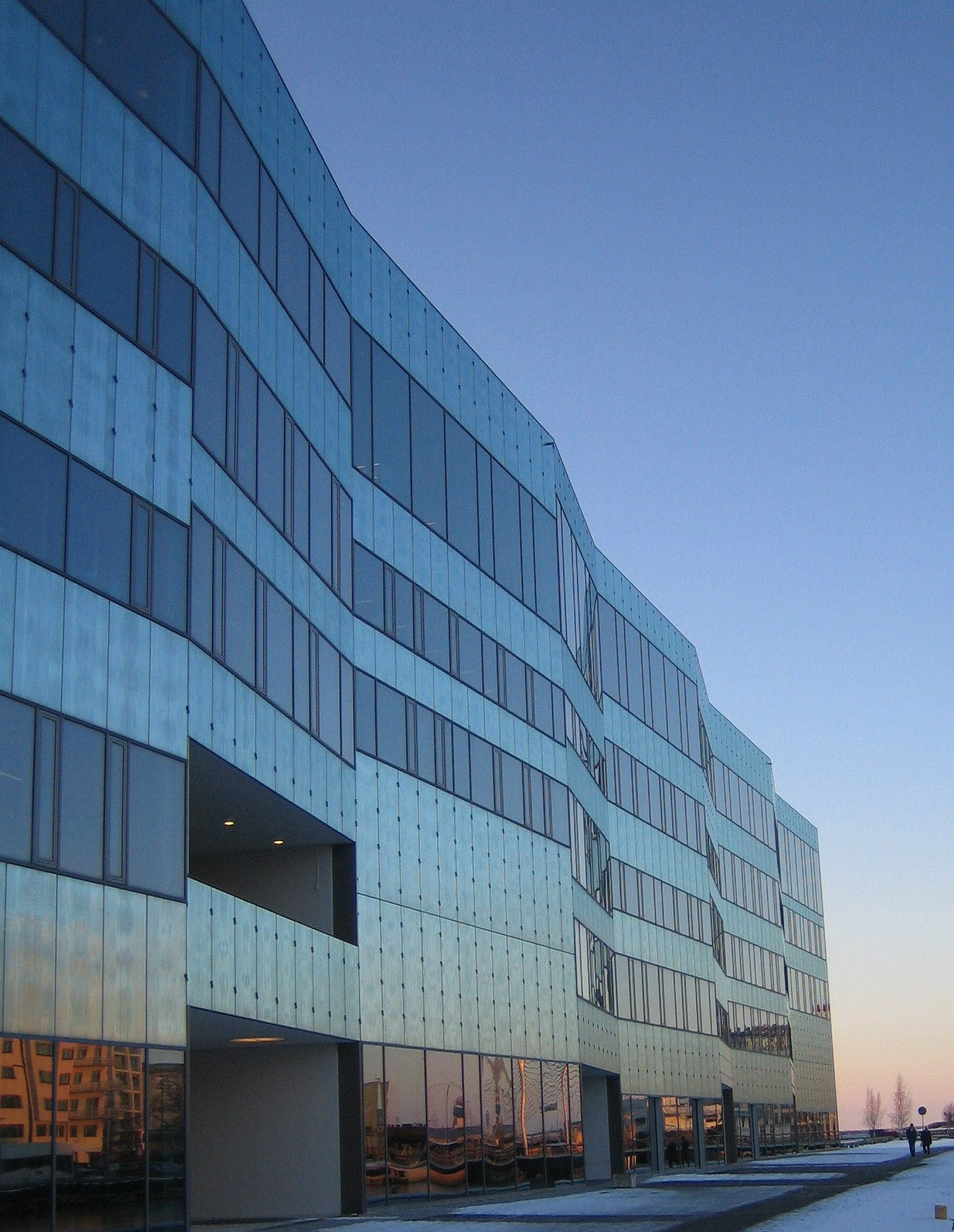
The building Orkanen contains the library.

== Quality of education ==
In 2007, by government initiative, the Swedish National Agency for Higher Education employed an international expert committee to find and award the top five highest quality education areas among all universities and colleges in Sweden. The Faculty of Odontology at Malmö University was awarded one of these distinctions ("Centre of Excellence in Higher Education"). The other awards went to Linköping University (Medicine and Control Theory/Vehicle Engineering), Royal Institute of Technology (Vehicle Engineering), and Umeå University (History).

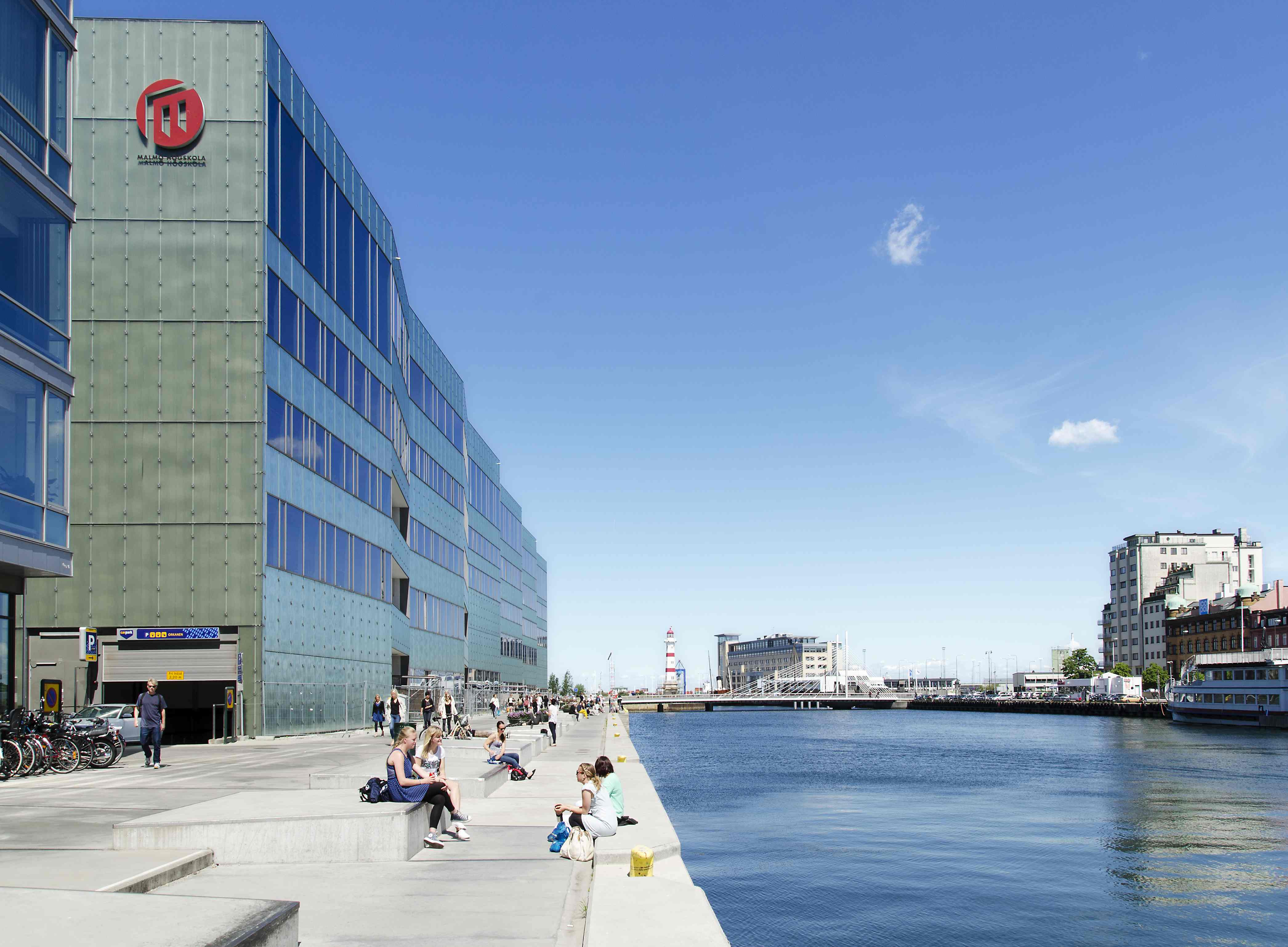
Hjälmarekajen

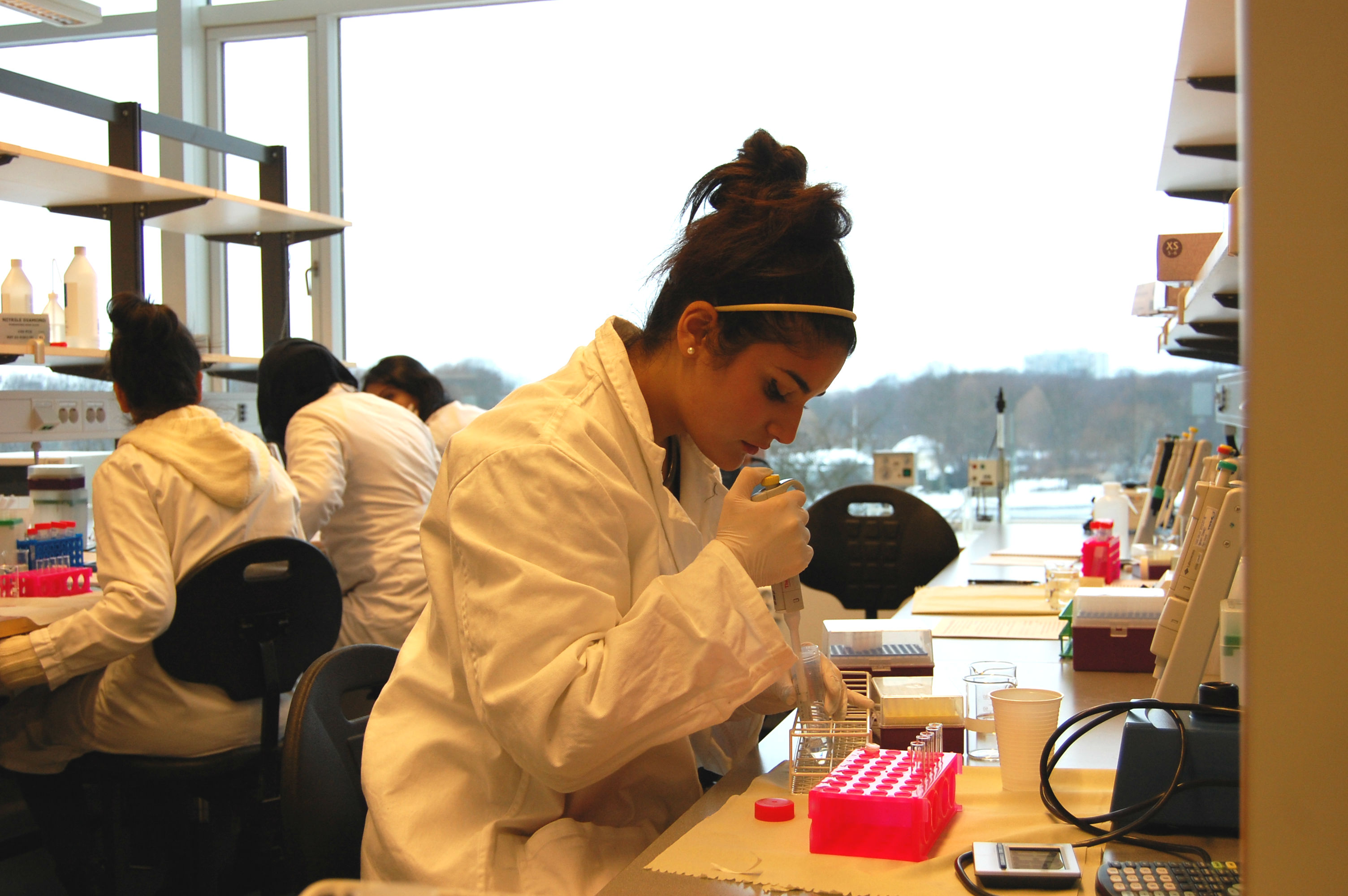
Laboratory

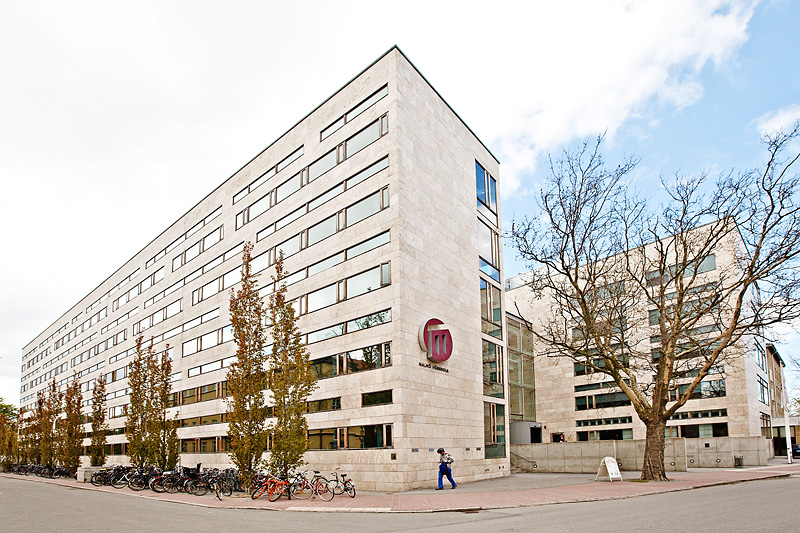
Faculty of Health and Society

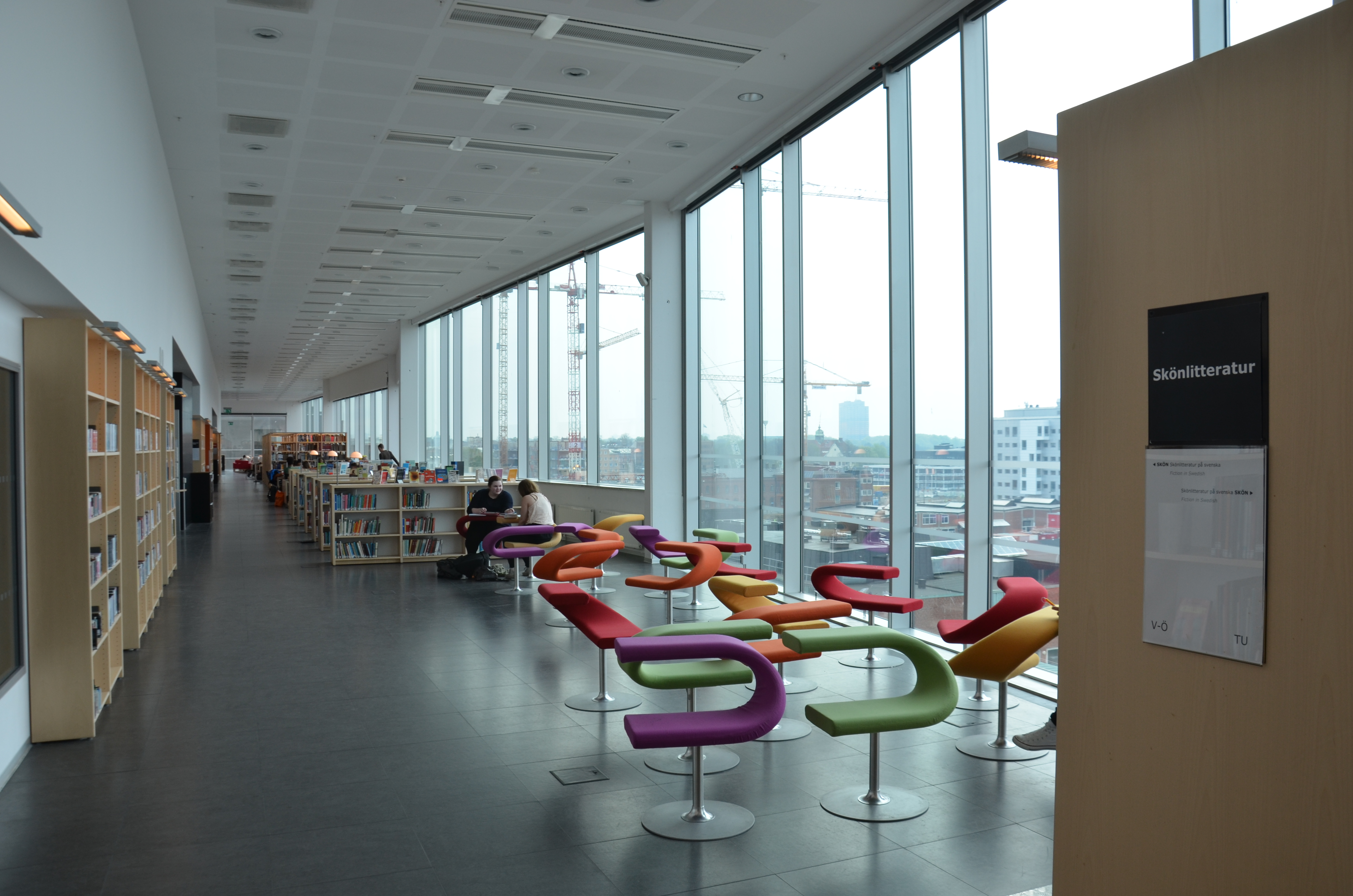
Library

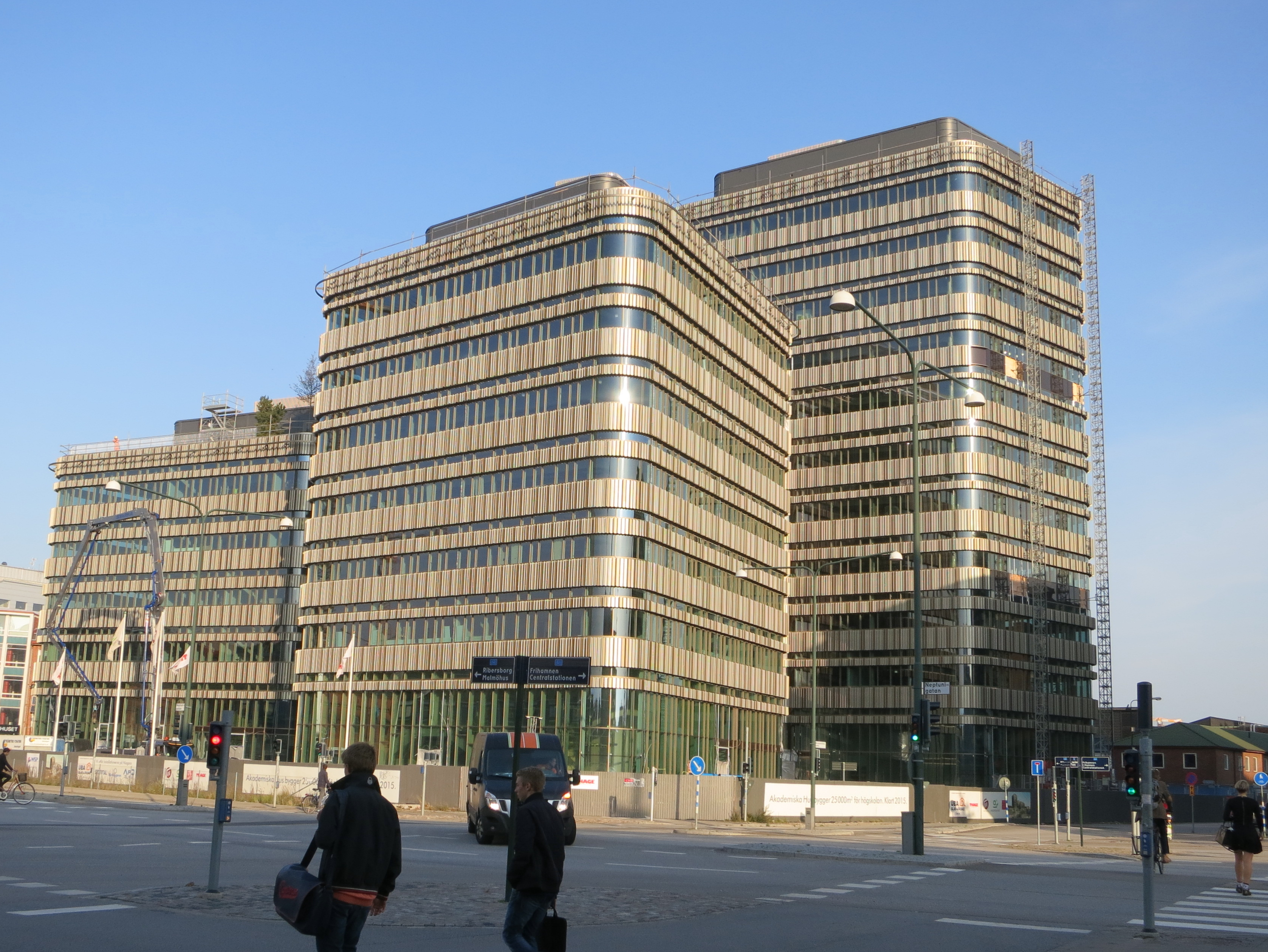
Niagara building

== Faculties ==
Malmö University has five faculties, all of which are accredited multi-disciplinary research areas:

- The Faculty of Technology and Society is located in the building Niagara, close to Malmö Central Station. The faculty has approximately 3,000 students and 100 employees and holds the Department of Computer Science and the Department of Media Technology and Product Design. The courses and degree programmes range from Engineering and Computer Science to Product Development and Design and Media Technology. Research focuses on Computer Science, Materials Science, Applied Mathematics and Media Technology.
- The Faculty of Culture and Society is situated in the building Niagara. The faculty has 4,900 students and around 300 employees. It is composed of four institutes: the Department of Global Political Studies, the Department of Urban Studies, the School of Arts and Communication and the Department of Language and Linguistics. Three of Malmö University's priority educational and research fields are part of this faculty: Urban Studies, which focuses on sustainable environments and global processes of change; New Media, which is oriented towards the interplay between new media, public spheres and forms of expression; and Migration, which conducts research on international migration processes and their causes and effects.
- The Faculty of Education and Society is one of the largest teacher training facilities in Sweden. It has about 5,000 students and 260 employees and is placed right next to the Malmö Central Station in the building Orkanen. It consists of the departments “Children, Youth and Society”, “Culture, Languages and Media”, “Individual and Society”, “School Development and Leadership” as well as “Science, Environment, Society” and “Sport Sciences – Sport and Leisure”. The teacher education ranges from pre-school teaching to the upper secondary school/high school levels. Research conducted by the faculty deals with the theory and practice of teaching and education, child and youth development and education, culture and aesthetics in the school, educational science, informal learning, learning via dialogue, professional development, sport in learning and society, social historical and cultural perspectives in modern history.
- The Faculty of Odontology is located next to the train station Triangeln in Malmö. Its educational programmes lead to a degree as a dental hygienist, dentist or dental technician. The research spans through a broad spectrum: from molecular biological studies of oral tissues to wide-ranging studies of oral health in different generations, social classes and international cultures. The dental clinic is one of the region's largest with more than 10,000 patients each year.
- The Faculty of Health and Society has approximately 4,600 students and 260 employees and is mainly situated on grounds of the university hospital in Malmö. It consists of the five departments “Biomedical Science”, “Care Science”, “Criminology”, “Health and Welfare Studies” and the “Department of Social Work”. The education and research activities at the faculty aim at contributing to the knowledge base in order to preserve, support and promote people's physical, psychological and social health. The faculty educates nurses, social workers, public health scientists and biomedical scientists. Research is being done in Biomedical Laboratory Science/- Technology, Nursing and Social Work.

== Key research areas ==
- Biofilms and bio-interfaces
- Computer science
- Criminology
- Educational science
- Health and social conditions
- Information technology
- Materials science
- Migration and international relations
- New media
- Odontology
- Sports science
- Sustainable urban development
- Leadership
