= Vance George =

American conductor

- Born: 1933; Nappanee, Indiana

Vance George (born 1933) is an American choral conductor from Nappanee, Indiana.

A protégé of Margaret Hillis, Vance George served as choral director of the San Francisco Symphony Chorus for 23 years (1983–2006).

As guest conductor of the San Francisco Symphony, he led performances of Bach's Mass in B Minor, St Matthew Passion, and St John Passion.

Under his leadership, the Chorus won four Grammy Awards, including Best Choral Album (for Brahms' A German Requiem and Orff's Carmina Burana) and Classical Album of the Year. The SFS Chorus was also nominated for a fifth Grammy (Best Crossover Recording, Christmas by the Bay).

The SFS Chorus won its first Emmy Award under George for the 2001 concert production of Stephen Sondheim's Sweeney Todd (broadcast on KQED).

Vance George graduated from Goshen College and Indiana University, and was awarded an honorary doctorate in 1997 by Kent State University. In 1999, Chorus America presented him with a Lifetime Achievement Award. He was inducted as a National Patron of Delta Omicron, an international professional music fraternity on April 3, 2008.
