= Ragnar Bohlin =

Swedish conductor

Ragnar Bohlin is a Swedish conductor born in 1965.

== Director ==
In 2007, Bohlin was appointed as the director of the San Francisco Symphony Chorus. With them he conducted works as Handel's Messiah, Bach's Mass in B minor and Christmas Oratorio, Poulenc's Figure humaine and Orff's Carmina Burana. He is frequently invited as guest conductor and has conducted the Malmö Symphony, the São Paulo Symphony and Chorus, Mendelssohn's Elijah with Fundacion Excelentia in Madrid, and the Swedish Radio Choir and the Nordic Chamber Orchestra in Fredrik Sixten's Requiem. In August 2021, the symphony announced he was resigning after a 14-year career, citing their COVID-19 vaccine mandate as his reason for resignation.

== Education ==
He holds a master's degree in organ and conducting and a postgraduate degree in conducting from the Conservatory of Music in Stockholm. Bohlin studied conducting with choral conductor Eric Ericson, piano with Peter Feuchtwanger in London and voice with the Swedish tenor Nicolai Gedda.

== Appearances ==
He has appeared regularly on Swedish radio and recorded a CD with the Swedish Radio Choir and trombonist/composer Christian Lindberg. He has also worked with the Ericson Chamber Choir and the Royal Opera Choir of Stockholm. He has taught at the Conservatory in Stockholm and has been a visiting professor at Indiana University, Michigan University and Miami University. Since 2009 he teaches at the SF Conservatory of Music. In 2018, Bohlin appeared at the Colyer-Fergusson Music Building at the University of Kent's Canterbury campus to judge the Caritas International Emerging Composer Competition 2018 hosted by the Caritas Chamber Choir.

== Awards ==
In 2009, while he was with the San Francisco Symphony Chorus, they received a Grammy Award for best choral performance. Mahler's Symphony no. 8. Bohlin has been awarded with the Johannes Norrby award for "expanding the horizon of the Swedish choral scene", and in 2013 with the SACC Cultural Award.
