= San Francisco Symphony Chorus =

American chorus (established 1972)

- Also known as: the SFS Chorus
- Origin: San Francisco, California, United States
- Genres: Choral, classical, opera
- Occupation: Chorus
- Instrument: 152 voices
- Years active: 1972-present
- Label: SFS Media
- Members: Music Director; Esa-Pekka Salonen; Chorus Director; Jenny Wong
- Past members: Founder; Seiji Ozawa
- Website: www.sfsymphony.org

The San Francisco Symphony Chorus is the resident Chorus of the San Francisco Symphony (SFS).

== Background ==
Established in 1972 at the request of then-music director Seiji Ozawa, the chorus first performed in the 1973-74 Symphony season. The SFS Chorus today has 152 members and gives a minimum of 26 performances each season at Davies Symphony Hall. They have performed with some of the world's greatest conductors such as Michael Tilson Thomas, Kurt Masur, Neville Marriner, Roger Norrington, and many others.

== Leadership ==
During its first decade, Louis Magor served as the SFS Chorus director. Magor was succeeded in 1982 by the director of the Chicago Symphony Chorus, Margaret Hillis. In 1983, Hillis was succeeded by Vance George who served as Chorus Director for twenty-three years until his retirement in 2006. George was followed by Ragnar Bohlin, who came to the SFS Chorus from Stockholm, Sweden where he was awarded with the prestigious Johannes Norrby medallion in 2006, for expanding the horizon of the Swedish choral community. The current director is Jenny Wong, who also serves as the associate artistic director of the Los Angeles Master Chorale, working alongside Grant Gershon.

== Awards ==
Emmy Award, Outstanding Classical Music-Dance Program

- 2001 Sondheim: Sweeney Todd In Concert, filmed for PBS

Grammy Award for Best Classical Album

- 2000 Stravinsky: Perséphone
- 2004 Mahler: Symphony No. 3
- 2010 Mahler: Symphony No. 8

Grammy Award for Best Choral Performance

- 1992 Orff: Carmina Burana
- 1995 Brahms: Ein deutsches Requiem
- 2010 Mahler: Symphony No. 8

Grammy Award for Best Engineered Album, Classical

- 2010 Mahler: Symphony No. 8

== See also ==
- American Guild of Musical Artists
- San Francisco Opera
