= Vargas & Lagola =

Swedish musical duo

- Origin: Sweden
- Genres: Pop; dance; EDM; soul; jazz
- Occupations: Songwriters; producers; musicians; singers
- Instruments: Vocals; piano; guitar; bass; keyboard; drums; violin
- Years active: 2006–present
- Members: Salem Al Fakir; Vincent Pontare
- Website: vargasandlagola.com

Vargas & Lagola is a Swedish songwriting and production duo of Vincent Pontare and Salem Al Fakir.

They worked with many artists, including Avicii, Axwell & Ingrosso, David Guetta, Galantis, Madonna and Seinabo Sey. In addition to their songwriting and production work, they release alternative pop music.

== Career ==
Vincent Pontare and Salem Al Fakir have gone from successful solo artists to Swedish Grammy Award winning songwriters and producers. Among the first co-writes together are Avicii’s 2013 Billboard Hot 100 single "Hey Brother" and "Younger" by Seinabo Sey.

At the 2014 Swedish Grammy Awards Vargas & Lagola and Magnus Lidehäll were awarded Composer of the Year after writing for Veronica Maggio’s album Handen i fickan fast jag bryr mig and the Petter album Början på allt, and work with artists like Galantis. In 2014 they wrote numerous songs on Mapei’s album Hey Hey and Avicii’s "The Days" and "Divine Sorrow" (with Wyclef Jean). Vargas & Lagola followed up with another successful year in 2015 co-writing most songs on Seinabo Sey’s highly acclaimed debut album Pretend and songs for Madonna’s Rebel Heart album.

Vargas & Lagola have co-written some of the biggest hits by Axwell Ʌ Ingrosso – "More Than You Know", "Sun Is Shining", "Dreamer" and more - taken from their 2017 album More Than You Know.

The duo have also contributed to two songs on Swedish rock band Ghost's Billboard 200-charting and Grammy Award-nominated album Prequelle, including the album's second single "Dance Macabre" which topped Billboard's Mainstream Rock Chart.

In 2018, the same moment as Vargas & Lagola blazed onto the alternative pop scene with the hit single "Roads", they shared the no.1 spot as Sweden's most streamed songwriters for songs including Avicii – "Without You (feat. Sandro Cavazza)" and "Waiting For Love". After working closely with Avicii for several years, Al Fakir and Pontare played a key role in finishing up the 2019 posthumous Avicii album TIM and are featured artists on three of the album songs. On 5 December 2019, Vargas & Lagola performed at Avicii’s Tribute Concert in Stockholm.

Vargas & Lagola's debut album The Butterfly Effect was released in January 2020.

== Discography ==
=== Albums ===
Title	Details	Peak chart positions
Title	Details	SWE
The Butterfly Effect	Released: 31 January 2020; Label: Salem Al Fakir AB / Baby Hurricane AB, Universal Music; Format: Digital download, streaming	16
Mount Alda	Released: 30 October 2020; Label: Salem Al Fakir AB / Baby Hurricane AB, Universal Music; Format: Digital download, streaming	24

=== Singles ===
==== As lead artist ====
List of singles, with selected chart positions, sales figures and certifications
Title	Year	Peak chart positions	Certifications	Album
Title	Year	SWE	Certifications	Album
"Rolling Stone"	2017	—		Non-album single
"Dolores (The Awakening)"	2017	—		Non-album single
"As Long As I Have To"	2017	—		Non-album single
"Sun Is Shining (Band of Gold)"	2017	—		Non-album single
"More Than You Know (Acoustic)" (featuring Agnes)	2017	—		Non-album single
"Roads"	2018	17	GLF: Gold	Non-album single
"Selfish"	2019	—		Non-album single
"Shores" (with Seinabo Sey)	2019	61		Non-album single
"Since 99"	2019	—		The Butterfly Effect
"Forgot to Be Your Lover"	2019	—		The Butterfly Effect
"Somebody That Understands Me" (featuring Ludwig Göransson)	2020	—		The Butterfly Effect
"Hurts to Be Hurt"	2020	— (Note: "Hurts to Be Hurt" did not enter the Swedish Singellista Chart, but peaked at number eight on the Swedish Heatseeker Chart.)		The Butterfly Effect
"Always"	2020	—		Mount Alda
"Suddenly"	2020	—		Mount Alda
"Big Hearted"	2021	—		Mount Alda

==== As featured artist ====
List of songs, with selected chart positions, sales figures and certifications
Title	Year	Peak chart positions		Album
Title	Year	SWE	US Dance	Album
"Friend of Mine" (Avicii featuring Vargas & Lagola)	2017	5	44	Avīci (01)
"Lev nu dö sen" (Petter featuring Vargas & Lagola)	2018	—	—	Lev nu
"Peace of Mind" (Avicii featuring Vargas & Lagola)	2019	17	22	TIM
"Tough Love" (Avicii featuring Agnes, Vargas & Lagola)	2019	2	9	TIM
"Excuse Me Mr. Sir" (Avicii featuring Vargas & Lagola)	2019	30	34	TIM

=== Songwriting and production credits ===
Year	Artist	Title	Album
2012	Swedish House Mafia	"Save The World"	Until Now
2012	Sebastian Ingrosso & Tommy Trash	"Reload"	Non-album single
2012	Dada Life	"Kick Out The Epic Motherf**ker"	Non-album single
2012	Nause	"Hungry Hearts"	Non-album single
2012	Avicii	"Silhouettes"	Non-album single
2013	Katy Perry	"Love Me"	Prism
2013	Avicii	"You Make Me"	True
2013	Avicii	"Hey Brother"	True
2014	John Martin	"Anywhere For You"	Non-album single
2014	Galantis	"Smile"	Galantis (EP)
2014	Galantis	"You"	Galantis (EP)
2014	Galantis	"Help"	Galantis (EP)
2014	Dada Life	"Born To Rage"	Non-album single
2014	Dada Life	"One Smile"	Non-album single
2014	Mapei	"Blame It On Me"	Hey Hey
2014	Mapei	"As 1"	Hey Hey
2014	Mapei	"Second to None"	Hey Hey
2014	Mapei	"Believe"	Hey Hey
2014	Mapei	"Step Up"	Hey Hey
2014	Mapei	"What's Innit 4 Me"	Hey Hey
2014	Wyclef Jean	"Divine Sorrow" (featuring Avicii)	Non-album single
2014	Avicii	"The Days"	The Days/Nights
2014	David Guetta	"Bang My Head" (with Sia)	Listen
2015	Madonna	"HeartBreakCity"	Rebel Heart
2015	Madonna	"Wash All Over Me"	Rebel Heart
2015	Madonna	"Messiah"	Rebel Heart
2015	Madonna	"Rebel Heart"	Rebel Heart
2015	Galantis	"Gold Dust"	Pharmacy
2015	Galantis	"Dancin' To The Sound Of A Broken Heart"	Pharmacy
2015	Galantis	"Kill Em' With The Love"	Pharmacy
2015	Galantis	"Call If You Need Me"	Pharmacy
2015	Galantis	"You"	Pharmacy
2015	Avicii	"Waiting For Love"	Stories
2015	Seinabo Sey	"Younger"	Pretend
2015	Seinabo Sey	"Poetic"	Pretend
2015	Seinabo Sey	"Hard Time"	Pretend
2015	Seinabo Sey	"Easy"	Pretend
2015	Seinabo Sey	"Words"	Pretend
2015	Seinabo Sey	"Sorry"	Pretend
2015	Seinabo Sey	"Still"	Pretend
2015	Seinabo Sey	"Ruin"	Pretend
2015	Seinabo Sey	"Burial"	Pretend
2015	Seinabo Sey	"Pistols At Dawn"	Pretend
2016	MishCatt	"Another Dimension"	Highlighter
2016	Miike Snow	"Heart Is Full"	iii
2017	Johnossi	"On A Roll"	Blood Jungle
2017	Avicii	"Friend Of Mine" (featuring Vargas & Lagola)	Avīci (01)
2017	Avicii	"Without You" (featuring Sandro Cavazza)	Avīci (01)
2017	Toby Radall	"Hold Me Down"	ONE.
2017	Axwell Λ Ingrosso	"More Than You Know"	More Than You Know
2017	Axwell Λ Ingrosso	"Something New"	More Than You Know
2017	Axwell Λ Ingrosso	"This Time"	More Than You Know
2017	Axwell Λ Ingrosso	"Renegade"	More Than You Know
2017	Axwell Λ Ingrosso	"Sun Is Shining"	More Than You Know
2017	Axwell Λ Ingrosso	"On My Way"	More Than You Know
2017	Axwell Λ Ingrosso	"Dreamer"	More Than You Know
2017	Axwell	"Barricade"	More Than You Know
2018	Seinabo Sey	"I Love You"	I'm a Dream
2018	Seinabo Sey	"Never Get Used To"	I'm a Dream
2018	Seinabo Sey	"I Owe You Nothing"	I'm a Dream
2018	Seinabo Sey	"Breathe"	I'm a Dream
2018	Seinabo Sey	"Good In You"	I'm a Dream
2018	Ghost	"Dance Macabre"	Prequelle
2018	Ghost	"Life Eternal"	Prequelle
2018	MagnusTheMagnus	"It Don't Impress Me" (featuring Madi Banja)	Non-album single
2018	MagnusTheMagnus	"Calling" (featuring KIDDO)	Non-album single
2018	David Guetta	"Light Headed" (with Sia)	7
2018	RØMANS	"Glitter & Gold"	Non-album single
2018	Salvatore Ganacci	"Kill A Soundboy" (featuring Nailah Blackman)	Non-album single
2019	Gryffin	"You Remind Me" (featuring Stanaj)	Gravity
2019	Frank Walker & Astrid S	"Only When It Rains"	Non-album single
2019	PRETTYMUCH	"Eyes Off You"	Phases - EP
2019	Avicii	"Peace Of Mind" (featuring Vargas & Lagola)	TIM
2019	Avicii	"Tough Love" (featuring Agnes, Vargas & Lagola)	TIM
2019	Avicii	"Excuse Me Mr Sir" (featuring Vargas & Lagola)	TIM
2019	Otto Knows	"About You"	Non-album single
2019	Ghost	"Kiss The Go-Goat"	Seven Inches of Satanic Panic
2019	Ghost	"Mary On A Cross"	Seven Inches of Satanic Panic
2019	Agnes	"Intro"	Nothing Can Compare
2019	Agnes	"I Trance"	Nothing Can Compare
2019	Agnes	"Not Dangerous"	Nothing Can Compare
2019	Agnes	"Interlude (What Is Wrong)"	Nothing Can Compare
2019	Agnes	"Limelight"	Nothing Can Compare
2019	Agnes	"Interlude (I Like To Sing)"	Nothing Can Compare
2019	Agnes	"Nothing Can Compare"	Nothing Can Compare
2019	Mapei	"Ether"	Sensory Overload
2020	Galantis	"Steel"	Church
2020	Galantis	"Unless It Hurts"	Church
2020	Galantis	"Never Felt A Love Like This" (with Hook n Sling featuring Dotan)	Church
2020	Agnes	"Goodlife"	Non-album single

==== Songwriting and production credits for local Swedish artists ====
Year	Artist	Title	Album
2013	Veronica Maggio	"Sergels torg"	Handen i fickan fast jag bryr mig
2013	Veronica Maggio	"Jag lovar"	Handen i fickan fast jag bryr mig
2013	Veronica Maggio	"Hela huset" (featuring Håkan Hellström)	Handen i fickan fast jag bryr mig
2013	Veronica Maggio	"Va kvar"	Handen i fickan fast jag bryr mig
2013	Veronica Maggio	"Låtsas som det regnar"	Handen i fickan fast jag bryr mig
2013	Veronica Maggio	"Hädanefter"	Handen i fickan fast jag bryr mig
2013	Veronica Maggio	"Dallas"	Handen i fickan fast jag bryr mig
2013	Veronica Maggio	"Bas gillar hörn"	Handen i fickan fast jag bryr mig
2013	Veronica Maggio	"I min bil"	Handen i fickan fast jag bryr mig
2013	Petter	"Mighty" (featuring Newkid)	Början på allt
2013	Petter	"Början på allt" (featuring Eye N'I)	Början på allt
2013	Petter	"April"	Början på allt
2013	Petter	"Håll om mig" (featuring Daniel Adams-Ray)	Början på allt
2013	Petter	"Tills döden skiljer oss åt"	Början på allt
2013	Petter	"King" (featuring Lilla Namo)	Början på allt
2013	Petter	"Maj"	Början på allt
2013	Petter	"Arbete"	Början på allt
2013	Petter	"Alla vet" (featuring Agnes)	Början på allt
2013	Petter	"Fristad"	Början på allt
2013	Petter	"Juni"	Början på allt
2013	Petter	"Sitter på en dröm"	Början på allt
2013	Petter	"Minnen del II"	Början på allt
2013	Petter	"Släpp mig fri"	Början på allt
2016	Veronica Maggio	"Den första är alltid gratis"	Den första är alltid gratis
2016	Veronica Maggio	"Vi mot världen"	Den första är alltid gratis
2016	Veronica Maggio	"Pang pang"	Den första är alltid gratis
2018	Petter	"Kliv på!" (featuring Eye N'I)	Lev nu
2018	Petter	"Lev nu dö sen" (featuring Vargas & Lagola)	Lev nu

== Awards and nominations ==
Year	Awards	Category	Nomination	Outcome	Ref.
2014	Swedish Grammy Awards	Composer of the Year	Vincent Pontare, Salem Al Fakir & Magnus Lidehäll	Won	
2014	The Swedish MPA Awards	International Success of the Year	Vincent Pontare, Salem Al Fakir & Magnus Lidehäll	Nominated	
2015	Swedish Grammy Awards	Composer of the Year	Vincent Pontare, Salem Al Fakir & Magnus Lidehäll	Nominated	
2015	The Swedish MPA Awards	International Success of the Year	Vincent Pontare and Salem Al Fakir	Nominated	
2016	Swedish Grammy Awards	Composer of the Year	Vincent Pontare, Salem Al Fakir, Magnus Lidehäll & Seinabo Sey	Nominated	
2018	Swedish Grammy Awards	Composer of the Year	Vargas & Lagola	Nominated	
2018	The Swedish MPA Awards (together with STIM)	Most Played Song 2017	Axwell Ʌ Ingrosso – "More Than You Know"	Won	
2018	The Swedish MPA Awards	Song of the Year	Avicii - "Without You" (feat. Sandro Cavazza)	Nominated	
2019	The Swedish MPA Awards (together with STIM)	Most Played Song 2018	Avicii - "Without You" (feat. Sandro Cavazza)	Won	
2020	Swedish Grammy Awards	Producer of the Year	Avicii, Vincent Pontare, Salem Al Fakir, Albin Nedler, Kristoffer Fogelmark, Carl Falk, Lucas von Bahder, Marcus Thunberg Wessel	Nominated	
2020	Swedish Grammy Awards	Composer of the Year	Avicii, Vincent Pontare, Salem Al Fakir, Albin Nedler, Kristoffer Fogelmark, Isak Alverus, Carl Falk, Joakim Berg, Lucas von Bahder, Marcus Thunberg Wessel, Martin Svensson	Nominated	
