= More Than You Know =

More Than You Know may refer to:

- "More Than You Know" (Youmans, Rose and Eliscu song), a song written by Vincent Youmans, Billy Rose and Edward Eliscu in 1929
- "More Than You Know" (Martika song)
- More Than You Know (Out of Eden album), or the title song
- More Than You Know (Dexter Gordon album)
- "More Than You Know", a song by Chong Nee
- More Than You Know, an EP by Axwell & Ingrosso
- More Than You Know (Axwell & Ingrosso album), debut studio album by Axwell & Ingrosso
  - "More Than You Know" (Axwell & Ingrosso song), the title song
- "More Than You Know" (Blink-182 song)
