= Pontare =

Pontare is a surname and may refer to:

- Roger Pontare (born Roger Johansson; 1951), Swedish musician
- Vincent Pontare (born 1980), Swedish songwriter, producer, and singer also known by the mononym Vincent. He is also part of a songwriting, producing duo Vargas & Lagola alongside Salem Al Fakir with Pontare being Vargas
