= Dreamer (Axwell & Ingrosso song) =

2017 song by Axwell & Ingrosso featuring Trevor Guthrie

Single by Axwell & Ingrosso featuring Trevor Guthrie

from the album More Than You Know
- Released: 8 December 2017
- Recorded: 2017
- Genre: EDM; dance-pop
- Length: 4:11
- Label: Def Jam
- Songwriter(s): Sebastian Ingrosso; Salem Al Fakir; Axel Hedfors; Vincent Pontare; Elof Loelv
- Producer(s): Sebastian Ingrosso; Axel Hedfors

Axwell & Ingrosso singles chronology
"More Than You Know" (2017)	"Dreamer" (2017)	"Dancing Alone" (2018)

Trevor Guthrie singles chronology
"Wanted" (2016)	"Dreamer" (2017)	"Won't Hold Me Down (Gravity)" (2018)

Music video
- "Dreamer" on YouTube

"Dreamer" is a song by Swedish dance music duo Axwell & Ingrosso featuring Canadian singer-songwriter Trevor Guthrie. The song was released on 8 December 2017. A progressive house remix was released by Russian dance music duo Matisse and Sadko on 2 February 2018.

== Charts ==
=== Weekly charts ===
Chart (2017–18)	Peak position
Austria (Ö3 Austria Top 40)	20
Belgium (Ultratip Bubbling Under Flanders)	2
Belgium (Ultratop 50 Wallonia)	18
France (SNEP)	159
Germany (GfK)	34
Hungary (Dance Top 40)	14
Hungary (Rádiós Top 40)	25
Netherlands (Dutch Top 40)	12
Netherlands (Single Top 100)	38
Norway (VG-lista)	20
Sweden (Sverigetopplistan)	17
Switzerland (Schweizer Hitparade)	44
US Dance Club Songs (Billboard)	6
US Hot Dance/Electronic Songs (Billboard)	16

=== Year-end charts ===
Chart (2018)	Position
Belgium (Ultratop Wallonia)	100
Hungary (Dance Top 40)	46
Hungary (Rádiós Top 40)	65
Netherlands (Dutch Top 40)	43
Sweden (Sverigetopplistan)	86
US Hot Dance/Electronic Songs (Billboard)	57
Chart (2019)	Position
Hungary (Dance Top 40)	61

== Certifications ==
Region	Certification	Certified units/sales
Brazil (Pro-Música Brasil)	Gold	20,000^{‡}
France (SNEP)	Gold	100,000^{‡}
Germany (BVMI)	Gold	200,000^{‡}
Italy (FIMI)	Gold	25,000^{‡}
Streaming
Sweden (GLF)	2× Platinum	16,000,000^{†}
^{‡} Sales+streaming figures based on certification alone.^{†} Streaming-only figures based on certification alone.
