= Vincent Pontare =

Swedish singer and songwriter

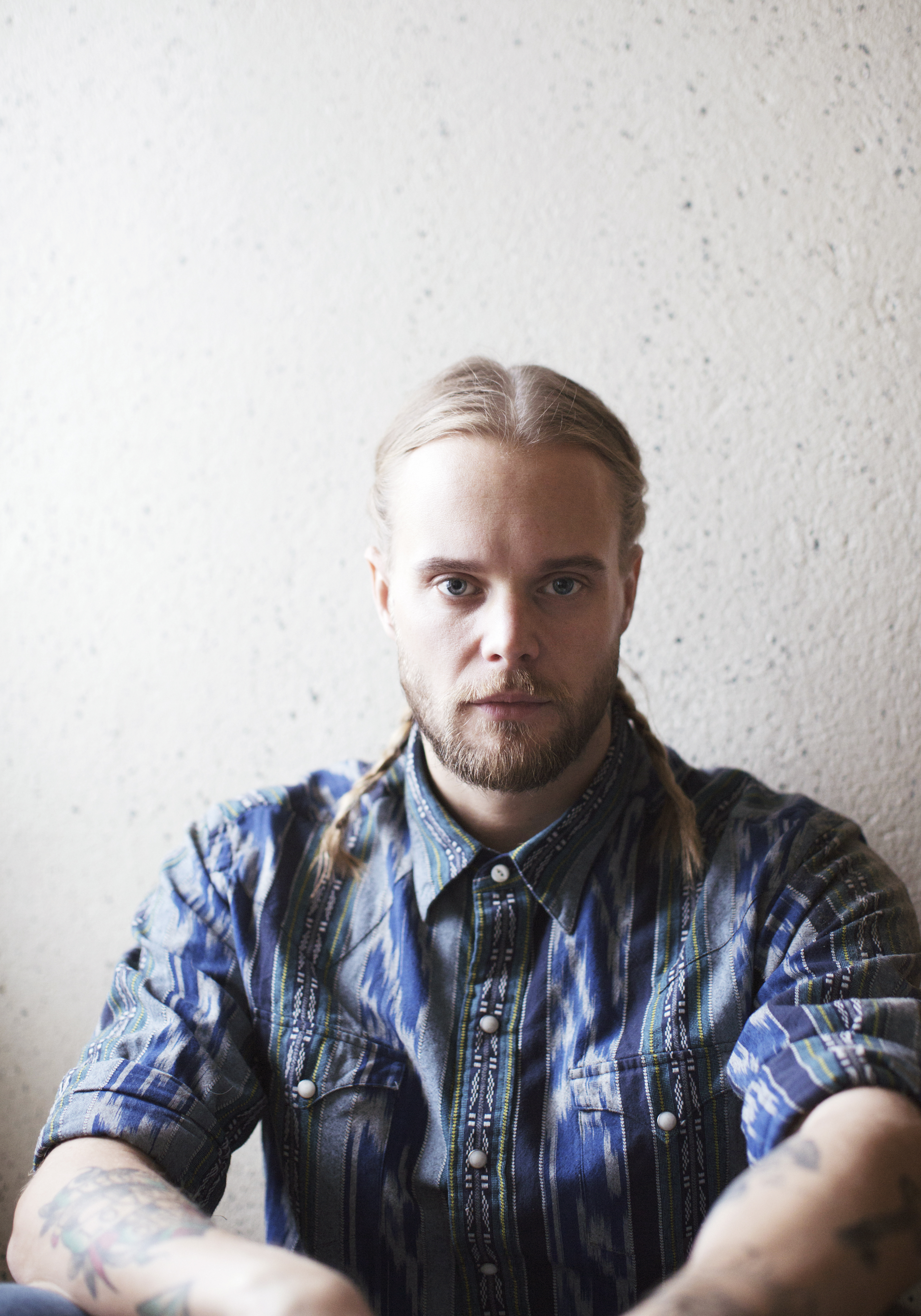

Background information
- Also known as: Vargas
- Born: Fred Vincent Pontare; 13 May 1980 (age 46)
- Origin: Solna, Sweden
- Genres: Pop; dance; EDM
- Occupations: Songwriter; producer; musician; singer
- Instrument: Vocals
- Years active: 2006–present
- Label: Universal
- Website: vargasandlagola.com

Fred Vincent Pontare (born 13 May 1980) is a Swedish songwriter, producer, and singer. He is also known by the mononym Vincent. He regularly collaborates with Salem Al Fakir as songwriting, producer, and duo Vargas & Lagola. Together, they have worked with many pre-eminent artists, including: Avicii, Axwell Ʌ Ingrosso, Madonna, Seinabo Sey and Lady Gaga. In addition to their songwriting and production work, they release alternative pop music as Vargas & Lagola.

In August 2017, they were featured artists on Avicii's "Friend of Mine" from EP Avīci (01) which they co-wrote.

== Career ==
Vincent Pontare started his musical career a solo artist under the mononym Vincent releasing his debut single "Paradise" in 2006 and the albums Lucky Thirteen (2007) and Godspeed (2011). Other hits as Vincent included "Don't Hate on Me", "Miss Blue" and "Baby Hurricane". In 2008 Pontare won the STIM Platinum guitar prize. His career in writing songs for other artists began to gain momentum in 2012 when he co-wrote Swedish House Mafia’s "Save The World" and "Reload" performed by Sebastian Ingrosso & Tommy Trash.

Among the first co-writes with Salem Al Fakir are Avicii’s 2013 Billboard Hot 100 single "Hey Brother" and "Younger" by Seinabo Sey. On Katy Perry's 2013 album Prism he co-wrote and produced "Love Me" with Bloodshy, Magnus Lidehäll and Camela Leierth.

At the 2014 Swedish Grammy Awards Vincent Pontare, Salem Al Fakir and Magnus Lidehäll were awarded Composer of the Year after writing for Veronica Maggio’s album Handen i fickan fast jag bryr mig and the Petter album Början på allt, and work with artists like Galantis. In 2014 he wrote numerous songs on Mapei’s album Hey Hey and Avicii’s "The Days" and "Divine Sorrow" (with Wyclef Jean). Pontare followed up with another successful year in 2015 co-writing most songs on Seinabo Sey’s highly acclaimed debut album Pretend and songs for Madonna’s Rebel Heart album. He also collaborated on David Guetta's single "Bang My Head" with Sia and Fetty Wap.

Vargas & Lagola have co-written some of the biggest hits by Axwell Ʌ Ingrosso – "More Than You Know", "Sun Is Shining", "Dreamer" and more – taken from their 2017 album More Than You Know. The duo have also contributed to two songs on Swedish rock band Ghost's Billboard 200-charting and Grammy Award-nominated album Prequelle, including the album's second single "Dance Macabre" which topped Billboard's Mainstream Rock Chart.

In 2018, the same moment as Vargas & Lagola blazed onto the alternative pop scene with the hit single "Roads", they shared the no.1 spot as Sweden's most streamed songwriters for songs including Avicii – "Without You" (featuring Sandro Cavazza) and "Waiting For Love". After working closely with Avicii for several years, Al Fakir and Pontare played a key role in finishing up the 2019 posthumous Avicii album TIM and are featured artists on three of the album songs. On 5 December 2019, Vargas & Lagola performed at Avicii's Tribute Concert in Stockholm.

Vargas & Lagola's debut album The Butterfly Effect was released in January 2020.

== Personal life ==
Vincent Pontare is the son of the renowned Swedish musician Roger Pontare (born Roger Johansson). Vincent has a brother called Viktor Pontare.

Vincent Pontare is married to Agnes, whom he has been dating since 2009.

== Discography ==
=== As Vargas & Lagola ===
- 2020: The Butterfly Effect

=== As solo artist ===
==== Albums ====
Year	Album	Peak position (SWE)	Certification
2007	Lucky Thirteen: Release date: 7 November 2007; Label: Little Stereo Recordings; Singles: 2006: "Paradise"; 2007: "Don't Hate on Me"; 2008: "Miss Blue"	25	
2011	Godspeed: Release date: 29 August 2011; Label: Little Stereo Recordings; Distribution: Warner Music Sweden; Singles: 2010: "Baby Hurricane"; 2011: "The Moment I Met You"; 2011: "Put Your Money Where Your Money Is"	–	

==== Singles ====
Year	Single	Peak position				Album
Year	Single	SWE	FIN	GER	SWI	Album
2006	"Paradise"	23	–	–	–	Lucky Thirteen
2007	"Don't Hate on Me"	7	–	–	–	Lucky Thirteen
2008	"Miss Blue"	6	19	39	23	Lucky Thirteen
2008	"This Is for You"	–	–	74	–	Non album release
2010	"Baby Hurricane"	–	–	–	–	Godspeed
2011	"The Moment I Met You"	–	–	–	–	Godspeed
2011	"Put Your Money Where Your Money Is"	–	–	–	–	Godspeed

=== Songwriting and production credits ===
Year	Artist	Title	Album
2005	Agnes	"I Believe"	Agnes
2009	Matt Dusk	"Don't Hate on Me"	Good News
2011	Agnes	"Don't Go Breaking My Heart"	Non-album single
2012	Swedish House Mafia	"Save The World"	Until Now
2012	Sebastian Ingrosso & Tommy Trash	"Reload"	Non-album single
2012	Dada Life	"Kick Out the Epic Motherfucker"	The Rules of Dada
2012	Nause	"Hungry Hearts"	Non-album single
2012	Agnes	"All I Want Is You"	Veritas
2012	Agnes	"Human Touch"	Veritas
2012	Agnes	"Got Me Good"	Veritas
2012	Agnes	"Nothing Else Matters"	Veritas
2013	Katy Perry	"Love Me"	Prism
2013	Avicii	"You Make Me"	True
2013	Avicii	"Hey Brother"	True
2014	John Martin	"Anywhere For You"	Non-album single
2014	Galantis	"Smile"	Galantis (EP)
2014	Galantis	"You"	Galantis (EP)
2014	Galantis	"Help"	Galantis (EP)
2014	Dada Life	"Born To Rage"	Non-album single
2014	Dada Life	"One Smile"	Non-album single
2014	Mapei	"Blame It On Me"	Hey Hey
2014	Mapei	"Believe"	Hey Hey
2014	Mapei	"What's Innit 4 Me"	Hey Hey
2014	Wyclef Jean	"Divine Sorrow" (featuring Avicii)	Non-album single
2014	Avicii	"The Days"	The Days/Nights
2014	David Guetta	"Bang My Head" (with Sia)	Listen
2015	Madonna	"HeartBreakCity"	Rebel Heart
2015	Madonna	"Wash All Over Me"	Rebel Heart
2015	Madonna	"Messiah"	Rebel Heart
2015	Madonna	"Rebel Heart"	Rebel Heart
2015	Sharks	"The Rebel"	Non-album single
2015	Galantis	"Gold Dust"	Pharmacy
2015	Galantis	"Dancin' To The Sound Of A Broken Heart"	Pharmacy
2015	Galantis	"Kill Em' With The Love"	Pharmacy
2015	Galantis	"Call If You Need Me"	Pharmacy
2015	Galantis	"You"	Pharmacy
2015	Avicii	"Waiting for Love"	Stories
2015	Seinabo Sey	"Younger"	Pretend
2015	Seinabo Sey	"Poetic"	Pretend
2015	Seinabo Sey	"Hard Time"	Pretend
2015	Seinabo Sey	"Sorry"	Pretend
2015	Seinabo Sey	"Ruin"	Pretend
2015	Seinabo Sey	"Pistols At Dawn"	Pretend
2016	MishCatt	"Another Dimension"	Highlighter
2016	Miike Snow	"Heart Is Full"	iii
2017	Johnossi	"On A Roll"	Blood Jungle
2017	Avicii	"Friend of Mine" (featuring Vargas & Lagola)	Avīci (01)
2017	Avicii	"Without You" (featuring Sandro Cavazza)	Avīci (01)
2017	Toby Radall	"Hold You Down"	ONE.
2017	Axwell Ʌ Ingrosso	"More Than You Know"	More Than You Know
2017	Axwell Ʌ Ingrosso	"Something New"	More Than You Know
2017	Axwell Ʌ Ingrosso	"This Time"	More Than You Know
2017	Axwell Ʌ Ingrosso	"Renegade"	More Than You Know
2017	Axwell Ʌ Ingrosso	"Sun Is Shining"	More Than You Know
2017	Axwell Ʌ Ingrosso	"On My Way"	More Than You Know
2017	Axwell Ʌ Ingrosso	"Dreamer"	More Than You Know
2017	Axwell	"Barricade"	More Than You Know
2018	Seinabo Sey	"I Love You"	I'm a Dream
2018	Seinabo Sey	"Never Get Used To"	I'm a Dream
2018	Seinabo Sey	"I Owe You Nothing"	I'm a Dream
2018	Seinabo Sey	"Breathe"	I'm a Dream
2018	Seinabo Sey	"Good In You"	I'm a Dream
2018	Ghost	"Dance Macabre"	Prequelle
2018	Ghost	"Life Eternal"	Prequelle
2018	MagnusTheMagnus	"It Don't Impress Me" (featuring Madi Banja)	Non-album single
2018	MagnusTheMagnus	"Calling" (featuring KIDDO)	Non-album single
2018	David Guetta	"Light Headed" (with Sia)	7
2018	RØMANS	"Glitter & Gold"	Non-album single
2018	Salvatore Ganacci	"Kill A Soundboy" (featuring Nailah Blackman)	Non-album single
2019	Gryffin	"You Remind Me" (featuring Stanaj)	Gravity
2019	Frank Walker & Astrid S	"Only When It Rains"	Non-album single
2019	PRETTYMUCH	"Eyes Off You"	Phases - EP
2019	Avicii	"Peace of Mind" (featuring Vargas & Lagola)	TIM
2019	Avicii	"Tough Love" (featuring Agnes, Vargas & Lagola)	TIM
2019	Avicii	"Excuse Me Mr Sir" (featuring Vargas & Lagola)	TIM
2019	Otto Knows	"About You"	Non-album single
2019	Ghost	"Kiss The Go-Goat"	Seven Inches of Satanic Panic
2019	Ghost	"Mary On A Cross"	Seven Inches of Satanic Panic
2019	Agnes	"Intro"	Nothing Can Compare
2019	Agnes	"I Trance"	Nothing Can Compare
2019	Agnes	"Not Dangerous"	Nothing Can Compare
2019	Agnes	"Interlude (What Is Wrong)"	Nothing Can Compare
2019	Agnes	"Limelight"	Nothing Can Compare
2019	Agnes	"Interlude (I Like To Sing)"	Nothing Can Compare
2019	Agnes	"Nothing Can Compare"	Nothing Can Compare
2019	Mapei	"Ether"	Sensory Overload
2020	Lady Gaga	"Chromatica III"	Chromatica
2020	Lady Gaga	"Sine From Above" (with Elton John)	Chromatica
2020	Galantis	"Steel"	Church
2020	Galantis	"Unless It Hurts"	Church
2020	Galantis	"Never Felt A Love Like This" (with Hook n Sling featuring Dotan)	Church
2020	Agnes	"Goodlife"	Non-album single
2021	Agnes	"Spriritual Awakening"	Magic Still Exists
2021	Agnes	"XX"	Magic Still Exists
2021	Agnes	"24 Hours"	Magic Still Exists
2021	Agnes	"Freedom"	Magic Still Exists
2021	Agnes	"Here Comes The Night"	Magic Still Exists
2021	Agnes	"Love And Appreciation"	Magic Still Exists
2021	Agnes	"The Soul Has No Gender"	Magic Still Exists
2021	Agnes	"Selfmade"	Magic Still Exists
2021	Agnes	"Fingers Crossed"	Magic Still Exists
2021	Agnes	"Free Your Mind And Free Your Body"	Magic Still Exists
2021	Agnes	"Magic Still Exists"	Magic Still Exists
2022	Ghost	"Spillways"	Impera
2022	Ghost	"Watcher In The Sky"	Impera
2022	Ghost	"Dominion"	Impera
2022	Ghost	"Twenties"	Impera
2022	Ghost	"Darkness At the Heart Of My Love"	Impera
2022	Swedish House Mafia	"Time" (featuring Mapei)	Paradise Again
2022	Swedish House Mafia	"Frankenstein" (featuring ASAP Rocky)	Paradise Again
2022	Swedish House Mafia	"Lifetime" (with Ty Dolla Sign & 070 Shake)	Paradise Again
2022	Swedish House Mafia	"Another Minute"	Paradise Again
2024	Jelly Roll	"When The Drugs Don't Work" (with Ilsey)	Beautifully Broken (album)
2024	Ghost	"The Future Is A Foreign Land"	Rite Here Rite Now (Original Motion Picture Soundtrack)
2024	Empire Of The Sun	"Changes"	Ask That God
2024	Empire Of The Sun	"Cherry Blossom"	Ask That God
2024	Empire Of The Sun	"Television"	Ask That God
2024	Benjamin Ingrosso	"..and so it begins"	Pink Velvet Theatre
2024	Benjamin Ingrosso	"Kite"	Pink Velvet Theatre
2024	Benjamin Ingrosso	"Angela"	Pink Velvet Theatre
2024	Benjamin Ingrosso	"PVT?"	Pink Velvet Theatre
2024	Benjamin Ingrosso	"Better Days"	Pink Velvet Theatre
2024	Benjamin Ingrosso	"All My Life - and then..."	Pink Velvet Theatre
2024	Benjamin Ingrosso	"IKNOW IKNOW"	Pink Velvet Theatre
2024	Benjamin Ingrosso	"All The Stars - Interlude"	Pink Velvet Theatre
2024	Benjamin Ingrosso	"Back To You"	Pink Velvet Theatre
2024	Benjamin Ingrosso	"so this is love?"	Pink Velvet Theatre
2024	Griff	"Tears For Fun"	Vertigo
2025	Ghost	"Peacefield"	Skeletá
2025	Ghost	"Satanized"	Skeletá
2025	Ghost	"Marks Of The Evil One"	Skeletá
2025	Tom Grennan	"Full Attention"	Everywhere I Went, Led Me to Where I Didn't Want to Be
2025	Christopher	"When We Were Young"	A Beautiful Real Life Soundtrack
2025	Christopher	"Orbit"	Fools Gold
2025	Christopher	"ONE"	Fools Gold
2025	Drew Sycamore	"Lost Myself"	Occurrent Affairs
2025	Drew Sycamore	"Change The World"	Occurrent Affairs
2025	Drew Sycamore	"Another Lovesong"	Occurrent Affairs
2025	Drew Sycamore	"Lonely Heat"	Occurrent Affairs
2025	Drew Sycamore	"Materialisation (interlude)"	Occurrent Affairs
2025	Drew Sycamore	"Spring Birds"	Occurrent Affairs
2026	Agnes	"BM-247 01 INTERLUDE"	BEAUTIFUL MADNESS
2026	Agnes	"BEAUTIFUL MADNESS"	BEAUTIFUL MADNESS
2026	Agnes	"TRIGGER"	BEAUTIFUL MADNESS
2026	Agnes	"GOT ANY?"	BEAUTIFUL MADNESS
2026	Agnes	"MILK"	BEAUTIFUL MADNESS
2026	Agnes	"WAKE UP"	BEAUTIFUL MADNESS
2026	Agnes	"BALENCIAGA COVERED EYES"	BEAUTIFUL MADNESS
2026	Agnes	"EGO"	BEAUTIFUL MADNESS
2026	Agnes	"MASTERPIECE"	BEAUTIFUL MADNESS
2026	Agnes	"SIGN IT"	BEAUTIFUL MADNESS
2026	Agnes	"PRE"	BEAUTIFUL MADNESS
2026	Agnes	"LOVESONGS"	BEAUTIFUL MADNESS
2026	Carly Rae Jepsen	"Blue Skies"	Day and Night
2026	Carly Rae Jepsen	"Burning Heart"	Day and Night

==== Songwriting and production credits for local Swedish artists ====
Year	Artist	Title	Album
2007	Danny	"If Only You"	Heart Beats
2008	Amanda Jenssen	"Do You Love Me?"	Killing My Darlings
2010	Andreas Grega	"Dom hade mycket att säga"	En sak i taget
2013	Veronica Maggio	"Sergels torg"	Handen i fickan fast jag bryr mig
2013	Veronica Maggio	"Jag lovar"	Handen i fickan fast jag bryr mig
2013	Veronica Maggio	"Hela huset" (featuring Håkan Hellström)	Handen i fickan fast jag bryr mig
2013	Veronica Maggio	"Va kvar"	Handen i fickan fast jag bryr mig
2013	Veronica Maggio	"Låtsas som det regnar"	Handen i fickan fast jag bryr mig
2013	Veronica Maggio	"Hädanefter"	Handen i fickan fast jag bryr mig
2013	Veronica Maggio	"Dallas"	Handen i fickan fast jag bryr mig
2013	Veronica Maggio	"Bas gillar hörn"	Handen i fickan fast jag bryr mig
2013	Veronica Maggio	"I min bil"	Handen i fickan fast jag bryr mig
2013	Petter	"Mighty" (featuring Newkid)	Början på allt
2013	Petter	"Början på allt" (featuring Eye N'I)	Början på allt
2013	Petter	"April"	Början på allt
2013	Petter	"Håll om mig" (featuring Daniel Adams-Ray)	Början på allt
2013	Petter	"Tills döden skiljer oss åt"	Början på allt
2013	Petter	"King" (featuring Lilla Namo)	Början på allt
2013	Petter	"Maj"	Början på allt
2013	Petter	"Arbete"	Början på allt
2013	Petter	"Alla vet" (featuring Agnes)	Början på allt
2013	Petter	"Fristad"	Början på allt
2013	Petter	"Juni"	Början på allt
2013	Petter	"Sitter på en dröm"	Början på allt
2013	Petter	"Minnen del II"	Början på allt
2013	Petter	"Släpp mig fri"	Början på allt
2013	Rasmus Seebach	"I min t-shirt"	Ingen kan love dig i morgen
2016	Veronica Maggio	"Den första är alltid gratis"	Den första är alltid gratis
2016	Veronica Maggio	"Vi mot världen"	Den första är alltid gratis
2016	Veronica Maggio	"Pang pang"	Den första är alltid gratis
2018	Petter	"Kliv på!" (featuring Eye N'I)	Lev nu
2018	Petter	"Lev nu dö sen" (featuring Vargas & Lagola)	Lev nu

== Awards and nominations ==
Year	Awards	Category	Nomination	Outcome	Ref.
2008	Swedish Grammy Awards	Best Newcomer	Himself	Nominated	
2008	Swedish Grammy Awards	Producer of the Year	Himself	Nominated	
2008	Swedish Grammy Awards	Best Dance/Hiphop/Soul	Himself	Nominated	
2014	Swedish Grammy Awards	Composer of the Year	Himself (with Salem Al Fakir & Magnus Lidehäll)	Won	
2014	The Swedish MPA Awards	International Success of the Year	Himself (with Salem Al Fakir & Magnus Lidehäll)	Nominated	
2015	Swedish Grammy Awards	Composer of the Year	Himself (with Salem Al Fakir & Magnus Lidehäll)	Nominated	
2015	The Swedish MPA Awards	International Success of the Year	Himself (with Salem Al Fakir)	Nominated	
2016	Swedish Grammy Awards	Composer of the Year	Himself (with Salem Al Fakir, Magnus Lidehäll & Seinabo Sey)	Nominated	
2018	Swedish Grammy Awards	Composer of the Year	Vargas & Lagola	Nominated	
2018	The Swedish MPA Awards (together with STIM)	Most Played Song 2017	Axwell Ʌ Ingrosso – "More Than You Know"	Won	
2018	The Swedish MPA Awards	Song of the Year	Avicii - "Without You" (feat. Sandro Cavazza)	Nominated	
2019	Grammy Awards	Best Rock Album	Ghost - Prequelle	Nominated	
2019	The Swedish MPA Awards (together with STIM)	Most Played Song 2018	Avicii - "Without You" (feat. Sandro Cavazza)	Won	
2020	Grammy Awards	Best Pop Vocal Album	Lady Gaga - Chromatica	Nominated	
2020	Swedish Grammy Awards	Producer of the Year	Himself Tim Bergling, Salem Al Fakir, Albin Nedler, Kristoffer Fogelmark, Carl Falk, Lucas von Bahder, Marcus Thunberg Wessel	Nominated	
2020	Swedish Grammy Awards	Composer of the Year	Himself, Tim Bergling, Salem Al Fakir, Albin Nedler, Kristoffer Fogelmark, Isak Alverus, Carl Falk, Joakim Berg, Lucas von Bahder, Marcus Thunberg Wessel, Martin Svensson	Nominated	
2022	Swedish Grammy Awards	Composer of the Year	Himself, Agnes, Salem Al Fakir, Kerstin Ljungström, Maria Hazell	Won	
2022	Swedish Grammy Awards	Album of the Year	Agnes - Magic Still Exists	Nominated	
2022	Swedish Grammy Awards	Best Pop	Agnes - Magic Still Exists	Nominated	
2022	The Swedish MPA Awards	Composer of the Year	Himself, Agnes, Salem Al Fakir, Kerstin Ljungström, Maria Hazell	Nominated	
2022	The Swedish MPA Awards	International Success	Himself, Tobias Forge, Klas Åhlund, Salem Al Fakir, Joakim Berg, Max Grahn	Nominated	
2023	Swedish Grammy Awards	Composer of the Year	Himself,Salem Al Fakir	Nominated	
2023	Swedish Grammy Awards	Best Electronic/Dance	Swedish House Mafia - Paradise Again	Won	
2023	Swedish Grammy Awards	Best Hard Rock/Metal	Ghost - Impera	Won	
2024	The Swedish MPA Awards	Song of the Year	Benjamin Ingrosso - "Kite"	Nominated	
2025	Swedish Grammy Awards	Album of the Year	Benjamin Ingrosso - Pink Velvet Theatre	Won	
2025	Swedish Grammy Awards	Composer of the Year	Himself, Salem Al Fakir, Benjamin Ingrosso	Nominated	
2025	Swedish Grammy Awards	Best Pop	Benjamin Ingrosso - Pink Velvet Theatre	Nominated	
2025	The Swedish MPA Awards	International Success	Himself, Tobias Forge, Salem Al Fakir, Max Grahn	Won	
2026	Grammy Awards	Best Contemporary Country Album	Jelly Roll - Beautifully Broken	Won	
2026	Swedish Grammy Awards	Album of the Year	Ghost - Skeletá	Nominated	
2026	Swedish Grammy Awards	Composer of the Year	Himself, Tobias Forge, Salem Al Fakir, Max Grahn	Nominated	
2026	Swedish Grammy Awards	Producer of the Year	Himself, Tobias Forge, Salem Al Fakir, Max Grahn	Nominated	
2026	Swedish Grammy Awards	Lyricist of the Year	Himself, Tobias Forge, Salem Al Fakir, Max Grahn	Nominated	
2026	Swedish Grammy Awards	Best Hard Rock/Metal	Ghost - Skeletá	Nominated	
