= More Than You Know (Axwell & Ingrosso album) =

2017 compilation/studio album by Axwell & Ingrosso

- The compilation/studio album's cover. The EP cover shows a similar shot but without both members.

Studio album / Compilation album by Axwell & Ingrosso
- Released: 8 December 2017
- Recorded: 2014–2017
- Genres: Electropop; dance-pop; EDM
- Length: 55:48 (physical edition); 59:59 (digital edition)
- Labels: Axtone; Refune; Virgin; Def Jam
- Producers: Axwell; Sebastian Ingrosso; Richard Zastenker; Emir Kobilic

Axwell & Ingrosso chronology
More Than You Know (EP) (2017)	More Than You Know (2017)

Singles from More Than You Know
- 1. "Renegade" Released: 12 May 2017; 2. "More Than You Know" Released: 26 May 2017; 3. "Dreamer" Released: 8 December 2017

More Than You Know is the first compilation album (Note: Categorized as a compilation album on some streaming services.) and debut studio album by Swedish electronic dance music duo Axwell & Ingrosso, released on 8 December 2017 through Axtone Records, Refune Music, Virgin Records and Def Jam Recordings. The song "Renegade" served as the lead single on both the EP and the compilation/studio album.

== Background ==
The album was in the making since 2014. It was stated numerous times that it would be released in November 2016 and February 2017, although this never came to fruition. The album contains all of Axwell and Ingrosso's previously released singles. The songs "Can't Hold Us Down" and "Something New" were previously released on their EP X4, while the songs "More Than You Know", "Renegade", "How Do You Feel Right Now" and "Dawn" were released on their EP More Than You Know.

== Track listing ==
Credits adapted from iTunes, Qobuz and Spotify.

No.	Title	Writer(s)	Producer(s)	Length
1.	"More Than You Know"	Axel Hedfors; Sebastian Ingrosso; Vincent Pontare; Salem Al Fakir; Richard Zastenker	Axwell; Sebastian Ingrosso; Richard Zastenker; Emir Kobilic	3:23
2.	"How Do You Feel Right Now"	Hedfors; Ingrosso; Issac Hayes Jr.; Sanjin Kljucanin	Axwell; Ingrosso	2:59
3.	"This Time"	Hedfors; Ingrosso; Pontare; Al Fakir; Terrence Thornton	Axwell; Ingrosso	3:37
4.	"Something New"	Hedfors; Ingrosso; Pontare; Al Fakir	Axwell; Ingrosso	4:07
5.	"Renegade"	Hedfors; Ingrosso; Al Fakir; Erich Lennig; Magnus Lidehäll; Pontare	Axwell; Ingrosso; Zastenker	3:12
6.	"Dream Bigger"	Hedfors; Ingrosso; Pharrell Williams	Axwell; Ingrosso	3:17
7.	"Sun Is Shining"	Hedfors; Ingrosso; Pontare; Al Fakir	Axwell; Ingrosso	4:15
8.	"On My Way"	Hedfors; Ingrosso; Pontare; Al Fakir	Axwell; Ingrosso	4:25
9.	"I Love You" (featuring Kid Ink)	Hedfors; Ingrosso; Madison Love; Jonathan Cunningham; Gerard Taylor; Brian Collins	Axwell; Ingrosso	3:11
10.	"Thinking About You"	Hedfors; Ingrosso; Jacob Tillberg; Richard Archer; Sebastian Furrer	Axwell; Ingrosso	3:25
11.	"Can't Hold Us Down"	Hedfors; Ingrosso; Klas Ahlund	Axwell; Ingrosso	6:18
12.	"Dawn"	Hedfors; Ingrosso	Axwell; Ingrosso	5:32
13.	"Dreamer" (featuring Trevor Guthrie) (digital bonus track)	Hedfors; Ingrosso; Pontare; Al Fakir; Elof Loelv; Guthrie	Axwell; Ingrosso	4:11

Bonus tracks
No.	Title	Writer(s)	Artist	Length
14.	"Barricade"	Hedfors; Ingrosso; Al Fakir; Pontare; Ash Pournouri; Julimar Santos; Amanda Fondell; Linnea Södahl	Axwell	4:54
15.	"Dark River"	Ingrosso; Hedfors; Lidehäll; Lennig	Sebastian Ingrosso	3:12

== Charts ==
=== Weekly charts ===
Chart (2018)	Peak position
Belgian Albums (Ultratop Flanders)	111
Danish Albums (Hitlisten)	36
Dutch Albums (Album Top 100)	90
Finnish Albums (Suomen virallinen lista)	19
Norwegian Albums (VG-lista)	16
Swedish Albums (Sverigetopplistan)	12
US Top Dance Albums (Billboard)	11

=== Year-end charts ===
Chart (2018)	Position
Estonian Albums (Eesti Ekspress)	47
Swedish Albums (Sverigetopplistan)	21

Chart (2019)	Position
Swedish Albums (Sverigetopplistan)	87

== Certifications ==
Region	Certification	Certified units/sales
Brazil (Pro-Música Brasil)	Gold	20,000^{‡}
Denmark (IFPI Danmark)	Platinum	20,000^{‡}
Italy (FIMI)	Gold	25,000^{‡}
New Zealand (RMNZ)	Gold	7,500^{‡}
Poland (ZPAV)	Platinum	20,000^{‡}
Singapore (RIAS)	Gold	5,000^{*}
^{*} Sales figures based on certification alone.^{‡} Sales+streaming figures based on certification alone.
