= WDM Radio Awards =

- Awarded for: achievements in electronic and electronic dance music
- Country: Argentina; Chile; Colombia; Costa Rica; Dominican Republic; Ecuador; Guatemala; Mexico; Nicaragua; Panama; Paraguay; Spain
- Presented by: Los 40
- First award: 2017
- Website: http://los40.com.mx/especiales/wdm-Radio-Awards/index.html

The WDM Radio Awards is an award ceremony created in 2017 by Los 40 under their World Dance Music brand, billed as "the first radio awards to electronic music". It is meant to be a global event, promoted by the twelve Los 40 stations in Spain and Latin America.

== Editions ==
Edition	Year	Date	Venue
1st	2017	March 29	Estadio Azteca, Mexico City, Mexico
2nd	2018	March 21	Estadio Azteca, Mexico City, Mexico

== 1st edition (2017) ==
The first edition was held on March 29, 2017 at Estadio Azteca in Mexico City, Mexico.

=== Awards and nominations ===
Winners indicated in bold.

Best DJ

- The Chainsmokers
- DJ Snake
- David Guetta
- **Martin Garrix**
- Diplo

Best Electro House DJ

- Axwell Λ Ingrosso
- Galantis
- Don Diablo
- **David Guetta**
- Zedd

Best Party DJ

- Steve Aoki
- **Nervo**
- Martin Garrix
- Skrillex
- Dimitri Vegas & Like Mike

King of Social Media

- Diplo
- Skrillex
- Steve Aoki
- Calvin Harris
- **Martin Garrix**

Best Global Track

- The Chainsmokers feat. Halsey - Closer
- Major Lazer feat. Justin Bieber & MØ - Cold Water
- **Calvin Harris feat. Rihanna - This Is What You Came For**
- David Guetta feat. Zara Larsson - This One's for You
- Martin Garrix & Bebe Rexha - In the Name of Love

Best Documentary EDM

- Hardwell - I Am Hardwell - Living the Dream
- **Steve Aoki - I'll Sleep When I'm Dead**
- Zedd - True Colors
- Tomorrowland - This Was Tomorrow
- Space Ibiza - 27 Years of Clubbing History

Best Trending Track

- Flume feat. Kai - Never be Like You
- **The Chainsmokers feat. Daya - Don't Let Me Down**
- Skrillex & Diplo feat. Kai - Mind
- Marshmello - Alone
- DJ Snake feat. Bipolar Sunshine - Middle

Best New Talent

- Kungs
- Kygo
- Lost Frequencies
- Marshmello
- **Alan Walker**

Best Remix

- **Seeb - I Took a Pill in Ibiza by Mike Posner**
- Don Diablo - Keeping Your Head Up by Birdy
- Tiësto - Dancing on My Own by Calum Scott
- Robin Schulz - I Was Wrong by Arizona
- Filatov & Karas - Don't Be So Shy by Imany

Best Electronic Vocalist

- **Vassy**
- Daya
- Jake Reese
- MØ
- Conrad Sewell

Best Dancefloor Track

- Deorro feat. Elvis Crespo - Bailar
- **Galantis - No Money**
- Major Lazer feat. Nyla & Fuse ODG - Light It Up
- Kungs vs Cookin' on 3 Burners - This Girl
- Tujamo - Drop That Low

=== Performers ===
- David Guetta
- Steve Aoki
- Martin Garrix
- Alan Walker
- Cedric Gervais
- Nervo
- Vassy

== 2nd edition (2018) ==
The WDM Radio Awards are slated to return to Estadio Azteca for their second edition on March 21, 2018.

=== Awards and nominations ===
Winners indicated in bold.

Best DJ

- **Martin Garrix**
- Steve Aoki
- Dimitri Vegas & Like Mike
- Hardwell
- The Chainsmokers
- Armin van Buuren

Best Electro House DJ

- Axwell Λ Ingrosso
- **Don Diablo**
- Tiësto
- DJ Snake
- Galantis
- R3hab

Best Party DJ

- **Steve Aoki**
- Afrojack
- Galantis
- The Chainsmokers
- Martin Garrix
- Nervo

King of Social Media

- Martin Garrix
- Avicii
- Calvin Harris
- Skrillex
- **Tiësto**
- David Guetta
- Major Lazer

Best Global Track

- Jonas Blue - Mama
- **Clean Bandit feat. Sean Paul and Anne-Marie - Rockabye**
- The Chainsmokers & Coldplay - Something Just like This
- Robin Schulz feat. James Blunt - OK
- Kygo & Selena Gomez - It Ain't Me
- Burak Yeter feat. Danelle Sandoval - Tuesday
- Steve Aoki & Louis Tomlinson - Just Hold On

Best Bass Track

- Dimitri Vegas & Like Mike vs David Guetta feat. Kiiara - Complicated
- Zedd & Alessia Cara - Stay
- Marshmello feat. Khalid - Silence
- David Guetta feat. Justin Bieber - 2U
- **Martin Garrix & Dua Lipa - Scared to Be Lonely**
- Alan Walker feat. Noah Cyrus & Digital Farm Animals - All Falls Down

Best Trending Track

- Dillon Francis feat. Yung Pinch - Hello There
- Tujamo feat. Sorana - One on One
- Nora En Pure - Tears In Your Eyes
- Skrillex & Poo Bear - Would You Ever
- Alesso - Take My Breath Away
- **Major Lazer feat. Travis Scott, Camila Cabello & Quavo - Know No Better**
- Sofi Tukker feat. Nervo, The Knocks & Alisa Ueno - Best Friend
- Galantis - Rich Boy
- Alan Walker - Tired
- Armin van Buuren feat. Josh Cumbee - Sunny Days
- David Guetta & Afrojack feat. Charli XCX & French Montana - Dirty Sexy Money

Best New Talent

- **Jax Jones**
- Ofenbach
- Mike Williams
- Bruno Martini
- Cheat Codes
- Yellow Claw

Best Remix

- Alan Walker - Issues by Julia Michaels
- Ryan Riback - Call on Me by Starley
- **Don Diablo - Something Just like This by The Chainsmokers & Coldplay**
- MOSKA - Mi gente by J Balvin & Willy William
- Sam Feldt - Oceans Away by Arizona
- EDX - How Long by Charlie Puth
- Steve Aoki - The Best by Mangchi

Best Dancefloor Track

- Martin Solveig - All Stars
- Axwell Λ Ingrosso - More than You Know
- Jax Jones feat. Raye - You Don't Know Me
- CamelPhat & Elderbrook - Cola
- **Hardwell & Kshmr - Power**
- David Tort, Markem & Yas Cepeda - Strangers

Best Electronic Vocalist

- Julia Michaels
- Bebe Rexha
- **Dua Lipa**
- Ina Wroldsen
- Anne-Marie

Best Deep House DJ

- Nora En Pure
- Kygo
- Lost Frequencies
- **Robin Schulz**
- EDX

=== Performers ===
- Don Diablo
- Jax Jones
- Robin Schulz
- Steve Aoki
- Tujamo
