= Salem Al Fakir =

Swedish musician, singer, songwriter (born 1981)

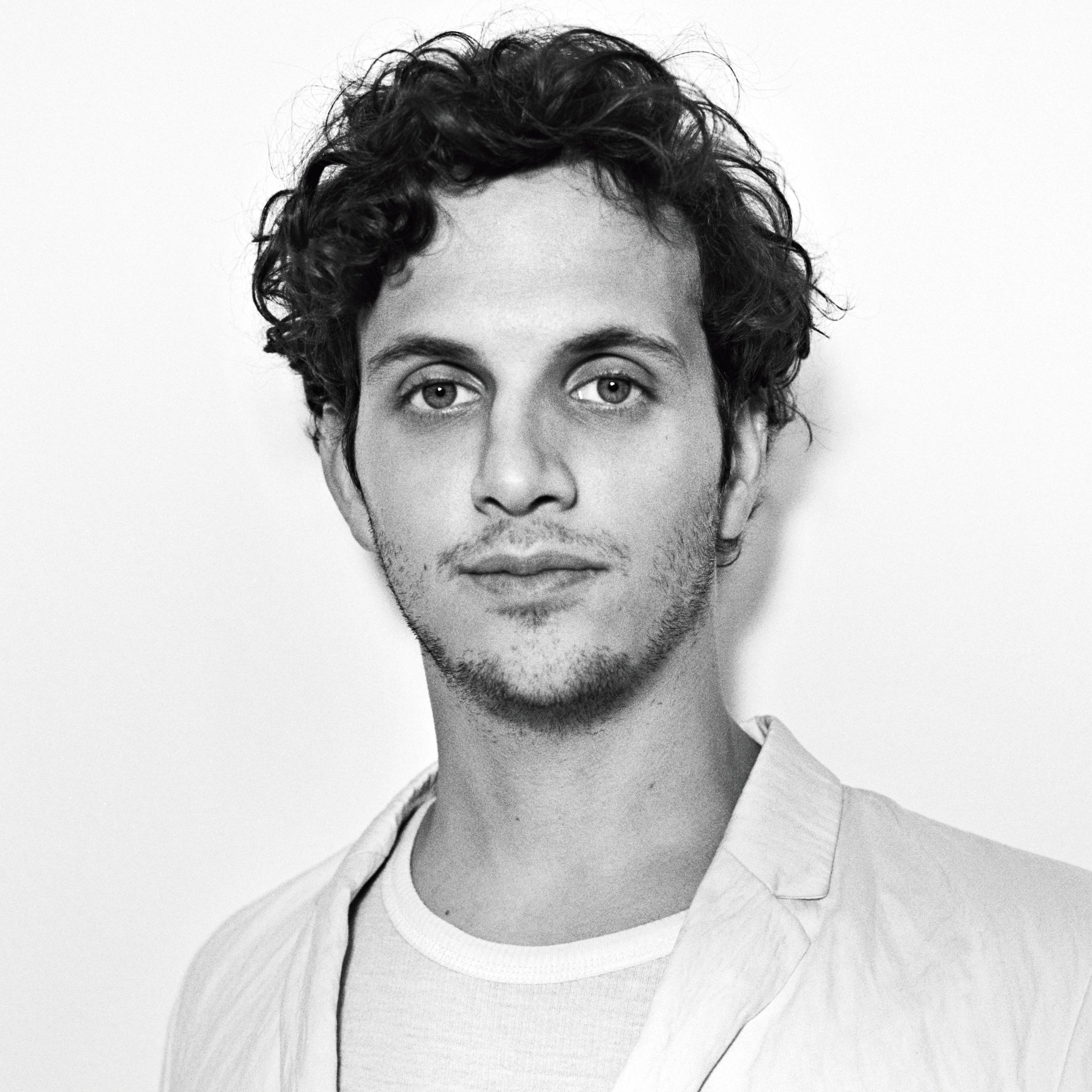
- Al Fakir in 2014

Background information
- Also known as: Lagola; Damien Adore
- Born: Lars Salem Al Fakir; 27 October 1981 (age 44); Huddinge, Sweden
- Genres: Pop; dance; EDM; soul; jazz
- Occupations: Musician; singer; songwriter; record producer
- Instruments: Vocals; piano; guitar; bass; keyboard; drums; violin
- Years active: 2006–present
- Website: vargasandlagola.com

Lars Salem Al Fakir (Arabic: لارس سليم الفقير; born 27 October 1981) is a Swedish musician, singer, songwriter and record producer. He regularly collaborates with Vincent Pontare as the songwriting and production duo Vargas and Lagola. Together, they have worked with many artists, including Avicii, Axwell & Ingrosso, Madonna, Seinabo Sey, Lady Gaga and Ghost.

== Biography ==
=== Early life and artist career ===
Salem Al Fakir's father Nabil is of Syrian origin and originated from Damascus, whereas his mother, Inger, is from Sweden. Salem is the fourth of six siblings (Aminah, Ayman, Nassim, Salem, Sami and Fares). He learned to play violin at the age of four and subsequently toured Russia as a solo violinist at the age of fourteen, but returned to Sweden to study jazz piano. As a student he attended the Adolf Fredrik's Music School in Stockholm.

In the autumn of 2006, Al Fakir released his first EP Dream Girl. He is most famous for his chart topping albums This Is Who I Am (2007), Astronaut (2009) and Ignore This (2010). At the Swedish Grammy Awards in 2008 he won big – taking home four awards and being nominated in seven categories.

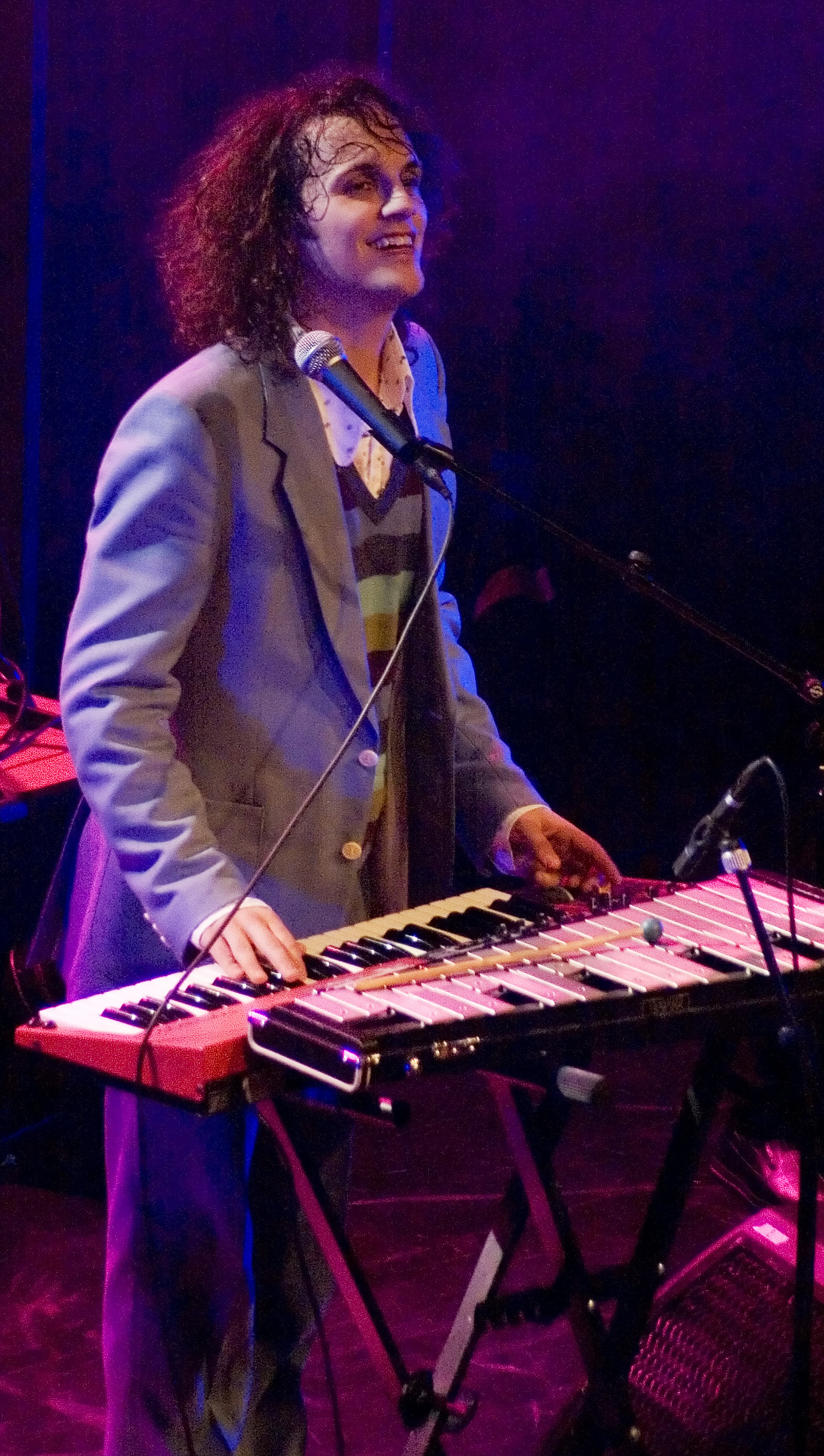
Al Fakir performing in 2007

He took part in Melodifestivalen 2010, the Swedish national selection for the Eurovision Song Contest 2010, with "Keep On Walking" and finished in second place.

=== 2010–present: Songwriting ===
After his solo career, Al Fakir became more focused on the songwriting. Beginning to collaborate with Avicii on "Silhouettes" in 2012. Among the first co-writes with Vincent Pontare are Avicii's 2013 Billboard Hot 100 single "Hey Brother" and "Younger" by Seinabo Sey.

At the 2014 Swedish Grammy Awards, Al Fakir, Vincent Pontare and Magnus Lidehäll were awarded Composer of the Year after writing for Veronica Maggio's album Handen i fickan fast jag bryr mig and the Petter album Början på allt, and work with artists like Galantis. In 2014 he wrote numerous songs on Mapei's album Hey Hey and Avicii's "The Days" and "Divine Sorrow" (with Wyclef Jean). Al Fakir followed up with another successful year in 2015 co-writing most songs on Seinabo Sey's highly acclaimed debut album Pretend and songs for Madonna's Rebel Heart album.

Vargas & Lagola have co-written some of the biggest hits by Axwell Ʌ Ingrosso – "More Than You Know", "Sun Is Shining", "Dreamer" and more - taken from their 2017 album More Than You Know.

The duo have also contributed to two songs on Swedish rock band Ghost's Billboard 200-charting and Grammy Award-nominated album Prequelle, including the album's second single "Dance Macabre" which topped Billboard's Mainstream Rock Chart.

In 2018, the same moment as Vargas & Lagola blazed onto the alternative pop scene with the hit single "Roads", they shared the no.1 spot as Sweden's most streamed songwriters for songs including Avicii – "Without You (feat. Sandro Cavazza)" and "Waiting For Love". After working closely with Avicii for several years, Al Fakir and Pontare played a key role in finishing up the 2019 posthumous Avicii album TIM and are featured artists on three of the album songs. On 5 December 2019, Vargas & Lagola performed at Avicii's Tribute Concert in Stockholm.

Vargas & Lagola's debut album The Butterfly Effect was released in January 2020.

== Discography ==
=== As solo artist ===
==== Albums ====
Year	Album	Peak positions
Year	Album	SWE
2006	Dream Girl (EP)	—
2007	This Is Who I Am	1
2009	Astronaut	7
2010	Ignore This	1

==== Singles ====
Single	Year	Peak positions	Album
Single	Year	SWE	Album
"Dream Girl"	2006	25	This Is Who I Am
"Good Song"	2006	36	This Is Who I Am
"This Is Who I Am"	2007	43	This Is Who I Am
"It's True" (with Axwell and Sebastian Ingrosso)	2007	38	This Is Who I Am
"It's Only You, Part 2"	2008	41	Astronaut
"Astronaut"	2009	34	Astronaut
"Roxy"	2009	—	Astronaut
"Keep On Walking"	2010	3	Ignore This
"4 O'Clock"	2010	49	Ignore This
"Split My Personality"	2010	—	Ignore This
"I'm So Happy" (featuring Josephine Bornebusch)	2011	—	Ignore This

==== Uncredited vocal work ====
Single	Year	Peak positions	Certification	Album
Single	Year	SWE	Certification	Album
"Silhouettes" (Avicii)	2012	11	GLF: 3× Platinum; ARIA: Gold; BPI: Silver	Non-album single
"You Make Me" (Avicii)	2013	1	GLF: 4× Platinum; ARIA: Platinum; FIMI: Gold; IFPI NOR: 2× Platinum; BPI: Gold; RIAA: Gold	True
"Something New" (Axwell Λ Ingrosso)	2014	20	GLF: 2× Platinum; FIMI: Gold	More Than You Know
"On My Way" (Axwell Λ Ingrosso)	2015	18	GLF: 2× Platinum	More Than You Know
"Sun Is Shining" (Axwell Λ Ingrosso)	2015	1	GLF: 4× Platinum; FIMI: Gold; ZPAV: Gold	More Than You Know
"Renegade" (Axwell Λ Ingrosso)	2017	—		More Than You Know

==== Songwriting and production credits ====
Year	Artist	Title	Album
2012	Avicii	"Silhouettes"	Non-album single
2013	Avicii	"You Make Me"	True
2013	Avicii	"Hey Brother"	True
2014	Galantis	"Smile"	Galantis (EP)
2014	Galantis	"Help"	Galantis (EP)
2014	Mapei	"Blame It On Me"	Hey Hey
2014	Mapei	"As 1"	Hey Hey
2014	Mapei	"Second to None"	Hey Hey
2014	Mapei	"Step Up"	Hey Hey
2014	Wyclef Jean	"Divine Sorrow" (featuring Avicii)	Non-album single
2014	Avicii	"The Days"	The Days/Nights
2015	Madonna	"HeartBreakCity"	Rebel Heart
2015	Madonna	"Wash All Over Me"	Rebel Heart
2015	Madonna	"Messiah"	Rebel Heart
2015	Madonna	"Rebel Heart"	Rebel Heart
2015	Galantis	"Kill 'Em with the Love"	Pharmacy
2015	Galantis	"Call If You Need Me"	Pharmacy
2015	Avicii	"Waiting For Love"	Stories
2015	Seinabo Sey	"Younger"	Pretend
2015	Seinabo Sey	"Poetic"	Pretend
2015	Seinabo Sey	"Hard Time"	Pretend
2015	Seinabo Sey	"Easy"	Pretend
2015	Seinabo Sey	"Words"	Pretend
2015	Seinabo Sey	"Sorry"	Pretend
2015	Seinabo Sey	"Still"	Pretend
2015	Seinabo Sey	"Ruin"	Pretend
2015	Seinabo Sey	"Burial"	Pretend
2015	Seinabo Sey	"Pistols At Dawn"	Pretend
2016	MishCatt	"Another Dimension"	Highlighter
2017	Johnossi	"On A Roll"	Blood Jungle
2017	Avicii	"Friend Of Mine" (featuring Vargas & Lagola)	Avīci (01)
2017	Avicii	"Without You" (featuring Sandro Cavazza)	Avīci (01)
2017	Toby Randall	"Hold Me Down"	ONE.
2017	Axwell Λ Ingrosso	"More Than You Know"	More Than You Know
2017	Axwell Λ Ingrosso	"Something New"	More Than You Know
2017	Axwell Λ Ingrosso	"This Time"	More Than You Know
2017	Axwell Λ Ingrosso	"Renegade"	More Than You Know
2017	Axwell Λ Ingrosso	"Sun Is Shining"	More Than You Know
2017	Axwell Λ Ingrosso	"On My Way"	More Than You Know
2017	Axwell Λ Ingrosso	"Dreamer"	More Than You Know
2017	Axwell	"Barricade"	More Than You Know
2018	Seinabo Sey	"I Love You"	I'm a Dream
2018	Seinabo Sey	"Never Get Used To"	I'm a Dream
2018	Seinabo Sey	"I Owe You Nothing"	I'm a Dream
2018	Seinabo Sey	"Breathe"	I'm a Dream
2018	Seinabo Sey	"Good In You"	I'm a Dream
2018	Ghost	"Dance Macabre"	Prequelle
2018	Ghost	"Life Eternal"	Prequelle
2018	MagnusTheMagnus	"It Don't Impress Me" (featuring Madi Banja)	Non-album single
2018	MagnusTheMagnus	"Calling" (featuring KIDDO)	Non-album single
2018	David Guetta	"Light Headed" (with Sia)	7
2018	RØMANS	"Glitter & Gold"	Non-album single
2018	Salvatore Ganacci	"Kill A Soundboy" (featuring Nailah Blackman)	Non-album single
2019	Gryffin	"You Remind Me" (featuring Stanaj)	Gravity
2019	Frank Walker & Astrid S	"Only When It Rains"	Non-album single
2019	PRETTYMUCH	"Eyes Off You"	Phases - EP
2019	Avicii	"Peace Of Mind" (featuring Vargas & Lagola)	TIM
2019	Avicii	"Tough Love" (featuring Agnes, Vargas & Lagola)	TIM
2019	Avicii	"Excuse Me Mr Sir" (featuring Vargas & Lagola)	TIM
2019	Otto Knows	"About You"	Non-album single
2019	Ghost	"Kiss The Go-Goat"	Seven Inches of Satanic Panic
2019	Ghost	"Mary On A Cross"	Seven Inches of Satanic Panic
2019	Agnes	"Intro"	Nothing Can Compare
2019	Agnes	"I Trance"	Nothing Can Compare
2019	Agnes	"Not Dangerous"	Nothing Can Compare
2019	Agnes	"Interlude (What Is Wrong)"	Nothing Can Compare
2019	Agnes	"Limelight"	Nothing Can Compare
2019	Agnes	"Interlude (I Like To Sing)"	Nothing Can Compare
2019	Agnes	"Nothing Can Compare"	Nothing Can Compare
2019	Mapei	"Ether"	Sensory Overload
2020	Galantis	"Steel"	Church
2020	Galantis	"Unless It Hurts"	Church
2020	Galantis	"Never Felt A Love Like This" (with Hook n Sling featuring Dotan)	Church
2020	Agnes	"Goodlife"	Non-album single
2020	Lady Gaga	"Sine from Above" (with Elton John)	Chromatica
2022	Ghost	"Twenties"	Impera
2025	Ghost	"Peacefield" "Satanized"	Skeletá

==== Songwriting and production credits for local Swedish artists ====
Year	Artist	Title	Album
2013	Veronica Maggio	"Sergels torg"	Handen i fickan fast jag bryr mig
2013	Veronica Maggio	"Jag lovar"	Handen i fickan fast jag bryr mig
2013	Veronica Maggio	"Hela huset" (featuring Håkan Hellström)	Handen i fickan fast jag bryr mig
2013	Veronica Maggio	"Va kvar"	Handen i fickan fast jag bryr mig
2013	Veronica Maggio	"Låtsas som det regnar"	Handen i fickan fast jag bryr mig
2013	Veronica Maggio	"Hädanefter"	Handen i fickan fast jag bryr mig
2013	Veronica Maggio	"Dallas"	Handen i fickan fast jag bryr mig
2013	Veronica Maggio	"Bas gillar hörn"	Handen i fickan fast jag bryr mig
2013	Veronica Maggio	"I min bil"	Handen i fickan fast jag bryr mig
2013	Petter	"Mighty" (featuring Newkid)	Början på allt
2013	Petter	"Början på allt" (featuring Eye N'I)	Början på allt
2013	Petter	"April"	Början på allt
2013	Petter	"Håll om mig" (featuring Daniel Adams-Ray)	Början på allt
2013	Petter	"Tills döden skiljer oss åt"	Början på allt
2013	Petter	"King" (featuring Lilla Namo)	Början på allt
2013	Petter	"Maj"	Början på allt
2013	Petter	"Arbete"	Början på allt
2013	Petter	"Alla vet" (featuring Agnes)	Början på allt
2013	Petter	"Fristad"	Början på allt
2013	Petter	"Juni"	Början på allt
2013	Petter	"Sitter på en dröm"	Början på allt
2013	Petter	"Minnen del II"	Början på allt
2013	Petter	"Släpp mig fri"	Början på allt
2016	Veronica Maggio	"Den första är alltid gratis"	Den första är alltid gratis
2016	Veronica Maggio	"Vi mot världen"	Den första är alltid gratis
2016	Veronica Maggio	"Pang pang"	Den första är alltid gratis
2018	Petter	"Kliv på!" (featuring Eye N'I)	Lev nu
2018	Petter	"Lev nu dö sen" (featuring Vargas & Lagola)	Lev nu

== Awards and nominations ==
Year	Awards	Category	Nomination	Outcome	Ref.
2007	The Swedish MPA Awards	Best Newcomer	Himself	Won	
2007	The Monica Zetterlund Scholarship	Young and Promising Artist	Himself	Won	
2007	SKAP Anniversary Award	-	Himself	Won	
2008	Expressen Kultur - Spelmannen	-	Himself	Won	
2008	Swedish Grammy Awards	Composer of the Year	Himself	Won	
2008	Swedish Grammy Awards	Male artist of the Year	Himself	Won	
2008	Swedish Grammy Awards	Producer of the Year	Himself	Won	
2008	Swedish Grammy Awards	Newcomer of the Year	Himself	Won	
2008	Swedish Grammy Awards	Song of The Year	"Good Song"	Nominated	
2008	Swedish Grammy Awards	Album of The Year	"This Is Who I Am"	Nominated	
2008	Swedish Grammy Awards	Lyricist of the Year	Himself	Nominated	
2008	P3 Guld	Best Male Artist	Himself	Nominated	
2008	P3 Guld	Best New Artist	Himself	Nominated	
2010	Swedish Grammy Awards	Composer of the Year	Himself	Nominated	
2010	Swedish Grammy Awards	Male Artist of the Year	Himself	Nominated	
2011	Swedish Grammy Awards	Song of the Year	"Keep On Walking"	Nominated	
2011	Swedish Grammy Awards	Male Artist of the Year	Himself	Nominated	
2014	Swedish Grammy Awards	Composer of the Year	Himself (with Vincent Pontare & Magnus Lidehäll)	Won	
2014	The Swedish MPA Awards	International Success of the Year	Himself (with Vincent Pontare & Magnus Lidehäll)	Nominated	
2015	Swedish Grammy Awards	Best Children's Album	Himself (with Glada Hudik-Teatern & Pontus De Wolfe)	Won	
2015	Swedish Grammy Awards	Composer of the Year	Himself (with Vincent Pontare & Magnus Lidehäll)	Nominated	
2015	The Swedish MPA Awards	International Success of the Year	Himself (with Vincent Pontare)	Nominated	
2016	Swedish Grammy Awards	Composer of the Year	Himself (with Vincent Pontare, Magnus Lidehäll & Seinabo Sey)	Nominated	
2018	Swedish Grammy Awards	Composer of the Year	Vargas & Lagola	Nominated	
