= Godspeed (Vincent album) =

Studio album by Vincent
- Released: 29 August 2011
- Recorded: 2011
- Label: Little Stereo Recordings

Vincent chronology
Lucky Thirteen (2007)	Godspeed (2011)

Singles from Godspeed
- 1. "Baby Hurricane" Released: 2010; 2. "The Moment I Met You" Released: 2011; 3. "Put Your Money Where Your Money Is" Released: 2011

Godspeed is the second studio album by Swedish singer Vincent Pontare also known as Vincent. It was released on Little Stereo Recordings label in 2011 and distributed by Warner Music Sweden AB, as a follow-up to his debut album Lucky Thirteen. It contains 9 tracks with a 1960s and 1970s feel. It is mostly co-written by Vincent and John Engelbert of the band Johnossi.

== Track list ==
No.	Title	Length
1.	"Put Your Money Where Your Money Is"	3:26
2.	"Fish In the Water"	3:57
3.	"The Moment I Met You"	3:27
4.	"Woman in My Bed"	3:38
5.	"Little Boy"	2:47
6.	"A Million Dollars and a Step Ahead"	3:35
7.	"Hotter Than July"	3:53
8.	"Baby Hurricane"	3:20
9.	"Cherry"	6:31
