= Thinking About You (Axwell & Ingrosso song) =

Single by Axwell & Ingrosso
- Released: 27 May 2016
- Length: 3:24
- Label: Def Jam Recordings
- Songwriters: Richard Archer; Sebastian Ingrosso; Axel Hedfors; Sebastian Furrer; Jacob Tillberg
- Producers: Axwell; Sebastian Ingrosso

Axwell & Ingrosso singles chronology
"Dream Bigger" (2016)	"Thinking About You" (2016)	"I Love You" (2017)

"Thinking About You" is a song by Swedish dance music duo Axwell & Ingrosso. The song was released in Sweden on 27 May 2016. The song was written by Richard Archer, Sebastian Ingrosso, Axel Hedfors, Sebastian Furrer and Jacob Tillberg. The song peaked at number 64 on the Swedish Singles Chart.

== Track listing ==
Digital download
No.	Title	Length
1.	"Thinking About You"	3:24

Digital download – Festival Mix
No.	Title	Length
1.	"Thinking About You – Festival Mix"	5:33

Digital download – Remixes
No.	Title	Length
1.	"Thinking About You – DubVision Remix"	3:26
2.	"Thinking About You – HOUNDED Remix"	2:30

== Charts ==
=== Weekly charts ===
Chart (2016)	Peak position
Hungary (Dance Top 40)	14
Hungary (Rádiós Top 40)	3
Sweden (Sverigetopplistan)	64
US Hot Dance/Electronic Songs (Billboard)	40

=== Year-end charts ===
Chart (2016)	Position
Hungary (Dance Top 40)	70
Hungary (Rádiós Top 40)	79

== Release history ==
Region	Date	Format	Label
Sweden	27 May 2016	Digital download	Def Jam Recordings
