= Lucky Thirteen (Vincent album) =

Studio album by Vincent
- Released: 7 November 2007
- Recorded: 2007
- Label: Little Stereo Recordings

Vincent chronology
Lucky Thirteen (2007)	Godspeed (2011)

Singles from Masquerade
- 1. "Paradise" Released: 2006; 2. "Don't Hate on Me" Released: 2007; 3. "Miss Blue" Released: April 25, 2008

Alternative album cover

Lucky Thirteen is the 2007 debut studio album from Swedish singer Vincent Pontare, also known as Vincent. It was released through Little Stereo Recordings. All the songs were co-written by Vincent in collaboration with other songwriters. Three singles were released from the album.

== Track listing ==
No.	Title	Writer(s)	Length
1.	"Intro"	Vincent / JallaJinx	1:23
2.	"Farewell"	Vincent / Sophia Somajo	3:16
3.	"Miss Blue"	Vincent / Sophia Somajo / Grizzly	3:22
4.	"I Was Young"	Vincent / Petter Winnberg	3:28
5.	"In My Head"	Vincent / Sophia Somajo	3:48
6.	"Don't Hate on Me"	Jukka Immonen / Patric Sarin	3:24
7.	"Paradise"	Vincent / Sophia Somajo / Rasmus Seebach	3:09
8.	"Cool Me Off"	Vincent / Per Aldeheim	3:34
9.	"How to Rob a Bank"	Vincent / Mack Carr / Douglas Carr	3:59
10.	"Enemies"	Vincent / Mathias Wollo	4:11
11.	"Tell Me (feat. Marcus Berg)"	Marcus Berg / Vincent / Sophia Somajo	3:39
12.	"Walking Crooked on a Straight Line"	Vincent / Billy Mann / MaschoPsycho	4:08
13.	"Halleluja"	Vincent / Grizzly / Tysper / Mack	7:54
14.	"Jasmine (bonus)"	Vincent / JallaJinx

== Charts ==
Chart (2007)	Peak position
Swedish Albums (Sverigetopplistan)	25
