= Handen i fickan fast jag bryr mig =

Studio album by Veronica Maggio
- Released: 4 October 2013
- Recorded: 2012–13
- Genre: Pop
- Length: 34:44
- Label: Universal Music AB
- Producer: Salem Al Fakir; Vincent Pontare; Magnus Lidehäll

Veronica Maggio chronology
Satan i gatan (2011)	Handen i fickan fast jag bryr mig (2013)	Den första är alltid gratis (2016)

Singles from Handen i fickan fast jag bryr mig
- 1. "Sergels torg" Released: 20 August 2013

Handen i fickan fast jag bryr mig (English: Hand in My Pocket Although I Care) is the fourth studio album released by Swedish singer and songwriter Veronica Maggio. The album was released in Sweden on 4 October 2013 through Universal Music AB. The album peaked at number two in Norway and number one in Sweden. The album was produced by Salem Al Fakir, Vincent Pontare and Magnus Lidehäll.

== Singles ==
- "Sergels torg" was released as the lead single from the album on 20 August 2013. The song peaked at number six on the Swedish Singles Chart.

== Track listing ==
Standard listing
No.	Title	Writer(s)	Length
1.	"Sergels torg" (Sergel's Square)	Veronica Maggio; Salem Al Fakir; Magnus Lidehäll; Vincent Pontare	3:46
2.	"Jag lovar" (I Promise)	Maggio; Al Fakir; Lidehäll; Pontare	3:29
3.	"Hela huset" (feat. Håkan Hellström) (The Whole House)	Maggio; Al Fakir; Lidehäll; Pontare	3:33
4.	"Va kvar" (Remain)	Maggio; Al Fakir; Lidehäll; Pontare	2:53
5.	"Låtsas som det regnar" (Pretend It's Raining)	Maggio; Al Fakir; Lidehäll; Pontare	3:17
6.	"Hädanefter" (Hereafter)	Maggio; Al Fakir; Lidehäll; Pontare	3:32
7.	"Trädgården en fredag" (Trädgården One Friday)	Maggio; Pontare; Christian Walz; Stefan Olsson	3:09
8.	"Dallas"	Maggio; Al Fakir; Lidehäll; Pontare	3:49
9.	"Bas gillar hörn" (Bass Likes Corners)	Maggio; Al Fakir; Lidehäll; Pontare	3:41
10.	"I min bil" (In My Car)	Maggio; Al Fakir; Lidehäll; Pontare	3:34

Spotify Bonus Track
No.	Title	Length
11.	"Mörkt" (Dark)	4:20

iTunes Bonus Track
No.	Title	Length
11.	"Riviera"	3:03

== Charts ==
=== Weekly charts ===
Chart (2013)	Peak position
Norwegian Albums (VG-lista)	2
Swedish Albums (Sverigetopplistan)	1
Finnish Albums (Suomen virallinen lista)	33

=== Year-end charts ===
Chart	Year	Position
Swedish Albums (Sverigetopplistan)	2013	5
Swedish Albums (Sverigetopplistan)	2014	4
Swedish Albums (Sverigetopplistan)	2015	22
Swedish Albums (Sverigetopplistan)	2016	40
Swedish Albums (Sverigetopplistan)	2017	50
Swedish Albums (Sverigetopplistan)	2018	53
Swedish Albums (Sverigetopplistan)	2019	34
Swedish Albums (Sverigetopplistan)	2020	43
Swedish Albums (Sverigetopplistan)	2021	40
Swedish Albums (Sverigetopplistan)	2022	26
Swedish Albums (Sverigetopplistan)	2023	5
Swedish Albums (Sverigetopplistan)	2024	7
Swedish Albums (Sverigetopplistan)	2025	7

== Release history ==
Region	Date	Format	Label
Sweden	20 August 2013	Digital download, CD	Universal Music AB

== Notes ==
1. "Trädgården" translates to "The Garden", but the song is referring specifically to the nightclub Trädgården in Stockholm.
