= Something New (Axwell & Ingrosso song) =

Single by Axwell & Ingrosso

from the EP X4
- Released: 27 November 2014
- Recorded: 2014
- Genre: Progressive house, EDM
- Length: 4:07
- Label: Def Jam
- Songwriters: Sebastian Ingrosso; Axel Hedfors; Vincent Pontare; Salem Al Fakir
- Producers: Sebastian Ingrosso; Axel Hedfors

Axwell & Ingrosso singles chronology
"Something New" (2014)	"On My Way" (2015)

Music video
- "Something New" (lyric video) on YouTube "Something New" (official video) on YouTube

"Something New" is a song by Swedish dance music duo Axwell & Ingrosso. The song was released on 27 November 2014 (9 December worldwide) via digital download as the first single from their debut EP titled X4, through Def Jam Recordings. In the US, "Something New" went to number one on the US Dance chart. The song later is included on the studio album More Than You Know.

== Background and release ==
On 26 November, the song was first premiered through a commercial for the Beats by Dre Presents: #SoloSelfie ad campaign (in which the duo themselves also make a cameo appearance). The track was then published to iTunes a day later. "Something New" marks the duo's first official release under their joint moniker Axwell Λ Ingrosso.

== Music videos ==
Two supporting videos were released for "Something New". The first one, a lyric video, was published to YouTube on 22 December 2014 through Axwell Λ Ingrosso's Vevo channel. The second video, the official video, was published on 11 February 2015. As of June 2016, the two videos have received over 30 million and 7 million views respectively.

== Track listing ==
Digital download - single
No.	Title	Length
1.	"Something New"	4:07

Digital download - Extended Club Mix
No.	Title	Length
1.	"Something New" (Extended Club Mix)	5:30

Digital download - The Remixes
No.	Title	Length
1.	"Something New" (Robin Schulz Remix Radio Edit)	3:03
2.	"Something New" (Robin Schulz Remix)	5:17
3.	"Something New" (Amtrac Remix)	4:58

== Credits and personnel ==
- Songwriters – Sebastian Ingrosso, Axel Hedfors, Vincent Pontare, Salem Al Fakir
- Vocalist – Salem Al Fakir
- Producers – Sebastian Ingrosso, Axel Hedfors
- Label: Def Jam Recordings

== Chart performance ==
=== Weekly charts ===
Chart (2014–2015)	Peak position
Belgium Dance (Ultratop Flanders)	12
Belgium (Ultratip Bubbling Under Flanders)	13
Belgium Dance Bubbling Under (Ultratop Wallonia)	1
Belgium Airplay (Ultratop Wallonia)	31
Belgium Dance (Ultratop Wallonia)	11
Belgium (Ultratip Bubbling Under Wallonia)	3
Belgium Dance Bubbling Under (Ultratop Wallonia)	17
France (SNEP)	56
Germany (Airplay Chart)	90
Hungary (Dance Top 40)	9
Hungary (Single Top 40)	22
Ireland (IRMA)	74
Japan Hot 100 (Billboard)	57
Japan (ZIP Dance Hits 20)	1
Poland (Dance Top 50)	18
Spain (Promusicae)	43
Sweden (Sverigetopplistan)	20
UK Dance (OCC)	6
UK Singles (OCC)	22
US Dance Club Songs (Billboard)	1
US Hot Dance/Electronic Songs (Billboard)	14

=== Year-end charts ===
Chart (2015)	Position
Hungary (Dance Top 40)	28
US Dance Club Songs (Billboard)	1
US Hot Dance/Electronic Songs (Billboard)	47

== Certifications ==
Region	Certification	Certified units/sales
Brazil (Pro-Música Brasil)	Gold	30,000^{‡}
Italy (FIMI)	Gold	25,000^{‡}
Sweden (GLF)	2× Platinum	80,000^{‡}
^{‡} Sales+streaming figures based on certification alone.

== Release history ==
Country	Date	Format	Label
Sweden	9 December 2014	Digital download	Axwell Music ABRefune Music Ltd.
France	9 December 2014	Digital download	Axwell Music ABRefune Music Ltd.
Belgium	9 December 2014	Digital download	Axwell Music ABRefune Music Ltd.
United States	27 January 2015	Digital download	Axwell Music ABRefune Music Ltd.
United Kingdom	24 February 2015	Digital download	Axwell Music ABRefune Music Ltd.

== See also ==
- List of Billboard Dance Club Songs number ones of 2015
