= Sergels torg (song) =

Single by Veronica Maggio

from the album Handen i fickan fast jag bryr mig
- Released: 20 August 2013
- Recorded: 2012/13
- Genre: Pop
- Length: 3:48
- Label: Universal Music
- Songwriter(s): Salem Al Fakir, Magnus Lidehäll, Veronica Maggio, Vincent Pontare

Veronica Maggio singles chronology
"Mitt hjärta blöder" (2012)	"Sergels torg" (2013)	"Hela huset" (2014)

"Sergels torg" (Swedish for "Sergel's Square") is a single by Swedish singer Veronica Maggio. It was released in Sweden as a digital download on 20 August 2013 as the lead single from her fourth studio album Handen i fickan fast jag bryr mig (2013). The song peaked at number 6 on the Swedish Singles Chart.

== Music video ==
A lyric video to accompany the release of "Sergels torg" was first released onto YouTube on 21 August 2013 at a total length of three minutes and forty-nine seconds. An official music video was released on 25 September 2013. The video does not show the Sergels torg square in Stockholm of the song’s title but the singer alone at an abandoned resort.

== Track listing ==
Digital download
No.	Title	Length
1.	"Sergels torg"	3:48
2.	"Sergels torg" (Instrumental)	3:47

== Charts ==
=== Weekly charts ===
Chart (2013)	Peak position
Sweden (Sverigetopplistan)	6

=== Year-end charts ===
2011 year-end position for "Sergels torg"
Chart (2013)	Position
Sweden (Sverigetopplistan)	56

== Release history ==
Region	Date	Format	Label
Sweden	20 August 2013	Digital Download	Universal Music
