= On My Way (Axwell & Ingrosso song) =

Single by Axwell & Ingrosso
- Released: 12 March 2015
- Recorded: 2014
- Genre: Progressive house
- Length: 4:28
- Label: Def Jam Recordings
- Songwriters: Sebastian Ingrosso; Salem Al Fakir; Axel Hedfors; Vincent Pontare
- Producers: Sebastian Ingrosso; Axel Hedfors

Axwell & Ingrosso singles chronology
"Something New" (2014)	"On My Way" (2015)	"Can't Hold Us Down" (2015)

"On My Way" is a song by Swedish dance music duo Axwell & Ingrosso. The song was released in Sweden on 12 March 2015. The song was written by Sebastian Ingrosso, Salem Al Fakir, Axel Hedfors, Vincent Pontare. The song peaked at number 18 on the Swedish Singles Chart.

== Usage in media ==
The song appeared in the opening sequence for ESPN's coverage of the 2015 World Series of Poker.

== Music video ==
A music video to accompany the release of "On My Way" was first released onto YouTube on 12 March 2015 at a total length of six minutes and fifty-one seconds. As of June 2016, it has received over 8 million views.

== Track listing ==
Digital download
No.	Title	Length
1.	"On My Way"	4:28

Digital download – Mercer Remix
No.	Title	Length
1.	"On My Way" (Mercer Remix)	5:19

== Charts ==
=== Weekly charts ===
Chart (2015)	Peak position
Belgium (Ultratip Flanders)	78
Belgium (Ultratip Wallonia)	10
Netherlands (Single Top 100)	82
Sweden (Sverigetopplistan)	18
UK Singles (OCC)	100
UK Dance (OCC)	30
US Hot Dance/Electronic Songs (Billboard)	26
US Dance Club Songs (Billboard)	4

=== Year-end charts ===
Chart (2015)	Position
Sweden (Sverigetopplistan)	75
US Hot Dance/Electronic Songs (Billboard)	73

== Certifications ==
Region	Certification	Certified units/sales
Sweden (GLF)	2× Platinum	80,000^{‡}
^{‡} Sales+streaming figures based on certification alone.

== Release history ==
Region	Date	Format	Label
Sweden	12 March 2015	Digital download	Def Jam Recordings
