= Musikförläggarnas pris =

- Awarded for: Music achievements
- Country: Sweden
- First award: 2003; 23 years ago
- Website: musikforlaggarna.se/musikforlaggarnas-pris

Musikförläggarnas pris is an annual award given to Swedish songwriters, producers and lyricists. The award was created in 2003 by the Musikförläggarna music organisation in Sweden and meants to highlight Swedish music and its creators. The award ceremony is held every year at Berns Salonger in Stockholm and the prizes are made by designer Bertil Vallien.

== Categories ==
- Composer of the Year
- International Success of the Year
- Breakthrough of the Year
- Song of the Year
- Art Music Award of the Year - Large Ensemble/Opera
- Art Music Award of the Year - Small Ensemble/Chamber Music
- Scholarship Award
- Special Award of the Year
- Most Played Song of the Year
