= Sun Is Shining (Axwell & Ingrosso song) =

2015 Axwell & Ingrosso song

Single by Axwell & Ingrosso
- Released: 12 June 2015
- Recorded: 2014
- Genre: Progressive house
- Length: 4:14
- Label: Def Jam
- Songwriters: Sebastian Ingrosso; Salem Al Fakir; Axel Hedfors; Vincent Pontare
- Producers: Sebastian Ingrosso; Axel Hedfors

Axwell & Ingrosso singles chronology
"Can't Hold Us Down" (2015)	"Sun Is Shining" (2015)	"This Time" (2015)

Music video
- "Sun Is Shining" on YouTube (Note: The music video has been removed from YouTube. However, it is still available at the Wayback Machine.)

"Sun Is Shining" is a song by Swedish dance music duo Axwell & Ingrosso. The song was released in Sweden on 12 June 2015. The song was written by Sebastian Ingrosso, Salem Al Fakir, Axel Hedfors and Vincent Pontare. The song peaked at number 1 on the Swedish Singles Chart. The song features uncredited vocals from Al Fakir.

== Music video ==
A music video to accompany the release of "Sun Is Shining" was first released onto YouTube on 12 June 2015 at a total length of four minutes and ten seconds. The video was shot in Antwerp, Belgium. It shows people finding notes with the song's lyrics written on them, which are revealed to have been created by Axwell and Ingrosso themselves, who also spread the notes across the city by throwing them off roofs of buildings. At the end of the video a vortex sweeps all the notes into the shape of the duo's logo. As of February 2021, it has received more than 138 million views.

== Track listing ==
Digital download
No.	Title	Length
1.	"Sun Is Shining"	4:14

Digital download - Remixes
No.	Title	Length
1.	"Sun Is Shining" (Marcus Schossow & Years Remix)	6:01
2.	"Sun Is Shining" (R3hab Remix)	3:41
3.	"Sun Is Shining" (M-22 Remix)	6:03
4.	"Sun Is Shining" (W&W Remix)	5:14

== Commercial usage ==
The song was used in a 2015 summer swimwear commercial for Swedish clothing company H&M which featured models Adriana Lima, Doutzen Kroes, Natasha Poly, and Joan Smalls.

== Charts ==
=== Weekly charts ===
Chart (2015)	Peak position
Austria (Ö3 Austria Top 40)	13
Belgium (Ultratop Flanders)	8
Belgium Dance (Ultratop Flanders)	8
Belgium (Ultratop Wallonia)	18
Belgium Dance (Ultratop Wallonia)	7
Denmark (Tracklisten)	20
Finland (Suomen virallinen lista)	7
France (SNEP)	31
Germany (Official German Charts)	51
Hungary (Dance Top 40)	9
Hungary (Rádiós Top 40)	23
Hungary (Single Top 40)	6
Hungary (Stream Top 40)	18
Italy (FIMI)	56
Netherlands (Single Top 100)	8
Netherlands (Official Dutch40 Charts)	6
Norway (VG-lista)	4
Poland Airplay (ZPAV)	11
Poland (Polish Airplay New)	5
Spain (PROMUSICAE)	48
Sweden (Sverigetopplistan)	1
Switzerland (Schweizer Hitparade)	41
UK Singles (Official Charts)	56
UK Dance (Official Charts)	13
US Hot Dance/Electronic Songs (Billboard)	19
US Dance Club Songs (Billboard)	5
US Dance Airplay (Billboard)	16

=== Year-end charts ===
Chart (2015)	Position
Belgium (Ultratop Flanders)	49
France (SNEP)	197
Hungary (Dance Top 40)	45
Hungary (Single Top 40)	68
Netherlands (Dutch Top 40)	31
Netherlands (Single Top 100)	44
Sweden (Sverigetopplistan)	24
US Hot Dance/Electronic Songs (Billboard)	54

Chart (2016)	Position
Hungary (Dance Top 40)	37
Hungary (Rádiós Top 40)	91

== Certifications ==
Region	Certification	Certified units/sales
Brazil (Pro-Música Brasil)	Gold	30,000^{‡}
Denmark (IFPI Danmark)	Platinum	90,000^{‡}
Italy (FIMI)	Platinum	50,000^{‡}
Netherlands (NVPI)	Platinum	30,000^{‡}
Norway (IFPI Norway)	2× Platinum	80,000^{‡}
Poland (ZPAV)	Gold	10,000^{‡}
Spain (Promusicae)	Platinum	60,000^{‡}
Sweden (GLF)	5× Platinum	200,000^{‡}
United Kingdom (BPI)	Silver	200,000^{‡}
^{‡} Sales+streaming figures based on certification alone.

== Release history ==
Region	Date	Format	Label
Sweden	12 June 2015	Digital download	Def Jam Recordings
