= More Than You Know (Axwell & Ingrosso song) =

Single by Axwell & Ingrosso

from the album More Than You Know
- Released: 27 May 2017
- Recorded: 2016
- Genre: Dance-pop; EDM
- Length: 3:23
- Label: Def Jam; Virgin EMI
- Songwriters: Sebastian Ingrosso; Salem Al Fakir; Axel Hedfors; Vincent Pontare; Richard Zastenker; Kristoffer Fogelmark (Bonn)

Axwell & Ingrosso singles chronology
"Renegade" (2017)	"More Than You Know" (2017)	"Dreamer" (2017)

Music video
- "More Than You Know" on YouTube

"More Than You Know" is a song by Swedish dance music duo Axwell & Ingrosso featuring uncredited vocals from Kristoffer Fogelmark. The song was released in Sweden as a digital download on 27 May 2017 as the second single from their debut studio album of the same name. The song was written by Sebastian Ingrosso, Salem Al Fakir, Axel Hedfors, Vincent Pontare and Richard Zastenker. The song peaked at number two on the Swedish Singles Chart.

The music video for the track features model Romi Van Renterghem.

A Latin remix of the song, featuring Colombian singer Sebastián Yatra and Colombian duo Cali y El Dandee, was released worldwide in October 2017.

== Music video ==
The video is shot through a VHS Camcorder, and both depict and reminisce a day in the events of the filmer. The filmer and his girlfriend (Romi van Renterghem) are shown dressing and attending a concert by Axwell Λ Ingrosso themselves before buying alcohol and attending another party. At the second party, they indulge in food and drink until a fight emerges. The filmer is shown approaching his girlfriend, who is sitting on a pier, supposedly reflecting on the events of the last day before the camcorder's battery runs out, ending the video.

== Charts ==
=== Weekly charts ===
Weekly chart performance
Chart (2017–2018)	Peak position
Australia (ARIA)	41
Australia Dance (ARIA)	6
Austria (Ö3 Austria Top 40)	1
Belarus Airplay (Eurofest)	1
Belgium (Ultratop 50 Flanders)	4
Belgium Dance (Ultratop 50 Flanders)	3
Belgium (Ultratop 50 Wallonia)	2
Belgium Dance (Ultratop 50 Wallonia)	1
Bolivia Airplay (Monitor Latino) Spanish version	17
Canada Hot 100 (Billboard)	52
CIS Airplay (TopHit)	4
Croatia International Airplay (Top lista)	6
Czech Republic Airplay (ČNS IFPI)	1
Czech Republic Singles Digital (ČNS IFPI)	1
Denmark (Tracklisten)	26
Finland (Suomen virallinen lista)	4
Finland Airplay (Radiosoittolista)	1
France (SNEP)	46
Germany (GfK)	1
Germany Dance (Official German Charts)	1
Hungary (Dance Top 40)	1
Hungary (Rádiós Top 40)	1
Hungary (Single Top 40)	3
Hungary (Stream Top 40)	1
Ireland (IRMA)	10
Israel International Airplay (Media Forest)	9
Italy (FIMI)	4
Latvia Streaming (DigiTop100)	29
Mexico Airplay (Billboard)	50
Netherlands (Dutch Top 40)	3
Netherlands (Single Top 100)	14
New Zealand (Recorded Music NZ)	22
Norway (VG-lista)	4
Poland Airplay (ZPAV)	1
Poland Dance (ZPAV)	3
Portugal (AFP)	24
Romania (Airplay 100)	1
Romania Airplay (Media Forest)	1
Russia Airplay (TopHit)	4
Scotland Singles (Official Charts)	45
Slovakia Airplay (ČNS IFPI)	2
Slovakia Singles Digital (ČNS IFPI)	1
Slovenia (SloTop50)	2
Spain (PROMUSICAE)	38
Sweden (Sverigetopplistan)	2
Switzerland (Schweizer Hitparade)	2
Ukraine Airplay (TopHit)	4
UK Singles (Official Charts)	30
UK Dance (Official Charts)	8
US Dance Club Songs (Billboard)	3
US Hot Dance/Electronic Songs (Billboard)	13

2019–2026 weekly chart performance
Chart (2019–2026)	Peak position
Belarus Airplay (TopHit)	105
Estonia Airplay (TopHit)	48
Romania Airplay (TopHit)	88

=== Year-end charts ===
Annual chart rankings
Chart (2017)	Position
Austria (Ö3 Austria Top 40)	6
Belgium (Ultratop Flanders)	25
Belgium (Ultratop Wallonia)	47
Denmark (Tracklisten)	95
France (SNEP)	132
Germany (Official German Charts)	6
Hungary (Dance Top 40)	25
Hungary (Rádiós Top 40)	15
Hungary (Single Top 40)	29
Hungary (Stream Top 40)	5
Italy (FIMI)	28
Latvia Airplay (LaIPA)	4
Netherlands (Dutch Top 40)	6
Netherlands (Single Top 100)	35
Poland (ZPAV)	33
Romania (Airplay 100)	17
Slovenia (SloTop50)	31
Spain (PROMUSICAE)	100
Sweden (Sverigetopplistan)	6
Switzerland (Schweizer Hitparade)	24
US Hot Dance/Electronic Songs (Billboard)	30

Chart (2018)	Position
Estonia (Eesti Ekspress)	45
Germany (Official German Charts)	82
Hungary (Dance Top 40)	3
Hungary (Rádiós Top 40)	25
Slovenia (SloTop50)	24
Sweden (Sverigetopplistan)	64
Switzerland (Schweizer Hitparade)	78

Chart (2019)	Position
Hungary (Dance Top 40)	15
Hungary (Rádiós Top 40)	91

Chart (2020)	Position
Hungary (Dance Top 40)	84

Chart (2024)	Position
Estonia Airplay (TopHit)	156

=== Decade-end charts ===
Decennium chart rankings
Chart (2010–2019)	Position
Germany (Official German Charts)	31

== Certifications ==
Certifications and sales
Region	Certification	Certified units/sales
Australia (ARIA)	Gold	35,000^{‡}
Austria (IFPI Austria)	Platinum	30,000^{‡}
Belgium (BRMA)	2× Platinum	40,000^{‡}
Brazil (Pro-Música Brasil)	Diamond	160,000^{‡}
Canada (Music Canada)	Platinum	80,000^{‡}
Denmark (IFPI Danmark)	2× Platinum	180,000^{‡}
France (SNEP)	Platinum	133,333^{‡}
Germany (BVMI)	3× Platinum	1,200,000^{‡}
Italy (FIMI)	4× Platinum	200,000^{‡}
New Zealand (RMNZ)	3× Platinum	90,000^{‡}
Norway (IFPI Norway)	3× Platinum	120,000^{‡}
Poland (ZPAV)	Diamond	250,000^{‡}
Portugal (AFP)	2× Platinum	20,000^{‡}
Spain (Promusicae)	2× Platinum	120,000^{‡}
United Kingdom (BPI)	Platinum	600,000^{‡}
United States (RIAA)	Gold	500,000^{‡}
Streaming
Sweden (GLF)	10× Platinum	80,000,000^{†}
^{‡} Sales+streaming figures based on certification alone.^{†} Streaming-only figures based on certification alone.

== Release history ==
Region	Date	Format	Label
Sweden	27 May 2017	Digital download	Def Jam
United States	12 September 2017	Contemporary hit radio	Def Jam

== See also ==
- List of Airplay 100 number ones of the 2010s
