= Sebastian Ingrosso =

Swedish DJ and music producer (born 1983)

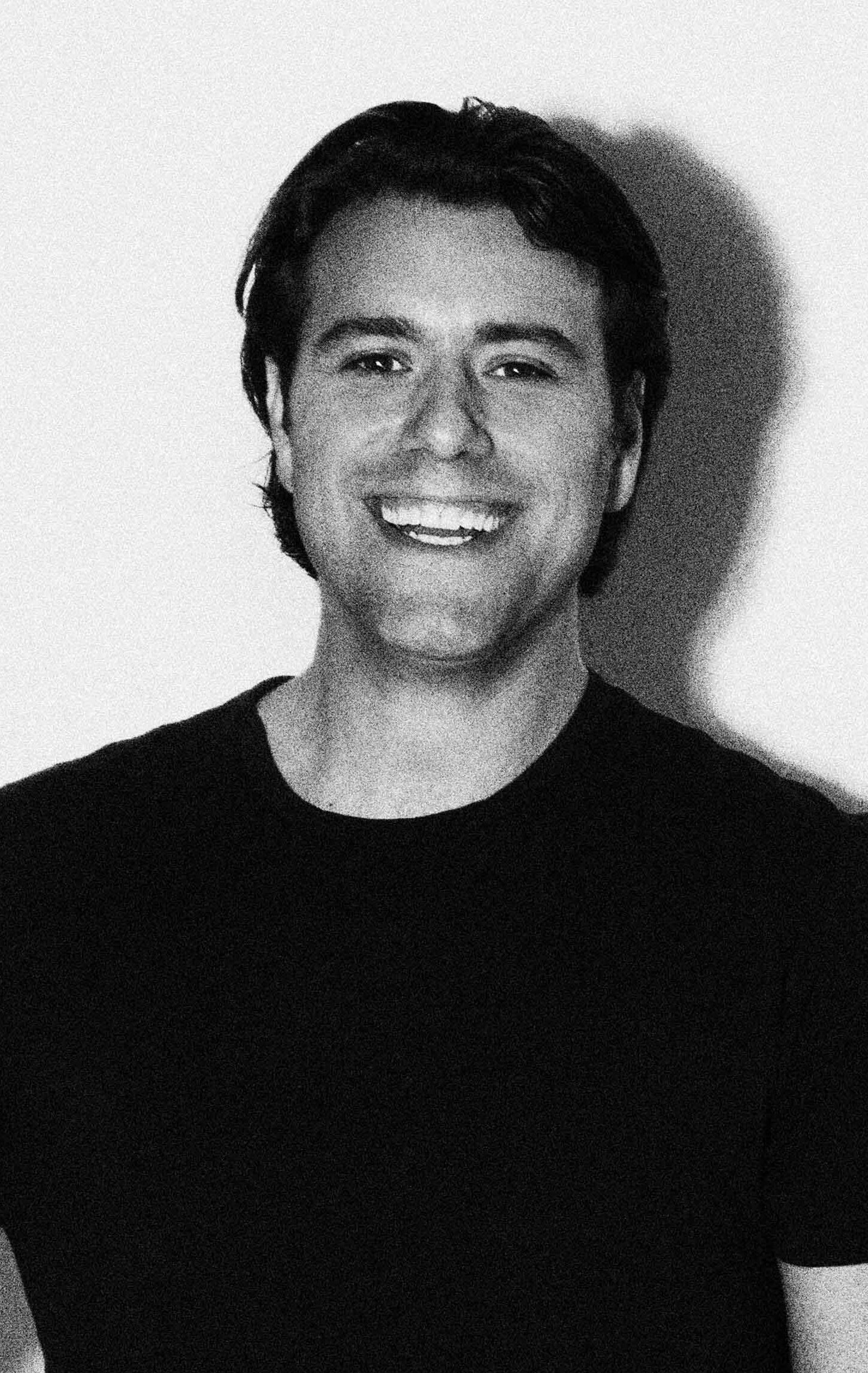
- Sebastian Ingrosso in 2012

Background information
- Also known as: Ingrosso
- Born: Sebastian Carmine Ingrosso; 20 April 1983 (age 43); Stockholm, Sweden
- Genres: Progressive house; electro house
- Occupations: DJ; record producer
- Years active: 1999–present
- Labels: Refune; Ministry of Sound; Def Jam
- Member of: Swedish House Mafia; Axwell Λ Ingrosso; Buy Now
- Website: sebastianingrosso.com

Sebastian Carmine Ingrosso (born 20 April 1983) is a Swedish DJ and record producer. He is a member of Swedish House Mafia, together with Axwell and Steve Angello.

== Career ==
=== 1999–2007: Career beginnings ===
Sebastian Ingrosso entered the music industry in 1999 releasing his first remix through Mega Records. Since then, he continued to release many remixes and singles. In 2003 Sebastian Ingrosso founded his own record label – Refune Music. In later years, Ingrosso found himself collaborating heavily with fellow Swedish DJs Axwell, Steve Angello, Eric Prydz and Alesso.

=== 2008–2013: Swedish House Mafia and solo breakthrough ===
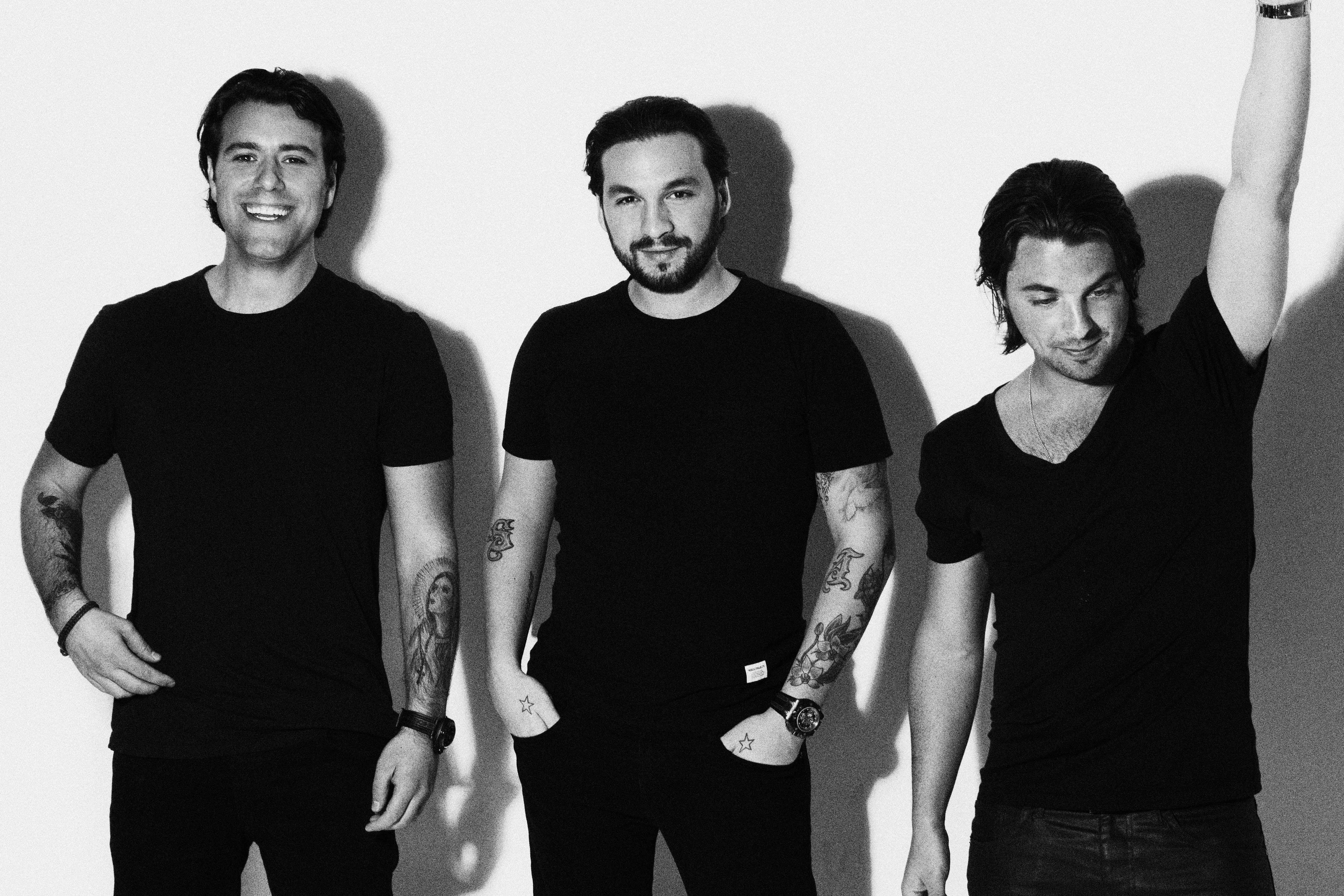
Ingrosso (left) with Swedish House Mafia during their Until Now photoshoot in 2012

==== 2008–2010: Until One, Collaborations, and DJ Mag entry ====
In late 2008, Sebastian Ingrosso, Steve Angello, and Axwell formed the Swedish House Mafia with Eric Prydz not joining, saying he is a control freak and cannot abide with collaborations even with close friends. Around this time Swedish House Mafia released two songs, "Get Dumb" and "Leave the World Behind", however these weren't credited under the group name. Ingrosso himself collaborated with David Guetta on the songs "Everytime We Touch" and "How Soon is Now" for Guetta's albums Pop Life and One Love respectively. In 2009 Ingrosso made his debut on the DJ Mag top 100 DJs, charting at number 25, the highest new entry that year. In 2010, he released his debut album with Swedish House Mafia named Until One. This followed the release of two success single "One (Your Name)" (featuring Pharrell Williams) and "Miami 2 Ibiza" (featuring Tinie Tempah). The album also contained solo work by Sebastian Ingrosso such as the songs "Kidos" and "Meich", plus his remix of "Silvia" by Miike Snow. In addition, Ingrosso made his Tomorrowland debut with Swedish House Mafia and achieved his peaked positions on the DJ Mag poll at number 10 while Swedish House Mafia debuted at number 23.

==== 2011–2012: Until Now, and Breakthrough solo singles ====
In May 2011, Sebastian Ingrosso began work on his second album with Swedish House Mafia with the release of the single Save the World featuring vocals from Swedish singer John Martin. In the summer Swedish House Mafia again performed at Tomorrowland and released two more songs in the winter named "Antidote" and "Greyhound". In early 2012 Ingrosso released one of his most notable solo tracks with Swedish DJ Alesso (who at the time had recently signed to Ingrosso's record label) and OneRepublic front man Ryan Tedder. The song named "Calling (Lose My Mind)" became a commercial success certifying 2× Platinum in Sweden. In July, Swedish House Mafia performed at Tomorrowland for the third consecutive year, this time heading the event and opening Night 2. In September following a successful summer of live performances, Swedish House Mafia released their most commercially successful track "Don't You Worry Child", again featuring the vocal of John Martin which reach number 1 in Sweden, Australia, and the UK and was a multiplatinum song in many countries. The same month Sebastian Ingrosso released his collaboration with Tommy Trash entitled "Reload", this along with "Calling (Lose My Mind)" would feature on Swedish House Mafia's second studio/compilation album Until Now.

==== 2013: One Last Tour, and continued solo work ====
In November 2012, Swedish House Mafia kicked off their One Last Tour after its announcement in June of that year. The supergroup stated that the final leg of this tour would be their last and the group would split up after its conclusion at Ultra Music Festival Miami 2013. At one of their last performances of the tour, at Madison Square Garden Ingrosso famously broke the sound barrier as he was drumming so quickly with his drumpad. Following the break up Ingrosso returned to his solo music and the song "Reload", adding in the vocals of favourite collaborator John Martin and renaming the song to "Reload (Take My Hand)". This allowed the song to become a commercial success certifying in Sweden and the UK and becoming a chart hit in many countries. In July, Sebastian Ingrosso made his Tomorrowland debut as a solo artist, performing the main stage on Night 1. Despite the break up of the Swedish House Mafia, Ingrosso collaborated with Axwell on "Roar" for the Monsters University Soundtrack in early 2013. In October, Ingrosso made a new peak on the DJ Mag top 100 DJs achieving number 18.

=== 2014–2017: Axwell Λ Ingrosso ===
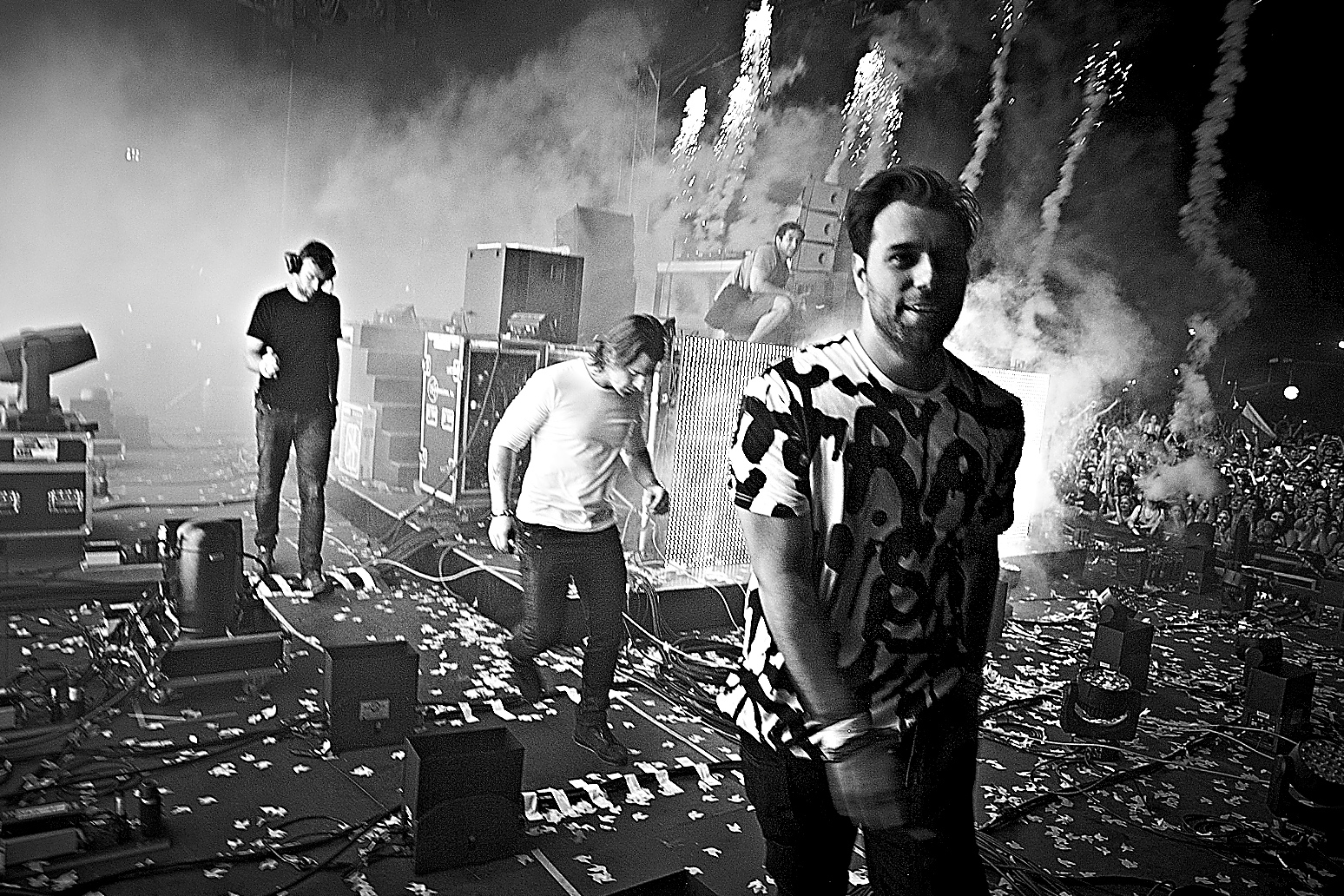
Ingrosso (right) on stage with Axwell (centre) in 2014

==== 2014: X4 and Governors Ball ====
Sebastian Ingrosso joined forces with Axwell, debuting their new collective at the 2014 Governors Ball Music Festival in New York City – their new group named Axwell Λ Ingrosso, this followed the release of their debut EP X4. One of the songs from this EP, "We Come, We Rave, We Love", was the final version of a song started by Swedish House Mafia and was played frequently during their One Last Tour. A single, "Something New" was released from the EP in November of that year.

==== 2015–2017: Single releases and solo work ====
In the early months of 2015 Ingrosso released his second and third single under the Axwell Λ Ingrosso collaboration entitled "On My Way" and "Can't Hold Us Down" respectively. In June, the duo released their fourth single named "Sun Is Shining". This song became number 1 in Sweden and was Ingrosso's (and Axwell's) first number 1 since "Don't You Worry Child". In July the duo headlined Tomorrowland closing Night Two.

In November 2015 "This Time" was released under Axwell Λ Ingrosso and "Dream Bigger" on New Year's Eve. 2016 saw Sebastian Ingrosso's first releases as an individual since "Roar", releasing two songs, "FLAGS!" and "Dark River". The latter of the two would feature on Axwell Λ Ingrosso's debut album More Than You Know. Under Axwell Λ Ingrosso, new music saw vocals from Pharrell Williams added to "Dream Bigger" and the release of "Thinking About You". In February 2017 the duo released "I Love You" featuring Kid Ink.

==== 2017: More Than You Know ====
In early May 2017, Ingrosso released the first single from his second EP with Axwell under their collective entitled "Renegade" with the EP and its title song, "More Than You Know" being released in the latter parts of that month. The song was a commercial success, becoming a chart hit gaining certifications in many countries. In July, Sebastian Ingrosso perform at Tomorrowland both as a solo artist (on the Refune stage) and under Axwell Λ Ingrosso (on the main stage) who was a headliner for the event. On 8 December 2017, the duo's debut album, More Than You Know, was released. The album contained all of their previously released music and their new single "Dreamer".

=== 2018–present: Swedish House Mafia reunion and Axwell Λ Ingrosso hiatus ===
On the final weekend of March 2018, Sebastian Ingrosso performed at Ultra Miami 2018 as Axwell Λ Ingrosso. The same festival also saw Ingrosso perform as Swedish House Mafia as the band reunited after a five-year hiatus on the festival's 20th anniversary. On 29 June, Axwell Λ Ingrosso released their first single since their debut studio album, More Than You Know, featuring British singer RØMANS called "Dancing Alone". A month later the duo performed at Tomorrowland 2018, in which they paid tribute to the late DJ Avicii as part of their set. In August 2018, Axwell Λ Ingrosso announced that they would be going on hiatus in order to focus on the Swedish House Mafia reunion and 2019 tour.

On 25 July 2025, Ingrosso released the single "A New Day", with Celine Dion, remixing the latter's 2002 single "A New Day Has Come".

== Personal life ==
Born and raised in Stockholm, Ingrosso is of Italian and Swedish descent. He spent his teenage years in his choreographer father Vito Ingrosso's studio learning how to make music. He is a cousin of singer Benjamin Ingrosso and social influencer Bianca Ingrosso. His father's brother Nicola Ingrosso is the ex-husband of Swedish singer and television host Charlotte Perrelli.

In addition, Ingrosso is a childhood friend of fellow Swedish House Mafia member Steve Angello, meeting at age six.

In 2011, Ingrosso married the singer and songwriter Kinnda. They have two daughters.

== Awards and nominations ==
=== DJ Awards ===
Year	Category	Outcome	Ref.
2008	Best House DJ	Nominated	
2009	Best House DJ	Nominated	
2010	Best House DJ	Won	
2011	Best House DJ	Nominated	
2012	Best Electro House DJ	Nominated	
2013	Best Electro House DJ	Nominated	

=== DJ Magazine top 100 DJs ===
Year	Position	Notes	Ref.
2009	25	New Entry	
2010	16	—N/a	
2011	26	—N/a	
2012	34	—N/a	
2013	18	—N/a	
2014	39	—N/a	

=== Grammy Awards ===
Year	Category	Work	Outcome	Ref.
2013	Best Composers	—N/a	Nominated	
2014	Best Song	"Reload"	Nominated	

=== International Dance Music Awards ===
Year	Category	Work	Outcome	Ref.
2012	Best Progressive Track	"Calling (Lose My Mind)"	Nominated	
2014	Best Electro / Progressive House Track	"Reload"	Nominated	

=== YouTube Creator Awards ===
- Sebastian Ingrosso
  (181 thousand subscribers – May 2020)

== See also ==
- Swedish popular music
