= Axwell & Ingrosso =

Swedish DJ duo

Axwell Λ Ingrosso
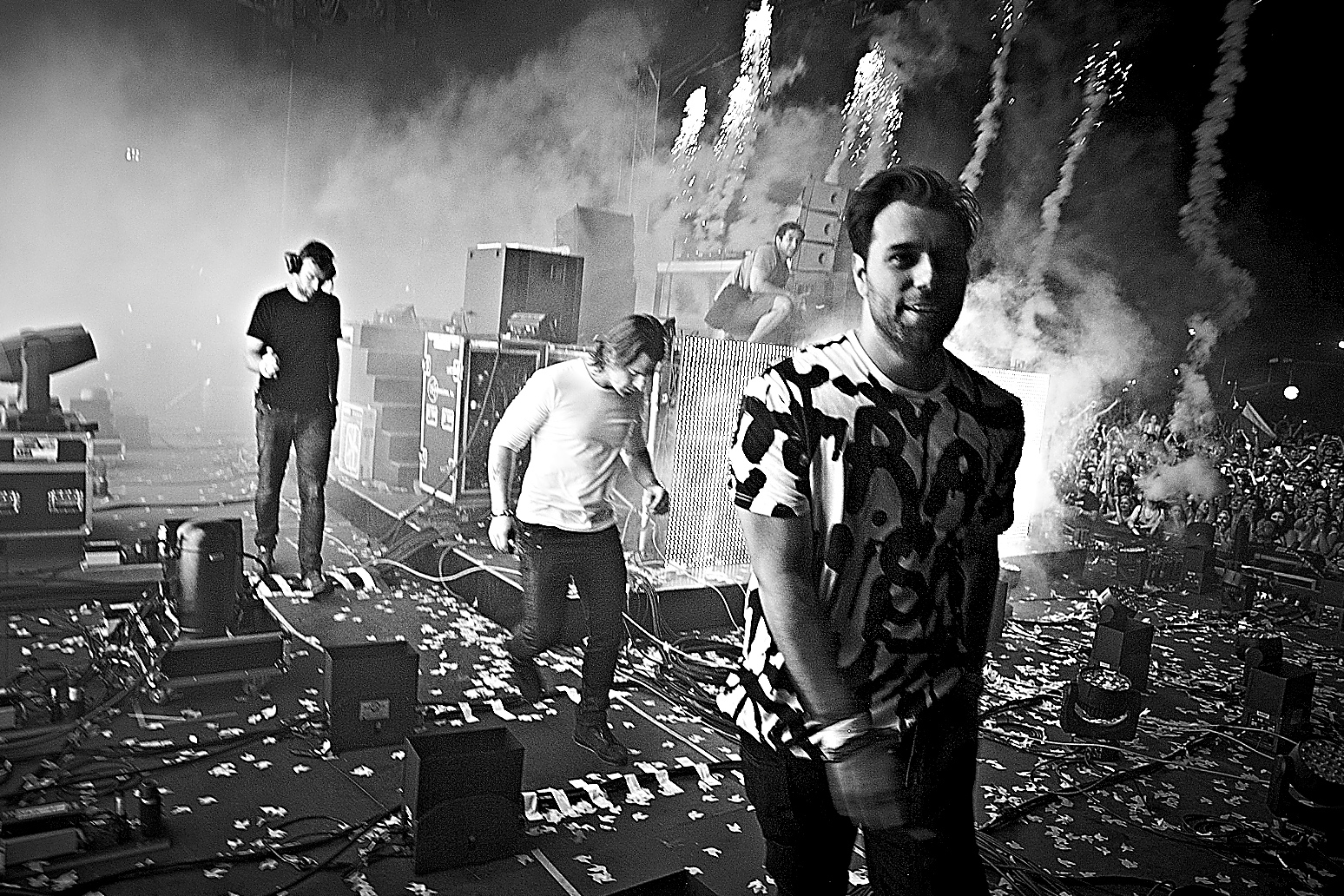
- Axwell & Ingrosso performing live in 2014

Background information
- Genres: Electro house; progressive house
- Instrument: Digital audio workstation
- Years active: 2014–2018; 2023–present
- Labels: Def Jam; Axtone; Refune
- Spinoff of: Swedish House Mafia
- Members: Axwell; Sebastian Ingrosso

Axwell & Ingrosso (stylised as Axwell Λ Ingrosso) are a Swedish DJ duo consisting of Swedish House Mafia members Axwell and Sebastian Ingrosso. They made their debut performance at the 2014 Governors Ball Music Festival in New York City in June.

== History ==
=== Pre-2013: Swedish House Mafia ===
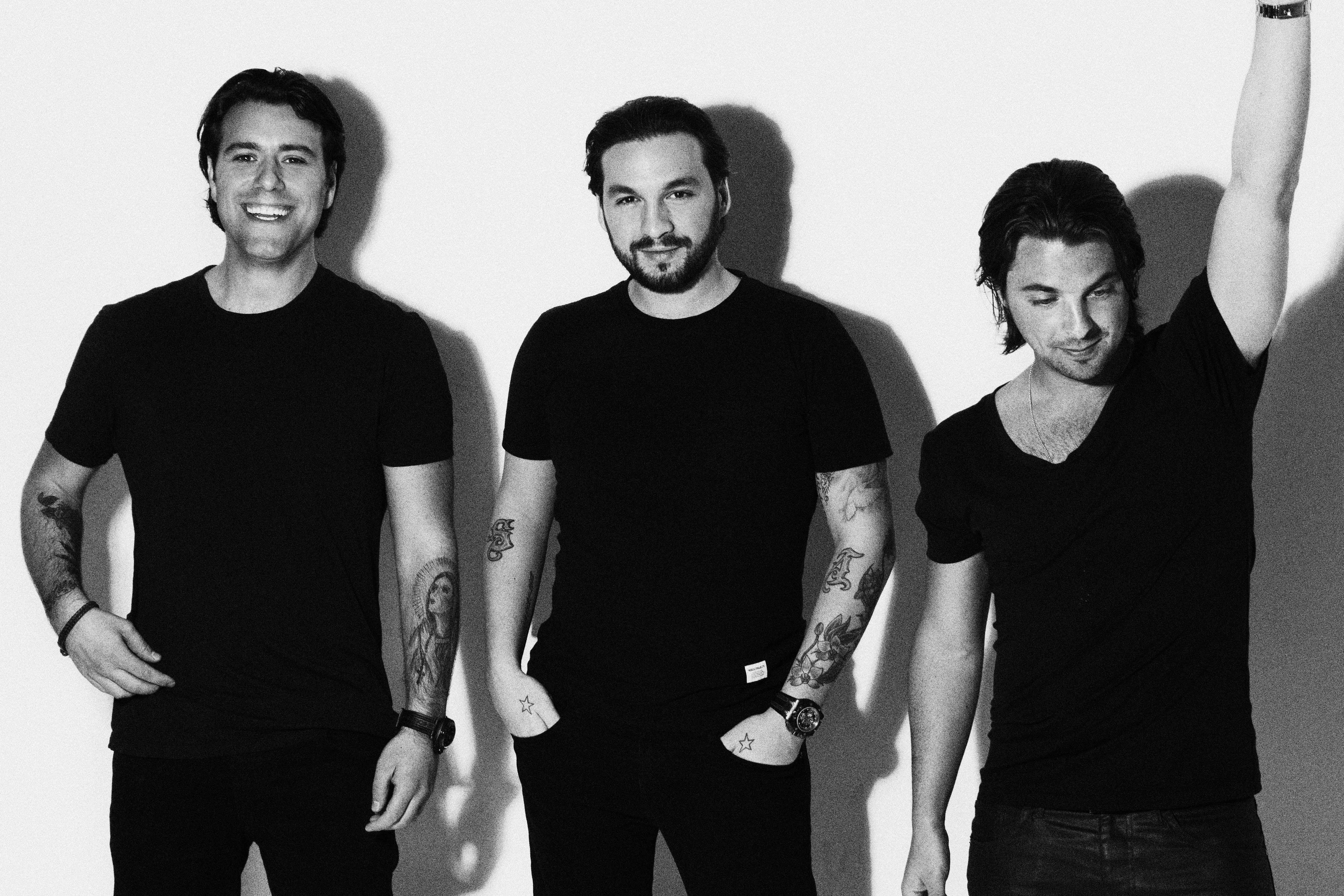
Ingrosso (left) and Axwell (right) with Steve Angello as the Swedish House Mafia.

Axwell and Sebastian Ingrosso were part of the Swedish DJ trio supergroup Swedish House Mafia, along with Steve Angello. The group officially formed in late 2008, ranking number ten on the DJ Magazine Top 100 DJ Poll 2011 and number twelve in 2012. During this time, the group released two studio/compilation albums, Until One and Until Now, and eight singles (with two credit under their individual names). On 24 June 2012, the group announced via their website that they would split up after embarking on "One Last Tour", which ended at Ultra Miami 2013 on 24 March 2013.

=== 2014: Formation and X4 ===
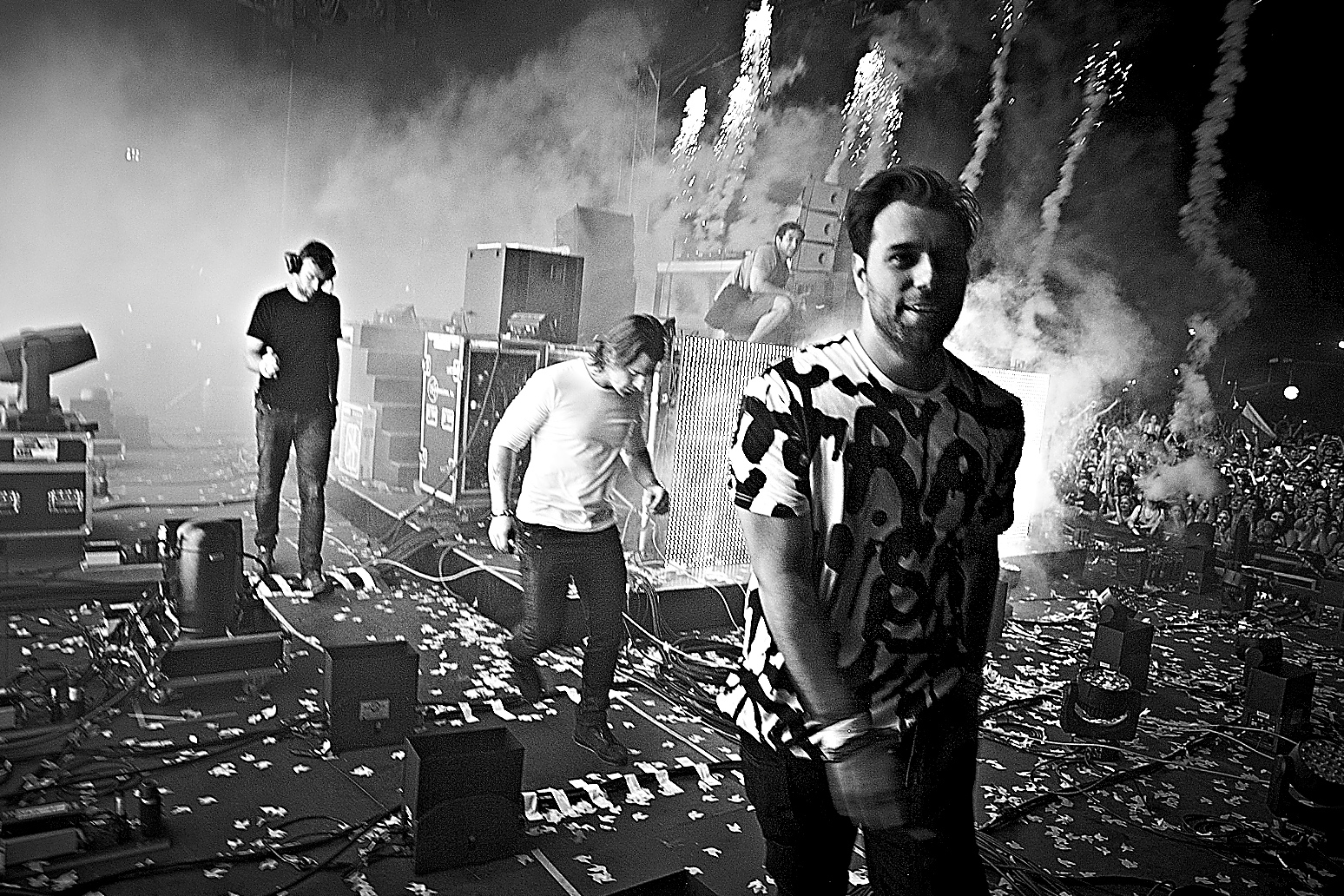
Axwell & Ingrosso in 2014 during their debut performance

Axwell and Ingrosso formed the group Axwell & Ingrosso officially in 2014. During June of that year, the band gained prominence among New Yorkers when they began placing clues about their new album in various locations throughout the city. Their first performance was in 2014 at the 8 June Governors Ball Music Festival in New York City. The performance debuted music from a new album they announced to release under the name Axwell & Ingrosso the intro music of which premiered on air during Zane Lowe's BBC Radio 1 program. Their performance was also named one of the 15 Hot Governors Ball Moments as well as one of the Top 10 Best Performances of the Hot Governors Ball by Billboard. They also made an appearance at the 2014 V Festival. The album is also said to be the first for both artists as Swedish House Mafia never released an official full-length studio album. Axwell and Ingrosso also deleted their personal Facebook pages and created a single page for the group to signify the new partnership. They toured India, as part of Sunburn Arena. On 14 February 2014, Axwell & Ingrosso released their debut EP X4. The EP contained the songs "Can't Hold Us Down", "We Come, We Rave, We Love" along with their 2007 collaboration "Together". The EP's final song, "Something New", was released as the group's first official single in November that year.

=== 2015–2017: Debut studio album and breakthrough ===
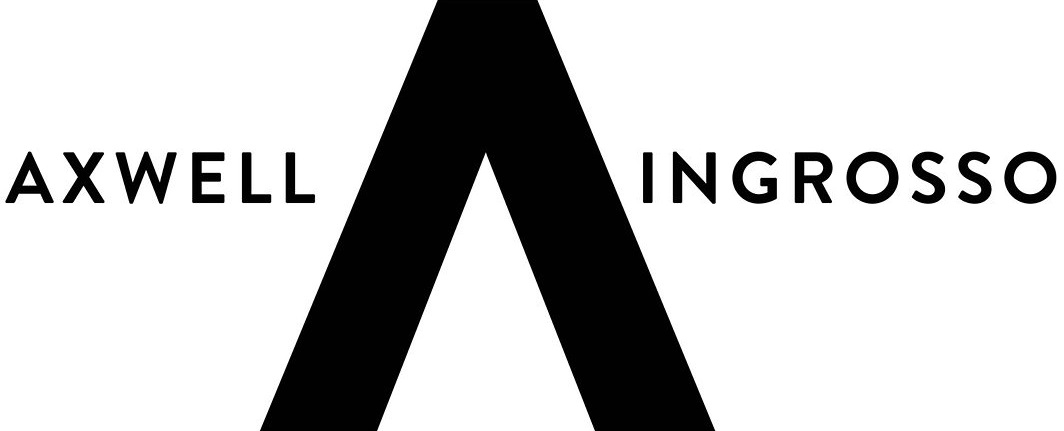
The Axwell Λ Ingrosso logo in 2015

==== Further releases ====
On 12 March 2015, the duo dropped their next new track, "On My Way" which features uncredited vocals from Vargas and Lagola. This was followed by a sequel video, directed by Christian Larson the next day which continued the story of the music video for "On My Way". This was the official music video for "Can't Hold Us Down", and was the day which "Can't Hold Us Down" saw an official release as a single. On 12 June 2015, they released their fourth single "Sun Is Shining" (also featuring uncredited vocals from Vargas and Lagola) which charted number one in Sweden giving the group their first number one single on a main singles' chart. In late July, the group made their Tomorrowland debut under their new collective debuting much new music. The group headlined the event and closed Night Two of the show.

On 6 November 2015, the duo released their fifth single "This Time" featuring uncredited vocals from Pusha T with all proceeds from the song going to charity. The instrumental for their new single "Dream Bigger" was released on 31 December 2015, with the vocal version being released on 29 April 2016 featuring uncredited vocals from Pharrell Williams. The group were to headline Tomorrowland again for the second time, performing again on Night Two but opening the show this year. Axwell also performed as a solo artist on the Axtone stage. On 10 February 2017, the duo released their eighth single "I Love You" featuring vocals from Kid Ink.

==== More Than You Know ====
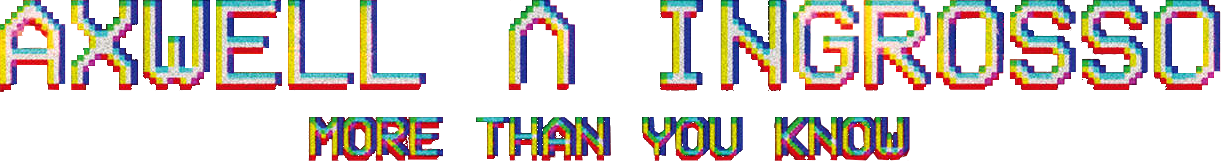
The Axwell Λ Ingrosso logo from the More Than You Know Album and EP

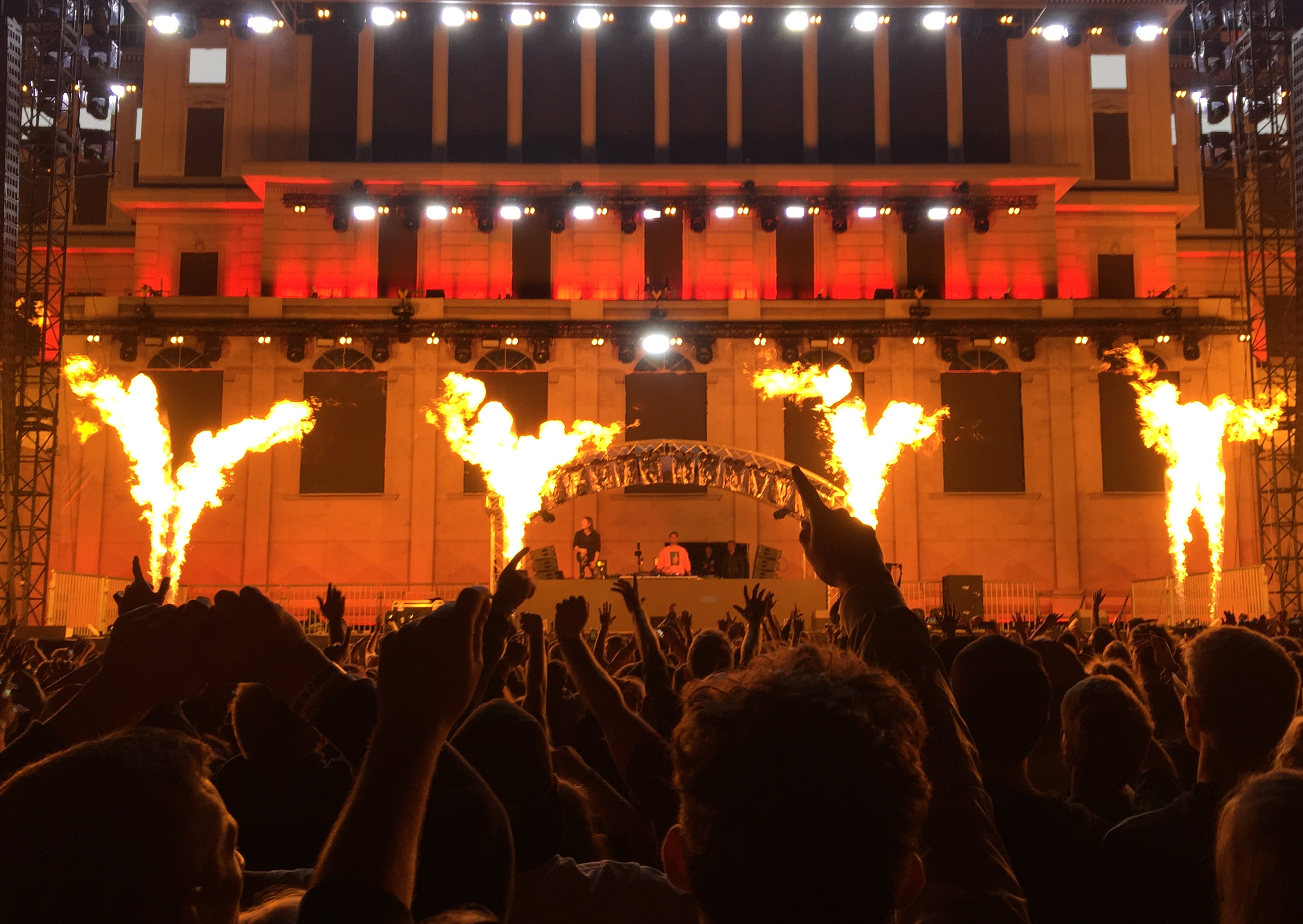
Axwell & Ingrosso performing at Airbeat One 2017

On 24 May 2017, Axwell & Ingrosso released their second EP More Than You Know after releasing their debut single from the EP, "Renegade", on 10 May 2017. On the day of the EP's release, the duo released the EP's first song "More Than You Know" as the group's tenth single. It is currently the group's most successful song commercially, gaining certifications in thirteen countries. In July, Axwell and Sebastian Ingrosso both performed solo at Tomorrowland with their collective also performing, headlining for the third consecutive year. 2017 was the first year the festival spanned two weeks (excluding its tenth anniversary in 2014). Axwell & Ingrosso were the penultimate acts for Night One on both weeks. On 8 December 2017, the duo released their debut studio album More Than You Know. It includes all their previously released singles, two bonus tracks ("Barricade" by Axwell and "Dark River" by Sebastian Ingrosso), as well as their new single "Dreamer" featuring vocals by Trevor Guthrie. The album peaked at number 12 on the Swedish album charts.

=== 2018: Swedish House Mafia reunion and Hiatus ===
After performing at multiple events during the first half of 2018, notably at Ultra Miami 2018 (the festival which also saw their collaboration with Steve Angello, Swedish House Mafia reunited after a five-year hiatus), the duo released house single "Dancing Alone" on 29 June 2018 featuring vocals from British singer RØMANS. The track's cover art displayed a picture of Paris Hilton which was used to promote the song through Instagram a day before its release. July and August 2018 saw the duo performing at music festivals including Tomorrowland as headliners for their fourth consecutive year. During the set they paid tribute to the late DJ Avicii by mixing his "Wake Me Up" with their "Don't You Worry Child", a song by the band which Avicii has previously stated to be one of his main influences. In August 2018, Axwell & Ingrosso announced that they would be going on hiatus in order to focus on the Swedish House Mafia reunion saying "We felt it was time, and we missed it". The three DJs announced that new music would be released in 2019 along with a Swedish House Mafia tour, with Steve Angello also confirming a show in Mexico and that Swedish House Mafia would play Tomorrowland 2019 "by any means necessary". Axwell and Sebastian Ingrosso announced that they are not disbanded and will return some time in the future, however, Sebastian Ingrosso also announced later that "this project may come to an end". The duo have continued to play at multiple live events.

== Discography ==
- More Than You Know (2017)

== Awards and nominations ==
=== DJ Awards ===
Year	Category	Work	Outcome	Ref.
2016	Best Big Room House DJ	—N/a	Nominated	
2016	Best International DJ	—N/a	Nominated	

=== DJ Magazine's top 100 DJs ===
Year	Position	Notes	Ref.
2015	17	New Entry	
2016	16	Up 1	
2017	21	Down 5	
2018	41	Down 20	

=== Grammis Awards ===
Year	Category	Work	Outcome	Ref.
2015	Best Song	"Sun Is Shining"	Nominated	
2016	Best Electronic / Dance	"Sun Is Shining"/"On My Way"	Nominated	
2018	Best Electronic / Dance	"More Than You Know"/"I Love You"	Won	
2018	Best Composer	—N/a	Nominated	

=== International Dance Music Awards ===
==== Pre-2016 ====
Year	Category	Work	Outcome	Ref.
2015	Best Group	—N/a	Won	

==== 2018—present ====
Year	Category	Work	Outcome	Ref.
2018	Best Song	"More Than You Know" (Note: No award ceremony was held in 2017. In 2018 winners were chosen by the Winter Music Conference themselves. 2019 marks the first year of public voting since the Winter Music Conference's restructure.)	Won	

=== MTV Europe Music Awards ===
Year	Category	Work	Outcome	Ref.
2017	Best Swedish Act	—N/a	Nominated	
2018	Best Swedish Act	—N/a	Nominated	

=== NRJ Music Awards ===
Year	Category	Work	Outcome	Ref.
2016	Best Collaboration of the Year	—N/a	Nominated	

=== WDM Radio Awards ===
Year	Category	Work	Outcome	Ref.
2017	Best Electro House DJ	—N/a	Nominated	
2018	Best Electro House DJ	—N/a	Nominated	
2018	Best Dancefloor Track	"More Than You Know"	Nominated	

=== YouTube Creator Awards ===
- Axwell Λ Ingrosso
  (1.8 million subscribers - July 2025)
