= Divine Sorrow =

Single by Wyclef featuring Avicii

from the EP J'ouvert
- Released: 17 November 2014
- Genre: EDM; progressive house
- Length: 4:38
- Label: Heads; PRMD
- Songwriters: Tim Bergling; Nel Ust Wyclef Jean; Magnus Lidehäll; Salem Al Fakir; Vincent Pontare
- Producer: Avicii

Wyclef Jean singles chronology
"Dar um Jeito (We Will Find a Way)" (2014)	"Divine Sorrow" (2014)	"Kiss The Sky" (2016)

Avicii singles chronology
"The Days" (2014)	"Divine Sorrow" (2014)	"The Nights" (2014)

Music video
- "Wyclef feat. Avicii Divine Sorrow" on YouTube

"Divine Sorrow" is a song by Haitian hip hop recording artist Wyclef Jean from his EP J'ouvert. Credited with the mononym Wyclef on the official cover of the single, it also features Swedish DJ and producer Avicii. The song was released as the lead single from the album on 17 November 2014. It was written by Magnus Lidehäll, Salem Al Fakir, and Vincent Pontare.

== Background ==
Wyclef Jean recorded the song with Avicii in Stockholm, Sweden in the winter of 2013. The song was released on 17 November 2014, as part of the campaign "Share the Sound of an AIDS-Free Generation" by Product Red project, a licensed brand that seeks to engage the private sector in raising awareness and funds to help fight the spread of HIV/AIDS in Africa.

This specific song was commissioned through Coca-Cola^{RED}. Proceeds from the song benefited the Global Fund to Fight AIDS, Tuberculosis and Malaria.

Wyclef Jean said of the song, "The whole idea with the song is, it's a celebration song. No matter what you're going through today, you're going to overcome it tomorrow."

== Music video ==
A colorful lyric video was released on November 17, 2014, with the color red prominently featured in the video to symbolize the RED campaign. The video displays a cream-colored background, over which clouds of red and light-gray liquid slowly fill the screen, while the song's lyrics appear overlaid.

A second lyric video was released on July 10, 2015. In this video, the Greek visual artist INO, along with several other people, including children and Wyclef Jean himself, paints the lyrics of the song on a wall. The concept is quite similar to the music video for Avicii's "The Days."

== Chart performance ==
"Divine Sorrow" debuted at number 12 on Billboard's Hot Dance/Electronic Songs chart, becoming Avicii's 13th single on the chart. The song also debuted at number 3 on the Dance/Electronic Digital Songs chart, selling 29,000 copies in its first week.

== Track listing ==
Digital download

1. "Divine Sorrow" (featuring Avicii) – 4:38

Digital download – Klingande Remix

1. "Divine Sorrow" (featuring Avicii; Klingande Remix) – 4:28

Digital download – Remix Pack 1

1. "Divine Sorrow" (featuring Avicii; extended) – 8:29
2. "Divine Sorrow" (featuring Avicii; GoldFish remix) – 8:28
3. "Divine Sorrow" (featuring Avicii; NightRider remix) – 4:41

== Charts ==
=== Weekly charts ===
Weekly chart performance for "Divine Sorrow"
Chart (2014-2015)	Peak position
Belgium (Ultratip Bubbling Under Flanders)	23
Belgium Dance (Ultratop Flanders)	29
France (SNEP)	105
Hungary (Stream Top 40)	32
Norway (VG-lista)	25
Spain (Promusicae)	38
Sweden (Sverigetopplistan)	7
UK Dance (Official Charts)	31
UK Indie (Official Charts)	9
UK Singles (Official Charts Company)	174
US Hot Dance/Electronic Songs (Billboard)	12

=== Year-end charts ===
Year-end chart performance for "Divine Sorrow"
Chart (2015)	Position
Sweden (Sverigetopplistan)	98
US Hot Dance/Electronic Songs (Billboard)	64
