= Moses and Taps =

European graffiti crew

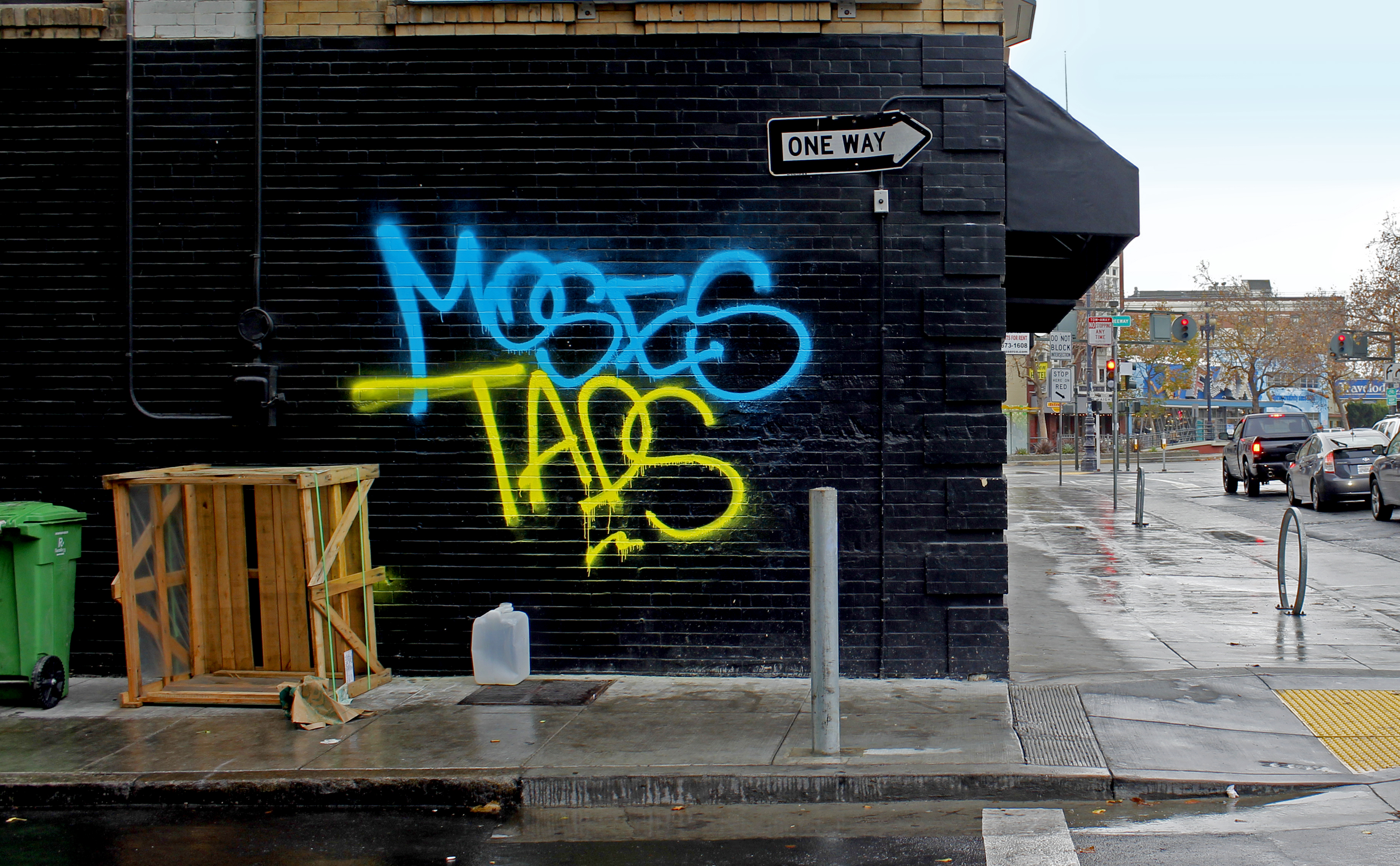
- Moses and Taps graffiti in San Francisco
- Style: Avant-garde
- Movement: Graffiti; Urban art; Post-graffiti
- Website: Official website

Moses and Taps, stylized as MOSES & TAPS™, are an artist collective based in Germany. Originally known for painting hundreds of whole-cars and whole-trains across Europe, MOSES & TAPS™ are now known for their conceptual practice that combines continued high-volume illegal train work with museum exhibitions, performances, and artist books. They are considered pioneers of the so-called “post-graffiti” or “graffiti on canvas” movement in Europe.

== History ==
The collective combines the pseudonyms of its two individual founders, Moses and Taps, who began painting graffiti art in 1994. The duo are believed to have been working collaboratively since 2007.

In 2017 Moses and Taps took part in the Viral Vandals exhibition at the MU Hybrid Art House alongside several other artists including Brad Downey, Good Guy Boris, and Utah & Ether.

Moses and Taps have produced various publications documenting their work. Their first book was titled International Topsprayer and documented the collective's project to paint graffiti on 1000 trains in 1000 days. Following the success of the publication, which was reputed to be one of the most widely read graffiti publications ever, Same Same was released in 2014. In 2019 Moses and Taps collaborated with the photographer Edward Nightingale to produce Memento Mori on the occasion of the Rose Béton Biennale. The following year Graffiti Avantgarde was released showcasing the work of Moses and Taps since 2011.

== Works ==
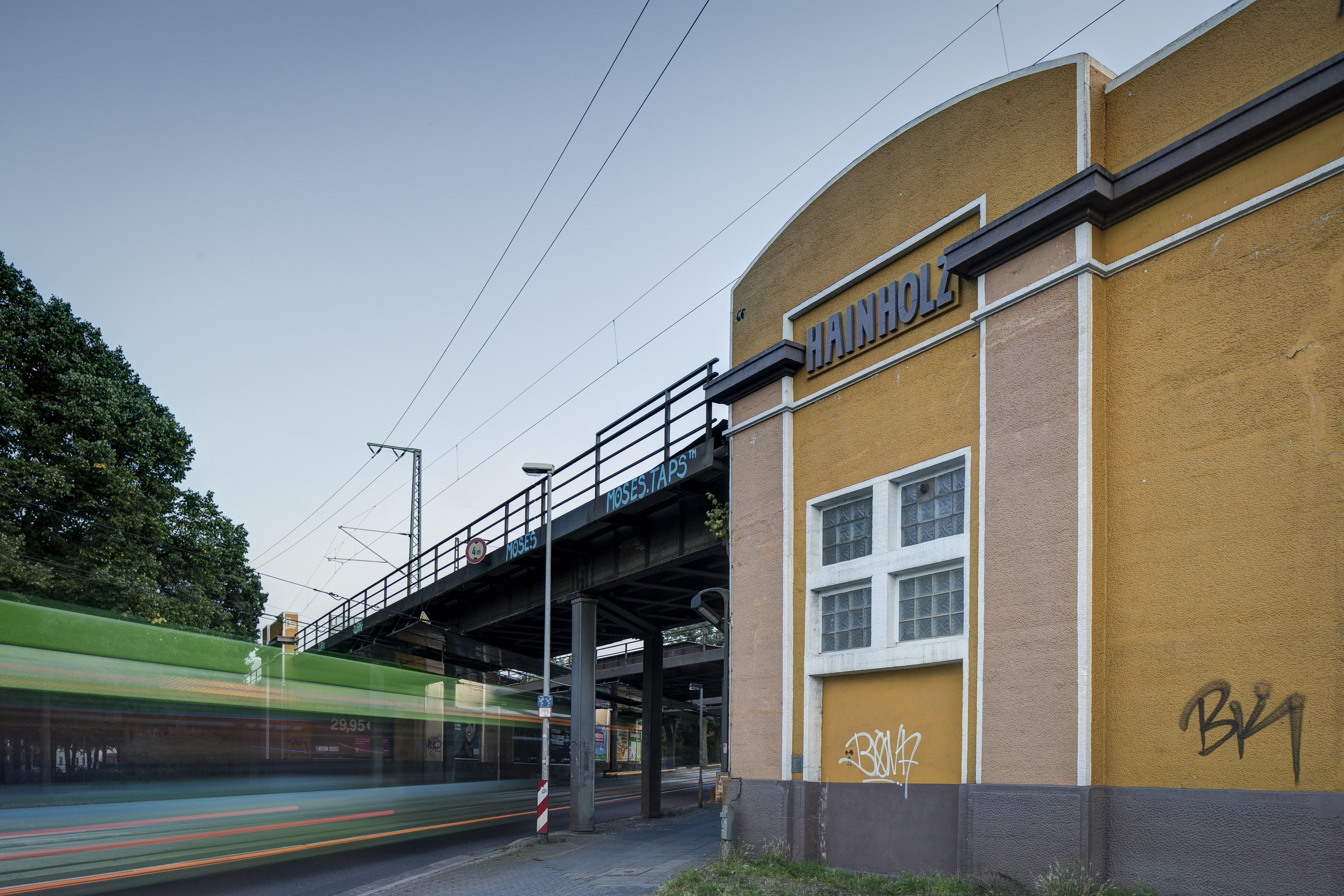
MOSES & TAPS™ tags adorn a railway bridge in Hanover, Germany.

In 2010 Moses and Taps attracted widespread attention when they created a mock door on the window of an Hanover S-Bahn train. The following year the collective produced an artwork in which 76 dollar bills were affixed to a Hamburg S-Bahn train spelling out the word ‘sellout’ as a critique of the commercialisation of urban art.

In April 2015 their action, The Wall, attracted international media attention. The collective noted in an interview that their piece had raised the absurdity of prosecuting them for such an action in the minds of the public. Following the media coverage of the Wall it was later revealed that Deutsche Bahn had lied about the costs incurred in removing the artwork.

In 2018, a work entitled Das Kann Ich Auch, painted by Moses and Taps in 2013, sold for €11,700 in an auction at the Parisian auction house Artcurial.

== Selected exhibitions ==
- 2012 – Achtung: Asphaltkultur - German Graffiti Avantgarde at Goethe-Institut, Bangalore, India alongside Harald Naegeli among others.
- 2014 – Fairytales at Museum of Contemporary Art Taipei, Taipei, Taiwan.
- 2015 – Bundeskunsthall of Fame at Bundeskunsthalle in Bonn, Germany.
- 2016 – Corporate Identity at Golden Hands Gallery, Hamburg, Germany.
- 2018 – Bügelfeuer at Güterbahnhofs Bremen, Bremen, Germany alongside Berlin Kidz and Bill Daniel among others.
- 2020 – Local Heroes: Marseille & Berlin, alongside 1UP, at Musée Regards de Provence, Marseille, France.
- 2026 – Under the Milky Way. Abstraction, Autonomy and Post-Vandalist Tendencies in Contemporary Art, Kunstverein Hannover. Participating artists: Amos Angeles, Alexandre Bavard, Cäcilia Brown, Stephen Burke, Bus126, Brad Downey and Akim, Antwan Horfee, Hams Klemens, Klub7, Daniel Laufer, Mischa Leinkauf, Martina Morger, Christoph und Sebastian Mügge, Patrick Niemann, Rocco und seine Brüder, Veli Silver, Mathias Weinfurter, Angst Yok.

== Publications ==
- Moses and Taps (2011). International Topsprayer. Germany: Publikat Verlags und Handels KG. ISBN 978-3939566359.
- Moses and Taps (2014). Same Same. EU: The Grifters Publishing.
- Moses and Taps (2019). Memento Mori. Germany: Gutenburg Beuys Feindruckerei.
- Moses and Taps (2020). Graffiti Avantgarde. The Grifters Publishing. ISBN 978-3939566540.
- Moses and Taps (2021). Topsprayer Expired. Germany: Publikat. ISBN 978-3939566571.
