= List of painters by name beginning with "I" =

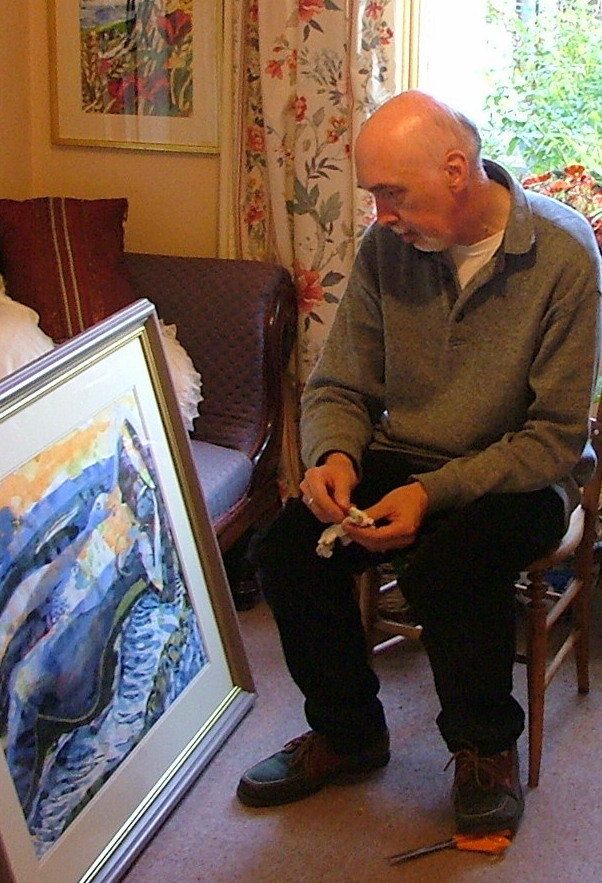
David Imms

Please add names of notable painters with a Wikipedia page, in precise English alphabetical order, using U.S. spelling conventions. Country and regional names refer to where painters worked for long periods, not to personal allegiances.

- Ike no Taiga (池大雅, 1723–1776) Japanese painter and calligrapher
- Leiko Ikemura (born 1951), Japanese-Swiss painter and sculptor
- Jörg Immendorff (1945–2007), German painter, sculptor and stage designer
- David Imms (born 1945), English artist and painter
- Domenico Induno (1815–1878), Italian painter
- Rudolph F. Ingerle (1879–1950), American landscape painter
- John Stuart Ingle (1933–2010), American artist
- Jean Auguste Dominique Ingres (1780–1867), French painter
- George Inness (1829–1894), American landscape painter
- James Dickson Innes (1887–1914), Welsh/English painter
- INO (living), Greek visual artist
- Inoue Naohisa (井上直久, born 1948), fantasy artist
- Dahlov Ipcar (1917–2017), American painter, illustrator and author
- Albert Irvin (1922–2015), English abstract artist
- Vincenzo Irolli (1860–1949), Italian painter.
- Wilson Irvine (1869–1936), American landscape painter
- Eugène Isabey (1803–1886), French painter, draftsman, and printmaker
- Rolf Iseli (born 1934), Swiss painter
- Adriaen Isenbrant (1490?–1551), Flemish Northern Renaissance painter
- Kinichiro Ishikawa (石川欽一郎, 1871–1945), Japanese painter
- Jozef Israëls (1824–1911), Dutch oil and watercolor painter and etcher
- Itagaki Yoshio (板垣由雄, born 1967), Japanese artist and photographer
- Itō Jakuchū (伊藤若冲, 1716–1800), Japanese painter
- Itō Ogura Yonesuke (1870–1940), Japanese/American artist
- Itō Seiu (伊藤晴雨, 1882–1961), Japanese kinbaku painter
- Itō Shinsui (伊東深水, 1898–1972), Japanese painter and woodblock printer
- Johannes Itten (1888–1967), Swiss painter, writer and theorist
- Alexander Ivanov (1806–1858), Russian painter
- Béla Iványi-Grünwald (1867–1940), Hungarian painter
- Oton Iveković (1869–1939), Austro-Hungarian/Yugoslav (Croatian) painter
- Iwasa Matabei (岩佐又兵衛, 1578–1650), Japanese artist
