= Get Busy Living =

Album by Goldfish

Studio album by Goldfish
- Released: September 20, 2010
- Recorded: 2009–2010
- Studio: Goldfish Studios
- Genre: Electronica
- Label: Goldfish Music – GM0002; Sony Music

Goldfish chronology
| Perceptions of Pacha REMIXED (2009) | Get Busy Living (2010) | Goldfish (2012) |

Get Busy Living is a studio album by Goldfish. Released on September 20, 2010 through Goldfish Music and Sony Music, in 2011 it won Best Global Dance Album at the 17th South African Music Awards.

== Track listing ==
All tracks are written by Goldfish

| No. | Title | {{{extra_column}}} | Length |
|---|---|---|---|
| 1. | "Crunchy Joe" (feat. Sakhile Moleshe) | | 3:19 |
| 2. | "Get Busy Living" (feat. Emily Bruce) | | 5:40 |
| 3. | "Show You How" | | 3:21 |
| 4. | "Call Me" (feat. Monique Hellenberg) | | 3:50 |
| 5. | "Humbug" (feat. Sakhile Moleshe) | | 3:44 |
| 6. | "Brush Your Hair" | | 5:03 |
| 7. | "We Come Together" (feat. Sakhile Moleshe) | | 3:48 |
| 8. | "In Too Deep" (feat. Emily Bruce) | | 5:07 |
| 9. | "My Rainbow" | | 7:21 |
| 10. | "Big Band Wolf" | | 5:32 |
| 11. | "Get Busy Living" (feat. Emily Bruce) | Radio Edit | 3:50 |

== Awards and nominations ==
| Year | Award | Nominated work | Category | Result |
|---|---|---|---|---|
| 2011 | 17th South African Music Awards | Get Busy Living | Best Global Dance Album | Won |
| 2011 | 17th South African Music Awards | Get Busy Living | Record of the Year | Nominated |
| 2011 | 17th South African Music Awards | Goldfish | Best Producer | Nominated |

== Personnel ==
- Goldfish - primary artist
