= Berlin Kidz =

Berlin collective

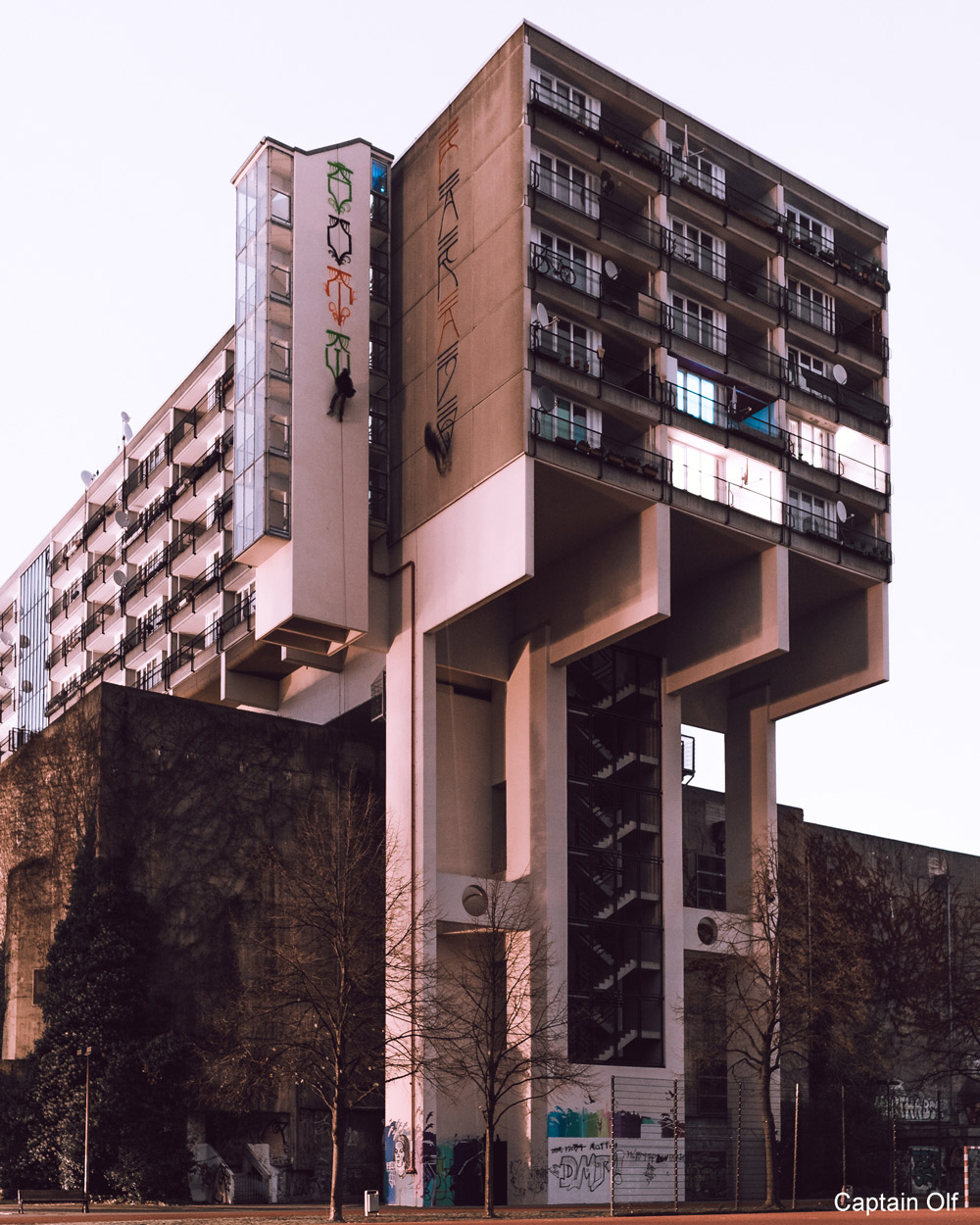
- Berlin Kidz Hochbunker Pallasstraße, Schöneberg 2018
- Established: around
- Founder: Mr. Paradox Paradise
- Founded at: Berlin
- Notable work: ‘‘Berlin Kidz 1’’ (2013), ‘‘Berlin Kidz 2’’ (2017)
- Style: Graffiti; Tagging
- Movement: Graffiti; Parkour; Train surfing
- Website: BerlinKidzOffical on Facebook

Berlin Kidz is a collective from Kreuzberg, Berlin combining graffiti, train surfing, and parkour into a performative visual practice. They are considered one of the most influential graffiti crews in Berlin known both for their trademark graffiti lettering and action videos. Mr. Paradox Paradise typically utilise the colours red and blue as symbols of blood and freedom respectively. In an interview, he stated that the motivation for their artwork is to highlight social issues and bring them to the attention of the public, using political slogans such as Hartz IV essen Seele auf (transl. Hartz IV Eats the Soul) or Moderne Sklaverei (transl. Modern Slavery). The collective deliberately targets difficult-to-access and tall buildings in order to be as visible and long-lasting as possible (known as Heaven Spots). Aside from graffiti they have filmed themselves on numerous occasions whilst train surfing on Berlin S-Bahn and U-Bahn rolling stock and publishing it on YouTube.

== Exhibitions ==
In 2017, Berlin Kidz collaborated with the Urban Nation museum as part of their One Wall project, alongside James Bullough and 1UP. The following year the group partiticapated in the Bügelfeuer exhibition of railway culture hosted at Güterbahnhofs Bremen, a disused freight yard located directly next to Bremen Hauptbahnhof, alongside other artists including Bill Daniel and MOSES & TAPS™.

== Founding and members ==
Berlin Kidz was founded in the late 2000s by Berlin-based artist and filmmaker Mr. Paradox Paradise (a.k.a. Paradox), who had earlier created the crew ÜF (Über Freaks). Paradox initiated the video project Berlin Kidz, merging graffiti, parkour, and climbing into a single visual language on media and expanded classic graffiti into performative art actions in urban spaces. Early collaborations with other Berlin graffiti crews, including projects associated with 1UP, influenced the visual language of the Berlin graffiti scene. He is credited with developing the vertical lettering style, later termed Paraglyphs, in Europe and continues to work on the upcoming film.

== Media ==
After following the group during numerous actions over a four year period the German photographer Thomas von Wittich exhibited his documentary images of the Berlin Kidz at an exhibition titled Adrenaline as part of the European Month of Photography in 2016. In 2017, the documentary Grifters Code 6: Über Freaks, focusing on the illegal activities of the Berlin Kidz collective was released.

To date Paradox has produced two Berlin Kidz graffiti movies including the 2014 film Berlin Kidz – 100% Pure Adrenaline and an hour long documentary Fuck the System. In 2021, Paradox released the documentary film Spiritual Letters, which premiered at the Babylon Berlin cinema. The film was reviewed in several cultural media outlets, including Lodown Magazine and Urban Shit, and features scenes from Berlin's urban art scene. Spiritual Letters also received international attention, for example through a screening in 2024 at the CULTPLEX cinema in Manchester. He also released short recordings of artistic practice such as the 2018 promotional video Change your Frequency.

== Films ==
- “Berlin Kidz – 100% Adrenaline” (2013/2014)
- “Berlin Kidz 2: Fuck the System” (2017)
- Change Your Frequency (2018)

Collaborations

- Graffiti Olympics (2018). A collaborative drone video project with the crew 1UP

== Gallery ==
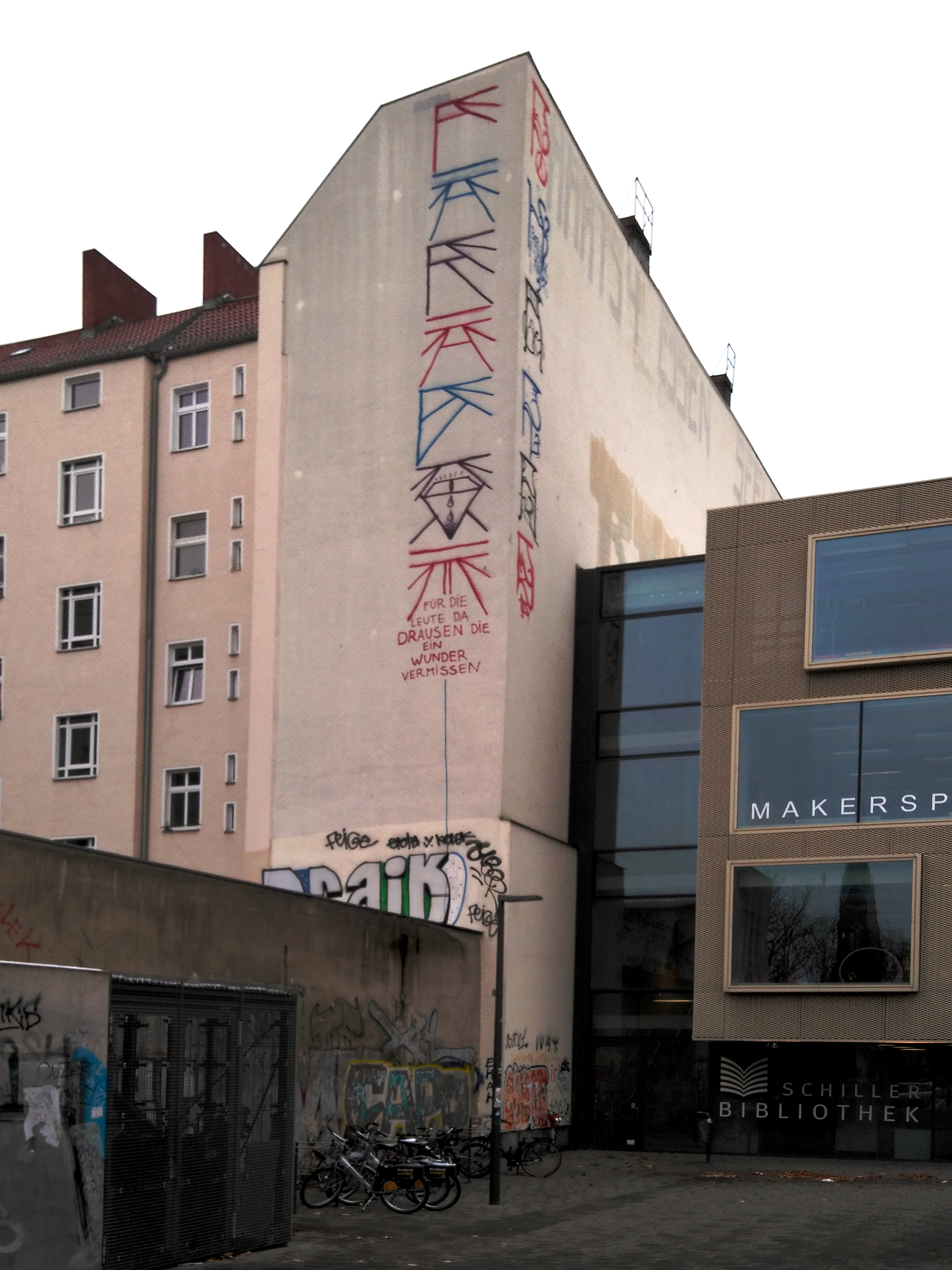
The trademark graffiti of Berlin Kidz on a building in Wedding, Berlin

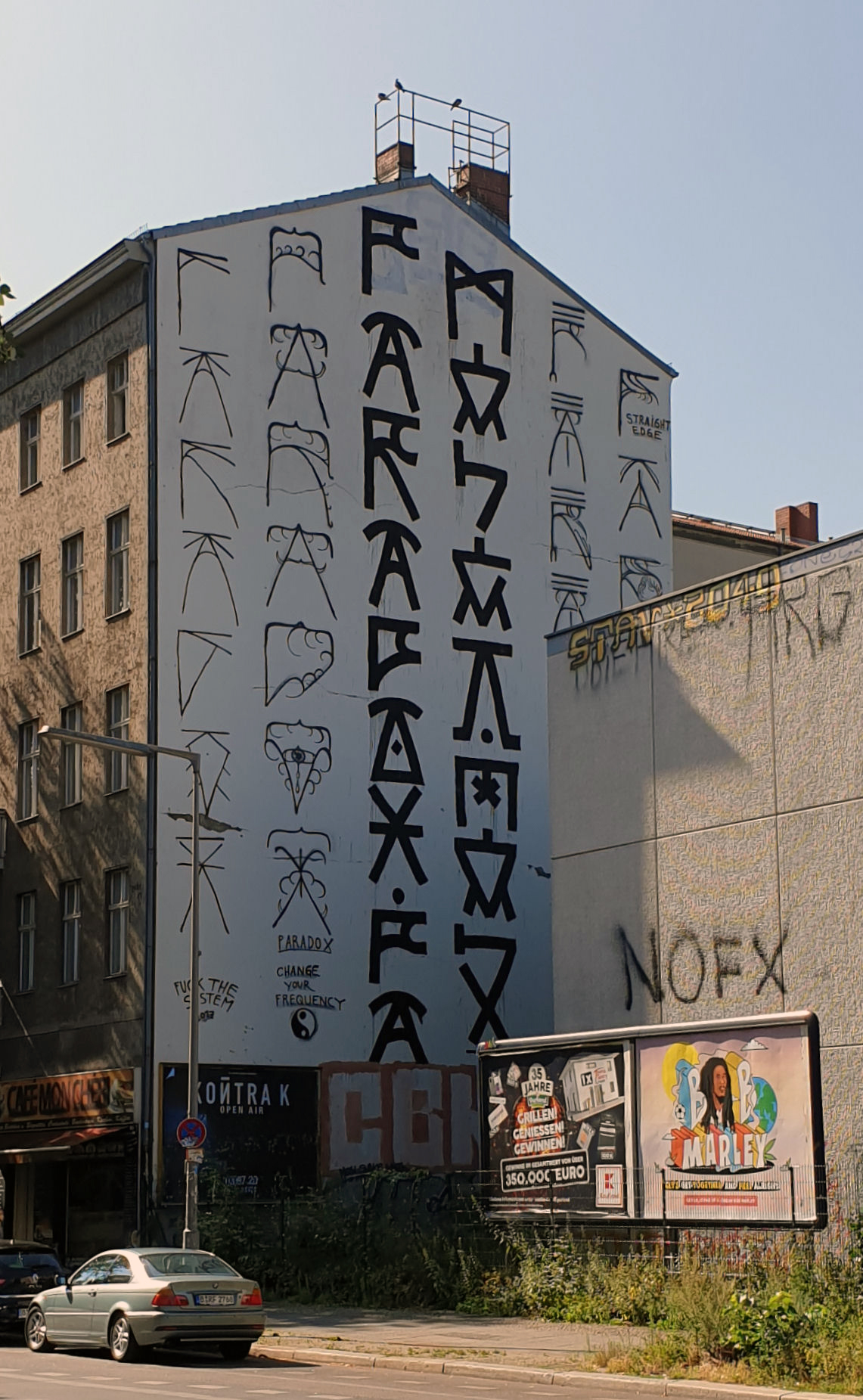
Change Your Frequency mural on a building in Kreuzberg

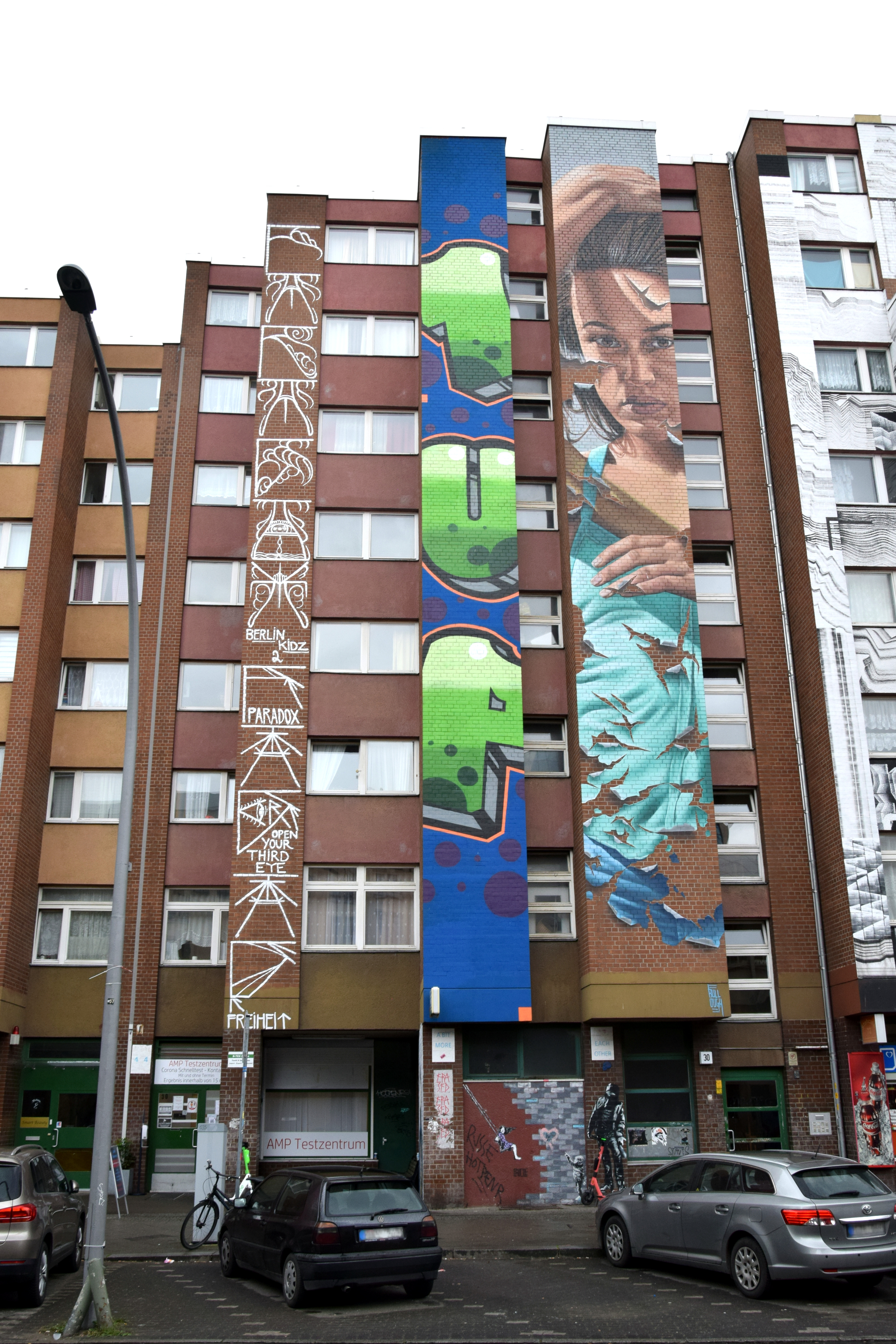
One Wall Project with Berlin Kidz, 1UP and James Bullough Urban Nation, Schöneberg

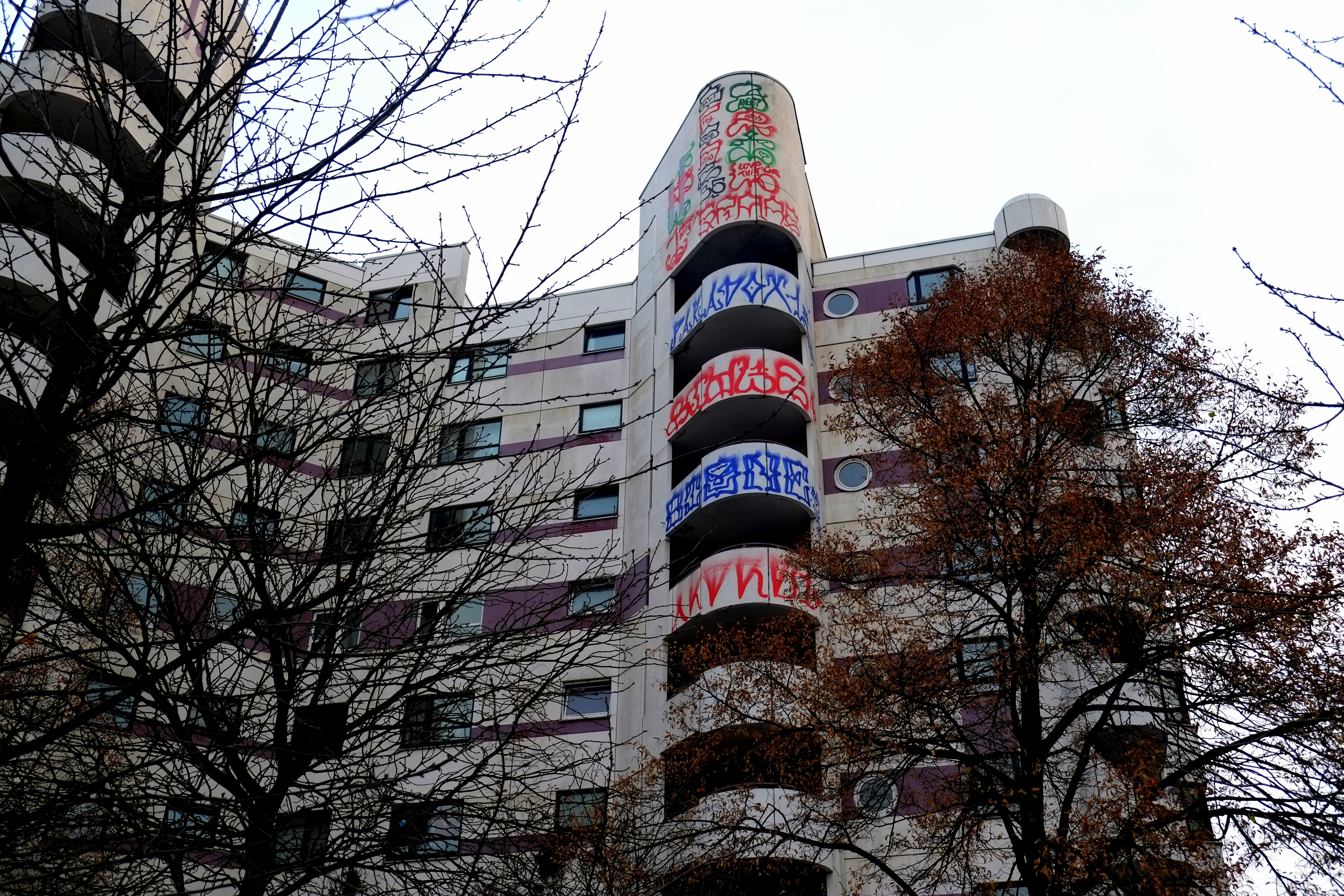
A typical example of artwork by Berlin Kidz adorning a residential building by Kottbusser Tor, Kreuzberg
