= Helene Hegemann =

German writer, director and actress (born 1992)

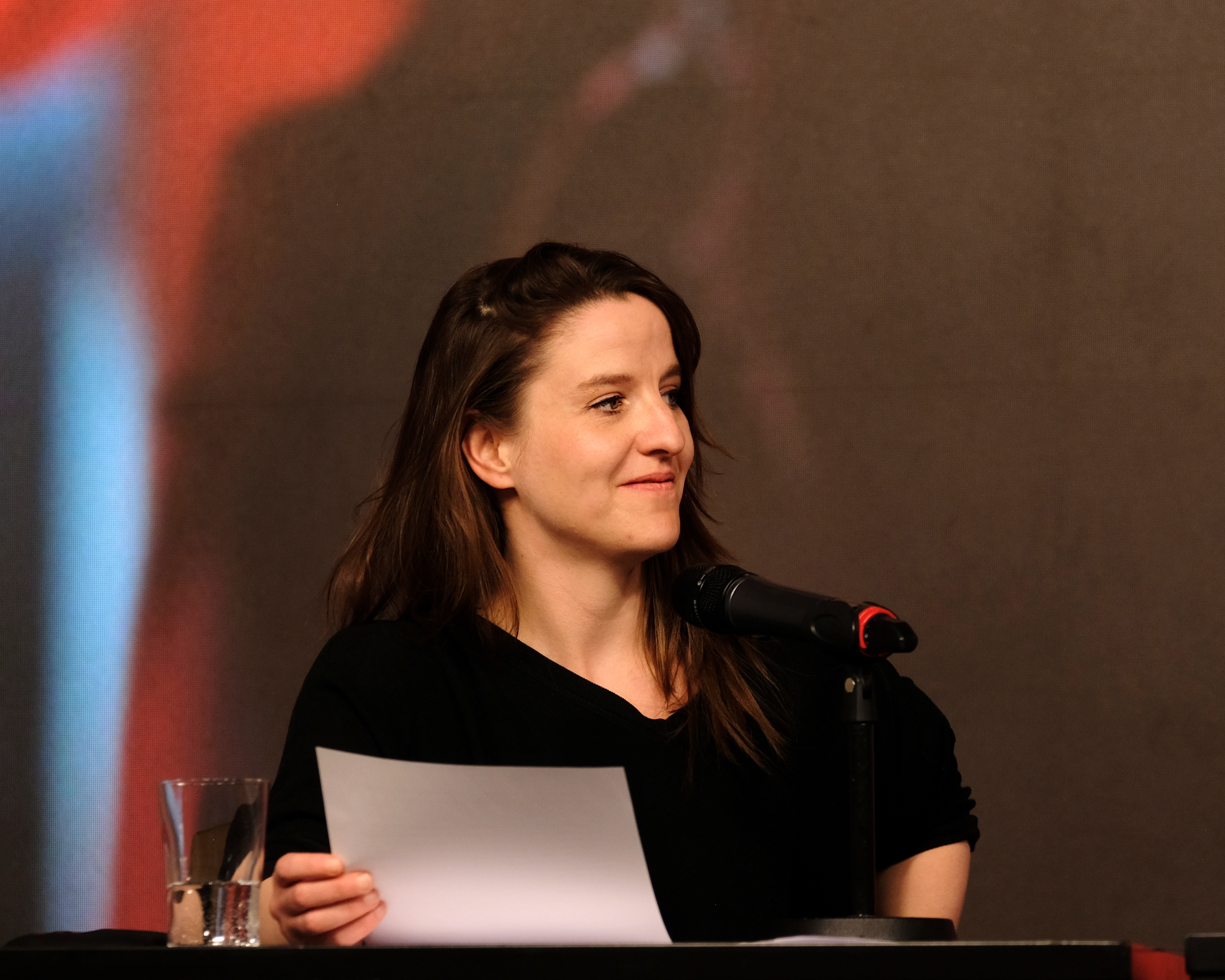
- Hegemann in 2025
- Born: 19 February 1992 (age 34); Freiburg im Breisgau, Baden-Württemberg, Germany
- Occupations: Writer; director; actress
- Partner: Andrea Hanna Hünniger

Helene Hegemann ( (born 19 February 1992 in Freiburg im Breisgau) is a German writer, director, and actress. When she was a young writer her work was highly praised, but her first novel, Axolotl Roadkill, sparked a plagiarism controversy. The book has since been translated into various languages.

== Life ==
She was raised by her divorced mother, a graphic artist and painter. After her mother's death, Hegemann moved in with her father. She began writing and first gained attention with her blog. On 6 December 2007, her play, Ariel 15 premiered in Berlin at Ballhaus Ost, directed by Sebastian Mauksch. Hegemann called her play a literary fairy tale piece. Deutschland Radio adapted it as a radio drama in 2008. That same year, a screenplay she wrote at 14 was developed. It was underwritten by the Federal Cultural Foundation. The resulting film, Torpedo, a youth drama, premiered in 2008 at the Hof International Film Festival and ran in German cinemas in summer 2009. It won the Max Ophüls Prize. Hegemann credits the Jean-Luc Godard film Weekend as a major influence on her writing style.

In 2009, Hegemann played a character in the episodic film Germany 09, by Nicolette Krebitz. Hegemann appeared in the segment "Die Unvollendete", where Ulrike Meinhof and Susan Sontag meet.

In 2013 her second novel Jage zwei Tiger and in 2018 the third novel Bungalow were published. In 2025 Kiepenheuer & Witsch published Striker. According to the author’s own statement and her acknowledgements in the book, Striker is based on Urban Street Artist Mr. Paradox Paradise.

Hegemann lives in Berlin.

== Works ==
=== Books ===
- Axolotl Roadkill, Ullstein, 22 January 2010, ISBN 978-3-550-08792-9
- Axolotl Roadkill / druk 1, Translator Marcel Misset, Arbeiderspers, 2010, ISBN 978-90-295-7359-7
- Roadkill, Translator Isabella Amico Di Meane, Einaudi Stile Libero, 2010, ISBN 978-88-06-20507-2
- Axolotl Roadkill, Constable & Robinson Limited, 2012, ISBN 978-1-84901-054-2
- Jage zwei Tiger, Hanser, 26 August 2013, ISBN 978-3-446-24367-5
- Bungalow, Hanser, Berlin 2018, ISBN 978-3-446-25317-9
- Striker, Kiepenheuer & Witsch, Köln 2025, ISBN 978-3-462-00595-0

=== Movies ===
- Torpedo, 2008, (Director, Writer)
- Axolotl Overkill, 2017 (Director, Writer)

== See also ==
- List of female film and television directors
- List of lesbian filmmakers
- List of LGBT-related films directed by women
