= Goldfish (band) =

South African electronic music duo

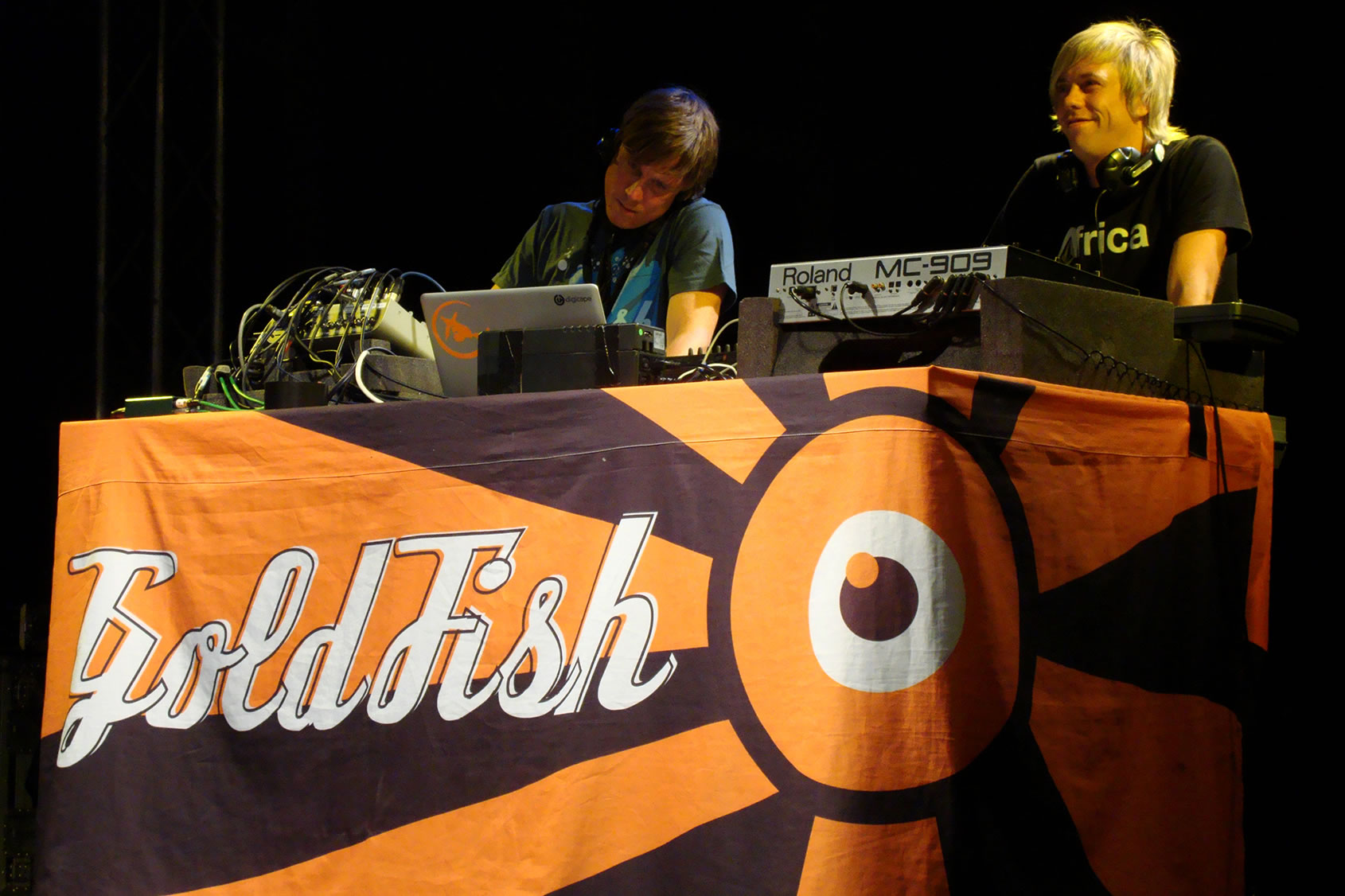
- David Poole (left) and Dominic Peters (right)

Background information
- Origin: Cape Town, South Africa
- Genres: Nu jazz, house, deep house, trip hop, downtempo, electro swing
- Years active: 2004–present
- Labels: Spinnin' Records, Armada Music, Goldfish Music, EMI, Casablanca Records
- Members: Dominic Peters; David Poole
- Website: GoldfishLive.com

GoldFish is an electronic music duo originating from Cape Town, South Africa, now residing in San Diego, California consisting of Dominic Peters and David Poole. They create dance music containing elements of house, pop, jazz and African music. The band has released a number of albums, including their latest If Summer Was A Sound (available on Vinyl) and previous albums: Late Night People, Three Second Memory, Perceptions of Pacha, Get Busy Living. and their Debut album Caught in the Loop (available on Vinyl). They were named "Best Pop" at the MTV Africa Music Awards 2014.

== History ==
=== Founding and early years ===
One of the group's early logos

Dominic Peters and David Poole founded GoldFish in Cape Town, South Africa. The two jazz musicians had first met while studying music at college. After the 2006 release of their debut album Caught in the Loop, the group went on to open for artists such as Fatboy Slim, Mr Scruff, Audio Bullys, Stereo MC's. Basement Jaxx, Faithless, Paul van Dyk, and Pete Tong. GoldFish was nominated for the Best Alternative category at the first MTV Africa Music Awards 2008 but did not win.

They released their album Perceptions of Pacha on 29 August 2008. In 2009, they set a new South African Music Awards record for most nominations, with eight nominations including Best Duo or Group and Album of the Year, winning Best Engineer and Best Dance Album. Their album GoldFish spent three weeks on the Dutch Albums Top 100 chart, peaking at No. 44 in 2012.

=== Recent touring and releases ===
External videos
- GoldFish – "Fort Knox" (ft. Sakhile Moleshe) – Official Music Video (7 October 2009)
- GoldFish – "Take Back Tomorrow" – Official Music Video (8 March 2013)

In 2011, their album Get Busy Living won at the South African Music Awards. A number of their singles have also been used commercially. An advertisement for the Kia Soul automobile featured their track "Fort Knox." Nike recently used the song "Washing Over Me" featuring Morning Parade in the advertisement of the Nike+ App. "Washing Over Me" was also featured in the Castle Lager advert for the Castle Lager Incoming Series. "Washing Over Me" also reached No. 1 on the 5FM Top 40 in July 2012.

Their 2013 album Three Second Memory reached No. 89 on the Dutch Albums Top 100. GoldFish was named "Best Pop" at the MTV Africa Music Awards 2014. On 15 December 2014, GoldFish released a remix of the Wyclef Jean and Avicii song "Divine Sorrow" exclusively through Billboard. At that point the duo had performed at festivals such as Glastonbury and Ultra Music Festival, and in March 2015 they performed at SXSW.

== Musical style ==
They create dance music containing elements of jazz and African music, combining live instruments like double bass, saxophones, keyboards, flute, and vocals with samplers, effects and synths.

== Members ==
- Dominic Peters – production, keyboards, upright bass, bass guitar
- David Poole – production, saxophone, flute, vocals

== Awards and nominations ==
Year	Award	Nominated work	Category	Result
2008	MTV Africa Music Awards	GoldFish	Best Alternative	Nominated
2009	15th South African Music Awards	GoldFish	Best Engineer	Won
2009	15th South African Music Awards	Perceptions of Pacha	Best Dance Album	Won
2009	15th South African Music Awards	Perceptions of Pacha	Album of the Year	Nominated
2009	15th South African Music Awards	GoldFish	Best Duo or Group	Nominated
2009	15th South African Music Awards	GoldFish	Best Alternative Music: English	Nominated
2009	15th South African Music Awards	GoldFish	Best Producer	Nominated
2009	15th South African Music Awards			Nominated
2009	15th South African Music Awards	"This Is How It Goes"	Record of the Year	Nominated
2011	17th South African Music Awards	Get Busy Living	Best Global Dance Album	Won
2011	17th South African Music Awards	Get Busy Living	Record of the Year	Nominated
2011	17th South African Music Awards	GoldFish	Best Producer	Nominated
2014	MTV Africa Music Awards	GoldFish	Best Pop	Won

== Discography ==
=== Albums ===
Albums by GoldFish
Year	Album title	Release details	Chart peaks
Year	Album title	Release details	Dutch 100
2006	Caught in the Loop	Released: 29 May 2006; Label: GoldFish / Pioneer; Format: CD, digital download	–
2008	Perceptions of Pacha	Released: 21 April 2008; Label: Pacha / SBME Africa; Format: CD, digital download	–
2009	Perceptions of Pacha Remixed	Released: 17 November 2009; Label: GoldFish; Format: CD, digital download	–
2010	Get Busy Living	Released: 20 September 2010; Label: GoldFish Music; Format: CD, digital download	–
2012	GoldFish	Released: 6 June 2012; Label: EMI; Format: CD, digital download	44
2013	Three Second Memory	Released: 15 October 2013; Label: GoldFish Music / Casablanca; Format: CD, digital download	89
2017	Late Night People	Released: 6 October 2017; Label: Armada Music / Sony Music South Africa; Format: CD, digital download, vinyl	—
2023	If Summer Was A Sound	Released: 29 September 2023; Label: Goldfish Music / Sony Music South Africa; Format: Streaming	—
"—" denotes a recording that did not chart or was not released in that territory.

=== Singles ===
Incomplete list of songs by GoldFish
Year	Title	Chart peaks		Album	Release details
Year	Title	5FM 40	—	Album	Release details
2007	"Coming Home"	—	—	3-track single	Pacha Recordings (22 June 2007)
2008	"Pure Pacha"	—	—	Single only	Pacha Recordings (2008)
2009	"Cruising Through"	—	—	Single/remix EP	Pacha Multimedia (15 May 2009)
2009	"Fort Knox"	—	—	Fort Knox (Remixes) – EP	Pacha Recordings (15 May 2009)
2009	"Wet Welly"	—	—	Single only	Pacha Multimedia (3 June 2009)
2009	"Sold My Soul"	—	—	2 track single	Pacha Recordings (3 July 2009)
2009	"Are You Lulu"	—	—	2-track single	Pacha Multimedia (3 July 2009)
2009	"This is How it Goes"	—	—	Single	Pacha Recordings (13 November 2009)
2009	"Hold Tight"	—	—	Single	Pacha Recordings (20 November 2009)
2010	"Just For Tonight"	—	—	Single	Pacha Recordings (8 January 2010)
2011	"Let's Do It Again" (with Freshlyground)	—	—	Single	Freeground Records (15 July 2011)
2012	"Washing Over Me" (feat. Morning Parade)	1	—	GoldFish	GoldFish Music (2012)
2013	"Take Back Tomorrow"	—	—	Three Second Memory	GoldFish Music (2013)
2013	"Just For Tonight"	—	—	2-track single	Pacha Recordings (11 March 2013)
2013	"Soundtracks & Comebacks"	—	—	Remix EP	Pacha Recordings (11 March 2013)
2014	"Choose Your Own Adventure"	—	—	Choose Your Own Adventure – EP	GoldFish Music (17 June 2014)
2015	"The Storm" (with DIMMI)	—	—	Single	SPRS (20 July 2015)
2015	"Heart Shaped Box"	—	—	Single	GoldFish Music (2015)
2018	"It Was You" (with Zeeba)	—	—	Single	GoldFish Music (2 November 2018)

=== Remixes ===
Selected remixes by GoldFish, with date of remix release
Year	Title	Original artist	Release details
2011	"Get Busy Living (Remix)"	GoldFish	GoldFish Music (9 February 2011)
2014	"She Moves (GoldFish Remix)"	Alle Farben	B1 Recordings (2014)
2014	"Divine Sorrow (GoldFish Remix)"	Wyclef Jean and Avicii	Billboard (15 December 2014)
2015	"Feels Like This (GoldFish Remix)"	Lexer	Warner Dance Labels

== See also ==
- List of jazz fusion musicians
- List of trip hop artists
- List of EMI artists
- List of South African musicians
- List of electro house artists
- List of free improvising musicians and groups
