= The Days (Avicii song) =

2014 single by Avicii

Single by Avicii

from the EP The Days / Nights EP
- Released: 3 October 2014
- Recorded: 2014
- Genre: Folktronica; soul; progressive house
- Length: 4:38 (album version); 3:45 (radio edit)
- Label: PRMD; Universal
- Songwriters: Brandon Flowers; Salem Al Fakir; Tim Bergling; Robbie Williams; Vincent Pontare
- Producers: Salem Al Fakir; Avicii; Vincent Pontare

Avicii singles chronology
"Dar um Jeito (We Will Find a Way)" (2014)	"The Days" (2014)	"Divine Sorrow" (2014)

Robbie Williams singles chronology
"Shine My Shoes" (2014)	"The Days" (2014)	"Party Like a Russian" (2016)

Music video
- "The Days" (lyrics video) on YouTube

"The Days" is a song by Swedish DJ and record producer Avicii, with vocals by English singer Robbie Williams. The song was written by Brandon Flowers, Robbie Williams, Salem Al Fakir, Avicii, and Vincent Pontare, and was produced by Avicii, Fakir and Pontare. The song was played for the first time in Las Vegas, with uncredited vocals by Fakir and Pontare. The song was released worldwide on 3 October 2014, alongside another song, "The Nights", on The Days / Nights EP. A planned release in the United Kingdom on 23 November 2014 was cancelled.

== Background and composition ==
"The Days" is written in the key of C major, at a tempo of 127 BPM. The song was originally written with Vincent Pontare and Salem Al Fakir, but was meant to be a collaboration between Brandon Flowers and Avicii, with Flowers providing the vocals. However, due to Flowers' dissatisfaction with the recording, Avicii brought on a different vocalist, English singer Robbie Williams. According to Fuse, "The Days" opens with "acoustic guitar strums before knocking synths get quickly added to the mix. The track moves into a snap-heavy, piano-led pre-chorus section and later goes to a fizzy, glitch-pop dance breakdown." It was released alongside another song, "The Nights", on The Days / Nights EP, on 3 October 2014. According to the Official Charts Company, "The Days" was intended to be the first single from Avicii's second studio album, Stories (2015), however it only ended up being included as a bonus track on the UK, Russian and some international editions of Stories. In June 2015, the original/demo version of "The Days" featuring vocals from Flowers appeared online. In this version, the middle eight features a sample of the 1996 song "Return of the Mack" by British R&B singer Mark Morrison.

== Music video ==
An official lyric video was also released on YouTube by the official Avicii Vevo channel. In the video, an artist (later confirmed as INO), spray-paints the lyrics of "The Days" in black against a white wall. Near the end of the video, a pan-out reveals the lyrics creating a portrait of Avicii, which is subsequently covered with splashes of coloured paint by the artist.

== Track listing ==
Digital download

1. "The Days" - 4:38

CD single

1. "The Days" (Radio Edit) - 3:45
2. "The Days" (Original Mix) - 4:38
3. "The Days" (Extended Mix) - 5:51

== Credits and personnel ==
- Brandon Flowers – lyrics, backing vocals
- Salem Al Fakir – producer
- Tim Bergling – music, producer
- Vincent Pontare – producer
- Robbie Williams – vocals
- Stuart Hawkes – mastering
- Ash Pournouri – executive producer

Credits adapted from CD single.

== Charts ==
=== Weekly charts ===
Weekly chart performance for "The Days"
Chart (2014–2015)	Peak position
Australia (ARIA)	10
Australia Dance (ARIA)	2
Austria (Ö3 Austria Top 40)	3
Belgium (Ultratip Bubbling Under Flanders)	2
Belgium Dance (Ultratop Flanders)	9
Belgium (Ultratip Bubbling Under Wallonia)	2
Belgium Dance (Ultratop Wallonia)	11
Brazil (Billboard Brasil Hot 100)	86
Canada Hot 100 (Billboard)	80
CIS Airplay (TopHit)	155
Czech Republic Airplay (ČNS IFPI)	17
Czech Republic Singles Digital (ČNS IFPI)	1
Denmark (Tracklisten)	4
Finland (Suomen virallinen lista)	5
France (SNEP)	52
Germany (GfK)	7
Hungary (Dance Top 40)	7
Hungary (Rádiós Top 40)	1
Hungary (Single Top 40)	4
Ireland (IRMA)	27
Israel International Airplay (Media Forest)	2
Italy (FIMI)	10
Italy (Musica e dischi)	17
Japan Hot 100 (Billboard)	22
Mexico Anglo (Monitor Latino)	20
Netherlands (Dutch Top 40)	10
Netherlands (Single Top 100)	16
New Zealand (Recorded Music NZ)	28
Norway (VG-lista)	2
Poland Dance (ZPAV)	15
Slovakia Airplay (ČNS IFPI)	17
Slovakia Singles Digital (ČNS IFPI)	2
Slovenia (SloTop50)	5
South Africa Airplay (EMA)	8
South Korea International Chart (Gaon)	38
Spain (Promusicae)	26
Sweden (Sverigetopplistan)	1
Switzerland (Schweizer Hitparade)	8
UK Singles (Official Charts Company)	82
US Billboard Hot 100	78
US Hot Dance/Electronic Songs (Billboard)	8

=== Year-end charts ===
2014 annual chart rankings for "The Days"
Chart (2014)	Position
Germany (Official German Charts)	88
Hungary (Rádiós Top 40)	48
Hungary (Single Top 40)	43
Italy (FIMI)	100
Japan Adult Contemporary (Billboard)	55
Netherlands (Dutch Top 40)	56
Netherlands (Single Top 100)	74
Sweden (Sverigetopplistan)	44
US Hot Dance/Electronic Songs (Billboard)	55

2015 annual chart rankings for "The Days"
Chart (2015)	Position
Hungary (Dance Top 40)	36
Hungary (Rádiós Top 40)	83
Hungary (Single Top 40)	84
Slovenia (SloTop50)	25
US Hot Dance/Electronic Songs (Billboard)	56

== Certifications ==
Region	Certification	Certified units/sales
Australia (ARIA)	2× Platinum	140,000^{‡}
Brazil (Pro-Música Brasil)	2× Platinum	120,000^{‡}
Denmark (IFPI Danmark)	Platinum	60,000^{^}
Germany (BVMI)	Gold	200,000^{‡}
Italy (FIMI)	Platinum	30,000^{‡}
New Zealand (RMNZ)	Gold	7,500^{*}
Spain (Promusicae)	Gold	20,000^{‡}
Sweden (GLF)	Platinum	40,000^{‡}
United Kingdom (BPI)	Silver	200,000^{‡}
Streaming
Denmark (IFPI Danmark)	Gold	1,300,000^{†}
Spain (Promusicae)	Gold	4,000,000^{†}
^{*} Sales figures based on certification alone.^{^} Shipments figures based on certification alone.^{‡} Sales+streaming figures based on certification alone.^{†} Streaming-only figures based on certification alone.
