= Mr. Paradox Paradise =

European urban artist

Paradox Paradise Berlin Kidz
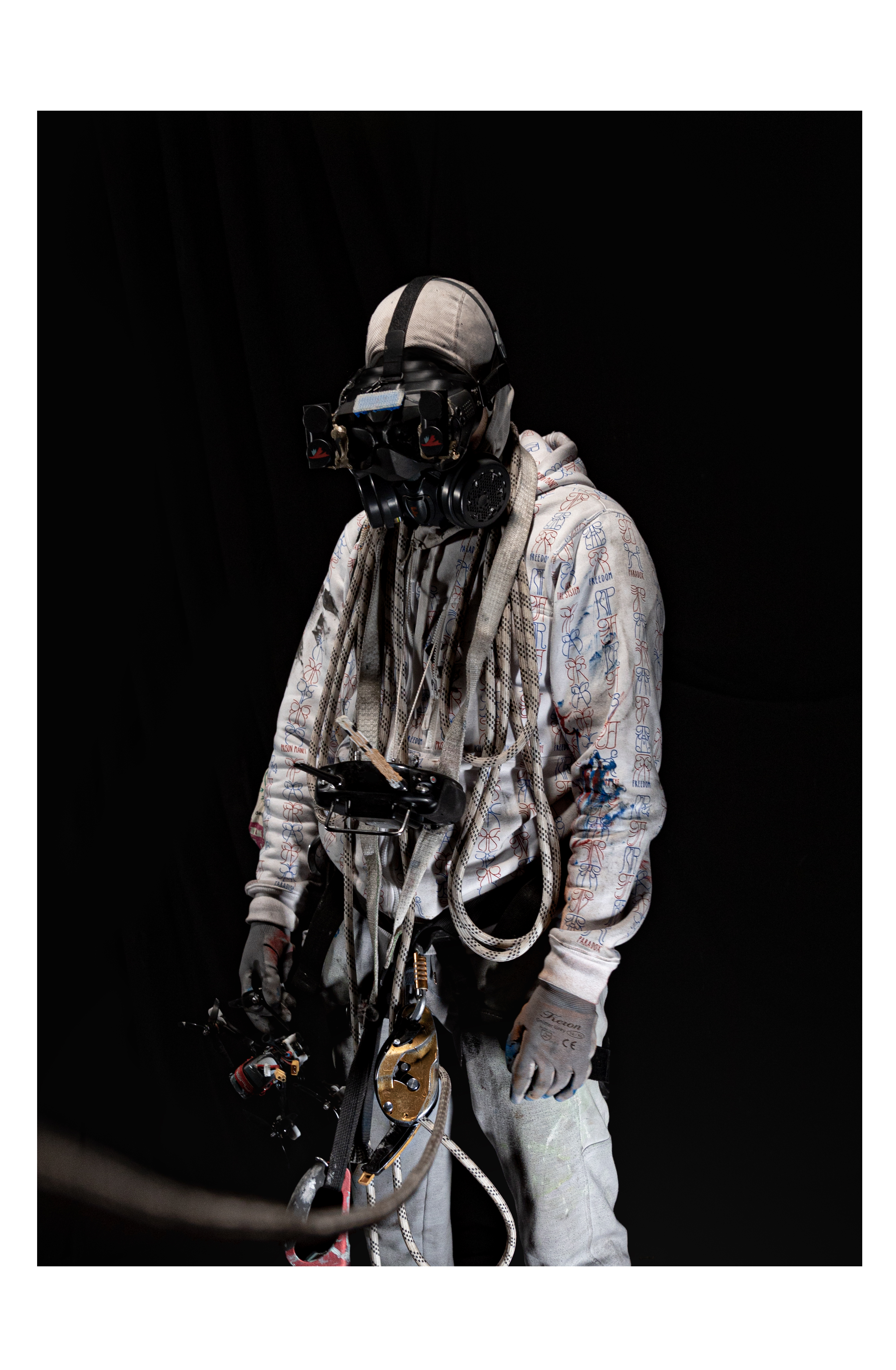
- Paradox Paradise with abseiling and drone equipment, 2023
- Born: Berlin, Germany
- Education: Self-taught
- Years active: 2009–present
- Known for: Graffiti, urban exploration, filmmaking; Berlin Kidz
- Notable work: ‘‘Berlin Kidz 1’’ (2013), ‘‘Berlin Kidz 2’’ (2017), ‘‘Spiritual Letters’’ (2021)
- Style: Vertical rope graffiti, tagging, lettering, rappelling
- Movement: Street art, urban art
- Website: mrparadoxparadise.de

Paradox Paradise (also: Paradox) is a European artist and filmmaker. He became known for large-scale vertical rope graffiti in Berlin’s public space (Heaven Spots) and for rappelling actions on high-rise buildings. His artworks convey spiritual and system-critical messages that often address social or political issues. Paradox maintains strict anonymity, an essential element of his artistic identity.

== Style and practice ==
Paradox paints vertical letterforms he calls “Paraglyphs”, created while rappelling down buildings, towers and even wind turbines. The style combines geometric and organic shapes with letterforms. Developed over several years, Paraglyphs evolved from hand-drawn sketches into a new style and composition. His characteristic colors are red and blue, often spelling words such as “Freedom” and “Peace”.

Since the early 2010s Paradox has been noted for systematically combining graffiti with film. Using drones and handheld cameras, he documented his actions and disseminated them via YouTube and independent film screenings, making him one of the first Berlin graffiti artists to merge street writing with cinematic production.

== Works ==
In 2016 he gained attention with the action “How did the bicycle get on the Molecule Man?”, when a bicycle was placed on the sculpture in Berlin’s Spree river.

In 2020, he painted the front of the 98-metre-high former Berlin West Postcheckamt (postal cheque office) in West Berlin. He had previously sprayed graffiti on this building and was sued for it by the former owner, the CG Group. The wall was blackened and the tower sold. Two years later, the artist was given legal permission to redesign the façade of the building, under heavy police presence and in front of a crowd of onlookers.

During preparations for the exhibition ‘Talking... And Other Banana Skins’ in 2022, Paradox created ONE WALL in Berlin, near the Urban Nation Museum. It refers to his work exhibited in the museum. Upon closer inspection, the letters combine to form the word ‘FREIHEIT’ (freedom).

== Sculptures ==
Since 2020, Paradox has been installing street art sculptures in public spaces, carefully adapted to the surrounding architecture. He also creates 3D Laser artworks, which are exhibited in museums and galleries. To prevent theft, he installs them in hard-to-reach locations using ropes and equips them with GPS trackers.

== Filmography ==
Paradox Paradise is known for its self-produced documentaries, which document graffiti actions with ropes, abseiling from buildings and urban explorations.

- Berlin Kidz – 100% Pure Adrenaline (2013), a documentary about graffiti actions, parkour and train surfing in Berlin
- Berlin Kidz 2 (2017), a documentary on urban art actions, premiered at Kino Babylon, Berlin
- Spiritual Letters (2021), a documentary exploring the relationship between art, life and spirituality, premiered at Kino Babylon, Berlin

== Selected exhibitions ==
- 2021: Golden Hands Gallery, Hamburg.
- 2021: Urban Films Festival at Urban Art Fair, Paris (France).
- 2021: HK Walls annual street art festival, Hong Kong (China). Group exhibition.
- 2022 – 2024: Talking … & Other Banana Skins, Urban Nation Museum, Berlin.
- 2022: Paraglyphs, Galerie Grolman, Berlin. Solo Exhibition.
- 2024 – 2027: Love Letters to the City, Urban Nation Museum for Urban Contemporary Art, Berlin. Group exhibition along Banksy, Shepard Fairey, Vhils, JR, Blek le Rat, Martha Cooper and others.
- 2026: The spray can 100 years, Norwegian Museum of Science and Technology. Group exhibition Streetart Oslo.

== Reception ==
The European culture channel Arte portrayed Paradox in its Tracks program, describing him as “one of the most notorious phantoms of the European street art scene”. The magazine Lodown referred to him as “an enigmatic and ever elusive Berlin graffiti writer”. His 2021 documentary Spiritual Letters explores the intersection of art, urban space, and spirituality, earning an 8.0 rating on IMDb and praise for its intimate portrayal of Berlin's graffiti scene. Academic research has identified Mr. Paradox Paradise as a key contemporary figure in the analysis of identity formation within the graffiti subculture. His extreme vertical interventions and the deliberate creation of a masked, risk-taking persona are considered a paradigmatic example of how graffiti can function today as an instrument of personal and political self-assertion in urban space. Sociological analyses, such as a 2024 study in the Italian Sociological Review, highlight his works alongside those of blu (artist) and Cranio as pivotal in redefining the socio-political role of street art in urban environments. In 2026, the German art magazine Monopol described the works of Paradox Paradise as a connection between architecture and typography in urban space".

Gallery
Street art sculpture "Guardian" by Paradox Paradise in Kreuzberg, Berlin 2026

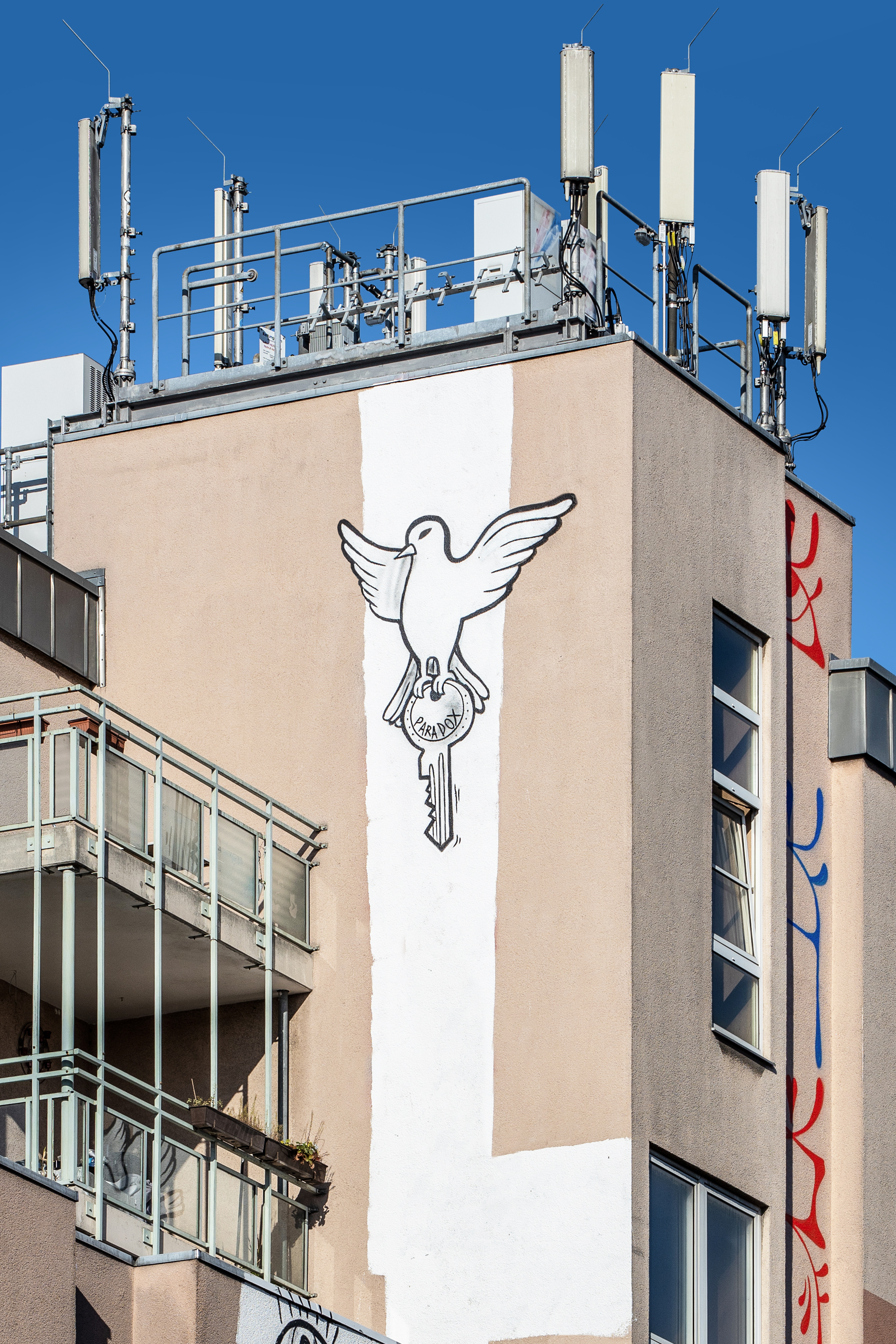
Mural on Schönleinstraße, Kreuzberg, Berlin 2021

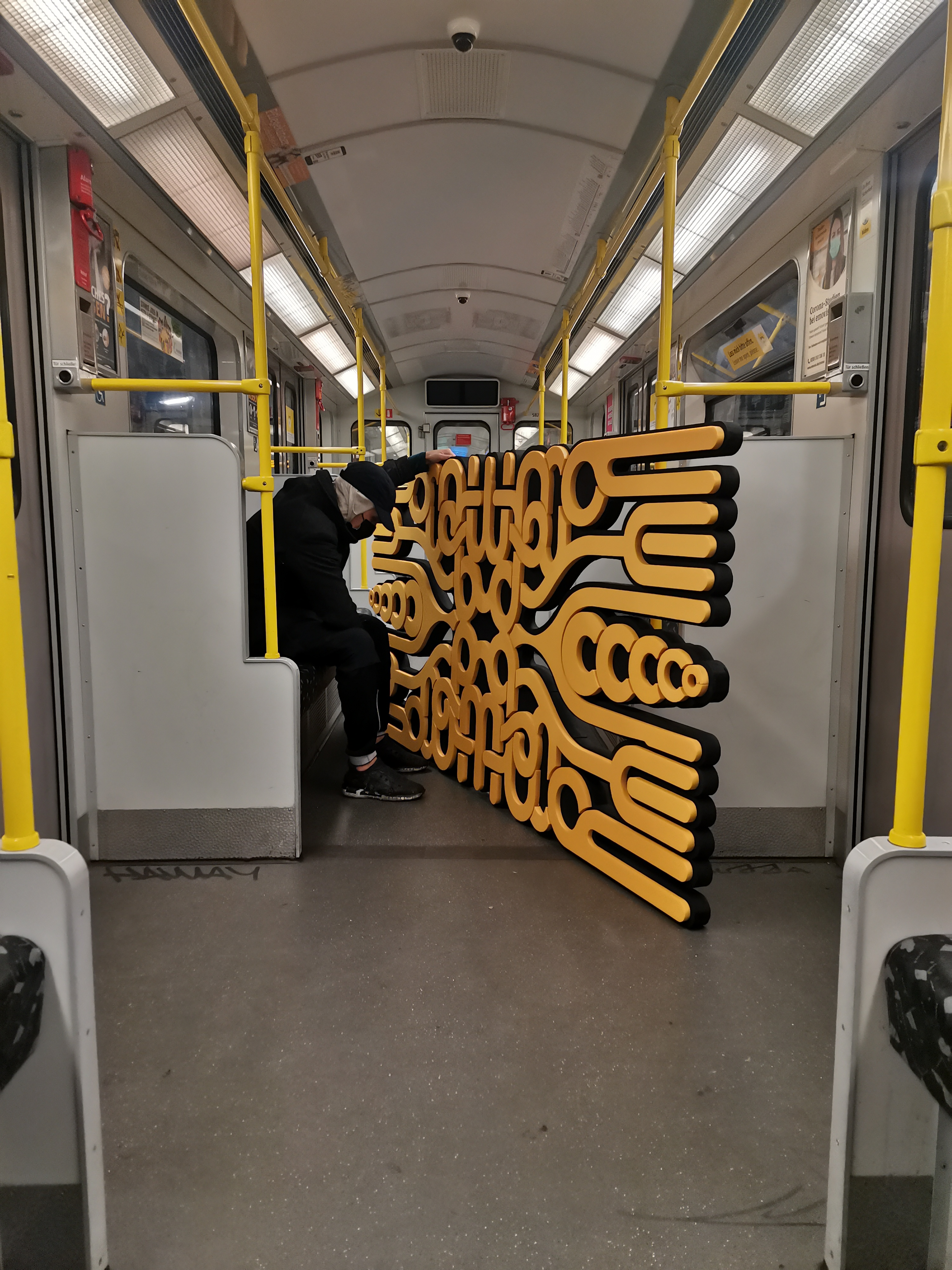
Paradox transporting a Spiritual Letter on the U-Bahn, Berlin 2021

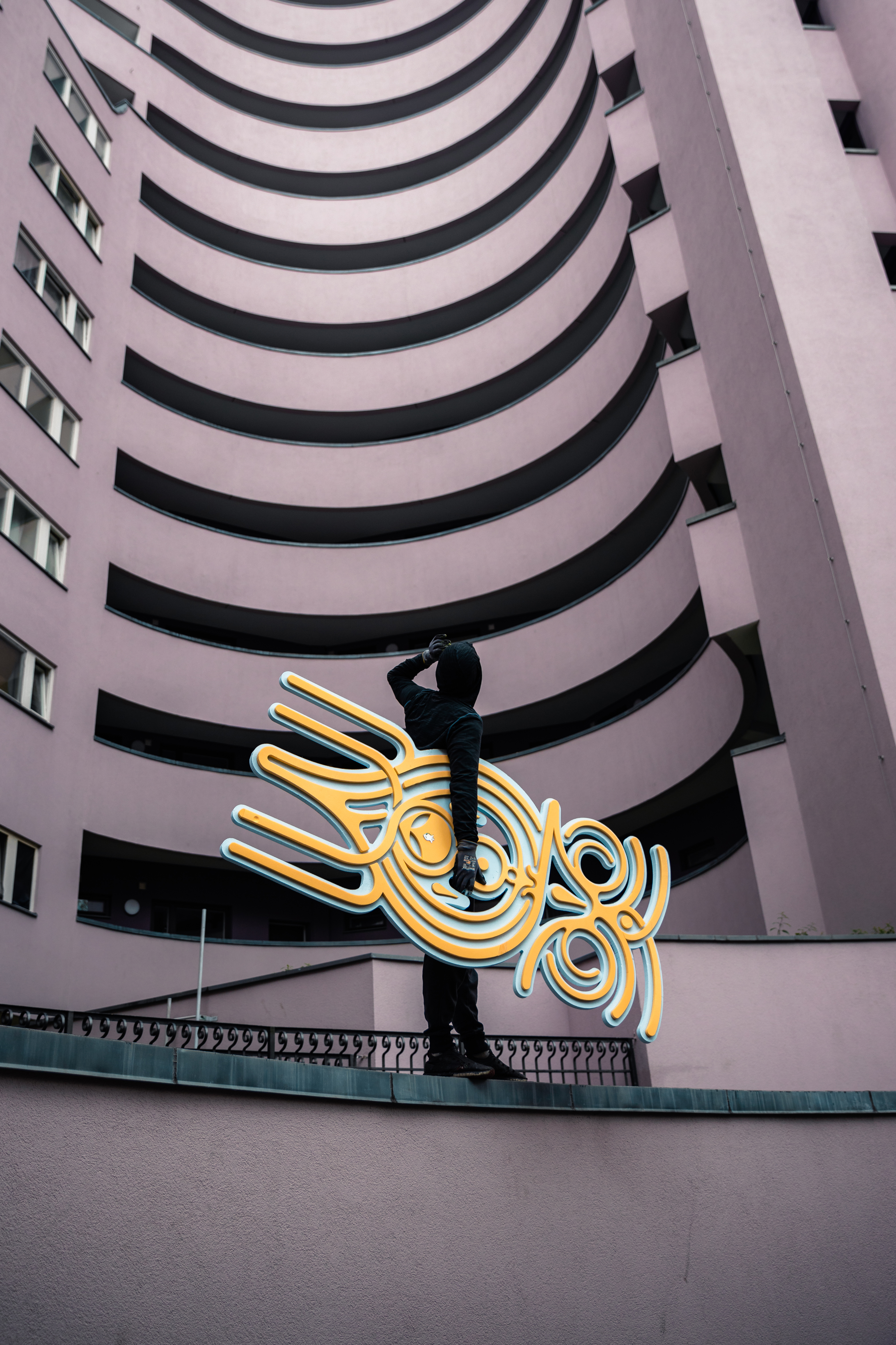
Paradox Paradise, Berlin 2023

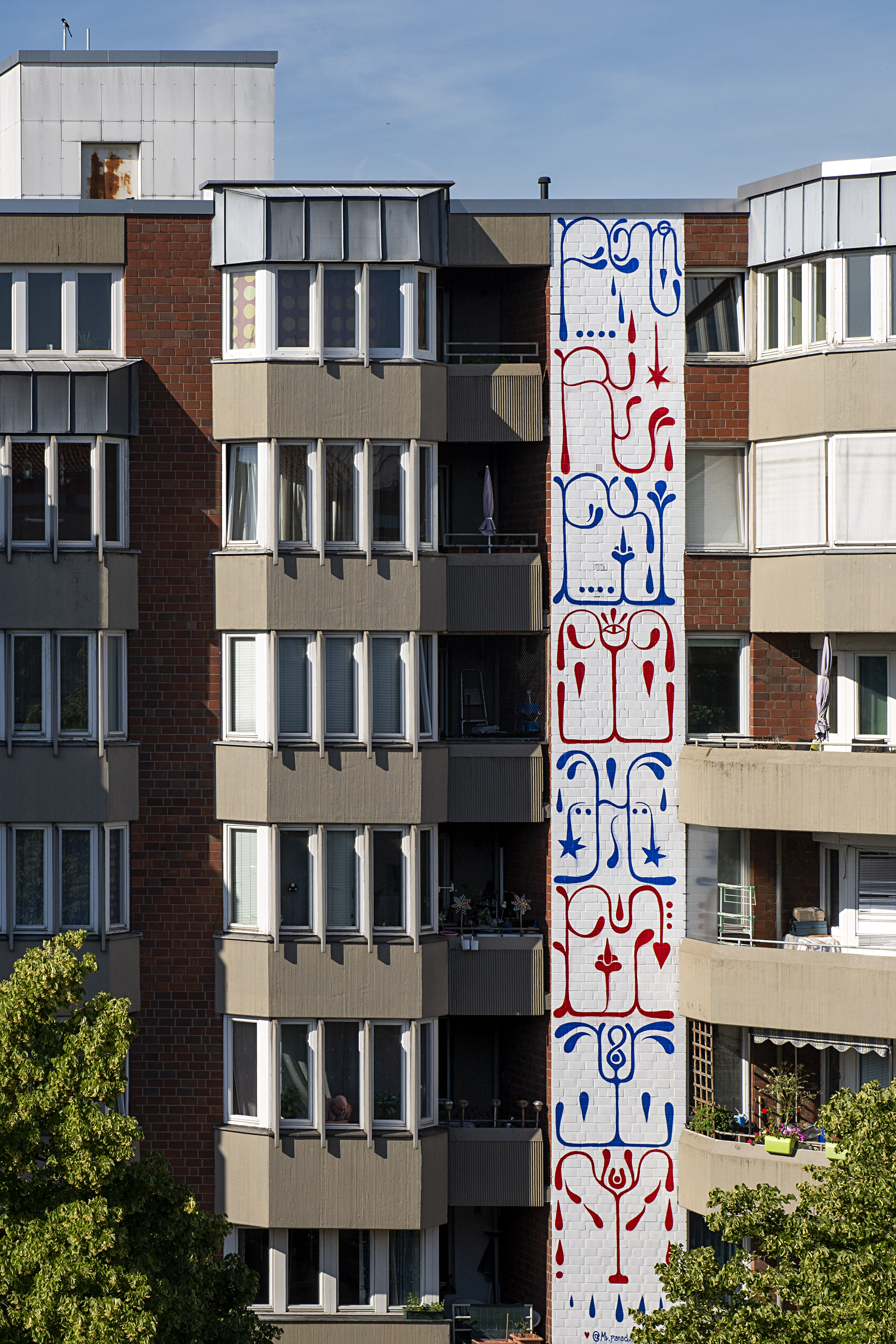
"FREEDOM" by Paradox for the One Wall Festival 2022

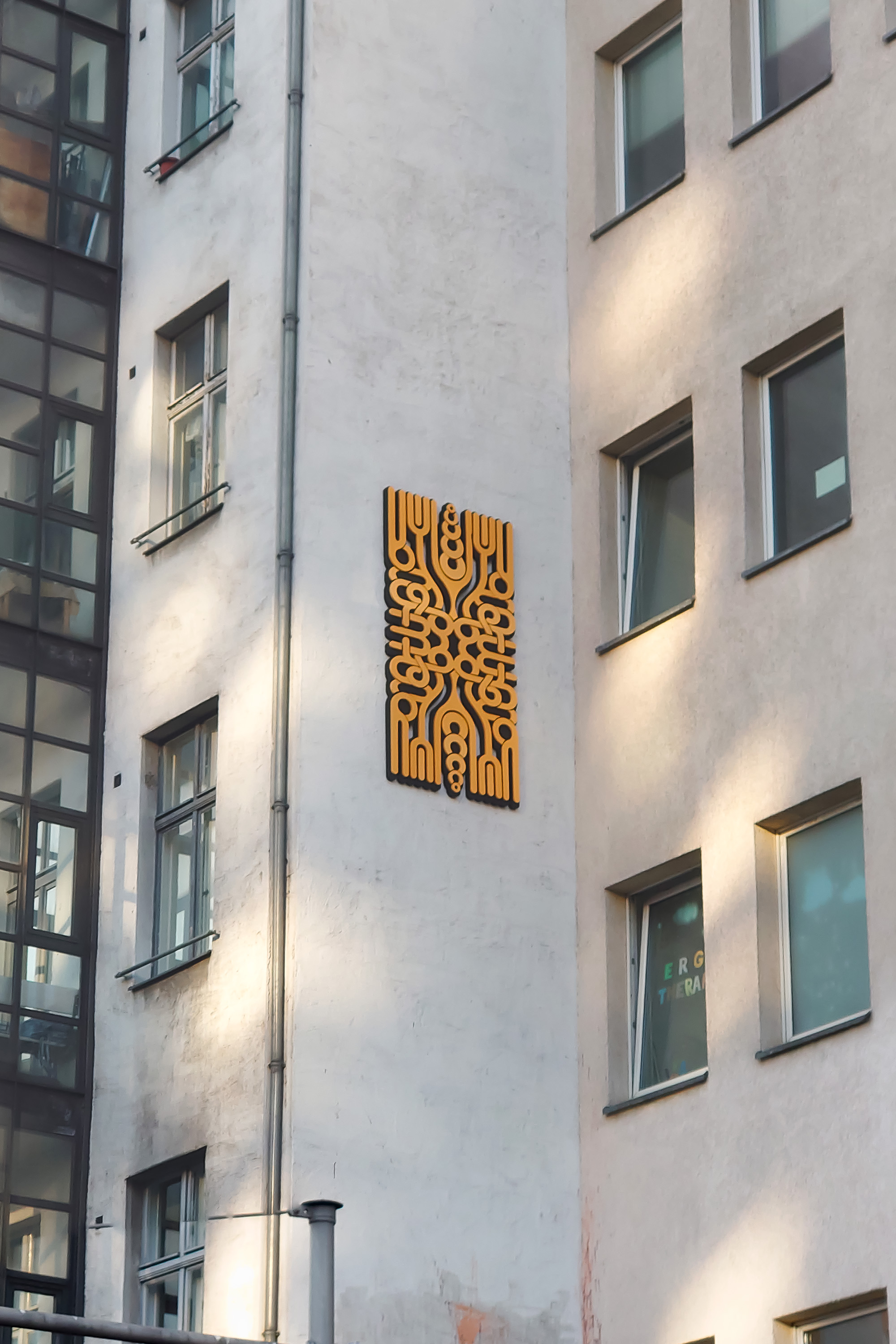
Kottbusser Tor, Berlin 2022 (Paraglyph)

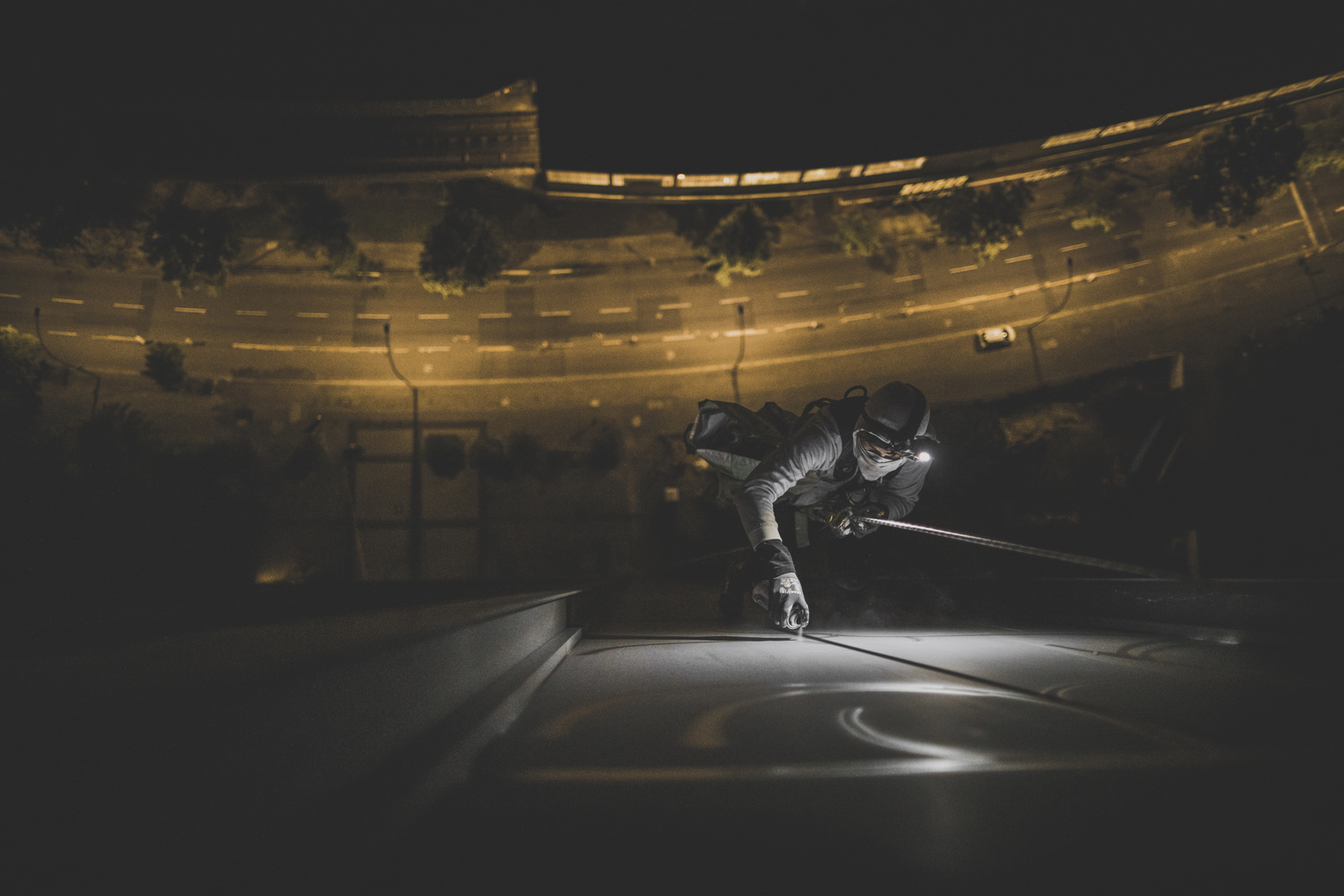
Vertical rope graffiti, Berlin 2022

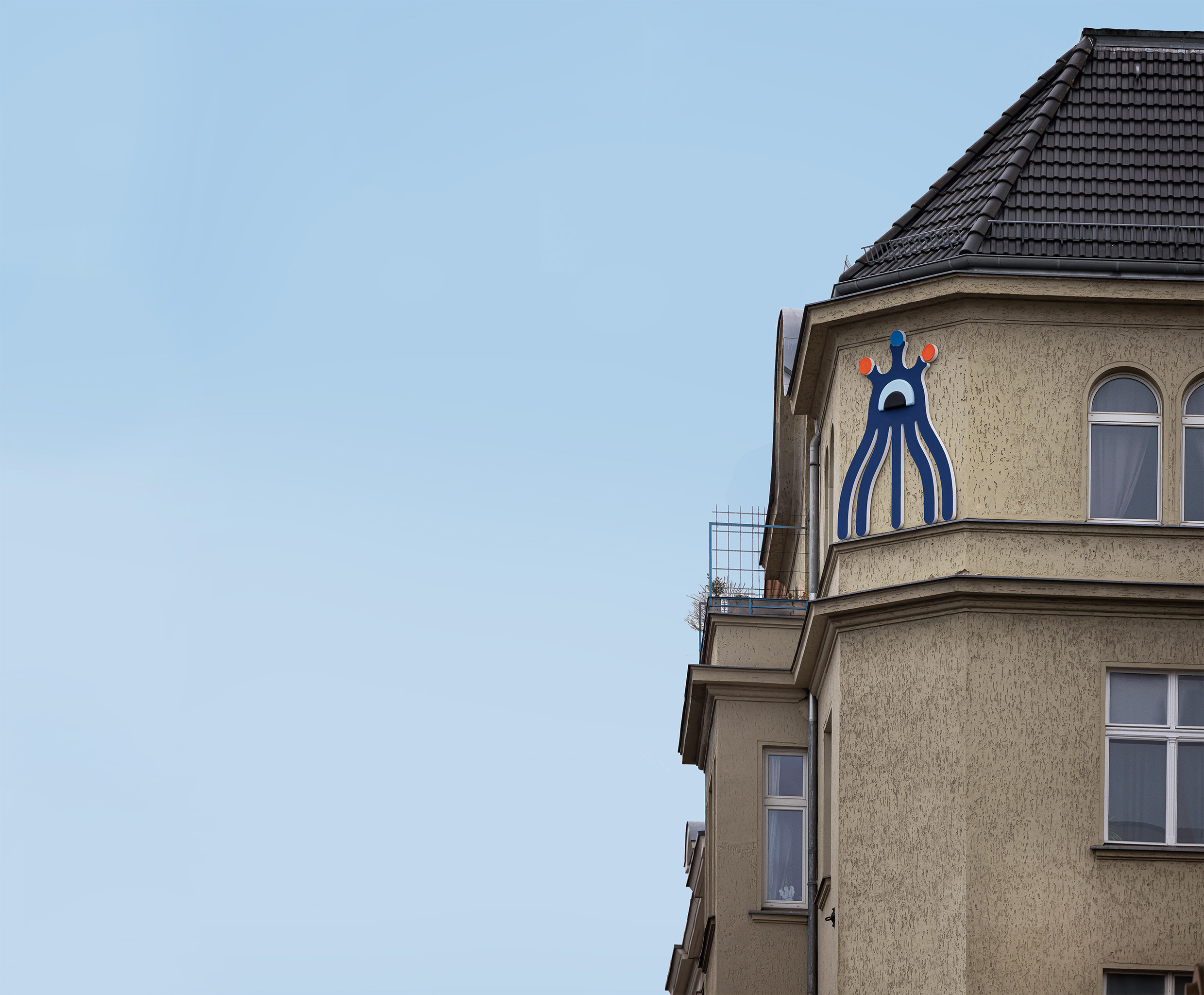
Paradox Jellyfish sculpture on Bülowstraße, Berlin

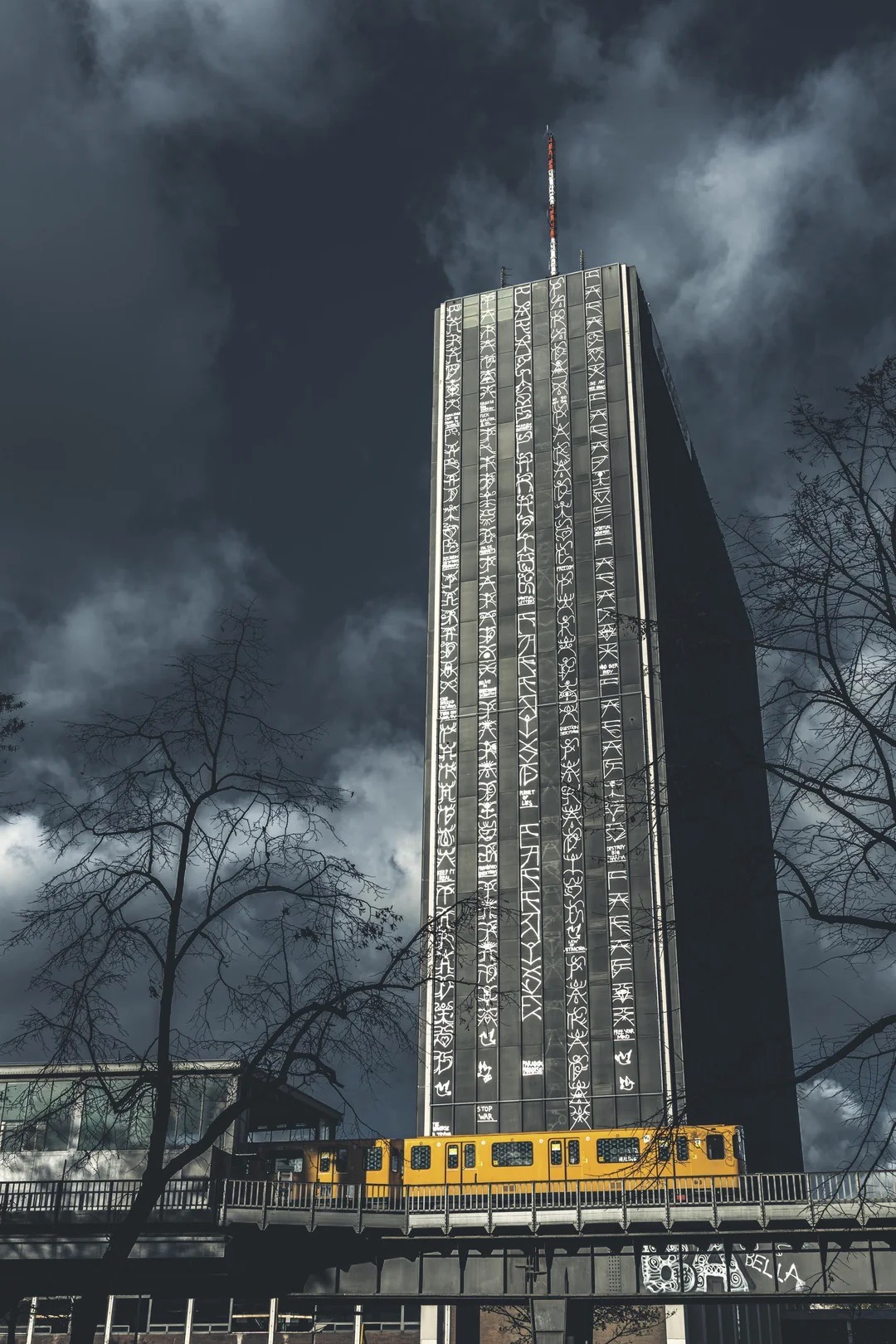
Mr. Paradox Paradise at the Berlin West Postcheckamt 2020

== Publications ==
- PARADOX — CPT.OLF 16-19 (2019) – ISBN 978-3-981-79437-3
- Paradox.Paradise (2022) – ISBN 978-3-981-79443-4
- Striker (2025) – ISBN 978-3-462-06207-6 Novel by Helene Hegemann (Kiepenheuer & Witsch), which features the graffiti artist “Striker” inspired by Mr. Paradox Paradise.
