= Caught in the Loop =

Studio album by Goldfish
- Released: 29 May 2006
- Recorded: 2006
- Genre: Electronic
- Length: 65:09
- Label: Black Mango Music, Goldfish Music
- Producer: Goldfish

Goldfish chronology
Caught in the Loop (2006)	Perceptions of Pacha (2008)

Professional ratings
Review scores
Source	Rating
Channel24.com	4/5 stars

Caught in the Loop is the first album from the South African musical group Goldfish. It was released in 2006 by Black Mango Music in South Africa.

== Track listing ==
No.	Title	Length
1.	"The Real Deal"	4:49
2.	"Times May Change You"	4:30
3.	"Love and Hate"	4:02
4.	"Mbira Beat"	5:02
5.	"All Night"	3:45
6.	"Egyptology"	4:48
7.	"Wait a Minute"	5:23
8.	"The Four Forty Five Blues"	4:35
9.	"Last Tango in Paradise"	4:00
10.	"Dream"	4:16
11.	"Obey"	3:32
12.	"From Zanzibar with Love"	5:10
13.	"Highfalutin"	4:25
14.	"The Real Deal (Radio Edit)"	3:29
15.	"All Night (Radio Edit)"	3:16
Total length:		65:02
