= Perceptions of Pacha =

Studio album by Goldfish
- Released: August 29, 2008
- Recorded: 2007–2008
- Studio: Goldfish Studios
- Label: Sony Music Entertainment Africa

Goldfish chronology
Caught in the Loop (2006)	Perceptions of Pacha (2008)	Perceptions of Pacha Remixed (2009)

Perceptions of Pacha is a studio album by the South African musical group Goldfish, released on August 29, 2008. With the album, the group set a new South African Music Awards record for most nominations in 2009, with eight nominations including Best Duo or Group and Album of the Year, winning Best Engineer and Best Dance Album for Perceptions of Pacha.

== Track listing ==
No.	Title	Writer(s)	Length
1.	"Sold My Soul" (feat. Max Vidima)	David Poole, Dominic Peters, Max Vidima	3:51
2.	"This Is How It Goes" (feat. Monique Hellenberg)	D. Poole, D. Peters	7:05
3.	"Fort Knox" (feat. Sakhile Moleshe)	D. Poole, D. Peters	3:18
4.	"Hold Tight" (feat. Hlulani Hlangwani)	D. Poole, D. Peters	6:32
5.	"Wet Welly"	D. Poole, D. Peters	4:10
6.	"Cruising Through" (feat. Zakhile Moleshe)	D. Poole, D. Peters	4:17
7.	"Just For Tonight"	D. Poole, D. Peters	3:16
8.	"Soundtracks And Come Backs"	D. Poole, D. Peters	5:21
9.	"Are You Lulu" (feat. Max Vidima)	D. Poole, D. Peters, Max Vidima	8:55
10.	"Coming Home" (feat. Hlulani Hlangwani)	D. Poole, D. Peters	6:08
11.	"This Is How It Goes (Radio Edit)" (feat. Monique Hellenberg)	D. Poole, D. Peters	3:31
12.	"Cruising Through (Radio Edit)" (feat. Zakhile Moleshe)	D. Poole, D. Peters	3:32

== Awards and nominations ==
Award	Nominated work	Category	Result
15th South African; Music Awards of 2009	Goldfish for Perceptions of Pacha	Best Engineer	Won
15th South African; Music Awards of 2009	Perceptions of Pacha	Best Dance Album	Won
15th South African; Music Awards of 2009	Perceptions of Pacha	Album of the Year	Nominated
15th South African; Music Awards of 2009	Goldfish for Perceptions of Pacha	Best Duo or Group	Nominated
15th South African; Music Awards of 2009	Goldfish (Peters and Poole) for Perceptions of Pacha	Best Producer	Nominated

== Personnel ==
- Goldfish - primary artist
- Dominic Peters - writer, engineer, keyboards, double bass, bass guitar, programming
- David Poole - writer, engineer, vocals, saxophone, flute, programming
