= INO (artist) =

Greek visual artist

- Born: Greece
- Education: Athens School of Fine Arts
- Movement: Public Art, Surrealism, Figurative art, Graffiti, Street Art, Mural
- Website: www.ino.net

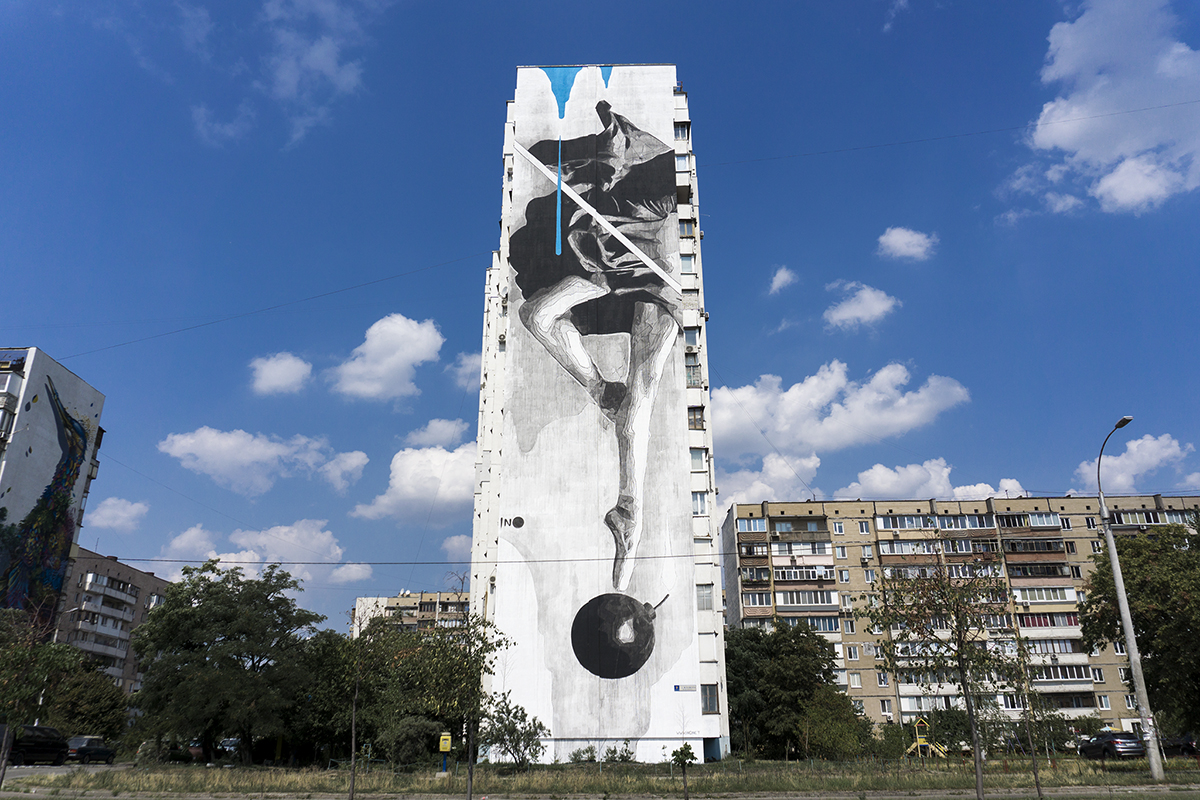
Instability (2016) in Kyiv, Ukraine

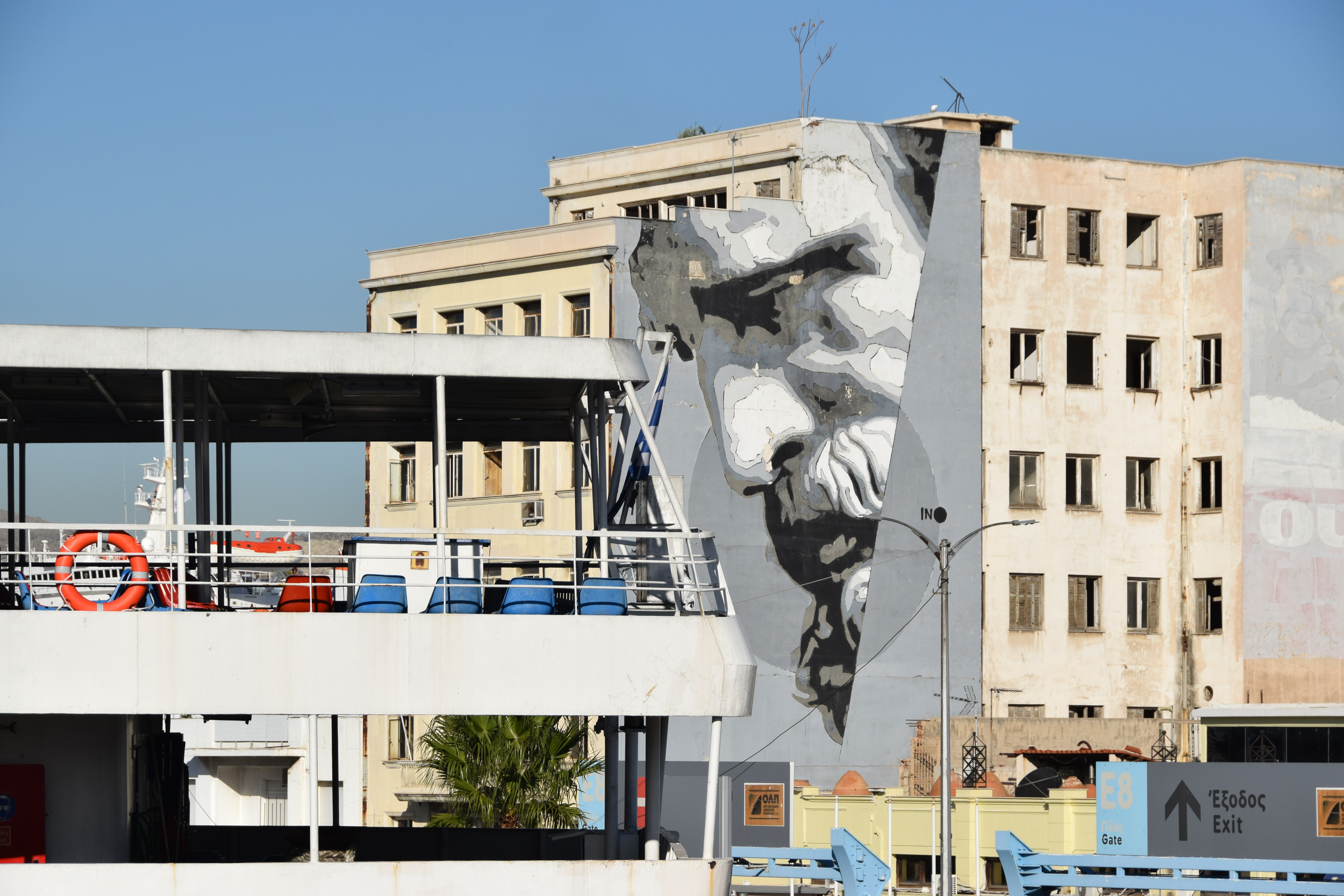
We Have the Power (2015) at Port of Piraeus, Athens

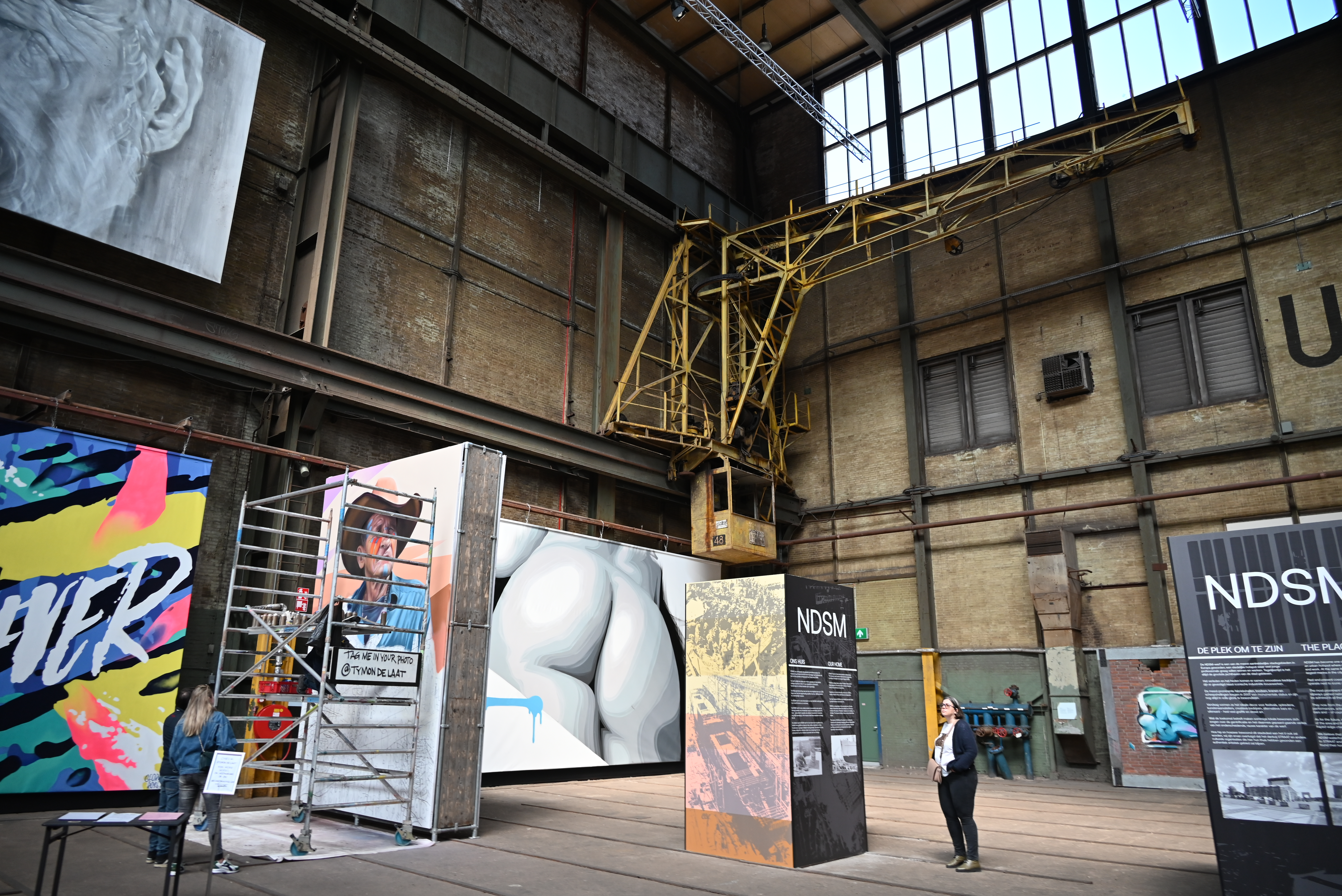
Available 4 Rent (2018) at STRAAT Museum in Amsterdam

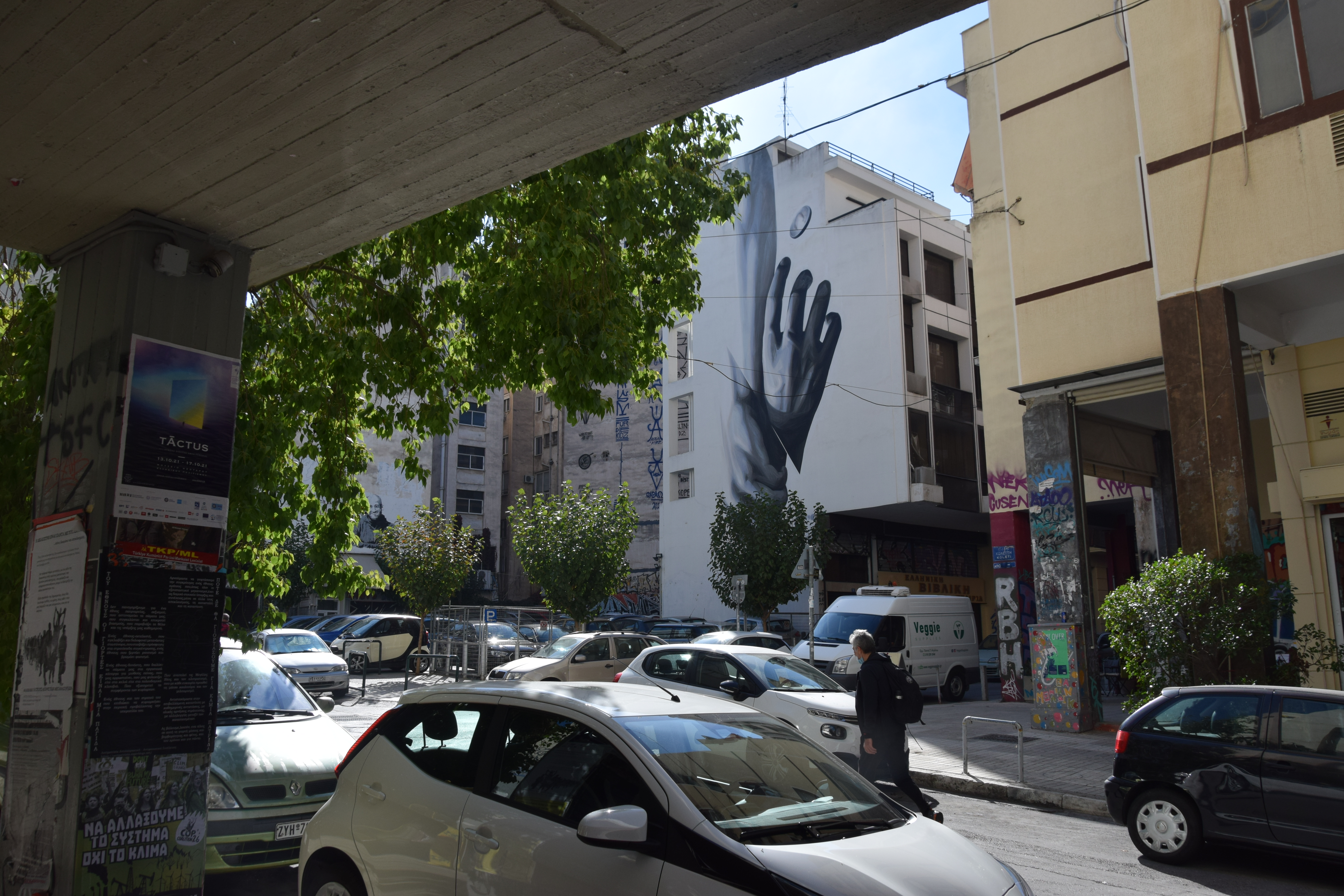
Wake Up (2014) in Exarcheia, Athens, Greece

Free as We are (2025) in São Paulo, SP, Brazil

INO is a visual artist from Greece who studied painting at the Athens School of Fine Arts and is worldwide known for his large scale murals.

== Early life ==
Like several other muralists and graffiti artists, such as Banksy, STIK, and Felipe Pantone, INO keeps his identity private and works under a pseudonym so the focus remains on his work and its messages. In his youth, he painted in public spaces without explicit permission, but now his murals are sought after. In an early interview, he recounted how he was chased away from painting at one spot, and later paid to create a mural at the very same location.

It is consistently reported that he studied painting at the Athens School of Fine Arts, but one scholar reported that INO studied at the National Technical University of Athens. which may have been an error arising from the fact that the two schools were linked for decades and have a shared history. In addition to painting he also studied photography, typography, multimedia, and graphic design.

INO is from Piraeus, a port city in the greater Athens area of Greece. His work from the early 2000s were mostly in Greece, and were critiques intended for the Greek people during a time when the country was struggling to recover from the Greek government-debt crisis. Around that time, the Athens School of Fine Arts gave classes in street painting, which gave rise to many new murals in Athens. The local government began issuing permits for commissioned murals to transform areas into outdoor galleries, and to counteract more illicit graffiti works. INO created commissioned works, but with social messages.

INO coined the term "brandalism" but his name does not display on the list of artists officially associated with the brandalism collective.

== Style and technique ==
Especially notable in his early professional work, INO drew inspiration from much older paintings and narratives (such as Greek mythology or ancient historical events or classical ideals) and provided the new compositions in a more accessible public space. For example, System of a Fraud (2013) in the Metaxourgeio neighborhood of Athens depicts the face of Solon as he has been presented in carved busts.

In interviews, INO identified M. C. Escher, Jenny Saville, and Antoni Gaudí as artists who influence his work, and these influences are more apparent as his career has progressed. Now that he works internationally, the messages of his work reflect the area in which they are located. As he explained, "If you want to learn about a city, look at its walls."

=== The INO blue ===
Since at least 2015, most of his works have had a distinctive style: photorealistic elements, gray tones, and a light blue spot color. INO identified his light blue color as a favorite color, saying, "I use the grayscale with its inherent contradictions and after, some light blue to calm things a bit, give an extra tone." The spot color serves to draw the eye to key points, and it is found in most of his murals since 2015. For example:

- Ignorance is Bliss (2015) in Cyprus's parliament building depicts Solon and Pericles as they were commonly shown in Classical carved busts, with swaths of blue painted over their eyes.
- Snow-blind (2016) in Athens was commissioned as part of a public information campaign about hepatitis C; the grayscale mural of a man has a splash of blue in the shape of his liver.
- With Untitled (2016) in the Fenway neighborhood of Boston, INO added a mural to an area that had been recently heavily filled with graffiti. The mural showed a gloved hand holding a can of spray paint, and the glove was blue. Of the piece, he said, "The game never changes, only the people."

=== Removal of controversial murals ===
Although commissioned work is planned and approved in advance, a few times public reaction has caused a removal.

- Man With No Name (2015) in Minsk was commissioned by Belarus's Ministry of Culture as part of their "Urban Myths" project. It is a photorealistic gray image of a hooded person. The face is in shadow, hidden behind the yellow flame of a candle. INO said of the mural, "It is dedicated to all those who were executed and after some time, it was proved that they were innocent." After three years of debate for and against the mural, it removed.
- NO FEAR of Power (Funk the Power) (2016) in Ibiza was created for the BLOOP International Proactive Art Festival's "No Fear" theme. The mural had a large hand pointing down to a smaller hand, which had its middle finger up. The INO blue splashed down to draw the eye to the smaller hand. The mural was on the wall of a middle school, and so despite its popularity the local council voted to have it removed after the festival.
- Capital Control (2016) was commissioned as part of Art (Re)Public, a project that included 12 murals to revive downtown Jacksonville, Florida, as an arts and entertainment district. INO's mural was painted on the side of the Regions Bank building; it depicted a CCTV surveillance camera in gray tones, with the INO blue gushing a stream out of the camera lens. Although the bank and project organizers had approved of the mural's design in advance, after it was completed the bank decided that the reality of surveillance would frighten their customers, and they removed it within a week.

== Grassroots street art ==
Early in his career, INO created street art intended to provoke conversation about the economic crisis, often featuring photorealistic forms and surrealist themes including eyes, gas masks, and the female form.

- Lost (2018, Piraeus, Athens): depicts a woman with a swirl of blue around her head
- Apocalypse Now (2021, Psyri, Athens): depicts a person wearing a balaclava, watching the people at the intersection of two streets
- System of a Fraud (2013, Metaxourgeio, Athens): depicts the face of Solon
- Clockwork (2013, Gazi, Athens): depicts a man with empty eyes and a winding key in his temple

== Curated artwork ==
=== Gallery exhibitions ===
INO has selectively exhibited canvas and studio work in prominent gallery and museum shows.

- Dreaming of Greece (2026, New York City): two-week exhibition curated by Moments Gallery, bringing together twelve Greek artists; featured INO's work
- Wernice Venezia 2024 (2024, Venice): group exhibition organized concurrently with Venice Biennale 2024, explored how post-graffiti and street subcultures transitioned into premium gallery spaces; each artist was invited to create one artwork on canvas, with INO contributing Post Vandalism.
- UN-DERSTAND: The Power of Art as a Social Architect (2018, URBAN NATION Museum for Urban Contemporary Art, Berlin): museum exhibition highlighting street artists as social architects; featured INO's work
- Greek Contemporary Art Exhibition (2016, Katara Cultural Village, Doha): state-level cultural exchange exhibition; INO presented the acrylic-on-plywood installation Freedom Diptych

=== Permanent collections ===
- Available 4 Rent (2018): a large-scale canvas painting held at the STRAAT Museum in Amsterdam
- Fuck Street Art (2017): Canvas painting created for the grand opening of the URBAN NATION Museum for Urban Contemporary Art in Berlin

=== Public murals and commissions ===
INO has created large site-specific works in collaboration with cultural foundations, municipal campaigns, and government bodies.

- Fly Away (2026, Houston): created for the Harris County Cultural Initiative through Street Art for Mankind; celebrates Houston's aerospace heritage and humanity's push for progress
- United by Nature (2025, Seattle): created with Street Art for Mankind for the FIFA World Cup 2026; celebrates the city's commitment to human rights
- Natural Destruction (2021, Solnechnodolsk): Created as part of the Urban Morphogenesis project, the mural depicts a faceless man in a suit, with a splash of blue at his upper-left chest
- Leonardo da Vinci: 500 Years of Genius installation (2019, Old Depot OSY, Gazi, Athens): 90-meter-long commission for a historical and scientific retrospective, it is divided into four sections: Leonardo, Mona Lisa, Vitruvian Man, and The Last Supper.
- Releasement (2017, Abu Dhabi): commissioned mural on the side of the Park Inn Hotel at Yas Island, it shows a male hand releasing female butterflies
- Capital Control (2016, Jacksonville): commissioned as part of the Art (Re)Public project and removed by the building owner
- Instability and The Entrepreneur (2016, Kyiv): two murals contributed to Art United Us, an international public art exhibition raising awareness of war
- Officially Nobody (2016, Reykjavík): created for the Wall Poetry exhibition, co-curated by Iceland Airwaves and URBAN NATION, paired with Icelandic band Samaris
- Ignorance is Bliss (2016, Nicosia): commissioned by the Parliament of Cyprus to span the facade of the national Parliament building; a commentary on corrupt political structures
- Snow-blind (2016, Athens): commissioned by the Prometheus Liver Patient Association to raise public awareness of hepatitis C; depicts a faceless figure with his liver marked in INO's signature blue
- Creasing (2014, Athens): commissioned by the Onassis Cultural Center to wrap the Onassis Stegi building for the "No Respect" exhibition; depicted a crumpled paper with a face emerging around a building corner

=== Festivals ===
INO has contributed works to international street art festivals.

- Free As We Are (Livres como somos) (2026, NaLata Festival, Pinheiros, Sao Paulo): about the freedom of expression
- Bleeding Heart (2024, Kutaisi Mural Fest, Kutaisi): mural of Jason from the play Medea
- The Art of Making Money (2024, Calle Libre Festival, Vienna): painted on a building at the Vienna University of Economics and Business; explores societal value
- Outlaw (2024, Just Paint festival, Quéven): In a commentary about technology and surveillance, it depicts a man wearing a hoodie and gas mask, with a drone flying in his face
- Hopeless (2018, BLOOP International Proactive Art Festival, Ibiza): depicts a girl praying for money
- Braindead (2018, Millerntor Gallery international festival, Hamburg): painted on the wall of the Millerntor-Stadion arena
- Broken (2017, Festival Concreto, Fortaleza): commentary on the wealth gap and exploitation of local sex workers
- Photobombing (2017, UPNORTH Festival, Røst Municipality): about the increasing lack of privacy in the modern age
- In Search of Sunrise and NO FEAR of Power (Funk the Power) (2016, BLOOP International Proactive Art Festival, Ibiza): two works INO contributed to the 2016 edition of the festival
- Man With No Name (2015, Urban Myths Festival, Minsk): controversial piece later removed
- In Heaven With You (2013, Art Basel Miami Beach, Wynwood Art District, Miami): depicts a man's face with a coin inserted in his forehead

== Brand collaborations and commercial work ==
INO has created works for commercial clients ranging from global brands to music and nightlife.

- Spasiba (2021, Athens): created for Converse's global "Converse City Forests" campaign around the theme of "Breaking Barriers"; the mural depicts a girl with a sledgehammer.
- Untitled (2016, Manhattan): mural created inside the offices of FCB (advertising agency)
- We Have The Power (2015, Piraeus): commissioned by National Geographic for Episode 2 of the documentary The Greeks; depicts a child looking up at the philosopher Democritus
- Untitled (2015, Greece): mural created inside the offices of The Coca-Cola Company's Central & Southern Europe division
- United by Nature collaboration (2014, Sweden): INO painted the mural as a performance during the filming of DJ Avicii's music video for "The Days", and designed custom backdrops and promotional artwork
- Untitled (2014, STORY Nightclub, Miami): mural created during Art Basel Miami Beach
