= 1UP (graffiti crew) =

German graffiti crew

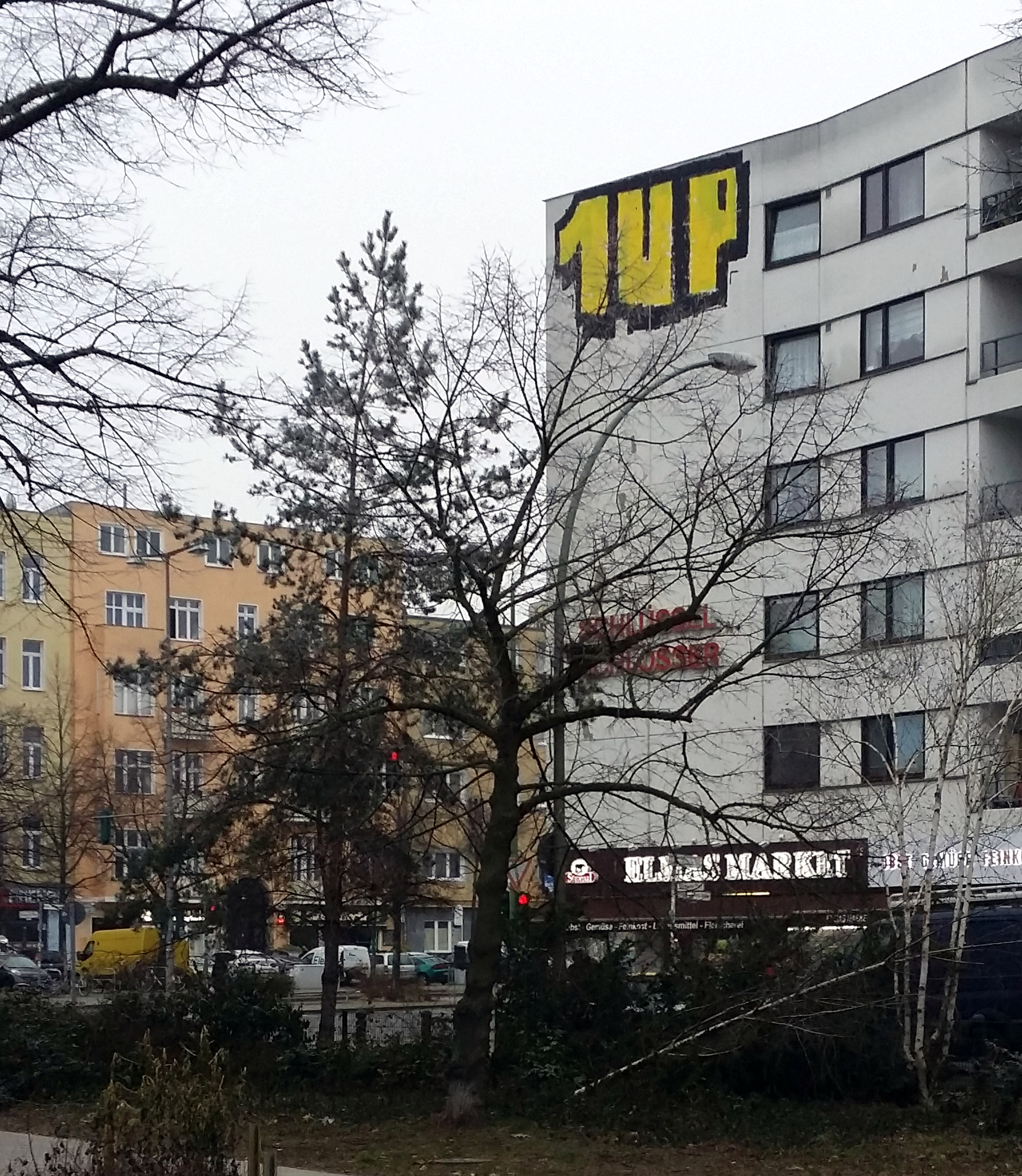
- A 1UP roller piece on a building in Charlottenburg, Berlin
- Other name: One United Power
- Years active: 2003 - present
- Known for: Prolific output
- Notable work: Graffiti Olympics
- Style: Graffiti

1UP (One United Power) is a graffiti crew from the district of Kreuzberg, in Berlin. They have been active since 2003.

1UP have been described as "one of the most well-known graffiti crews in the world" and are known for their bombing (large amount of tags put up in one night), rooftop paintings, and wholecar and wholetrain works.

== Members ==
There has been said to be up to 55 members of different genders, with ages ranging from 20-40. Some members are more active than others. The members are not all German, representing various European countries. All of the members are anonymous, and some do not do solo graffiti, preferring only to tag as 1UP.The group has had over 300 criminal charges filed against them, but none of the members have been caught so far.

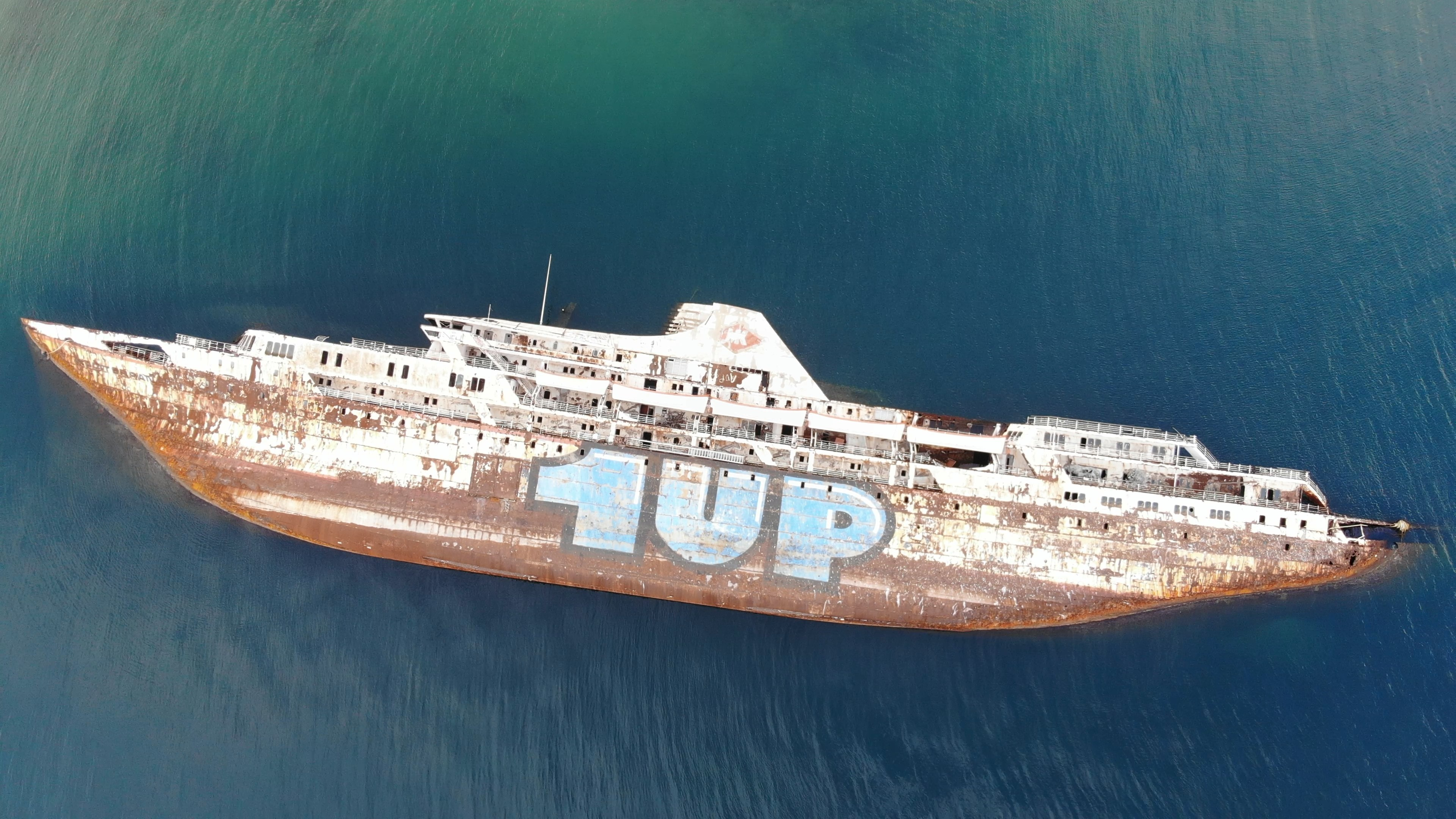
Drone shot of the wreckage of the ship "Mediterranean Sky" in Elusia, Greece

== Publications ==
Their film One United Power was released in 2011 on DVD, and their book I Am 1UP published in 2014. In 2018 1UP collaborated with graffiti photographer Martha Cooper as part of their One Week With 1UP tour. A book about the tour was published by Cooper under the same name.

== Projects ==
Their tags are prolific in Berlin and Athens, where part of the A Week With 1UP tour took place. Their work has appeared around the world including an underwater graffiti piece out of live coral at Nusa Penida and a 2017 piece on the Mediterranean Sky shipwreck which was large enough to be visible from satellites. In collaboration with fellow German crew Berlin Kidz and artist Good Guy Boris, the group produced a performance and video art piece titled Graffiti Olympics using drone footage, which was released on 2 March 2018.

Because of the anonymity of the group, it can be difficult to know if some graffiti is done by real members of the crew or by copycats. The group releases videos documenting some of their pieces, which can be used to authenticate them.

=== Video games ===
The name "1UP" also refers to the power-up that a character can receive in the video game Super Mario when the character gets a power-up mushroom their size increases and they are able to do new things such as break certain blocks.

A 1UP piece is visible in the video game Counter-Strike: Global Offensive, in the Overpass map which is set in Berlin.

== See also ==
Media related to 1UP (sprayer) at Wikimedia Commons1UP
