= Urban Nation =

Museum for urban contemporary art in Berlin, Germany

Urban Nation Museum for Urban Contemporary Art
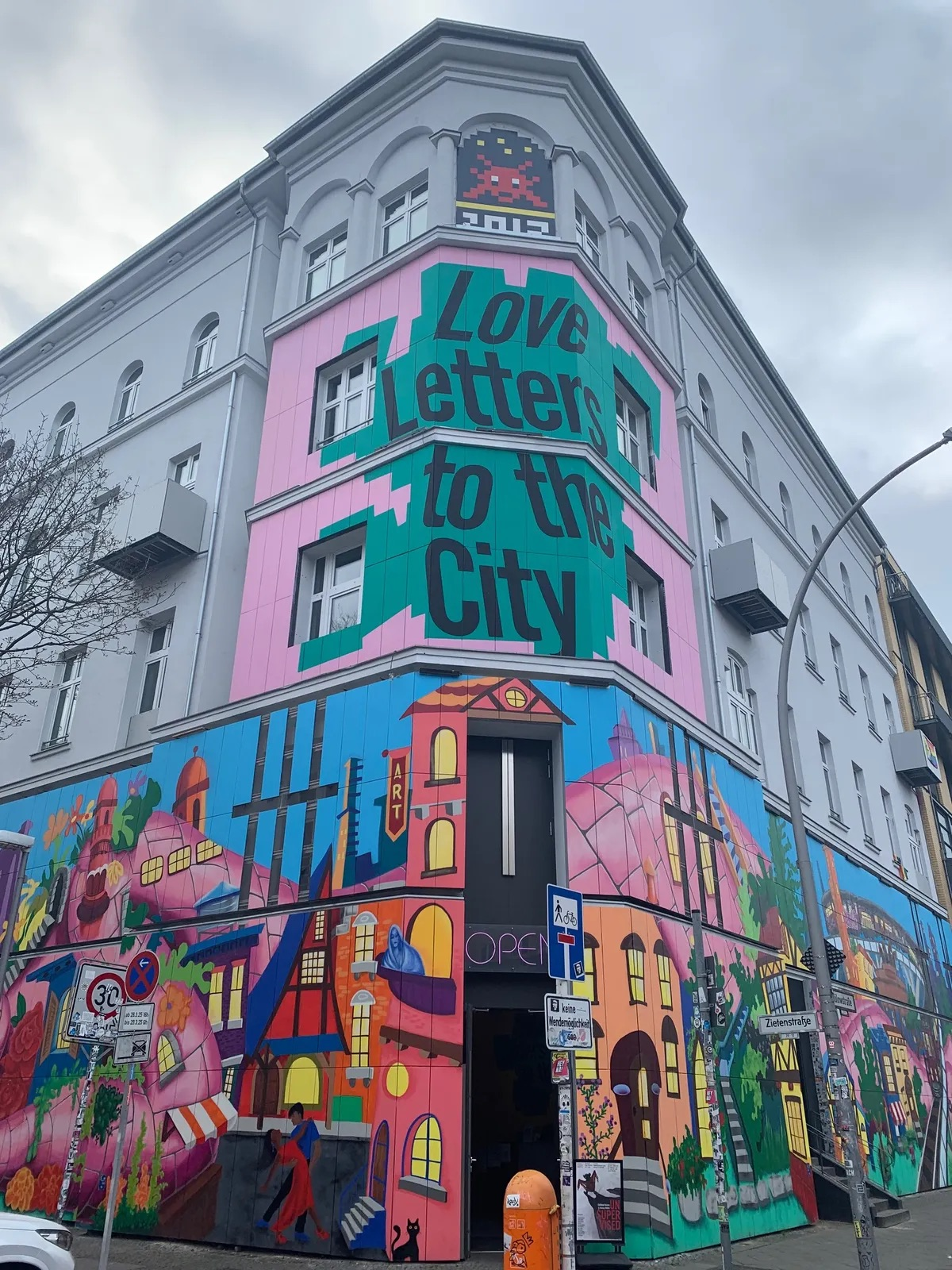
- Established: 2017
- Location: 7 Bülowstraße, Tempelhof-Schöneberg, Berlin, Germany
- Type: Street art, graffiti, urban contemporary art
- Architect: GRAFT
- Public transit access: Nollendorfplatz
- Website: Official website

The Urban Nation Museum for Urban Contemporary Art (often shortened to Urban Nation) is a museum dedicated to street art, graffiti, and urban contemporary art in Berlin, Germany. The museum is located in the Schöneberg district at Bülowstraße 7.

== History ==
Urban Nation was initiated in 2013 as a project of the non-profit Stiftung Berliner Leben (a foundation of the Berlin housing association Gewobag) under the artistic direction of Yasha Young. The goal was to make urban contemporary art accessible to a broad audience by inviting international artists to create public murals throughout Berlin.

In September 2017, after several years of planning, the Urban Nation Museum for Urban Contemporary Art opened to the public in a renovated 1880s Gründerzeit building at Bülowstraße 7, Schöneberg. The architectural redesign was carried out by the Berlin-based office GRAFT, which created a 3,500 m² exhibition space with diagonal bridges and a graffiti-inspired wall.

The exhibition in 2017 featured more than 150 artists, including Shepard Fairey, Herakut, and Martha Cooper. Since then the museum has operated under the motto “Connect. Create. Care.” and hosts regular solo and group exhibitions, artist residencies, and the Martha Cooper Library dedicated to street photography and graffiti history.

== Collection ==
The Urban Nation Museum houses a collection of urban contemporary art, featuring works by over 150 international and local artists from more than 28 countries, as showcased in its inaugural exhibition.

Key artists represented include Shepard Fairey, Invader, Blu, Paradox, Banksy, Vhils, and JR.
