= Munkhammar =

Munkhammar may refer to:

- Lilla Munkhammar, an urban locality in Eskilstuna Municipality, Södermanland County, Sweden sv:Lilla Munkhammar
- Herbert Munkhammar, also known as Afasi (born 1985), Swedish hip hop artist, rapper and singer and part of various formations like Afasi & Filthy, Maskinen and Ansiktet
- Johnny Munkhammar (1974–2012), Swedish political writer and blogger
