= I'm a Dream =

2018 album by Seinabo Sey

Studio album by Seinabo Sey
- Released: 7 September 2018
- Genre: Soul; pop; R&B
- Length: 30
- Label: Universal Sweden
- Producer: Magnus Lidehäll; Salem Al Fakir; Vincent Pontare; Oskar Linnros; Carli Löf

Seinabo Sey chronology
Pretend (2015)	I'm a Dream (2018)	Sweet Life (2021)

Singles from I'm a Dream
- 1. "I Owe You Nothing" / "Remember" Released: March 16, 2018; 2. "Breathe" Released: April 27, 2018; 3. "Good In You" Released: August 23, 2018

I'm a Dream is the second studio album by Swedish singer and songwriter Seinabo Sey, released on 7 September 2018 by Universal Sweden. The album was written by Sey and Isak Alverus, and produced by Magnus Lidehäll, Salem Al Fakir, Vincent Pontare, and Oskar Linnros.

== Background ==
Sey's 2015 debut album Pretend won the acclaim of critics; Time praised it as "One of the Year's Best Debut Albums". Her debut single Younger became a hit – partly because it was remixed by Kygo. Sey's debut launched her into becoming one of Sweden's most beloved pop musicians.

The album title I'm a Dream is an ironic reference to how Sey feels she is anything but.

The album was released on 7 September 2018.

== Music and lyrics ==
I'm a Dream explores genres including soul, pop, R&B, electronic, and gospel. Topical issues touched in the album include being biracial in Sweden, femininity or feminism, identity, body positivity, and grief. The song "Never Get Used To" is about grief, and it is dedicated to Sey's father Maudo Sey, who died in 2013.

Sey drew inspiration for the album specifically from two things: her trip to West Africa and Beyoncé, who is her idol. Sey travelled to West Africa in November 2017 and spent few months there. She shot music videos for "I Owe You Nothing", "Breathe", and "Remember" in The Gambia, which is the birthplace of her father. She did not write any songs in Gambia, but she wrote "Breathe" while in Senegal. The song deals with issues of self-appreciation; she said that she had trouble appreciating herself as a black woman in Sweden because people who look like her are usually under-represented in public life.

In "I Owe You Nothing" she sings "I don't have to smile for you, I don't have to move for you, I don't have to dance monkey dance for you". The song was created when she got sick of how people around her were taking advantage of her benevolence and kindness. She said that in the 2016 Swedish Grammy Awards, everybody was telling her how to act and she had to repeatedly rebut them. She felt uncomfortable, but begun to realise that she would need to stop caring what others think of her. Sey said it was therapeutic to make a song with the message of "fuck everyone".

== Critical reception ==
Professional ratings
Review scores
Source	Rating
Clash	7/10
The Guardian	3/5 stars
Pitchfork	6.0/10

Tara Joshi of The Guardian compared Sey's sound in I'm a Dream and her sound in her debut album Pretend, and said it is now "more forceful and confident, confronting longing, self-esteem and womanhood". She called "I Owe You Nothing" fantastic, but also said it has "propulsive, defiant sentiment" that "feels lacking at times". Joshi concluded the album "quietly tackles femininity and expectations" and is sweet, but also too short and feels incomplete.

Writing for Clash, Ashleigh Grady wrote that Sey has finally found her self-confidence. She said that in "I Owe You Nothing" Sey is "at her fiercest", but greater impact is made in songs that are slower and more poignant. According to Grady, the album is a success due to Sey's "rich and powerful voice".

The Finnish Soundi magazine described Sey's music as soulful and somewhat timeless contemporary pop soul, her lyrics as both ordinary and thoughtful. Soundi said her sparkling voice resembles classical ideals of Nina Simone and that even though Sey pales in comparison to American heavyweight R&B artists, in Nordic context she is one of the best. Finally, the album was criticised for lacking bold production.

Per Magnusson of Aftonbladet called Sey's voice a rare gift and said "Breathe" is a soulful string symphony that sounds like Sey's battle song; a "tribute to Gambia, her past, and future". He said that compared to her previous EPs and the debut album, her sophomore album has more music that does not quite "fit into a mold". Magnusson paraphrased Sey's gospel song "Remember", saying "Seinabo could sing you to the Sun."

GQ called the album phenomenal and said it "sounds wholly cohesive in its variety". According to GQ, "Never Get Used To" is "perhaps the most beautiful song [Sey]'s put on record to date" and stands out on the album.

Anna Lillkung wrote in Hufvudstadsbladet that Sey has gained self-confidence after her previous album. She said the "I Owe You Nothing" captures the whole message of the new album when she sings "I don't have to smile for you / I don't have to move for you". Lillkung concluded that the result is a "concise album of ten songs that have an incredible amount of variation and dynamism".

In 2019, Sey won two Swedish Grammys for her album: Album of the Year and Lyricist of the Year.

== Track listing ==
All lyrics by Seinabo Sey and Isak Alverus.

No.	Title	Length
1.	"I Love You"	3:24
2.	"Never Get Used To"	3:37
3.	"I Owe You Nothing"	3:24
4.	"My Eye"	2:56
5.	"Truth"	3:19
6.	"Remember" (featuring Jacob Banks)	4:19
7.	"Breathe"	3:30
8.	"Hakim"	0:09
9.	"Good In You"	3:28
10.	"Hold Me As I Land"	2:47

== Personnel ==
The album was produced by Magnus Lidehäll, Salem Al Fakir, Vincent Pontare, Oskar Linnros, and Carli Löf.

== Charts ==
Chart (2018)	Peak position
Sweden (Sverigetopplistan)	6
