= The Fault in Our Stars (soundtrack) =

2014 soundtrack album by Josh Boone

The Fault in Our Stars (Music from the Motion Picture)

Soundtrack album by Various artists
- Released: May 19, 2014
- Recorded: 2013–14
- Length: 63:53
- Label: Atlantic; Fox Music
- Producer: Josh Boone (exec.); Marty Bowen (exec.); Wyck Godfrey (exec.); Patrik Berger; Richard Evans; Stefan Gräslund; John Hill; Søren Løkke Juul; Season Kent; Lykke Li; Johnny McDaid; Ryan Rabin; Jasmine Van Den Bogaerde; Kevin Weaver; Dan Wilson; Björn Yttling

Singles from The Fault in Our Stars (Music from the Motion Picture)
- 1. "Boom Clap" Released: April 11, 2014; 2. "Not About Angels" Released: 2014; 3. "All of the Stars" Released: May 9, 2014

The Fault in Our Stars (Music from the Motion Picture) is the soundtrack for the American romantic comedy-drama film The Fault in Our Stars. The full track list was released on April 13, 2014, and arranged by Nate Walcott and Mike Mogis of Bright Eyes. It includes a few high-profile artists like Kodaline, Birdy and Ed Sheeran, the last of whom wrote the song for the end credits ("All of the Stars"). The soundtrack was released in North America on May 19, 2014, and in the United Kingdom on June 23, 2014.

The lead single from the soundtrack is Charli XCX's contribution "Boom Clap", which debuted on April 11, 2014, and the music video for which premiered June 2. A music video for Sheeran's "All of the Stars" was released May 9, 2014. Music videos were also released for Birdy's "Tee Shirt" on June 6, 2014, and "Not About Angels" on June 12, 2014.

The theme song for the Japanese version is "Lil Infinity" by AAA.

== Track listing ==
No.	Title	Writer(s)	Producer(s)	Length
1.	"All of the Stars" (Ed Sheeran)	Sheeran; Johnny McDaid	McDaid	3:55
2.	"Simple as This" (Jake Bugg)	Bugg; Matthew Prime	Prime	3:17
3.	"Let Me In" (Grouplove)	Grouplove	Ryan Rabin	3:59
4.	"Tee Shirt" (Birdy)	Dan Wilson; Jasmine van den Bogaerde	Wilson	2:39
5.	"All I Want" (Kodaline)	Kodaline; James Flannigan	Stephen Harris	5:06
6.	"Long Way Down" (Tom Odell)	Odell	Dan Grech-Marguerat	2:30
7.	"Boom Clap" (Charli XCX)	Charlotte Aitchison; Patrik Berger; Stefan Gräslund	Berger; Gräslund	2:49
8.	"While I'm Alive" (Strfkr)	Joshua Hodges	Strfkr	3:48
9.	"Oblivion" (Indians)	Søren Løkke Juul	Indians	3:39
10.	"Strange Things Will Happen" (The Radio Dept.)	Johan Duncanson	Duncanson; Martin Larsson	4:26
11.	"Bomfalleralla" (Afasi & Filthy)	Herbert Munkhammar; Magnus Lidehäll	Afasi & Filthy	3:57
12.	"Without Words" (Ray LaMontagne)	LaMontagne	LaMontagne	4:18
13.	"Not About Angels" (Birdy)	Van den Bogaerde	Birdy; Richard Evans	3:09
14.	"No One Ever Loved" (Lykke Li)	Li; Björn Yttling	Li; Yttling	4:05
15.	"Wait" (M83)	Anthony Gonzalez; Justin Meldal-Johnsen	Gonzalez	5:44
16.	"Best Shot" (bonus track) (Birdy featuring Jaymes Young)	Wilson; van den Bogaerde	Wilson; John Hill
Total length:				1:03:53

== Credits and personnel ==
Credits and personnel for the soundtrack adapted from AllMusic.

- Afasi – primary artist
- Afasi & Filthy – primary artist
- Charlotte Aitchison – composer
- Sachiko Asano – art direction, design
- Fredrik Berger – composer
- Patrik Berger – composer, producer
- Birdy – primary artist
- Josh Boone – executive producer, liner notes
- Marty Bowen – executive producer
- Michael H. Brauer – mixing
- Jake Bugg – primary artist
- Tom Cavanaugh – music business affairs
- Charli XCX – primary artist
- Jana Coffey – coordination
- Keil Corcoran – composer
- Tony Corey – marketing
- Ruadhri Cushnan – mixing
- Danielle Diego – executive in charge of music
- Johan Duncanson – composer
- Richard Evans – mixing, producer
- Filthy – primary artist
- James Flannigan – composer
- Pete Ganbarg – A&R
- Steve Garrigan – composer
- Chris Gehringer – mastering
- Ellen Ginsburg – music clearance
- Shawn Glassford – composer
- Wyck Godfrey – executive producer
- Anthony Gonzalez – composer
- Yann Gonzalez – composer
- Stefan Gräslund – composer, producer
- Grouplove – composer, primary artist
- John Hill – producer
- Joshua Hodges – composer
- Patrick Houlihan – music supervisor
- Indians – primary artist
- Søren Løkke Juul – composer, producer
- Jake Kennedy – composer
- Season Kent – music supervisor, producer
- Joseph Khoury – coordination
- Kodaline – primary artist
- Ray LaMontagne – primary artist
- Ray LaMontagne – composer
- Lykke Li – composer, primary artist, producer
- Magnus Lindehäll – composer
- M83 – primary artist
- Lasse Marten – mixing
- Vincent May – composer
- Johnny McDaid – composer, engineer, producer
- Justin Meldal-Johnsen – composer
- Patrick Morris – composer
- Herbert Munkhammar – composer
- Tom Odell – composer, primary artist
- Rob Orton – mixing
- Mark Prendergast – composer
- Matthew Prime – composer
- Areli Quirarte – management
- Ryan Rabin – mixing, producer
- The Radio Dept. – primary artist
- John Rausch – engineer, mixing
- Sam Riback – A&R
- Craig Rosen – A&R
- Ed Sheeran – composer, primary artist
- STRFKR – primary artist
- Carolyn Tracey – package production
- Jasmine Van Den Bogaerde – composer, producer
- Kevin Weaver – A&R, producer
- Dan Wilson – composer, producer
- Jaymes Young – primary artist
- Björn Yttling – composer, producer
- Cindy Zaplachinski – legal advisor, music business affairs

== Charts ==
=== Weekly charts ===
Chart (2014)	Peak position
Australian Albums (ARIA)	11
Austrian Albums (Ö3 Austria)	63
Belgian Albums (Ultratop Flanders)	48
Belgian Albums (Ultratop Wallonia)	85
Canadian Albums (Billboard)	11
Danish Albums (Hitlisten)	23
Finnish Albums (Suomen virallinen lista)	31
Italian Compilation Albums (FIMI)	4
South Korean Albums (Circle)	42
South Korean International Albums (Circle)	5
Mexican Albums (AMPROFON)	12
Norwegian Albums (VG-lista)	14
New Zealand Albums (RMNZ)	14
US Billboard 200	5
US Top Alternative Albums (Billboard)	2
US Top Rock Albums (Billboard)	2
US Soundtrack Albums (Billboard)	2

=== Year-end charts ===
Chart (2014)	Position
US Alternative Albums (Billboard)	11
US Billboard 200	82
US Top Rock Albums (Billboard)	14
US Soundtracks (Billboard)	3

== Certifications ==
Region	Certification	Certified units/sales
United Kingdom (BPI)	Gold	100,000^{‡}
United States (RIAA)	Gold	500,000^{‡}
^{‡} Sales+streaming figures based on certification alone.

== Original score ==
The Fault in Our Stars (Score from the Motion Picture)

Film score by Mike Mogis and Nate Walcott
- Released: June 9, 2014
- Recorded: 2013–14
- Length: 47:03
- Label: Atlantic; Fox Music
- Producer: Mike Mogis; Nate Walcott

The Fault in Our Stars (Score from the Motion Picture) is the soundtrack, which had 31 instrumental pieces recorded and produced by Mike Mogis and Nate Walcott, and the film score was recorded during 2013–14. The score was released by Atlantic Records and Fox Music on June 9, 2014.

All music is composed by Mike Mogis and Nate Walcott.

No.	Title	Length
1.	"Opening Titles"	0:58
2.	"Hazel Intro"	0:40
3.	"Hazel Checkup"	0:28
4.	"Hazel And Gus Intro-Staring"	0:58
5.	"Always"	0:42
6.	"Young Hazel Montage"	1:23
7.	"Cold Hands"	0:18
8.	"The Thing About Pain"	0:41
9.	"Letter to Van Houten"	1:16
10.	"Okay"	0:31
11.	"Hazel X-Ray"	0:31
12.	"Funky Bones"	1:28
13.	"Surprise"	0:53
14.	"Hazel Emergency"	0:52
15.	"Doctor Said No"	1:44
16.	"One Sad Swingset"	0:43
17.	"Thanks for Understanding"	1:00
18.	"Mom and Hazel"	0:49
19.	"I Love You"	1:01
20.	"Disappointment"	1:22
21.	"Anne Frank House"	3:28
22.	"The Kiss"	1:34
23.	"Love Making"	2:55
24.	"Christmas Tree"	2:39
25.	"Buying Eggs"	0:38
26.	"Ambulance"	2:22
27.	"Funky Bones 2 Pt. 1"	1:21
28.	"Funky Bones 2 Pt. 2"	2:07
29.	"Issac Eulogy"	3:16
30.	"Hazel Eulogy"	2:15
31.	"The Great and Terrible 10"	5:56
Total length:		47:03
