= Afasi =

Afasi may refer to

- Aphasia, an impairment of language ability
- Afasi, nickname for Swedish hip hop artist Herbert Munkhammar, part of Afasi & Filthy, Maskinen and Ansiktet
  - Afasi & Filthy, Swedish hip hop duo
- Mishari Rashid Al-Afasy, Kuwaiti sheikh, a qari and a munshid
- Hamad Al-Afasi, a shooting sportsman
