= Magnus Lidehäll =

Swedish award-winning producer, composer, and songwriter

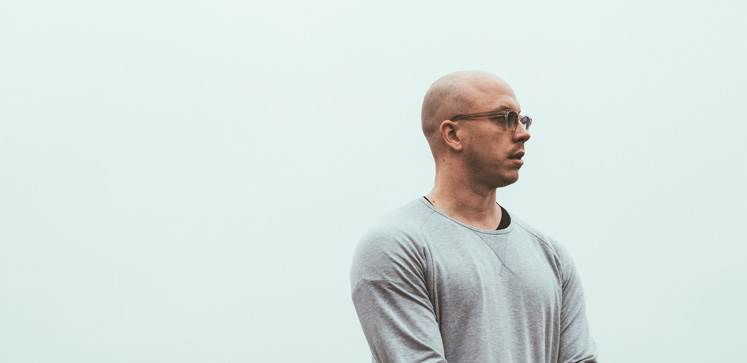
- Photo: Gustav Wiking

Background information
- Also known as: MagnusTheMagnus, Filthy
- Born: 10 June 1985 (age 41)
- Origin: Uppsala, Sweden
- Genres: Pop, electro, hip hop
- Occupations: Songwriter, producer
- Years active: 2002–present

Magnus Lidehäll is a Swedish award-winning producer, composer, and songwriter. He works closely with the songwriting duo Vargas & Lagola – with whom he won the composer of the year award at the Swedish Grammy Awards in 2014. Together they have produced, written, and/or co-written songs for Madonna, Wyclef Jean & Avicii ("Divine Sorrow"), Veronica Maggio and Petter, to name a few.

== Career ==
Magnus Lidehäll started in a rap / hip hop duo alongside Herbert Munkhammar called Afasi & Filthy. "1990 Nånting", released with the band Snook in 2002, was their biggest hit. Between 2007 and 2008 he became a member of the successful formation Maskinen. He left Maskinen to focus on writing and producing music for other artists. Today he has a great résumé working with both international and local Swedish artists such as: Seinabo Sey, David Guetta, Katy Perry, Madonna, Silk City, Britney Spears and many more. He has also worked with producers such as Bloodshy & Avant and Sebastian Ingrosso.

Together with Bloodshy and Henrik Jonback Magnus co-wrote and produced "How I Roll" & "Trip To Your Heart" from Britney Spears's album Femme Fatale, which was released in March 2011.

On Katy Perry's 2013 album "Prism". he co-wrote and produced "Love Me" with Bloodshy, Vincent Pontare and Camela Leierth. He also co-wrote and produced the single "Don't Wait" from Mapei, released on Downtown Records in the same year as well as her 2014 debut album "Hey Hey".

Magnus played a key role in breaking Seinabo Sey, co-writing and producing all songs on her EP "For Madeleine", for which he was awarded producer of the year at 2015's Grammis (Swedish Grammy Awards), and her debut album "Pretend" and sophomore album "I'm A Dream" . He also collaborated on David Guetta's 2015 single "Bang My Head" (feat. Sia & Fetty Wap).

Since 2016 Magnus has released songs under his producer alias MagnusTheMagnus. The music turned out to fit perfectly for video and has been featured in campaigns for brands like Apple, Nike and Cartier. "Area" and "Keep on Lovin’" were featured in the iPhone 8 and iPhone X reveals respectively, "Area" later led Billboard's Top TV Commercials Chart. One of his lesser known songs Calling was used in a Santander, a Polish bank, commercial, leading to an influx of Polish listeners who fondly remembered the commercial.

== Studio Gottefar ==
Studio Gottefar is managed by Magnus Lindhäll, Vincent Pontare and Salem Al Fakir and is located in the old Traxton studios near Slussen in Stockholm, Sweden. Jonas Wikström, friend of the trio and head of A&R at Universal Music Publishing Group Scandinavia, described Gottefar as "a creative hub for working with diverse artists and projects".

== Discography ==
Producer / writer credits
| Song | Year | Album |
|---|---|---|
| "Because of You" | 2009 | After School - Single |
| "Cupid Boy" | 2010 | Kylie Minogue - Aphrodite |
| "One" | 2010 | Sky Ferreira - Single |
| "How I Roll" | 2011 | Britney Spears - Femme Fatale |
| "Trip To Your Heart" | 2011 | Britney Spears - Femme Fatale |
| "Haters anonymous" | 2011 | Sky Ferreira - As If! |
| "Antidote" (feat. MagnusTheMagnus) | 2011 | Style of Eye - Single |
| "Shameless" | 2012 | Coco Morier - Strangers May Kiss |
| "Hallucination" | 2012 | Coco Morier - Strangers May Kiss |
| "Got me good" | 2012 | Agnes - Veritas |
| "Afterlife" | 2012 | Coco Morier - INGRID Volym 1 |
| "Love Me" | 2013 | Katy Perry - PRISM |
| "I Get What I Want" | 2013 | Coco Morier & Max Von Sydow - Gunwolf: Get Ready to Get Killed (Original Soundtrack) |
| "Strangers" | 2013 | Little Boots - Nocturnes |
| "You" | 2014 | Galantis - Galantis - EP |
| "Friend (Hard Time)" | 2014 | Galantis - Galantis - EP |
| "Got Me Good (Bassflow Remake) | 2014 | Agnes - Collection |
| "Don't Go Breaking My Heart" | 2014 | Agnes - Collection |
| "Don't Wait" | 2014 | Mapei - Hey Hey |
| "Change" | 2014 | Mapei - Hey Hey |
| "Blame It On Me" | 2014 | Mapei - Hey Hey |
| "Come On Baby" | 2014 | Mapei - Hey Hey |
| "Things You Know Nothing About" | 2014 | Mapei - Hey Hey |
| "As 1" | 2014 | Mapei - Hey Hey |
| "Second To None" | 2014 | Mapei - Hey Hey |
| "Believe" | 2014 | Mapei - Hey Hey |
| "Step Up" | 2014 | Mapei - Hey Hey |
| "Keep It Cool" | 2014 | Mapei - Hey Hey |
| "What's Innit 4 Me" | 2014 | Mapei - Hey Hey |
| "Baby It's You" | 2014 | Mapei - Hey Hey |
| "No More Michael Jackson" | 2014 | Teddybears - Single |
| "Divine Sorrow" (feat. Avicii) | 2014 | Wyclef Jean - Single |
| "Bang My Head" (feat. Sia) | 2014 | David Guetta - Listen |
| "Rubber Band Stacks" | 2015 | Brooke Candy - Single |
| "HeartBreakCity" | 2015 | Madonna - Rebel Heart |
| "Wash All Over Me" | 2015 | Madonna - Rebel Heart |
| "Younger" | 2015 | Seinabo Sey - Pretend |
| "Pretend" | 2015 | Seinabo Sey - Pretend |
| "Poetic" | 2015 | Seinabo Sey - Pretend |
| "Hard Time" | 2015 | Seinabo Sey - Pretend |
| "Easy" | 2015 | Seinabo Sey - Pretend |
| "Words" | 2015 | Seinabo Sey - Pretend |
| "Sorry" | 2015 | Seinabo Sey - Pretend |
| "Who" | 2015 | Seinabo Sey - Pretend |
| "Still" | 2015 | Seinabo Sey - Pretend |
| "You" | 2015 | Seinabo Sey - Pretend |
| "Ruin" | 2015 | Seinabo Sey - Pretend |
| "Burial" | 2015 | Seinabo Sey - Pretend |
| "Pistols At Dawn" | 2015 | Seinabo Sey - Pretend |
| "River" | 2015 | Seinabo Sey - Pretend |
| "Dark River" | 2016 | Sebastian Ingrosso - Single |
| "FLAGS!" (feat. LIOHN & Salvatore Ganacci) | 2016 | Sebastian Ingrosso - Single |
| "Another Dimension" | 2016 | MishCatt - Highlighter |
| "Gun To The Head" | 2016 | MishCatt - Highlighter |
| "Saturn Eyes" | 2016 | MishCatt - Highlighter |
| "Area" | 2016 | MagnusTheMagnus - Single |
| "Realligator" | 2016 | MagnusTheMagnus - Single |
| "Renegade" | 2017 | Axwell & Ingrosso - More Than You Know |
| "It Don't Impress Me" (feat. Madi Banja) | 2018 | MagnusTheMagnus - Single |
| "Feel About You" (feat. Mapei) | 2018 | Silk City - Single |
| "I Love You" | 2018 | Seinabo Sey - I'm A Dream |
| "Never Get Used To" | 2018 | Seinabo Sey - I'm A Dream |
| "I Owe You Nothing" | 2018 | Seinabo Sey - I'm A Dream |
| "My Eye" | 2018 | Seinabo Sey - I'm A Dream |
| "Truth" | 2018 | Seinabo Sey - I'm A Dream |
| "Remember" (feat. Jacob Banks) | 2018 | Seinabo Sey - I'm A Dream |
| "Breathe" | 2018 | Seinabo Sey - I'm A Dream |
| "Good In You" | 2018 | Seinabo Sey - I'm A Dream |
| "Subaru" | 2018 | MagnusTheMagnus - Single |
| "Calling" (feat. KIDDO) | 2018 | MagnusTheMagnus - Single |
| "Sensory Overload" | 2019 | Mapei - Sensory Overload |
| "Visions" | 2019 | Mapei - Sensory Overload |
| "Lykklebit" | 2019 | Mapei - Sensory Overload |
| "2 Cents" | 2019 | Mapei - Sensory Overload |
| "Sooner Or Later" | 2019 | Mapei - Sensory Overload |
| "Ether" | 2019 | Mapei - Sensory Overload |
| "Auto" | 2021 | MagnusTheMagnus - Single |
| "Kick Snare" | 2021 | MagnusTheMagnus - Single |
| "Repeater" | 2021 | MagnusTheMagnus - Single |
| "Love Songs" | 2021 | MagnusTheMagnus - Single |
| "Remote" | 2021 | MagnusTheMagnus - Single |
| "New Again" | 2021 | Kanye West - Donda |
| "Heaven Takes You Home" (feat. Connie Constance) | 2022 | Swedish House Mafia - Paradise Again |
| "Home" | 2022 | Swedish House Mafia - Paradise Again |
| "It Gets Better" | 2022 | Swedish House Mafia - Paradise Again |
| "Wander Off" | 2022 | Esther - Wander |
| "Habits of Creatures" | 2026 | Carly Rae Jepsen - Day and Night |
| "Blue Skies" | 2026 | Carly Rae Jepsen - Day and Night |
| "Good Fine Alright" | 2026 | Carly Rae Jepsen - Day and Night |
| "Reaching for a Star" | 2026 | Carly Rae Jepsen - Day and Night |
| "Amalfi Coast" | 2026 | Carly Rae Jepsen - Day and Night |
| "Near or Far" | 2026 | Carly Rae Jepsen - Day and Night |
| "Muscle Memory" | 2026 | Carly Rae Jepsen - Day and Night |

Producer / writer credits for local Swedish artists
| Song | Year | Album |
|---|---|---|
| "Svennebanan" | 2009 | Promoe - Kråksången |
| "Dekadansen" | 2009 | Promoe - Kråksången |
| "Segertåget" | 2009 | Maskinen - Boys II Men |
| "Alla som inte dansar" | 2009 | Maskinen - Boys II Men |
| "Idiot" | 2011 | Lena Philipsson - Single |
| "Du suger" | 2012 | Maskinen - Framgång & Efterfrågan |
| "Stora trygga vargen" | 2012 | Maskinen - Framgång & Efterfrågan |
| "Mighty" (Feat. Newkid) | 2013 | Petter - Början på allt |
| "Början på allt" (Feat. Eye N' I) | 2013 | Petter - Början på allt |
| "April" | 2013 | Petter - Början på allt |
| "Håll om mig" (Feat. Daniel Adams-Ray) | 2013 | Petter - Början på allt |
| "Tills döden skiljer oss åt" | 2013 | Petter - Början på allt |
| "King" (Feat. Lilla Namo) | 2013 | Petter - Början på allt |
| "Maj" | 2013 | Petter - Början på allt |
| "Arbete" | 2013 | Petter - Början på allt |
| "Alla vet" (Feat. Agnes) | 2013 | Petter - Början på allt |
| "Fristad" | 2013 | Petter - Början på allt |
| "Juni" | 2013 | Petter - Början på allt |
| "Sitter på en dröm" | 2013 | Petter - Början på allt |
| "Minnen del 2" | 2013 | Petter - Början på allt |
| "Släpp mig fri" | 2013 | Petter - Början på allt |
| "Sergels Torg" | 2013 | Veronica Maggio - Handen i fickan fast jag bryr mig |
| "Jag Lovar" | 2013 | Veronica Maggio - Handen i fickan fast jag bryr mig |
| "Hela Huset" | 2013 | Veronica Maggio - Handen i fickan fast jag bryr mig |
| "Va Kvar" | 2013 | Veronica Maggio - Handen i fickan fast jag bryr mig |
| "Låtsas Som Det Regnar" | 2013 | Veronica Maggio - Handen i fickan fast jag bryr mig |
| "Hädanefter" | 2013 | Veronica Maggio - Handen i fickan fast jag bryr mig |
| "Dallas" | 2013 | Veronica Maggio - Handen i fickan fast jag bryr mig |
| "Bas Gillar Hörn" | 2013 | Veronica Maggio - Handen i fickan fast jag bryr mig |
| "I Min Bil" | 2013 | Veronica Maggio - Handen i fickan fast jag bryr mig |
| "Mingla" | 2013 | Ansiktet - #DENNYARNBMANNEN |
| "Singel" | 2013 | Ansiktet - #DENNYARNBMANNEN |
| "Vi mot världen" | 2016 | Veronica Maggio - Den första är alltid gratis |
| "Pang pang" | 2016 | Veronica Maggio - Den första är alltid gratis |
| "Wifi" | 2017 | Oskar Linnros - Väntar på en ängel |
| "En grej i taget" (feat. Mapei & MagnusTheMagnus) | 2018 | Petter - Lev nu |
| "Ikväll" (feat. Ana Diaz) | 2018 | Petter - Dö sen |

Albums and EPs with Afasi & Filthy
| Year | Album |
|---|---|
| 2002 | Snus, Porr och Brännvin |
| 2003 | 1990 Nånting EP |
| 2005 | Jag kunde inte bry mig mindre EP |
| 2006 | Hotell Stress |
| 2006 | Skruvat & choppat av Afasi |
| 2006 | Hotell Stress vol. 2 |
| 2008 | Fläcken |

Singles with Afasi & Filthy
| Year | Album |
|---|---|
| 2003 | "1990 nånting" feat. Snook |
| 2004 | "Bomfalleralla" |
| 2005 | "Le Parkour" |
| 2006 | "Hej hej" |
| 2006 | "Eller hur!?" |
| 2007 | "Fredag hela månan" |
| 2008 | "Glider" |
| 2008 | "Jobb" |
| 2008 | "Sverigetrotters" |
