= Pretend (album) =

Studio album by Seinabo Sey
- Released: 23 October 2015
- Genre: Soul pop, electropop
- Length: 40:59
- Label: Universal Sweden
- Producer: Magnus Lidehäll

Seinabo Sey chronology
Pretend (2015)	I'm a Dream (2018)

Singles from Pretend
- 1. "Younger" Released: 22 November 2013; 2. "Hard Time" Released: 5 May 2014; 3. "Pretend" Released: 17 July 2015

Professional ratings
Review scores
Source	Rating
Aftonbladet	4/5 stars
Gaffa	5/6 stars
The Independent	4/5 stars
The Guardian	3/5 stars

Pretend is the debut studio album by Swedish singer and songwriter Seinabo Sey, released on 23 October 2015 by Universal Sweden. It was produced by Magnus Lidehäll. The album features the singles "Younger", "Hard Time" and "Pretend".

== Track listing ==
No.	Title	Writer(s)	Length
1.	"Younger"	Seinabo Sey; Vincent Pontare; Magnus Lidehäll; Salem Al Fakir	3:34
2.	"Pretend"	Sey; Lidehäll	3:29
3.	"Poetic"	Sey; Pontare; Lidehäll; Al Fakir	3:02
4.	"Hard Time"	Sey; Pontare; Lidehäll; Al Fakir	3:29
5.	"Easy"	Sey; Lidehäll; Al Fakir	2:47
6.	"Words"	Sey; Lidehäll; Al Fakir	3:29
7.	"Sorry"	Sey; Pontare; Lidehäll; Al Fakir	3:32
8.	"Who"	Sey; Lidehäll	3:18
9.	"Still"	Sey; Lidehäll; Al Fakir	2:53
10.	"You"	Sey; Hans Linnros; Lidehäll	3:41
11.	"Ruin"	Set; Pontare; Lidehäll; Al Fakir	3:33
12.	"Burial"	Sey; Lidehäll; Al Fakir	4:12
13.	"Pistols at Dawn" (bonus track)	Sey; Pontare; Lidehäll; Al Fakir	3:38
14.	"River" (bonus track)	Sey; Lidehäll	3:44
15.	"Younger" (Kygo remix) (bonus track)	Sey; Pontare; Lidehäll; Al Fakir	5:51
16.	"Younger" (acoustic version) (bonus track)	Sey; Pontare; Lidehäll; Al Fakir	4:12

== Charts ==
=== Weekly charts ===
Chart (2015–16)	Peak position
Norwegian Albums (VG-lista)	29
Swedish Albums (Sverigetopplistan)	4
Swiss Albums (Schweizer Hitparade)	87
UK Album Downloads Chart (OCC)	50

=== Year-end charts ===
Chart (2015)	Position
Swedish Albums (Sverigetopplistan)	98
Chart (2016)	Position
Swedish Albums (Sverigetopplistan)	76

== Certifications ==
Region	Certification	Certified units/sales
Norway (IFPI Norway)	Platinum	30,000^{‡}
Sweden (GLF)	Gold	20,000^{‡}
^{‡} Sales+streaming figures based on certification alone.
