= Seinabo Sey =

Swedish singer (born 1990)

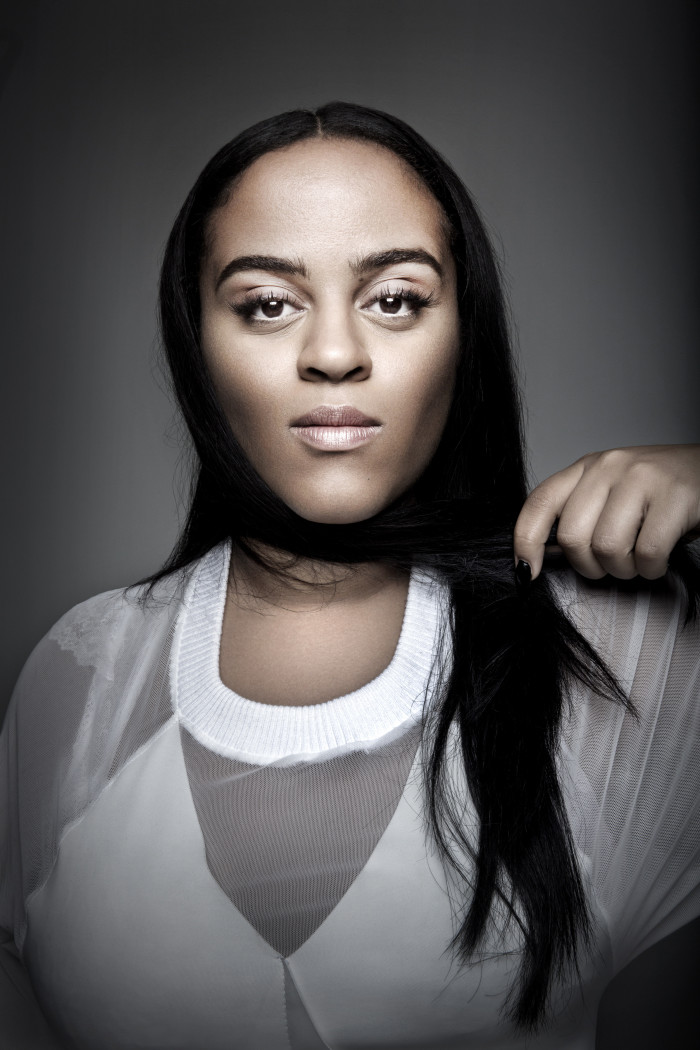
- Sey in 2014

Background information
- Born: 7 October 1990 (age 35); Stockholm, Sweden
- Genres: Soul; pop; electropop
- Occupations: Singer; songwriter
- Years active: 2013–present
- Labels: Universal; Virgin
- Website: seinabosey.com

Seinabo Sey (born 7 October 1990) is a Swedish soul and pop singer, best known for her international hit song "Younger".

== Early life ==
Seinabo Sey was born in Södermalm, Stockholm, on 7 October 1990. She is of both Swedish and Gambian ancestry. She moved to Halmstad, Sweden, at the age of eight, and attended Östergårdsskolans music program for musically gifted teenagers.

Sey was inspired musically by artists such as Alicia Keys and Beyoncé early in life. She grew up in Halmstad, Sweden, surrounded by artistry and creativity. Her father Maudo Sey was a renowned musician in The Gambia and Senegal, West Africa. Her mother, Madeleine Sundqvist, is Swedish. Seinabo Sey has two siblings; a younger brother Maudo Sey jr and sister Seidato Sey, she is also half-sister to the artist Fatima Bramme Sey and the radio host Amie Bramme Sey. In an interview, Sey recalled being nine years old and watching MTV, which led her to become obsessed with music and singing. Sey wanted to study at Yale as an adolescent, being inspired by the character Rory Gilmore on the television show Gilmore Girls. She took academic steps towards that dream, enrolling in an International Baccalaureate program in Halmstad, Sweden, although at the age of 16 she ended up changing course, moving to Stockholm to attend and later graduate from Fryshusets esthetics program with a concentration in soul music.

In an interview Sey noted: "I was really academically tracked... I loved to sing but I could never fathom singing by myself. I tried to push away the whole music dream and thought I had to do something more in line with that, like becoming a lawyer or something, until I was around sixteen. But then I realised I couldn't really live in that small town so I moved to Stockholm and started music school".

== Career ==
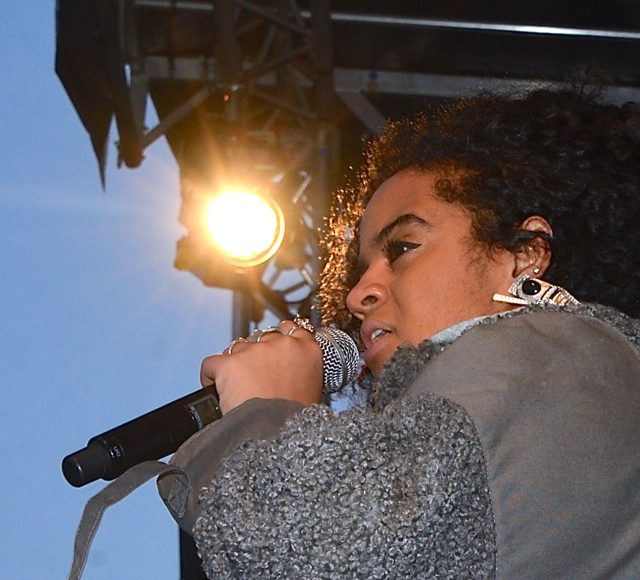
Sey performing in 2013

After Sey started working with producer Magnus Lidehäll she released her debut single "Younger", followed by "Hard Time" and "Pistols at Dawn". The singles, which were described as soul pop, received much attention and accolades in Sweden and abroad. Kygo, a Norwegian musician, remixed "Younger", releasing it in Norway and the United States. This version, known as "Younger (Kygo Remix)", peaked on the Norwegian VG-lista chart (for seven consecutive weeks) and on the US Billboard Hot Dance Club Songs. On 16 April 2015, "Younger" was featured on BBC Radio 1 as their Track of the Day.

In 2014, EDM duo Galantis used a sample of Sey's single "Hard Times" in a song that appears on their self-titled EP titled "Friends (Hard Times)".

Sey performed at the 2014 Swedish Grammy Awards and at Allsång på Skansen in Stockholm. In October 2014, Seinabo Sey released the critically acclaimed EP For Madeleine, dedicated to and named after her mother. The EP was produced by Magnus Lidehäll and written by, among others, Salem Al Fakir, Oscar Linnros and Vincent Pontare, along with Seinabo Sey herself. That same month, she performed at the Royal Dramatic Theatre in Stockholm. She also performed at the 2014 Nobel Peace Prize concert.

On 30 March 2015 Sey released her second EP, the four-track For Maudo, dedicated to and named after her father, Maudo Sey. Repeating the success of For Madeleine, the EP received favorable reviews and widespread critical acclaim in Sweden and abroad. For Maudo was produced by Magnus Lidehäll, and one Swedish review described the EP as a "weightless and spellbinding" crossover between soul and modern pop. Another review described the EP as being composed of "exceptionally beautiful music".

On 23 October 2015 Sey released her first album, called Pretend. The album contains 16 tracks, including "Younger" and "Hard Time". In November 2016, the album's titular track "Pretend" was the featured music in the season 6. Girls trailer. The track was also featured in the soundtrack of FIFA 16.

Also in 2015, parts of her 2014 song, "Hard Time", was utilized as theme song for Swedish murder-mystery TV series, 100 Code (Hundred Code). The show screened in Germany and then spread to other countries; it is now on rerun on cable in the United States and elsewhere.

In 2017, her song "Easy" was featured in the film Beyond Dreams.

On 7 September 2018 she released her second album I'm a Dream which contains 10 songs.

== Awards and accolades ==
- 2014 - Breakthrough of the year - 2014 Swedish Music Publishers Prize
- 2015 - Best Newcomer - 2014 Swedish Grammy Awards
- 2015 - Soul/R&B artist of the year - 2014 Kingsize Awards

== Discography ==
=== Albums ===
Title	Album details	Peak chart positions			Certifications
Title	Album details	SWE	NOR	SWI	Certifications
Pretend	Released: 23 October 2015; Label: Saraba AB; Formats: CD, LP, digital download, streaming	4	29	87	GLF: Gold; IFPI NOR: Platinum
I'm a Dream	Released: 7 September 2018; Label: Saraba AB; Formats: CD, digital download, streaming	6	—	—	
The One After Me	Released: 26 May 2023; Label: Saraba AB; Formats: CD, digital download, streaming	58	—	—	

=== Extended plays ===
Title	Album details	Peak chart positions
Title	Album details	US Heat.
For Madeleine	Released: 26 January 2015; Label: Saraba AB; Formats: Digital download, streaming	23
Sweet Life	Released: 4 June 2021; Label: Saraba AB; Formats: Digital download, streaming	—

=== Singles ===
List of singles as a lead artist, with selected details and chart positions
Title	Year	Peak chart positions									Certifications	Album
Title	Year	SWE	AUT	BEL (FL)	BEL (WA)	DEN	NOR	SCO	UK	US Dance	Certifications	Album
"Younger"	2013	14	54	32	44	12	1	32	61	48	GLF: 4× Platinum; BPI: Silver; IFPI DEN: Platinum; IFPI NOR: 7× Platinum	Pretend
"Hard Time"	2014	— (Note: "Hard Time" did not enter the Swedish singles chart, but peaked at number seven on the Swedish Heatseeker chart.)	—	— (Note: "Hard Time" did not enter the Ultratop 50, but peaked at number 14 on the Flemish Ultratip chart.)	—	—	—	—	—	—	GLF: Gold; IFPI NOR: Gold	Pretend
"Poetic"	2015	— (Note: "Poetic" did not enter the Swedish Singles Chart, but peaked at number six on the Swedish Heatseeker chart.)	—	—	—	—	—	—	—	—		Pretend
"Sorry"	2016	—	—	—	—	—	—	—	—	—		Pretend
"Easy"	2016	— (Note: "Easy" did not enter the Swedish Singles Chart, but peaked at number one on the Swedish Heatseeker chart.)	—	—	—	—	—	—	—	—		Pretend
"I Owe You Nothing"	2018	66	—	—	— (Note: "I Own You Nothing" did not enter the Ultratop 50, but peaked at number 36 on the Wallonie Ultratip chart.)	—	—	—	—	—		I'm a Dream
"Remember" (featuring Jacob Banks)	2018	— (Note: "Remember" did not enter the Swedish singles chart, but peaked at number seven on the Swedish Heatseeker chart.)	—	—	—	—	—	—	—	—		I'm a Dream
"Breathe"	2018	— (Note: "Breathe" did not enter the Swedish Singellista Chart, but peaked at number 12 on the Swedish Heatseeker Chart.)	—	—	—	—	—	—	—	—		I'm a Dream
"Good in You"	2018	— (Note: "Good in You" did not enter the Swedish Singellista Chart, but peaked at number 10 on the Swedish Heatseeker Chart.)	—	— (Note: "Good in You" did not enter the Ultratop 50, but peaked at number 31 on the Flemish Ultratip chart.)	—	—	—	—	—	—		I'm a Dream
"Shores" (with Vargas & Lagola)	2019	61	—	—	—	—	—	—	—	—		Non-album single
"Sweet Life" (with Waterbaby)	2021	— (Note: "Sweet Life" did not enter the Swedish Singellista Chart, but peaked at number eight on the Swedish Heatseeker Chart.)	—	—	—	—	—	—	—	—		Sweet Life
"Blessed"	2022	—	—	—	—	—	—	—	—	—		Non-album singles
"Black Star"	2022	—	—	—	—	—	—	—	—	—		Non-album singles
"Swim Away"	2022	—	—	—	—	—	—	—	—	—		Non-album singles
"Suzuki"	2023	—	—	—	—	—	—	—	—	—		Non-album singles
"Yes" (featuring Namasenda)	2023	—	—	—	—	—	—	—	—	—		The One After Me
"Everything"	2023	—	—	—	—	—	—	—	—	—		The One After Me
"Fri till slut" (with Dina Ögon)	2023	48	—	—	—	—	—	—	—	—		Non-album singles
"Försent" (with Hov1)	2024	4	—	—	—	—	—	—	—	—		Non-album singles
"Sagolik"	2026	— (Note: "Sagolik" did not enter the Swedish Singellista Chart, but peaked at number eight on the Swedish Heatseeker Chart.)	—	—	—	—	—	—	—	—		Non-album singles
"—" denotes items which were not released in that country or failed to chart.

=== Other charted songs ===
Title	Year	Peak chart positions	Album
Title	Year	SWE	Album
"Never Get Used To"	2018	57	I'm a Dream
"Rom-Com" (with Hannes)	2021	— (Note: "Rom-Com" did not enter the Swedish Singellista Chart, but peaked at number three on the Swedish Heatseeker Chart.)	Sweet Life

=== Songwriting credits ===
Title	Year	Artist	Album
"No Shame"	2012	Sarah De Bono	No Shame
"Me & Your Ghost"	2013	Rosie Lowe	Right Thing
"Friend (Hard Times)"	2014	Galantis	Galantis
"Fri" (featuring Timbuktu)	2017	Oskar Linnros	Väntar på en ängel
"All or Nothing"	2018	Naughty Boy, Ray BLK, and Wyclef Jean	Non-album single
