= The Fault in Our Stars (disambiguation) =

The Fault in Our Stars is a 2012 novel by John Green.

The Fault in Our Stars may also refer to:

- The Fault in Our Stars (film), a 2014 adaptation of the novel
- The Fault in Our Stars (soundtrack), the 2014 soundtrack album to the film
- Naked City (TV series), episode 59 "The Fault in Our Stars," 1961.

== See also ==
- Dil Bechara, a 2020 Hindi adaptation of the novel
- William Shakespeare's Julius Caesar, from which the quote originates
