= Klappar och slag =

Studio album by Oskar Linnros
- Released: 29 May 2013
- Genre: Soul, Pop
- Label: Universal
- Producer: Oskar Linnros

Singles from Klappar och Slag
- 1. "Hur dom än" Released: 20 february 2013

Klappar och slag (Pats and Punches) is the second solo album of the Swedish singer Oskar Linnros, following Vilja bli (Wanting to Become). The album was released on 29 May 2013 in Sweden. The first single "Hur dom än" was released on 20 February 2013. The same day, he performed the song live on the Swedish equivalent to the Grammy Awards, Grammisgalan.

The album is mostly characterised by more songs being played in minor compared to his previous ones. The songs "Gå hem" and "Tunga moln" were predicted to become hits of the summer, just like "Från och med du" and "Genom eld" from his debut album Vilja bli. Even though there is a consensus among critics that it is a well polished album, many reviews mention a lack of playfulness and clarity.

== Track listing ==
No.	Title	Length
1.	"Kan jag få ett vittne?" (Can I Get a Witness?)	4:07
2.	"Gå hem" (Go Home)	3:53
3.	"Det är inte synd om dig" (Don't Pity You)	4:33
4.	"Hur dom än" (No Matter How They)	4:06
5.	"Stockholm"	3:26
6.	"För sent" (Too Late)	3:45
7.	"Från balkongen" (From the Balcony)	3:55
8.	"Tunga moln" (Heavy Clouds)	3:32
9.	"Klappar och slag" (Pats and Punches)	3:03
10.	"Plåster" (Plaster)	3:36
11.	"Piano"	1:04

== Charts ==
Chart (2013)	Peak position
Swedish Albums Chart	3
