= Gubben i lådan =

Single by Daniel Adams-Ray

from the album Svart, vitt och allt däremellan
- Language: Swedish
- Released: 1 October 2010
- Length: 3:50
- Label: Sweden Music
- Songwriters: Daniel Adams-Ray, Carl Wikström Ask
- Producers: Daniel Adams-Ray, Carl Wikström Ask

Daniel Adams-Ray singles chronology
"Dum av dig" (2010)	"Gubben i lådan" (2010)	"Lilla lady" (2011)

"Gubben i lådan" is a song by Swedish artist Daniel Adams-Ray from his 2010 debut album, Svart, vitt och allt däremellan. It was released as a single on Sweden Music and reached the top of the Sverigetopplistan, the official Swedish Singles Chart staying for 4 weeks at #1. It was the second single from the album following his debut single "Dum av dig". "Gubben i lådan" was written and produced by Adams-Ray himself and songwriter Carl Wikström Ask.

Adams-Ray had stopped his musical career in 2006. In the summer 2009, he recorded a song for a fashion show and then felt "a desire" to come back to music again. The song which mean "Jack-in-the-box" in Swedish is about a relation where he took loyalty a bit too far. So when the relationship collapsed, he took that he had lost part of himself in it.

== Charts ==
The song debuted at #15 at the Swedish Singles Chart on October 8, 2010 making it to the top of the charts on October 29, 2010, taking over from former bandmate Oskar Linnros other hit "Från och med du". It stayed at #1 for 4 weeks before being overtaken by the September massive hit "Mikrofonkåt".

"Gubben i lådan" was certified platinum by the Swedish Recording Industry Association with certified sales of 20,000 copies until 20 December 2010. The song also reached #2 on DigiListan, Sweden's top list of most downloaded songs.

=== Weekly charts ===
Chart (2010)	Peak position
Sweden (Sverigetopplistan)	1
Sweden (DigiListan)	2

=== Year-end charts ===
Chart (2010)	Position
Sweden (Sverigetopplistan)	1
Chart (2011)	Position
Sweden (Sverigetopplistan)	13
