= Ansiktet =

Ansiktet may refer to:

- Ansiktet, the Swedish title of a 1958 film by Ingmar Bergman known as The Magician
- Ansiktet (band), Swedish singing duo
