= Äckligt =

Single by Ansiktet
- Released: 20 December 2011
- Recorded: 2011
- Genre: Pop
- Length: 4:02
- Label: Universal Music

Ansiktet singles chronology
"X" (2011)	"Äckligt" (2011)	"För Stor" (2012)

"Äckligt" (lit. "Disgusting") is a single by Swedish singing R&B duo Ansiktet, from their debut studio album #DENNYARNBMANNEN. It was released in Sweden as a digital download on 20 December 2011. The song has topped the Swedish Singles Chart.

== Music video ==
A music video to accompany the release of "Äckligt" was first released onto YouTube on 2 January 2012 at a total length of four minutes and five seconds.

== Track listing ==
Digital download

1. "Äckligt" - 4:02
2. "Äckligt" (Instrumental) - 4:09

== Charts ==
=== Weekly charts and certifications ===
Chart (2012)	Peak position	Certification
Sweden (Sverigetopplistan)	1	2× platinum

=== Year-end charts ===
Chart (2012)	Position
Sweden (Sverigetopplistan)	10

== Release history ==
Region	Date	Format	Label
Sweden	20 December 2011	Digital Download	Universal Music
