= Ansiktet (band) =

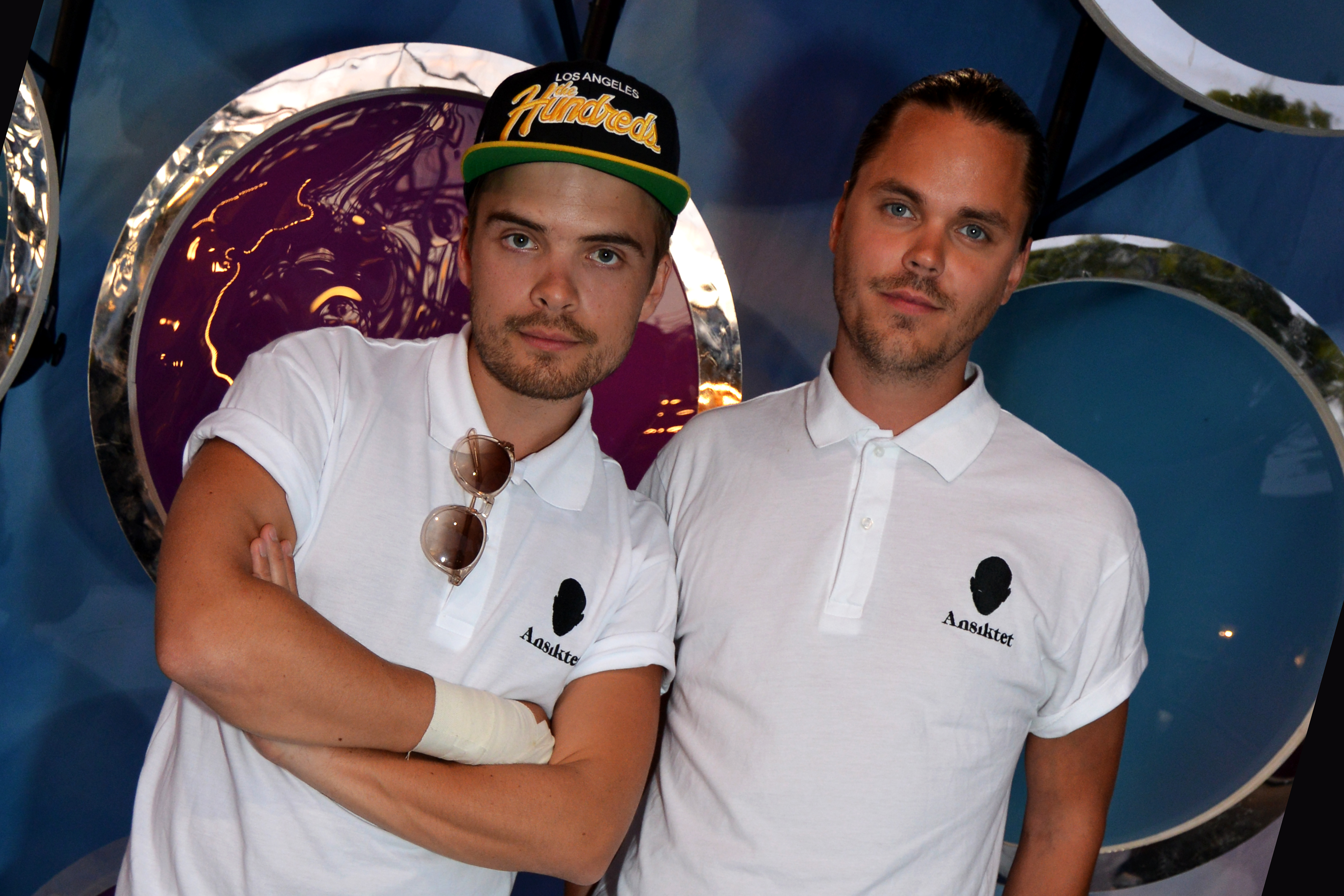

Background information
- Origin: Sweden
- Genres: Contemporary R&B
- Years active: 2011–present
- Members: Herbert Munkhammar; Erik Nordström

Ansiktet (lit. "The Face") is a Swedish duo that performs R&B. They are most notable for their singles "X", released in April 2011 and "Äckligt" ("Disgusting"), which was released in December the same year.

== Members ==
The band is made up of:

- Erik Nordström (born in Uppsala) is also part of the duo Lilla Sällskapet, a contemporary club act with 1980s New Wave influences signed with Sony and made up of him on vocals and Mats Norman as producer. Well-known Lilla Sällskapet songs include "Genova" and "Morgonen efter"
- Herbert Munkhammar (born in Uppsala in 1985) is also known as rapper Afasi. As such, between 2002 and 2008, he was part of the Swedish rap duo Afasi & Filthy with him as rapper and Magnus Lidehäll (known as Filthy) as producer. They had a string of albums and singles with "1990 Nånting" featuring Snook being the most famous. Munkhammar later on became a member of the formation Maskinen. The group released their debut album Boys II Men in 2009 and are about to release their second album called Framgång & Efterfrågan in 2012.

== Music career ==
Ansiktet released their debut single "X" on 20 April 2011. "Äckligt" was released as the duo's second single on 20 December 2011. The single has topped the Swedish Singles Chart.

In September 2012, Ansiktet released their third single, "För Stor" ("Too Big").

In February 2013, they released their fourth single, titled "Låtsas Som Inget Hänt" ("Pretend Like Nothing Has Happened").

== Discography ==
=== Albums ===
Year	Title	Peak chart positions	Certification
Year	Title	SWE	Certification
2013	#DENNYARNBMANNEN	31	

=== Singles ===
Year	Title	Peak chart positions	Certification	Album
Year	Title	SWE	Certification	Album
2011	"X"	—		TBA
2011	"Äckligt"	1	4× platinum	TBA
2012	"För stor"	—		TBA
2013	"Låtsas som inget hänt"	53		TBA
