= Vilja Bli =

Studio album by Oskar Linnros
- Released: June 9, 2010
- Genre: Soul; pop
- Length: 34:28
- Label: Universal
- Producer: Oskar Linnros

Singles from Vilja bli
- 1. "Genom eld" Released: January 1, 2010; 2. "Ack, Sundbyberg" Released: January 28, 2010; 3. "Från och med Du" Released: May 10, 2010; 4. "25" Released: February 14, 2011

Vilja Bli (Wanting to Become) is the debut studio album by Swedish singer Oskar Linnros after leaving the group Snook. The album was released on June 9, 2010, in Sweden. So far four singles have been released, "Ack, Sundbyberg", "Från och med Du", "25" and "Genom eld". The entire album was written, played and produced by Oskar Linnros.

== Reception ==
Professional ratings
Review scores
Source	Rating
Aftonbladet	link
Dagens Nyheter	link
Göteborgs-Posten	link
Sydsvenskan	link
Expressen	link

Initial response to Vilja bli was positive. The album received positive reviews and music journalist Jan Gradvall wrote that the album "is one of the most complete and hit-filled Swedish debut albums I have heard". He also compared Linnros' songwriting abilities to those of Tomas Ledin, Magnus Uggla and Björn Skifs, artists that all were popular in Scandinavia during the late 80s and early 90s. At the Swedish website Kritiker.se, similar to Metacritic, the album received an average score of 3,7 out of 5 possible, based on 24 reviews. On September 1, 2010, Linnros won two Rockbjörnen awards, one for the album featured song "Från och med Du" in the category "Swedish Song of the Year", and one in the category "Breakthrough of the Year".

== Music ==
The sound of the album was compared to Swedish artists such as Mauro Scocco, Orup and Peter LeMarc. In fact, Linnros mentions Al Green as an influence, taking a musical aim at the mid-70s with happy melodies and lyrics about agonizing relationships. Unhappiness is pointed out as the consistent theme of the album. Other musical influences are Hall & Oates, Led Zeppelin and soul music in general. Linnros also mentions heavy Swedish drama films as an inspiration to the album, including the works of the Swedish director Björn Runge.

== Album cover ==
The album cover features Linnros sitting down topless covered in black paint. Linnros himself said that they were looking for album cover ideas for almost a year to find the right expression and that he chose to be topless on the cover because it said most about the music and because it felt honest and personal. The color black was chosen simply because it was neat. He also said that there were at least as much work preparing all the visuals surrounding the album in the form of artwork, trailers and preparing for live performances as it had been with the music.

== Track listing ==
All tracks written by Oskar Linnros, except for "Genom eld", which was co-written by Magnus Lidehäll and Robert Elovsson, and "Från och med Du", which was co-written by Christian Olsson.

No.	Title	Length
1.	"Genom eld" (Through Fire)	4:21
2.	"25"	3:48
3.	"Från och med du" (From You On)	3:13
4.	"Ballad från en loftsäng" (Ballad from a Loft Bed)	1:12
5.	"Debut"	4:56
6.	"Kaffe/Cigg" (Coffee/Cigs)	0:59
7.	"Din mamma" (Your Mom)	4:26
8.	"Växande molnighet" (Growing Cloudiness)	0:37
9.	"Annie Hall"	2:52
10.	"Ack, Sundbyberg" (Alas, Sundbyberg)	3:55
11.	"Ulla och Åke" (Ulla and Åke)	3:58

== Charts and certifications ==
=== Weekly charts ===
Chart (2008–2010)	Peak position
Swedish Albums Chart	2

=== Year-end charts ===
Chart	Year	Position
Swedish Albums (Sverigetopplistan)	2022	100
Swedish Albums (Sverigetopplistan)	2025	74

=== Certifications ===
Country	Certification	Provider
Sweden	Platinum	GLF
