= The Bridge (Concept of a Culture) =

Studio album by Grandmaster Flash
- Released: February 24, 2009
- Genre: Hip hop
- Length: 62:59
- Label: Strut Records; STRUT039CD/LP
- Producer: Grandmaster Flash

Grandmaster Flash chronology
The Essential Grandmaster Flash (2007)	The Bridge (Concept of a Culture) (2009)	King of the Streets (2010)

Professional ratings
Aggregate scores
Source	Rating
Metacritic	50/100
Review scores
Source	Rating
AllMusic	3.5/5 stars
BBC Music	(mixed)
The Observer	(mixed)
Okayplayer	(68/100)
Pitchfork	(3.5/10)
RapReviews	7/10 stars
Spin	2.5/5 stars

The Bridge (Concept of a Culture) is the seventh studio album by American hip hop recording artist Grandmaster Flash, his first studio album since 1998's Flash is Back. The album was released on February 24, 2009 under Strut Records. The album features guest appearances from rappers Q-Tip, Jumz, Afasi, Busta Rhymes, MC Supernatural, Snoop Dogg, Big Daddy Kane, Kase-O and Grandmaster Caz. The production was primarily handled by Grandmaster Flash himself.

Three different CD versions were released. These were the 'clean' and 'explicit content' standard 19 track editions, and a 'Bonus Edition' (STRUT039CDX) featuring 2 exclusive remixes (*). A 2LP vinyl edition was also produced in the US.

== Track listing ==
The Bridge (Concept of a Culture) – Standard edition
No.	Title	Length
1.	"Welcome"	1:00
2.	"Shine All Day" (featuring Jumz, Kel Spencer & Q-Tip)	3:05
3.	"We Speak Hip Hop" (featuring Abass, Afasi, KRS-One, Kase-O & Maccho)	3:16
4.	"Here Comes My DJ" (featuring DJ Kool & DJ Demo)	3:00
5.	"Bounce Back" (featuring Busta Rhymes)	2:38
6.	"Swagger" (featuring Red Café, Snoop Dogg & Lynda Carter)	3:33
7.	"What If" (featuring KRS-One)	4:06
8.	"Unanswered"	0:26
9.	"Tribute To The Breakdancer" (featuring MC Supernatural)	3:20
10.	"Grown & Sexy" (featuring Mr. Cheeks)	3:17
11.	"When I Get There" (featuring Big Daddy Kane & Hedonis Da Amazon)	3:47
12.	"Connection"	0:12
13.	"I Got Sumthin' To Say" (featuring Lordikim, Jay-Flo & Almighty Thor)	3:22
14.	"Can I Take You Higher" (featuring Mr. Cheeks, Grandmaster Caz & Tito)	3:29
15.	"Unpredictable" (featuring Big Daddy Kane & Syndee)	3:37
16.	"Those Chix" (featuring Byata, Princess Superstar, Hedonis Da Amazon & Syndee)	2:56
17.	"Bronx Bombers" (featuring Almighty Thor, Lordikim & Mann Child)	3:50
18.	"Zuka The Sound"	2:31
19.	"Oh Man" (featuring Syndee & Natacha Atlas)	4:35

The Bridge (Concept of a Culture) – Bonus edition
No.	Title	Length
20.	"Swagger" (Grandmaster Flash Street Leak Remix) (featuring Red Café, Snoop Dogg & Lynda Carter)	3:44
21.	"Shine All Day" (Sam Webster Remix) (featuring Jumz, Kel Spencer & Q-Tip)	3:46
