= Frej Larsson =

Swedish musician and rapper (born 1983)

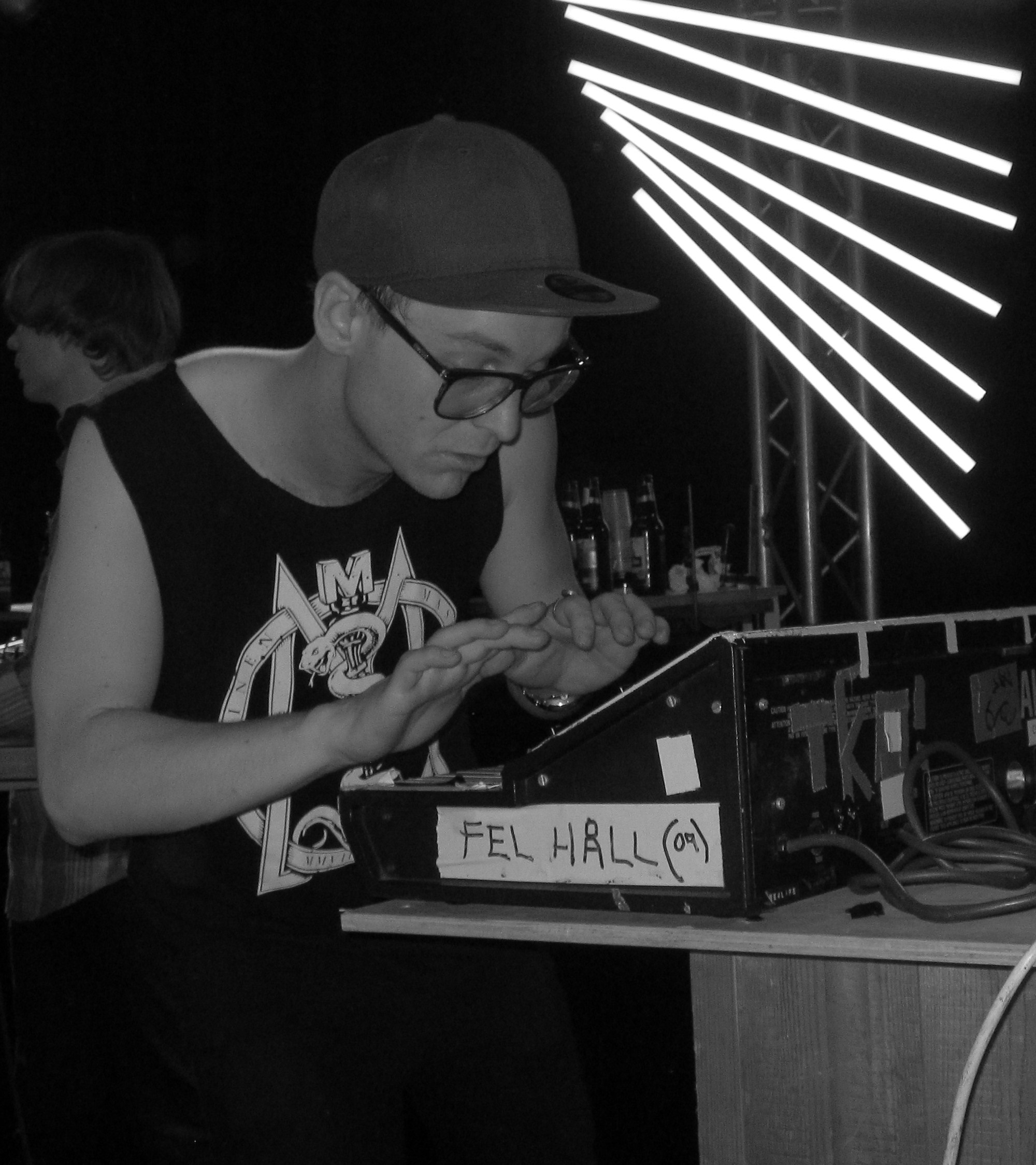

Background information
- Born: 9 September 1983 (age 41); Ronneby, Sweden
- Genres: electronica, alternative hip hop

Frej Larsson (born 9 September 1983 in Ronneby, Sweden) is a Swedish musician and rapper. He is a member of Slagsmålsklubben, Maskinen and Far & Son.

Frej Larsson joined Slagsmålsklubben in 2002, after he met them at the 2002 Emmabodafestivalen.
