= Herbert Munkhammar =

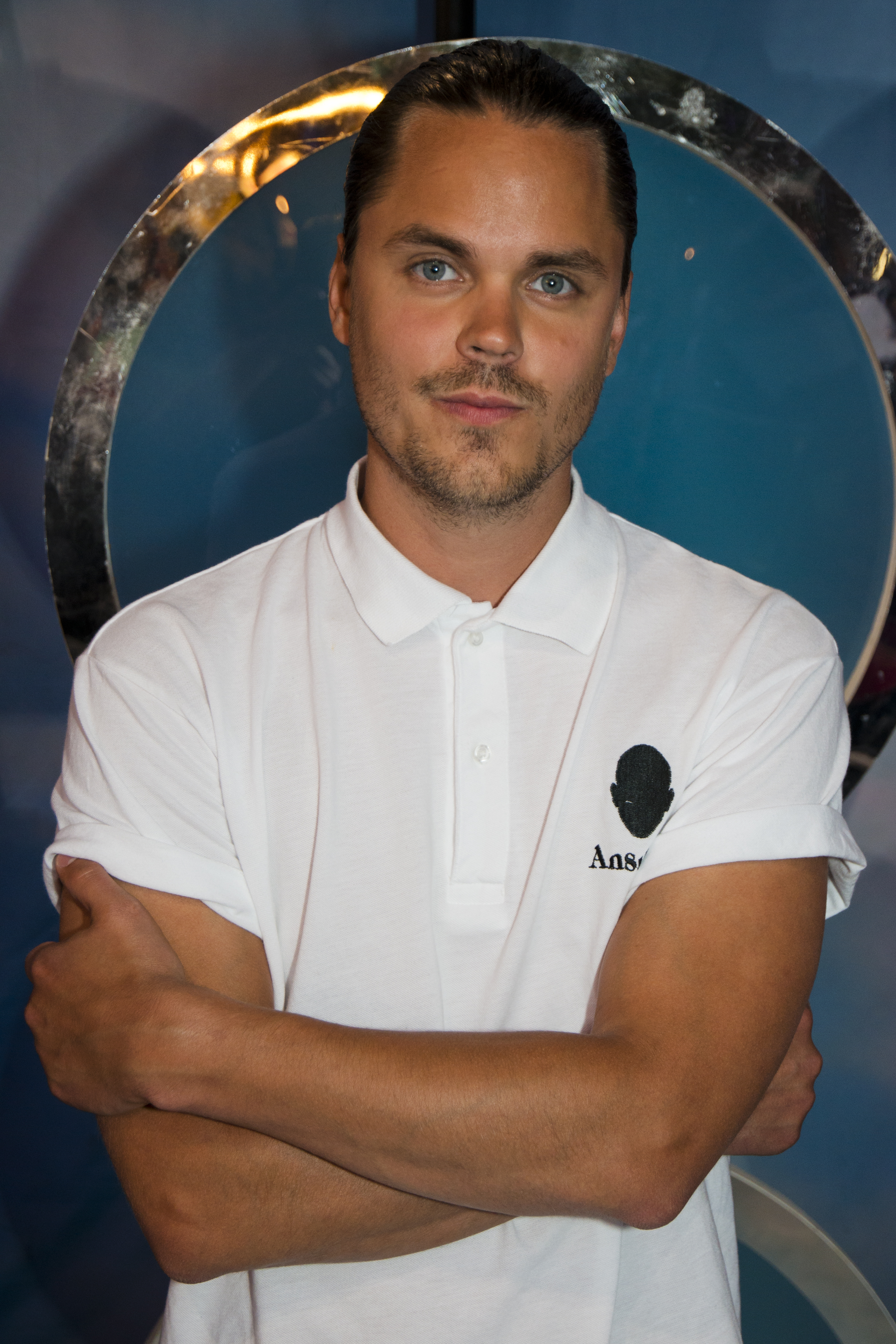
- Munkhammar at Sommarkrysset 2013 on Gröna Lund in Stockholm (Sweden)

Background information
- Also known as: Afasi
- Born: 15 March 1985 (age 41); Uppsala, Sweden
- Genres: Hip hop, R&B
- Occupations: Singer, songwriter
- Instrument: Vocals
- Years active: 2002–present
- Member of: Ansiktet
- Formerly of: Afasi & Filthy; Maskinen

Herbert "Afasi" Munkhammar also known as Afasi (born 15 March 1985 in Uppsala, Sweden) is a Swedish hip hop artist, rapper and singer and part of various formations like Afasi & Filthy (2002–2009), Maskinen (2009-presently) and part of the duo Ansiktet. Afasi was also featured as a guest singer on the Grandmaster Flash album The Bridge (Concept of a Culture) on the song "We Speak Hip Hop".

== In Afasi and Filthy ==
Herbert Munkhammar, born in Uppsala then moved to Malmo and eventually Stockholm. Herbert Munkhammar and his classmate Magnus Lidehäll started performing at their school in Uppsala. In 2002 they formed Afasi & Filthy where Munkhammar was the vocalist known as Afasi and Lidehäll known as Filthy. The duo caught the attention of indie label/website Streetzone where they released the EP 1990 Nånting. The title track, that included a collaboration from Snook was released on radio in Spring/Summer 2003 charted in Sweden. Based on this radio success, the duo signed a contract with BMG, releasing the single "Bomfalleralla". But after disagreements, they broke the contract with BMG in Spring 2005 preferring to work independently. Their first single on their own label was "Le Parkour" followed by EP Jag kunde inte bry mig mindre. Albums Skruvat & choppat av Afasi in 2006 and Hotell Stress were released, the latter in 2 separate volumes in 2006 and 2007. Flacken is the band's critically acclaimed final album under the duo name. It brought a Grammy to the duo as "Best Dance/Hiphop/Soul" in January 2009.

== In Maskinen ==
Herbert Munkhammar decided to join Maskinen (Swedish for The Machine) alongside Frej Larsson, a former member from band Slagsmålsklubben and Oskar Linnros (known as Kihlen Linnros), a member of band Snook. The band had a successful debut and album Boys II Men (2009), and a number of singles. Oskar Linnros left the band after the release of the single "Segertåget". Their second album release, Framgång & Efterfrågan (Swedish for 'Success & Demand') followed in 2012. Maskinen genre of music is alternative Electro/Hip Hop with influences from Baile Funk.

== In Ansiktet ==
In 2010, Herbert Munkhammar (Afasi) became, alongside Erik Nordström (born in Uppsala) and formerly part of a duo Lilla Sällskapet, to form the new singing duo Ansiktet. They are well known for their 2011 single "X" and the charting single "Äckligt" in 2012.

== Discography ==
=== Albums, EPs ===
in Afasi & Filthy

- 2002: Snus, Porr och Brännvin
- 2003: 1990 Nånting EP
- 2005: Jag kunde inte bry mig mindre EP
- 2006: Hotell Stress
- 2006: Skruvat & choppat av Afasi
- 2006: Hotell Stress vol. 2
- 2008: Fläcken

in Maskinen

- 2009: Boys II Men
- 2012: Framgång & Efterfrågan

in Ansiktet

- 2013: "#DENNYARNBMANNEN"
- 2014: "Fyra våningar upp"

=== Singles ===
in Afasi & Filthy

- 2003: "1990 nånting" feat. Snook
- 2004: "Bomfalleralla"
- 2005: "Le parkour"
- 2006: "Hej hej"
- 2006: "Eller hur!?"
- 2007: "Fredag hela månan"
- 2008: "Glider"
- 2008: "Jobb"
- 2008: "Sverigetrotters"

in Maskinen

- 2007: "Alla som inte dansar"
- 2008: "Segertåget"
- 2009: "Pengar"
- 2009: "Dansa med vapen"
- 2011: "Fade into Darkness"
- 2011: "Krossa alla fönster"

in Ansiktet

- 2011: "X"
- 2012: "Äckligt"
- 2012: "För stor"
- 2013: "Låtsas som inget hänt"

==== Appearances ====
- 2009: "We Speak Hip Hop", a track in Grandmaster Flash album The Bridge (Concept of a Culture)
