= Sagan om konungens årsinkomst =

Studio album by Slagsmålsklubben
- Released: 15 October 2004
- Genre: Electro, synthpop
- Length: 45:08
- Label: Djur And Mir
- Producer: Slagsmålsklubben

Slagsmålsklubben chronology
Den svenske disco (2003)	Sagan om konungens årsinkomst (2004)	Boss for Leader (2007)

Sagan om konungens årsinkomst, Swedish for "The Saga of the King's Annual Income", is the second full-length album by the Swedish synthpop group Slagsmålsklubben. The name is a pun on the Swedish name for The Return of the King, 'Sagan om konungens återkomst' (The Tale of the King's Return), with the word for 'return' replaced with the similar word årsinkomst meaning 'annual income' (The Tale of the King's Annual Income). The track list features the Swedish names, translated to English.

== Track listing ==
1. "Terror Flynn Ok Ok" – 3:48
2. "Erd ist froh" – 3:12 (Earth Is Good)
3. "Smart drag Mr. Christer" – 2:25 (Smart Move, Mr. Christer)
4. "Djur Don't Love MIR Yet" – 4:12
5. "Kom igen kommissarien" – 3:25 (Come On Officer)
6. "Bib" – 5:03
7. "Rakade ögonbryn skall det vara" – 2:38 (Shaved Eyebrows For The Win)
8. "Grovhuggen kepsgubbe" – 4:17 (Roughly Cut Cap Guy)
9. "Spring för livet gottegris" – 2:40 (Run For Your Life, Sweet Tooth)
10. "I hennes majestäts hemliga hatt" – 3:23 (In Her Majesty's Secret Hat)
11. "Alfons Dolphins" – 2:52
12. "1888 Franklin" – 3:12
13. "His Morning Promenade" – 3:53
