= Boss for Leader =

Studio album by Slagsmålsklubben
- Released: 2007
- Genre: Electro, synthpop
- Length: 55:14
- Label: EMI
- Producer: Slagsmålsklubben

Slagsmålsklubben chronology
Sagan om konungens årsinkomst (2004)	Boss for Leader (2007)	The Garage (2012)

Boss for Leader is the third full-length studio album by the Swedish synthpop group Slagsmålsklubben, released in 2007 by EMI. It is the follow-up to the 2004 album Sagan om konungens årsinkomst.

== Track listing ==
1. "Hänt" – 4:06 (Happened)
2. "Sponsored by Destiny" – 6:01 (The song "Sponsored by Destiny" ends at minute 5:10. After 5 seconds of silence (5:10 - 5:15) begins a hidden track).
3. "Speedboats" – 3:55
4. "The World Welcomes Fame" – 5:29
5. "Malmö Beach Night Party" – 4:06
6. "Dysparennia" – 3:52
7. "Spanska Förhoppningar" – 3:14 (Spanish Expectations)
8. "Han Som Tuggar Med Öppen Mun Dör" – 4:50 (He Who Chews with His Mouth Open Dies)
9. "Borg of Hate" – 5:45 (Castle of Hate)
10. "Pälsmästaren" – 13:38 (The Fur Master)
11. "Vidrige Ajjabajja" – 2:55 (Repulsing Ajjabajja; special edition bonus track)
