= Jumz =

American rapper

JUMZ
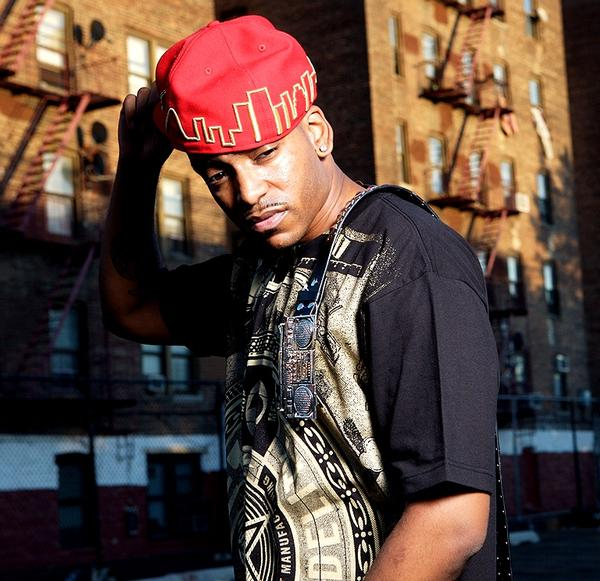

Background information
- Born: Rafael Ramon; March 14, 1984 (age 42)
- Origin: Washington Heights, Manhattan
- Occupation: Rapper
- Years active: 2003 -present
- Website: http://www.jumz.com

Rafael Ramon (born March 14, 1984) better known by his stage name JUMZ is an American rapper. He is of Dominican descent, hailing from Washington Heights, Manhattan.

== Early life ==
He was raised in the predominantly Dominican section of Manhattan, Washington Heights and went to Norman Thomas H.S.

== Career ==
In 2006, JUMZ debuted his first LP "SIGN JUMZ" thru his imprint Paid It In Pain which was distributed independently. The album underperformed at the mainstream level due to lack of promotions but the following single "Satisfy" became one of JUMZ's biggest hits to date.

In December 2007, JUMZ announced his first ever European Tour, My Head Is Swollen Tour. At his return from Europe, he unveiled his new video "Paid It In Pain" which was shot in Paris, France and has garnered him accolades from music industry heads. As a result, SESAC, one of the three leading performance rights organizations in the US, has offered JUMZ a publishing deal.

Also, he recently was featured by celebrity portraiture photographer Kelly Kline in her portfolio which include music and sports entertainment's biggest names such as Reggie Bush, T.I., Rev Run, LeBron James, and Amar'e Stoudemire among others.

== Discography ==
Mixtapes Albums

- Independent's Day (Big White Tee Music) (2012)
- Stonewater (2010)
- Back From 95 (2008)
- Sign JUMZ (2006)

Year	Title	Chart Positions				Album
Year	Title	US Hot 100	US R&B/Hip-Hop	UK Singles Chart	EUR Top 50	Album
2009	"Shine All Day" featuring Q-Tip The Abstract	-	-	-	-	The Bridge
2007	"Satisfy"	-	-	-	-	Sign Jumz
2007	Paid It In Pain "	-	-	-	-	Sign Jumz

Mixtapes Appearances

- 2011 Get Your Buzz Up Vol. 3
- 2010 DJ Dyber Talk's Cheap
- 2010 DJ N.O. For The Streets Vol.2
- 2009 East Coast Bad Boys
- 2008: DJ Guttaman presents KILL TAPEZ, volume3
- 2008: DJ Guttaman & Phase 5 present F*CK ya label, volume 1

== Album appearances ==
Year	Title	Artist	Album
2009	"Shine All Day" (featuring Q-Tip, & Kel Spencer)	Grandmaster Flash	The Bridge - Concept of a Culture
