= Maskinen =

Swedish musical duo

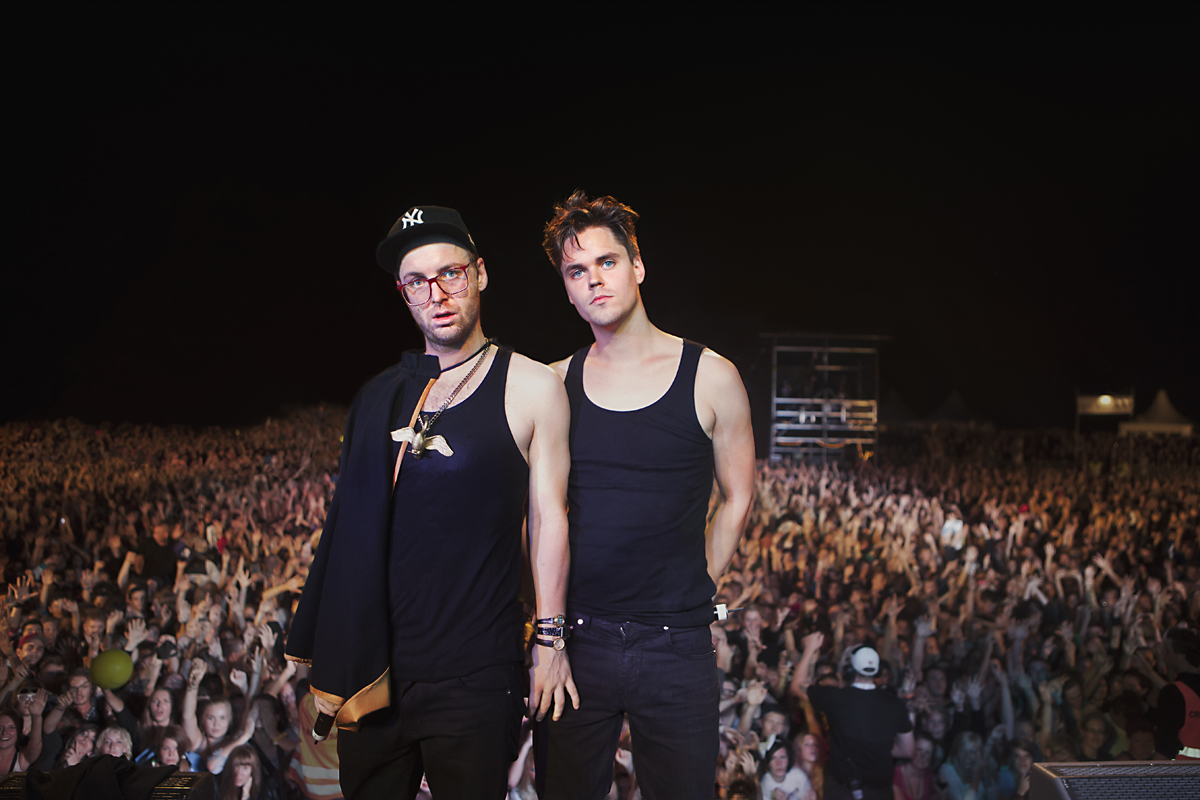
- Maskinen 2011 - Frej & Afasi

Background information
- Origin: Sweden
- Genres: Electro, hip hop
- Years active: 2007–2015
- Labels: P.O.P.E Records
- Members: Herbert Munkhammar (Afasi); Frej Larsson; Mats Norman (DJ/Producer)
- Past members: Oskar "Kihlen" Linnros; Magnus "Filthy" Lidehäll

Maskinen (Swedish: [maˈɧǐːnɛn], "The Machine") is a Swedish music group consisting of the rapper Herbert Munkhammar who was earlier part of the duo Afasi & Filthy and Frej Larsson, also a member of the band Slagsmålsklubben and duo Far & Son. Oskar "Kihlen" Linnros, formerly a member of the band Snook, was a member of Maskinen but left after the release of the single "Segertåget".

Maskinen's music style is alternative electro/hip hop with influences from baile funk. The band has released three albums, Boys II Men, Framgång & Efterfrågan (Swedish for 'Success & Demand')) and Stora Fötter Stora Skor ("Big Feet Big Shoes").

== Members ==
Current members

- Frej Larsson (from band Slagsmålsklubben)
- Herbert "Afasi" Munkhammar (from duo Afasi & Filthy)
- Mats Norman (from duo Lilla Sällskapet)

Former members

- Oskar "Kihlen" Linnros (from band Snook)
- Magnus "Filthy" Lidehäll (from duo Afasi & Filthy)

== Discography ==
=== Albums ===
Year	Album	Peak	Certification
Year	Album	SWE	Certification
2009	Boys II Men	40	
2012	Framgång & Efterfrågan	25	
2015	Stora Fötter Stora Skor	13	

=== Singles ===
Year	Song	Peak	Certification	Album
Year	Song	SWE	Certification	Album
2007	"Alla som inte dansar"	25		Boys II Men
2008	"Segertåget"	–		Boys II Men
2009	"Pengar"	–		Boys II Men
2009	"Dansa med vapen"	49		Boys II Men
2011	"Krossa Alla Fönster"	6		Framgång & Efterfrågan
2012	"Liv och död"	40		Framgång & Efterfrågan
2013	"Limousin" (Movits! & Maskinen)	34		Huvudet Bland Molnen
