= Indians (musician) =

Indians (Søren Løkke Juul)
- Born: Søren Løkke Juul; Denmark
- Genres: Indie music
- Occupations: Singer, songwriter, musician
- Instruments: Vocals, keyboards, guitar
- Years active: 2003 – present
- Labels: 4AD
- Website: 4ad.com/artists/indians

Indians is the moniker and alter ego of Danish singer-songwriter and musician Søren Løkke Juul signed to 4AD record label. In concerts, he is accompanied by some musicians also collectively known as Indians. Village Voice has dubbed Søren Løkke Juul / Indians as "Denmark's Bon Iver".

Performing his first solo show with the moniker Indians in February 2012, he self-released his debut single on 7" a few months later. He also extensively toured Europe and North America with the likes of Other Lives, Beirut, Perfume Genius, Phosphorescent and Daughter. He was eventually signed to British well-known indie record label 4AD with his debut album Somewhere Else released in Europe on 28 January 2013 and in North America the following day. The album charted in his home country in February 2013. His song "Oblivion" appeared on the soundtrack of the film The Fault in Our Stars.

== Discography ==
=== Albums ===
Title and details	Year	Peak position	Certification	Track listing
Title and details	Year	DAN	Certification	Track listing
Somewhere Else: Release date: 28 January 2013 (Europe); 29 January 2013 (North America); Record label: 4AD; Format: CD	2013	38		1. "New" (4:41); 2. "Bird" (5:02); 3. "I Am Haunted" (3:26); 4. "Magic Kids" (3:02); 5. "Lips Lips Lips" (5:07); 6. "Reality Sublime" (4:42); 7. "Cakelakers" (3:50); 8. "La Femme" (3:40); 9. "Melt" (5:47); 10. "Somewhere Else" (5:31)

=== Singles ===
- 2012: "I Am Haunted"
