= Den svenske disco =

Studio album by Slagsmålsklubben
- Released: 10 June 2003
- Recorded: Norrköping 2001–2003
- Genre: Electro, pop
- Length: 36:10
- Label: Beat That! Records
- Producer: Slagsmålsklubben

Slagsmålsklubben chronology
Den svenske disco (2003)	Sagan om konungens årsinkomst (2004)

Den svenske disco is the first full-length release by the synthpop group Slagsmålsklubben. The track list features the Swedish names as well as the names translated to English.

== Track listing ==
1. "Övningsköra" – 3:19 (Driving Practice)
2. "Tjeckien, Slovakien och tillbaks igen" – 4:16 (The Czech Republic, Slovakia and Back Again)
3. "Wellington Sears" – 3:34
4. "Vi och Olle" – 2:34 (We and Olle)
5. "Kinematografen" – 1:29 (The Cinematograph)
6. "Svenska tennis" – 2:10 (The Swedish Tennis)
7. "Hit Me Hard" – 2:54
8. "Rörmokarhäng" – 3:17 (Plumber's Sag)
9. "USSR" – 3:35
10. "SMK hittar munspelet" – 3:15 (SMK Finds the Harmonica)
11. "I Don't Miss You Rävbur" – 2:36 (I Don't Miss You Fox Cage)
12. "Stora farliga rymdprojektet går åt pipan" – 3:19 (The Big Dangerous Space Project Goes Awry)
