= All of the Stars =

Song by Ed Sheeran

from the album The Fault in Our Stars (Music from the Motion Picture) and x (Deluxe physical edition)
- Released: 9 May 2014
- Recorded: 2014
- Length: 3:54
- Label: Atlantic
- Songwriters: Ed Sheeran; Johnny McDaid
- Producer: Johnny McDaid

Music video
- "All of the Stars" on YouTube

"All of the Stars" is a song by English singer-songwriter Ed Sheeran. It is featured over the credits in the 2014 film The Fault in Our Stars and is the first track of the soundtrack album, The Fault in Our Stars (Music from the Motion Picture). It is also a bonus track on the physical deluxe edition of Sheeran's second studio album x (2014).

Sheeran said that the song was "inspired by the whole movie, just wanting to be sad, yet euphoric and lift people a little bit." The film, about a teenager dying of cancer who falls in love with another teen cancer patient, deals with the importance of love in the face of death.

In 2014, Sheeran would join singer Christina Grimmie for a famous duet of the song on the season 6 finale of The Voice.

== Music video ==
The music video was premiered on YouTube on 9 May 2014. The video does not feature any new footage from the movie, but it does feature fan-submitted messages of encouragement such as "Everything is beautiful" and "You are not a burden".

== Covers ==
Jackie Evancho released a single and corresponding video covering the song in August 2015.

== Charts ==
Chart (2014)	Peak position
Canada Hot 100 (Billboard)	67
France (SNEP)	130
Germany (GfK)	66
Ireland (IRMA)	29
Scottish Singles Sales (Official Charts)	31
UK Singles (Official Charts)	46
US Bubbling Under Hot 100 (Billboard)	13
US Digital Song Sales (Billboard)	49

== Certifications ==
Region	Certification	Certified units/sales
Canada (Music Canada)	Platinum	80,000^{‡}
New Zealand (RMNZ)	Gold	15,000^{‡}
United Kingdom (BPI)	Gold	400,000^{‡}
United States (RIAA)	Platinum	1,000,000^{‡}
^{‡} Sales+streaming figures based on certification alone.
