= Slagsmålsklubben =

Swedish electronic music group

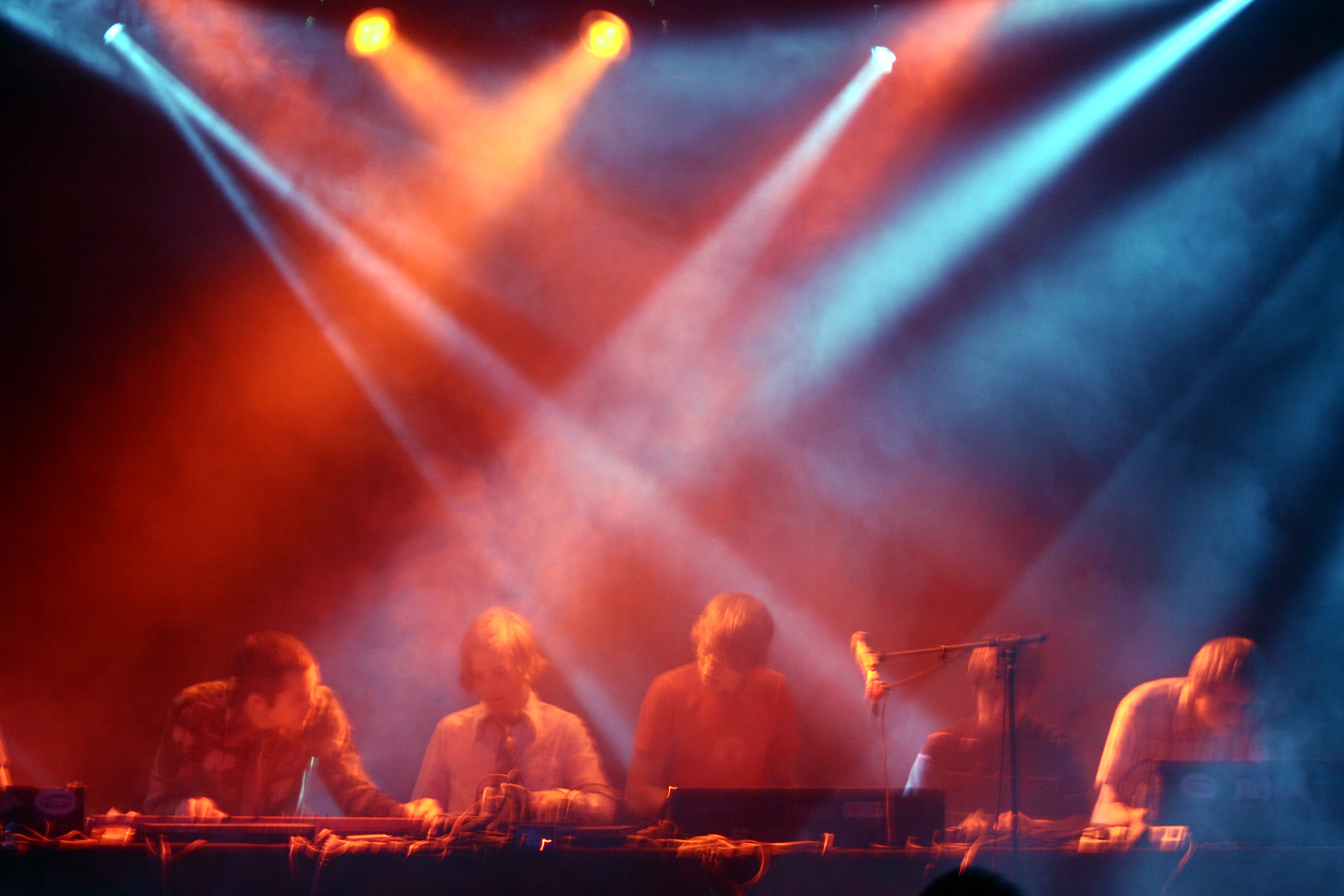
- Slagsmålsklubben performing live at Debaser Medis in Stockholm on 16 September 2006

Background information
- Origin: Norrköping, Östergötland, Sweden
- Genres: Synthpop, bitpop, chiptune
- Years active: 2000–2013
- Labels: Djur and Mir, Beat That!, Dolores, EMI
- Members: Hannes Stenström; Joni Mälkki; Björn Anders Nilsson; Kim Nilsson; Joakim "Beebop" Nybom; Frej Larsson
- Website: smk.just.nu

Slagsmålsklubben (Swedish pronunciation: [ˈslâksmoːlsˌklɵbːɛn]; often abbreviated as SMK) was a Swedish electronic music group from Norrköping, Östergötland. The group's name is a comically literal Swedish translation of the title of the novel and film Fight Club by Chuck Palahniuk. They have released five studio albums so far. Along with their side projects 50 Hertz and Häxor och porr (Witches and Porn), they were featured on Björk's 2005 remix album Army of Me: Remixes and Covers.

SMK's members are Björn Anders Nilsson, Hannes Stenström, Joakim "Beebop" Nybom, Joni Mälkki, Kim Nilsson and Frej Larsson. The members of the band have many side projects, such as 50 Hertz, which features many of SMK's members, Din Stalker, Hannes' solo project, and Offerprästers orkester, one of Frej's solo projects.

In 2005, the entire band moved to Berlin. As of 2011, all members have returned to Stockholm, and now share a mansion together with an on-site recording studio where they have recorded and mastered their fourth studio album, The Garage.

== History ==
Slagsmålsklubben was formed on 2 November 2000 in Norrköping, Sweden by Joakim "Beebop" Nybom, Björn Anders Nilsson and Joni Mälkki, former members of the punk rock band The Solbrillers.

The idea of forming a synthpop band occurred to them at a band practice with The Solbrillers. Since the singer of the band wouldn't show up, they decided to plug in Joni's old synthesizer into his guitar amplifier. The three recorded a few songs, which eventually led to the forming of SMK.

Hannes Stenström joined the band one year later, in 2001, because he had good synthesizers. Frej Larsson joined the band in 2003 after they had made the 7" Hyreshusklossar together and in 2004 Kim Nilsson joined the band, finalizing their current line-up.

== Discography ==
=== Studio albums ===
- Den svenske disco (2003)
- Sagan om konungens årsinkomst (2004)
- Boss for Leader (2007)
- The Garage (2012)

=== EPs ===
- "Hit Me Hard" (2004)
- "Den Officiella Os-Låten" (2004)
- "His Morning Promenade" (2005)
- "Malmö Beach Night Party" (2007)
- "Brutal Weapons" (2009)
- "Jake Blood" (2012)
- "Snälla TV Plz" (2012)

=== Other albums ===
- Fest I Valen
- Live in Rødby
- LittleBigPlanet Vita Soundtrack

=== Appearances ===
Album	Song	Release date
Kitsuné Maison Compilation 8	"Brutal Weapons"	16 November 2009
