= Daniel Adams-Ray =

Swedish rapper, singer, and fashion designer

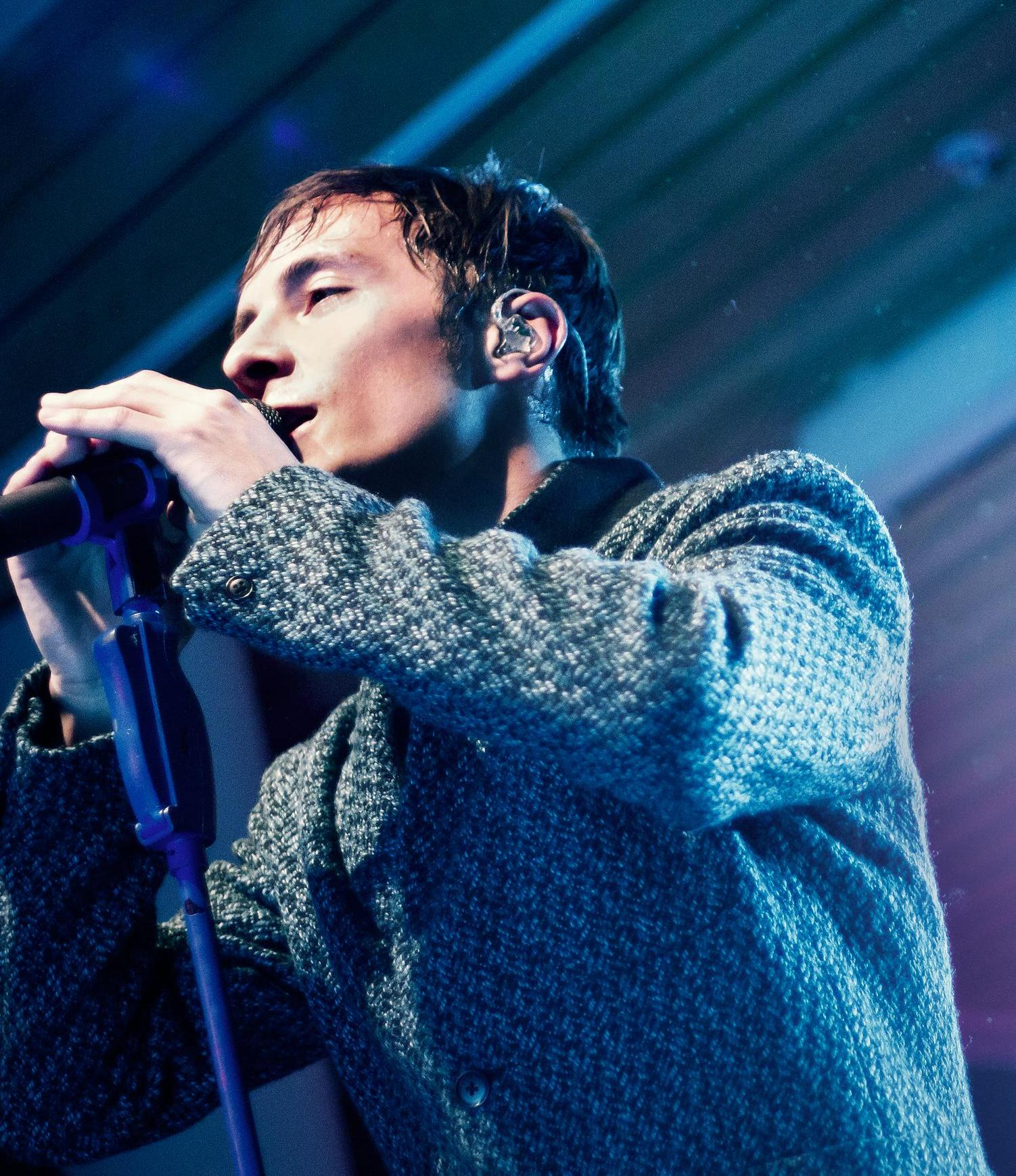
- Adams-Ray in 2011

Background information
- Also known as: Big Danne
- Born: Daniel David John Adams-Ray; 18 August 1983 (age 43); Nairobi, Kenya
- Genres: Hip hop; pop
- Occupations: Singer; rapper; songwriter; fashion designer
- Years active: 2000–present
- Labels: Sweden Records; Lagom Records
- Formerly of: Snook
- Website: www.danieladamsray.com

Daniel David John Adams-Ray (born 18 August 1983) is a Swedish singer, rapper, songwriter, and fashion designer. He rose to prominence as a member of the hip hop duo Snook.

== Background ==
Adams-Ray was born in Nairobi, Kenya, to an Indonesian-Dutch mother and a Swedish father. His mother was a school administrator and his father a medical surgeon. In 1996, the family left Africa for Europe and lived for a year in the Netherlands, where he played football with a very young Arjen Robben. Later the family left to Sweden, where they lived in Lidingö, an affluent suburb of Stockholm. His parents owned and operated a plastic-surgery clinic in the area. Adams-Ray says he felt very much like an outsider and says he was bullied and called racist slurs. After switching high schools, he started at Viktor Rydberg Gymnasium Odenplan and met Oskar Linnros, his future partner in the band Snook.

He is fluent in English, French, Dutch, German and Swedish. He also speaks quite a bit of Italian and Swahili.

He is related to Swedish journalist Kersti Adams-Ray.

== Career ==
=== Snook ===
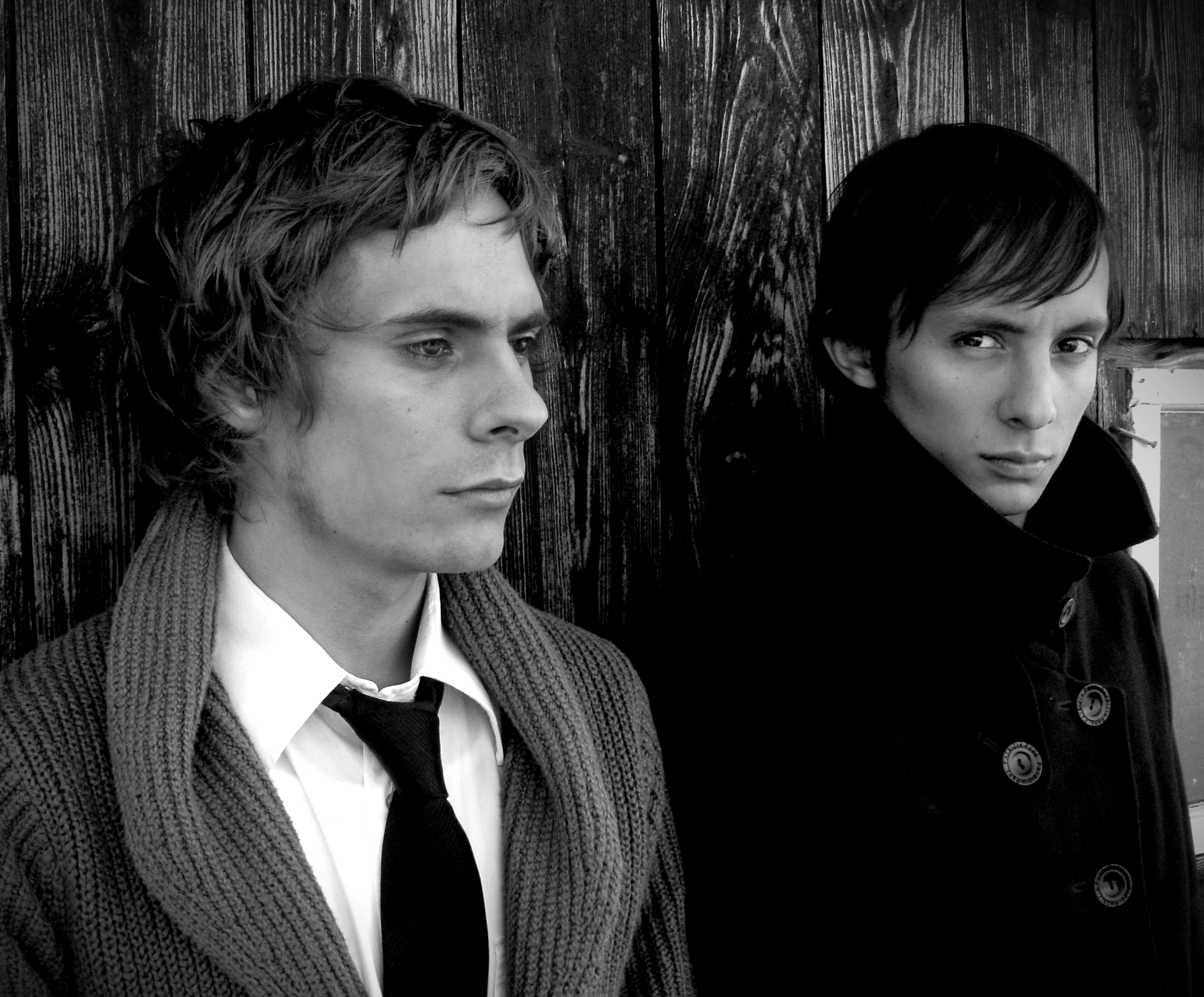
Daniel Adams-Ray as part of Snook alongside Oskar Linnros

The schoolmates and Oskar Linnros started an alternative hip hop duo group calling it Snook. The duo released two albums: Vi vet inte vart vi ska men vi ska komma dit in 2004 and Är in 2006 receiving both praise and heavy criticism. The band's unorthodox hip hop was met by comments that the band wasn't "keeping it real" and the fact that Adams-Ray spent his teenage years in Lidingö caused critics to label them "upper class rappers". Despite some critics, the band had many hits, received awards from radio station P3, The 2003 Swedish Hip-hop Awards 2003, and best Swedish band at the MTV Europe Music Awards 2006. Daniel Adams-Ray won the Swedish freestyle-rap championship in 2004 and was awarded the prize for best Swedish rapper in 2005.

=== Solo ===
Adams-Ray and Oskar Linnros drifted apart. Adams-Ray attended the design school Berghs School of Communication and started the fashion label Lagom. During a fashion show in 2009 he produced some music and this led to new songs (with him singing, not rapping). He says his music might be called Kenyan pop-disco-indie-punk. Influenced range from Motown-disco, afro beat, hip-hop and early 60's surf pop.

He had also collaborated with fellow Swede Avicii in a new song Somewhere in Stockholm, which belong to his album Stories. Three years later, he collaborated with Avicii again on a song titled "Ghost". For this single, Adams-Ray is credited under the name HUMAN.

== Discography ==
=== Studio albums ===
Album	Year	Chart peak	Certification
Album	Year	SWE	Certification
Svart, vitt och allt däremellan	2010	2	GLF: Platinum
Innan vi suddas ut	2013	4	
Döda hjärtan kan slå igen	2021	24	
Pandemi, Palestina & Heartache	2025	30	

=== Singles ===
Song	Year	Chart peak	Certification	Album
Song	Year	SWE	Certification	Album
"Dum av dig"	2010	16	GLF: Platinum	Svart, vitt och allt däremellan
"Gubben i lådan"	2010	1	GLF: 4× Platinum	Svart, vitt och allt däremellan
"Lilla lady"	2011	40	GLF: Platinum	Svart, vitt och allt däremellan
"Förlåt att jag aldrig sagt förlåt"	2011	8	GLF: 2× Platinum	Svart, vitt och allt däremellan
"Håll om mig" (with Petter)	2013	28	GLF: Platinum	Början på allt
"Precis som jag"	2013	25	GLF: Gold	Innan vi suddas ut
"Thinking of Sunshine"	2015	73	GLF: Platinum	Non-album single
"Isabel"	2016	78		För er
"Sitter på en dröm" (with Oskar Linnros)	2016	25	GLF: Gold	Non-album single
"Förlorad halleluja"	2020	— (Note: "Förlorad Halleluja" did not enter the Swedish Singellista Chart, but peaked at number 11 on the Swedish Heatseeker Chart.)		Döda hjärtan kan slå igen
"Bror"	2020	—		Döda hjärtan kan slå igen
"Stockholms voodoo"	2020	—		Non-album single
"Avundsjuk på regnet" (featuring Miriam Bryant)	2020	33	GLF: Gold	Döda hjärtan kan slå igen
"Lilla USA"	2020	—		Döda hjärtan kan slå igen
"Hela dagen är inte natt"	2020	—		Döda hjärtan kan slå igen
"Tunna kläder" (with Erik Lundin)	2021	— (Note: "Tunna kläder" did not enter the Swedish Singellista Chart, but peaked at number three on the Swedish Heatseeker Chart.)		Döda hjärtan kan slå igen
"Skotthål"	2021	25		Så mycket bättre
"Gråt inte mer"	2021	72		Så mycket bättre
"Forever Young"	2021	— (Note: "Forever Young" did not enter the Swedish Singles Chart, but peaked at number three on the Swedish Heatseeker chart.)		Så mycket bättre
"Fast för alltid"	2021	79		Så mycket bättre
"När jag blundar"	2022	98		Non-album single
"Numret har ingen abonnent"	2024	—		Pandemi, Palestina & Heartache
"Hur förklarar man sånt för datorer?"	2024	— (Note: "Hur förklarar man sånt för datorer?" did not enter the Swedish Singellista Chart, but peaked at number 19 on the Swedish Heatseeker Chart.)		Pandemi, Palestina & Heartache
"Du är nog"	2025	—		Pandemi, Palestina & Heartache

=== Featured singles ===
Song	Year	Chart peak	Album
Song	Year	SWE	Album
"Pris på mitt huvud" (Petter featuring Daniel Adams-Ray)	2016	75	Mitt folk

=== Other charted songs ===
Song	Year	Chart peak	Album
Song	Year	SWE	Album
"Svart"	2010	46	Svart, vitt och allt däremellan
"Gryningspyromanen"	2010	52	Svart, vitt och allt däremellan
"Döda hjärtan kan slå igen"	2021	— (Note: "Döda hjärtan kan slå igen" did not enter the Swedish Singles Chart, but peaked at number four on the Swedish Heatseeker chart.)	Döda hjärtan kan slå igen
