= Younger (Seinabo Sey song) =

Debut single by the Swedish singer Seinabo Sey

Single by Seinabo Sey

from the EP For Madeleine and the album Pretend
- Released: 25 November 2013
- Recorded: 2013
- Genre: Pop; soul; electropop
- Length: 3:34
- Songwriters: Seinabo Sey; Salem Al Fakir; Vincent Pontare; Magnus Lidehäll
- Producer: Magnus Lidehäll

Seinabo Sey singles chronology
"Younger" (2013)	"Hard Time" (2014)

Music video
- "Younger" on YouTube

"Younger" is the debut single by the Swedish pop-soul singer Seinabo Sey. Produced by Magnus Lidehäll, it was released on 25 November 2013 on Universal Music label, becoming a charting hit in Sweden (in January 2014) and Norway (May 2014). The song was featured on BBC Radio 1 as their Track of the Day for 16 April 2015.

Norwegian record producer and remixer Kygo remixed the song, now retitled "Younger (Kygo remix)". This release reached the top of the Norwegian Singles Chart.

== Charts ==
=== Weekly charts ===
Chart (2013–2015)	Peak position
Austria (Ö3 Austria Top 40)	54
Belgium (Ultratop 50 Flanders)	32
Belgium (Ultratop 50 Wallonia)	44
Denmark (Tracklisten)	12
Sweden (Sverigetopplistan)	14

=== Year-end charts ===
Chart (2014)	Position
Sweden (Sverigetopplistan)	23

== Certifications ==
Certifications for "Younger"
Region	Certification	Certified units/sales
Denmark (IFPI Danmark)	Platinum	60,000^{^}
Germany (BVMI)	Gold	150,000^{‡}
Italy (FIMI)	Gold	25,000^{‡}
Norway (IFPI Norway)	7× Platinum	70,000^{‡}
Sweden (GLF)	4× Platinum	160,000^{‡}
United Kingdom (BPI)	Silver	200,000^{‡}
Streaming
Denmark (IFPI Danmark)	Gold	1,300,000^{†}
^{^} Shipments figures based on certification alone.^{‡} Sales+streaming figures based on certification alone.^{†} Streaming-only figures based on certification alone.

== Kygo remix ==
"Younger (Kygo remix)"

Single by Seinabo Sey and Kygo

from the EP For Madeleine and the album Pretend
- Released: December 2013
- Recorded: 2013
- Genre: Tropical house
- Length: 5:52
- Producer: Kygo

Kygo singles chronology
"Epsilon" (2013)	"Younger (Kygo remix)" (2013)	"Cut Your Teeth (Kygo remix)" (2014)

Music video
- "Younger (Kygo remix)" on YouTube

"Younger" was later remixed and released as a single by Norwegian musician and remixer Kygo. It features influences of electronic music, chill-out, and a bit of dance-pop and house music. The song was a number one hit on the Norwegian singles chart.

=== Charts ===
Chart (2013–2015)	Peak position
Netherlands (Single Top 100)	24
Norway (VG-lista)	1
