= Boys II Men (album) =

Studio album by Maskinen
- Released: 18 November 2009
- Genre: Hip hop
- Length: 50:49
- Label: Pope Records

Boys II Men is the first studio album by Maskinen, released on 18 November 2009.

== Track listing ==
1. "Segertåget" - 3:26
2. "Bränner" - 3:27
3. "Dansa med vapen" - 3:35
4. "Nr 1" - 3:58
5. "Gatan upp" - 6:37
6. "Maskinen för alltid" - 1:44
7. "Undan för pundarn" - 3:32
8. "Alla som inte dansar" - 3:38
9. "Flow Ball" (feat. Bonde do Rolê) - 3:47
10. "Aldrig vart i Malmö" - 4:05
11. "Buffalo Blues" - 4:29
12. "Pengar" - 3:12
13. "Kärlek vid sista ögonkastet" - 4:59

== Charts ==
Chart (2009)	Peak position
Sweden (Sverigetopplistan)	40
