= Afasi & Filthy =

Swedish hip hop duo

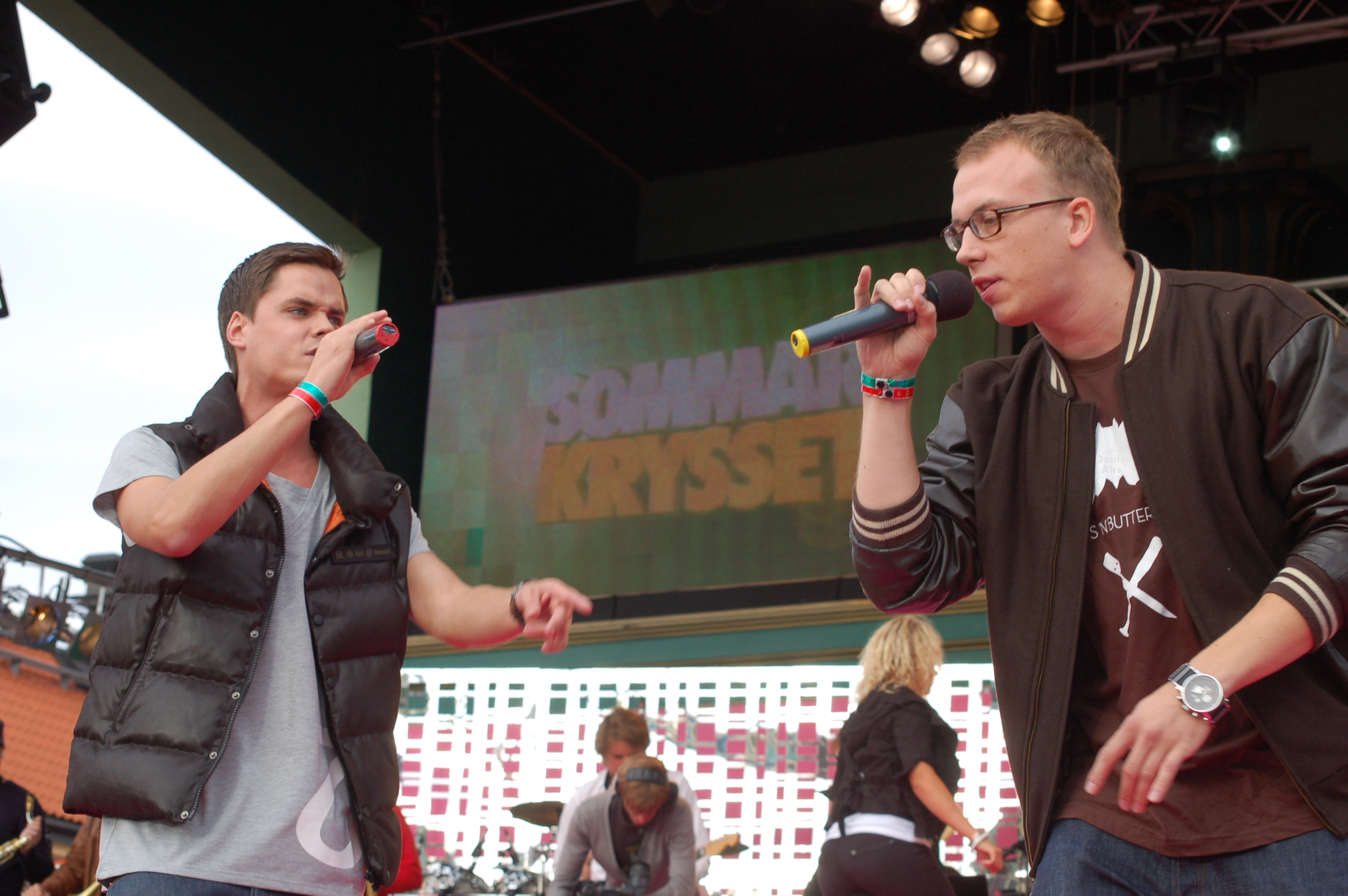

Background information
- Origin: Uppsala, Sweden
- Genre: Hip hop
- Years active: 2002–2009
- Past members: Herbert Munkhammar (Afasi); Magnus Lidehäll (Filthy)
- Website: www.myspace.com/afasifilthy

Afasi och Filthy was a Swedish hip hop duo from Uppsala, Sweden composed of rapper Herbert Munkhammar (known as Afasi) and producer Magnus Lidehäll (known as Filthy).

== Career ==
Munkhammar and Lidehäll were classmates in the same school and they started performing at their school in Uppsala. They have moved to Malmö for a few years and then to Stockholm.

Filthy released his first mixtape in autumn 2001 Snus, Porr & Brännvin with rapper Spakur. This caught the attention of indie label/website Streetzone where they released the EP 1990 Nånting. The title track, that included a collaboration from Snook was released on radio in Spring/Summer 2003 charted in Sweden.

Based on this radio success, the duo signed a contract with BMG, releasing the single "Bomfalleralla". But after disagreements, they broke the contract with BMG in Spring 2005 preferring to work independently. Their first single on their own label was "Le Parkour" followed by EP Jag kunde inte bry mig mindre. Albums Skruvat & choppat av Afasi in 2006 and Hotell Stress were released, the latter in 2 separate volumes in 2006 and 2007. Fläcken is the band's critically acclaimed final album under the duo name.

== After break-up ==
The duo continued under the name Afasi & Filthy until 2009.

Herbert Munkhammar (Afasi) decided to join Maskinen. Afasi also eventually became part of another singing duo Ansiktet. He was featured as a guest singer in Grandmaster Flash album The Bridge (Concept of a Culture) on the song "We Speak Hip Hop".

Magnus Lidehäll continued with a successful producing and songwriting career, most notably writing "Cupid Boy" (2010) for Kylie Minogue, album Aphrodite. He co-wrote and produced (together with Bloodshy & Henrik Jonback) two songs "How I Roll" and "Trip To Your Heart" (2011) for Britney Spears, album Femme Fatale. He was also writer and producer for Sky Ferreira single "One" and Lena Philipsson single "Idiot". He has also worked with producers such as Bloodshy & Avant, Sebastian Ingrosso. The song "Bomfalleralla" was featured on the soundtrack for The Fault in Our Stars.

== Awards ==
In January 2009, Afasy & Filthy won a Swedish Grammy in "Best Dance/Hip hop/Soul category" for their album Fläcken.

== Discography ==
=== Albums ===
- 2002: Snus, Porr och Brännvin
- 2006: Hotell Stress
- 2006: Skruvat & choppat av Afasi
- 2006: Hotell Stress vol. 2
- 2008: Fläcken

=== EPs ===
- 2003: 1990 Nånting EP
- 2005: Jag kunde inte bry mig mindre EP

=== Singles ===
- 2003: "1990 nånting" feat. Snook
- 2004: "Bomfalleralla"
- 2005: "Le Parkour"
- 2006: "Hej hej"
- 2006: "Eller hur!?"
- 2007: "Fredag hela månan"
- 2008: "Glider"
- 2008: "Jobb"
- 2008: "Sverigetrotters"

== In other media ==
Young Adult Fiction author John Green has said that he enjoys Afasi & Filthy's music, despite not knowing any Swedish. Green mentioned the group in his novel The Fault In Our Stars. In the novel, the fictional writer Peter Van Houten is a fan of the group and plays their song "Bomfalleralla" when the main characters Hazel and Augustus meet him. "Bomfalleralla" is featured during this scene in the movie adaptation.
