= Snook (band) =

Swedish musical duo

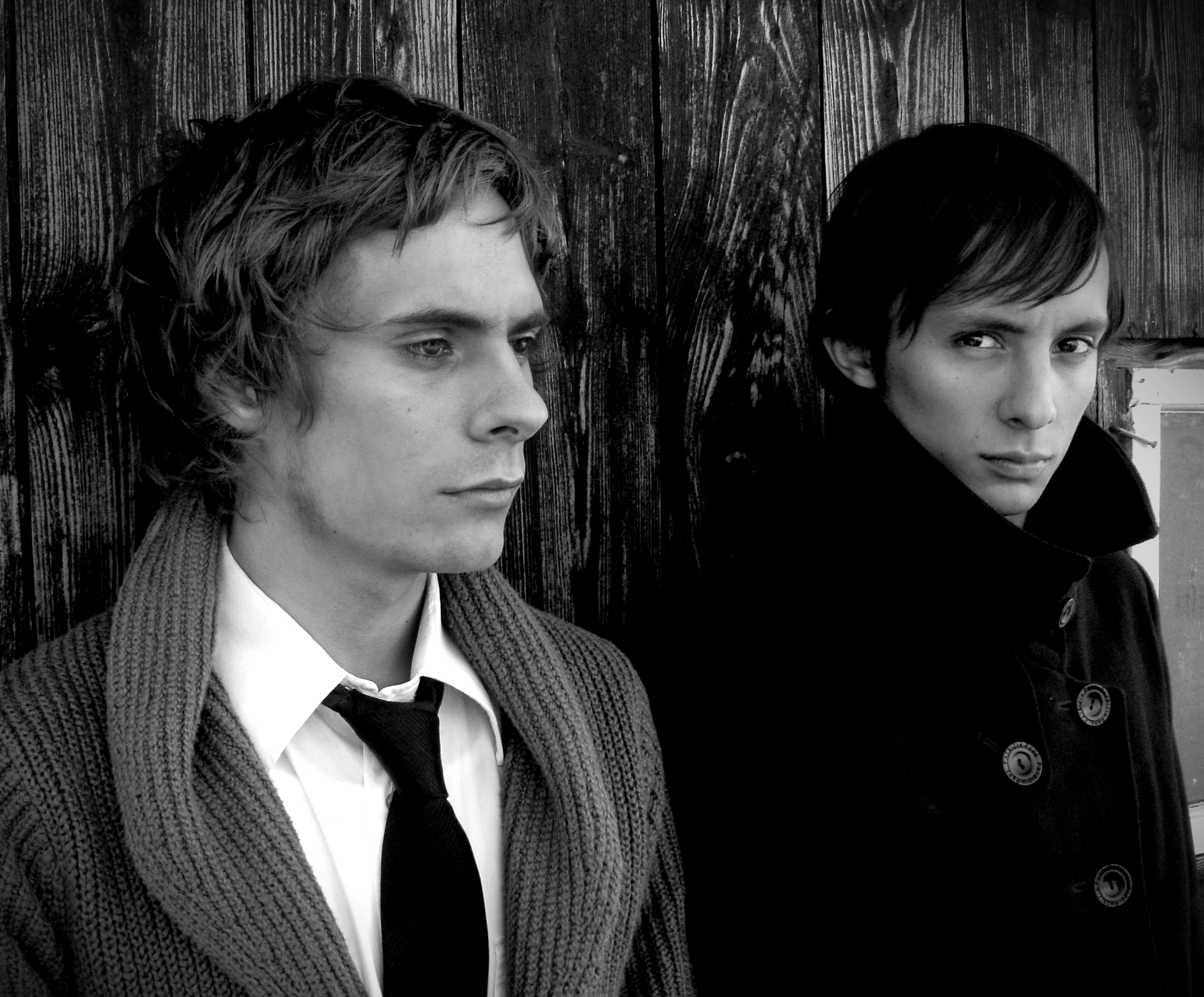

Background information
- Origin: Stockholm, Sweden
- Years active: 2000–2009
- Label: POPE
- Members: Oskar Linnros; Daniel Adams-Ray

Snook (Swedish pronunciation: [ˈsnuːk]) was a Swedish hip-hop duo consisting of Oskar "Kihlen" Linnros and Daniel "Danne" Adams-Ray. The group has released two full-length studio albums and several singles. They won the Best Swedish Act at the 2006 MTV Europe Music Awards.

Linnros and Adams-Ray met in high school, Viktor Rydberg Gymnasium. They formed Snook (snok is a Swedish slang term for "nose") in 2000. The group's first single 1990 nånting (Eng: "1990 something"), featuring Afasi & Filthy, became a big hit in Sweden. They were critically acclaimed because of their different sound as compared to the general Swedish hip-hop. Their debut album Vi vet inte vart vi ska, men vi ska komma dit (Eng: "We don't know where we're going, but we will get there") was released in May 2004, and was one of the most praised records in Sweden that year. Snook received a P3 Guld award for their hit "Mister Cool".

After the group disbanded in 2009, Linnros and Adams-Ray embarked on successful solo careers. Linnros released his debut album Vilja Bli (Want to Become) on 9 June 2010. Six months later, Adams-Ray released his debut album Svart, Vitt och allt däremellan (Black, White and Everything in Between).

== Discography ==
=== Albums ===
Year	Album	Chart peak SWE	Certification
2004	Vi vet inte vart vi ska men vi ska komma dit	39	
2006	Är	25	

=== Singles ===
Charting

Year	Single	Chart peak SWE	Certification	Album
2004	"Mister Cool"	2		Vi vet inte vart vi ska men vi ska komma dit
2006	"Snook, svett och tårar"	21		Är

Others

- 2004: "Lejonhjärta" feat. Organism 12
- 2003: "1990 Nånting" feat. Afasi & Filthy
- 2004: "Såpbubblor"
- 2006: "Längst fram i taxin"
- 2006: "Kommer ifrån"
- 2007: "Inga problem"
- 2007: "Inga problem (Remix)" feat. Veronica Maggio & Petter

== See also ==
- Swedish hip hop
