= Oskar Linnros =

Swedish musician (born 1983)

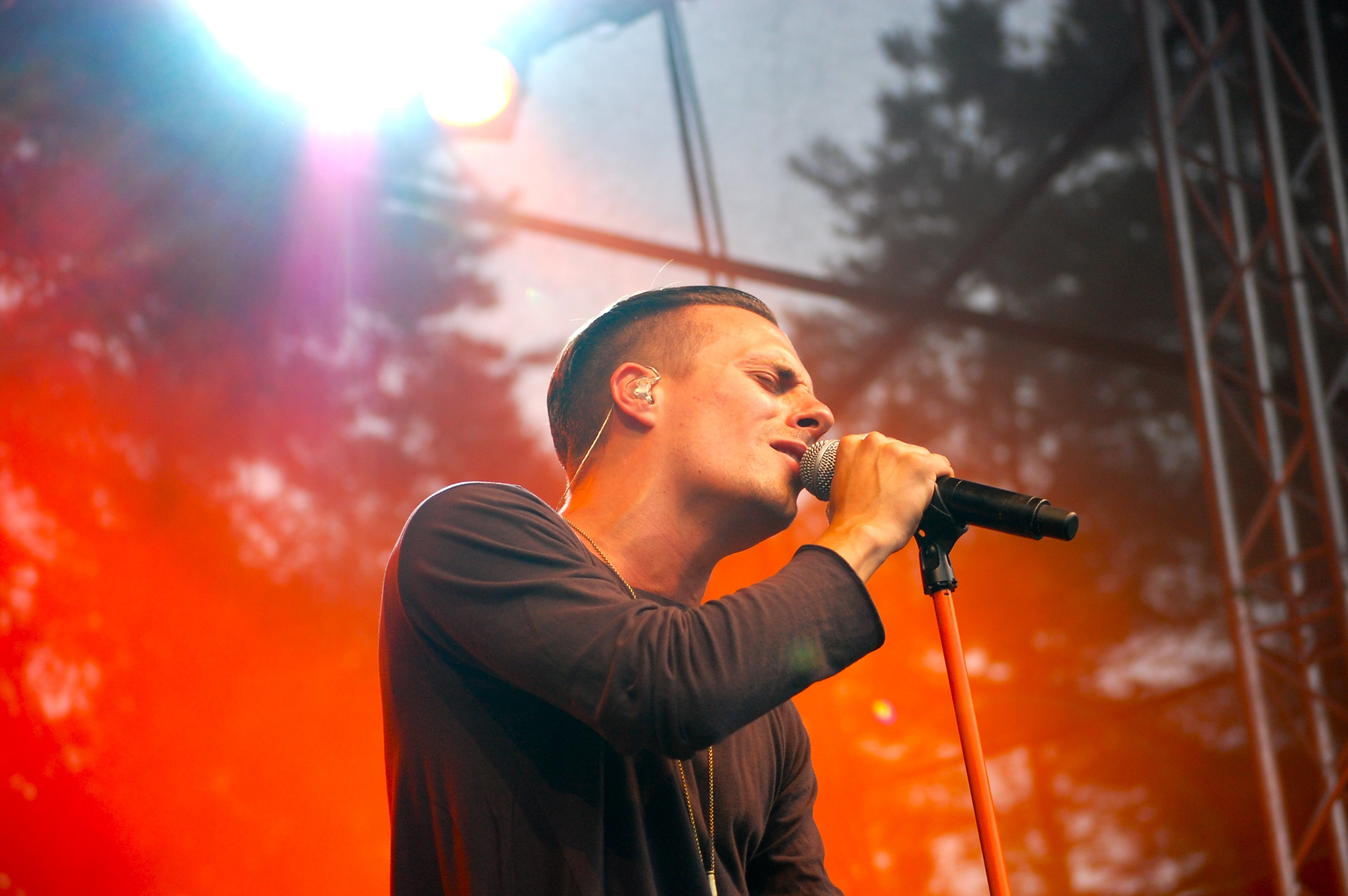

Background information
- Also known as: Kihlen
- Born: August 15, 1983 (age 43); Sundbyberg, Sweden
- Genres: Hip hop, soul, pop
- Occupations: singer, rapper, songwriter, record producer
- Label: Pope Records/Universal Music
- Website: oskarlinnros.se

Hans Oskar Linnros (born August 15, 1983) is a Swedish singer, rapper, songwriter, and record producer. He was part of the alternative hip hop band Snook alongside Daniel Adams-Ray, before going solo and releasing his solo studio debut album Vilja bli that reached number 2 on the Swedish Albums Chart. The track "Från och med Du" from the album reached the top of Sverigetopplistan, the official Swedish Singles Chart.

Linnros has also produced a number of other artists including acts Petter, Fibes, Oh Fibes! and Veronica Maggio.

== Biography ==
=== Snook ===
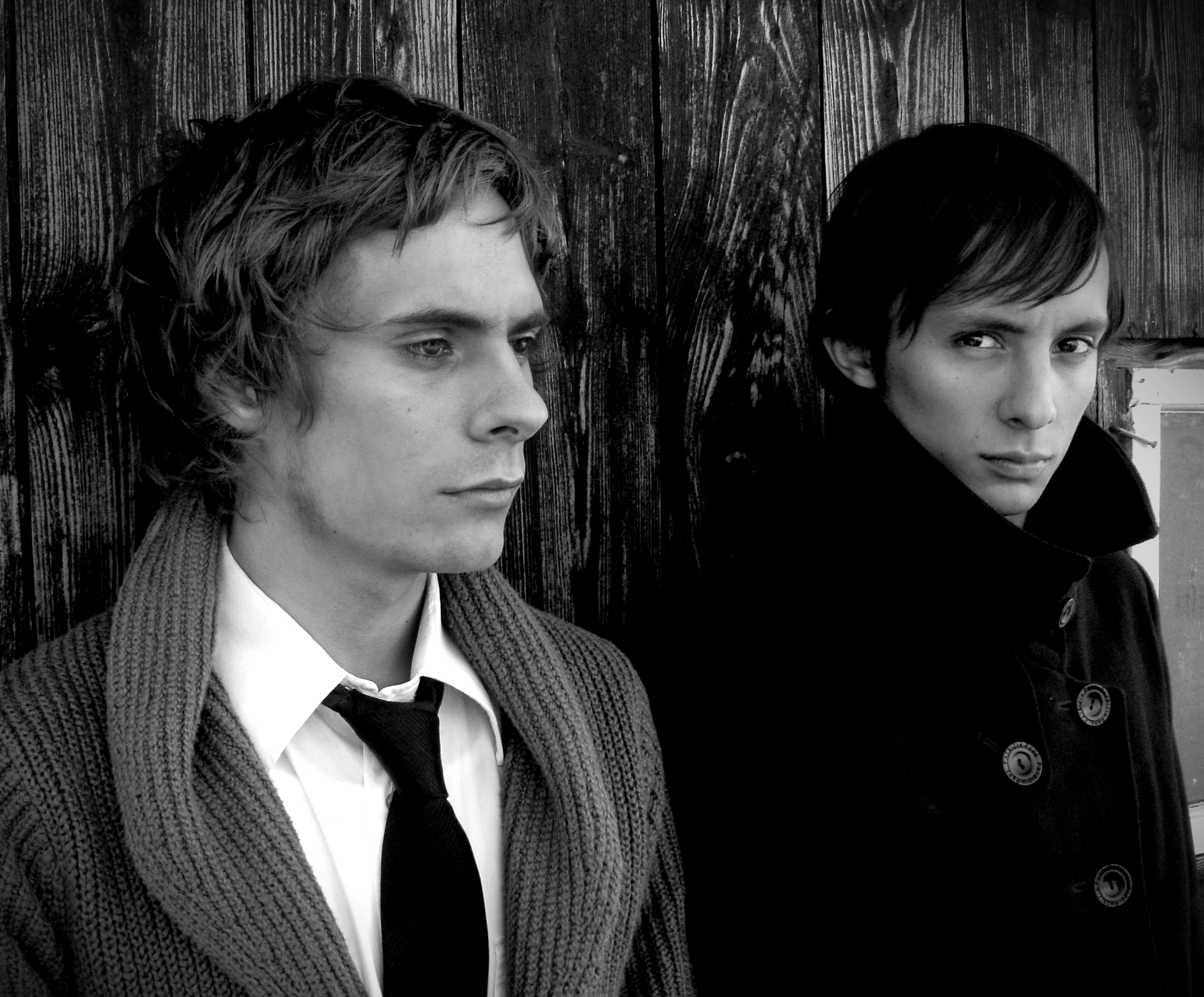
Oskar Linnros as part of Snook alongside Daniel Adams-Ray

Linnros started out as a rapper in the alternative hip hop duo Snook together with Daniel Adams-Ray. Snook released two albums: Vi vet inte vart vi ska men vi ska komma dit in 2004 and Är in 2006 receiving both praise and heavy criticism. The bands unorthodox hip hop was met by comments that the band wasn’t keeping it real and the fact that Adams-Ray spent his teenage years in Lidingö caused critics to label them “Upper class rappers”. Despite some critics, the band had many hits, received awards from radio station P3, The 2003 Swedish Hip-hop Awards 2003, and best Swedish band at the MTV Europe Music Awards 2006.

=== Post Snook ===
Snook drifted apart. Daniel Adams-Ray attended design school Berghs School of Communication Linnros started producing other artists such as rapper Petter, soft rockers Fibes, Oh Fibes! and singer Veronica Maggio. The album Linnros produced and wrote for Maggio, Och vinnaren är... was nominated for five Swedish Grammies. The two had met while working on a remix for Petter and became romantically involved. He also started Baile funk and electro influenced rap group Maskinen. The group is still around but Linnros left. He explained to newspaper Dagens Nyheter that it was just a fun project with friends and he was tired of " fastfood music".

=== Solo ===
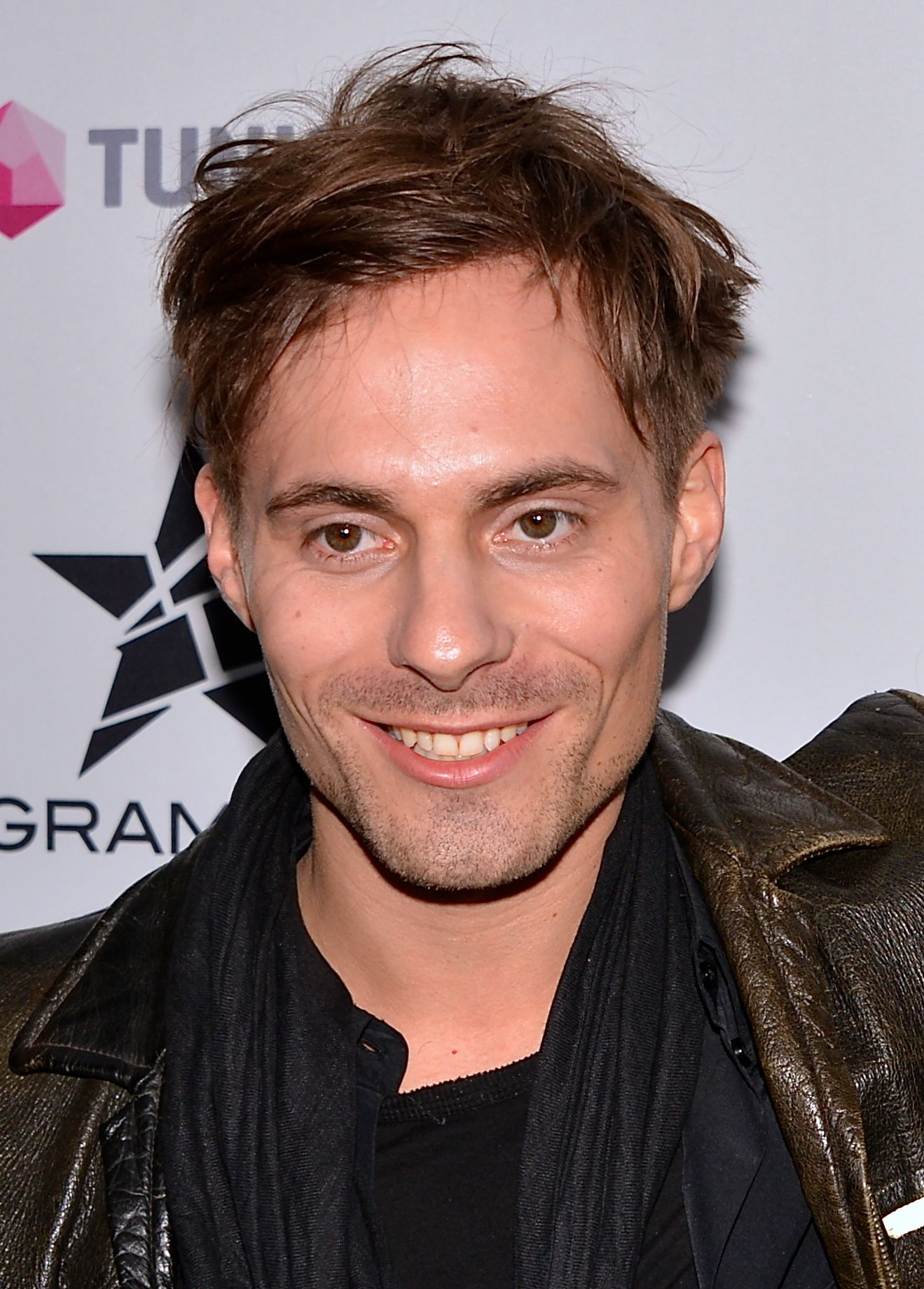
Oskar Linnros during Grammisgalan on 20 February 2013.

In June 2010, Oskar Linnros released Vilja bli, an album he had written, played and produced. The album contained hardly any rap vocals and was quickly compared to Swedish artists such as Mauro Scocco, Orup and Peter LeMarc, artists that were extremely popular in Scandinavia in the late 1980s and early 1990s. Linnros admitted that he wanted to bring back an updated version of that sound. He also named Donny Hathaway and Al Green as influences. The album received very good reviews and influential music journalist Jan Gradvall wrote that the album "is one of the most complete Swedish debut album I have heard and full of hits". Oskar was nominated for a Swedish Grammies 2018 in "Best Pop" for the album "Väntar på en Ängel".

== Discography ==
=== Albums ===
| Year | Album | Peak positions | Certifications |
| Year | Album | SWE | Certifications |
|---|---|---|---|
| 2010 | Vilja bli | 2 | GLF: Platinum |
| 2013 | Klappar och slag | 3 | |
| 2017 | Väntar på en ängel | 6 | |
| 2026 | Det högsta ljud jag hört | 6 | |

=== Extended plays ===
| Year | EP | Peak positions |
| Year | EP | SWE |
|---|---|---|
| 2017 | Väntar på en | 8 |

=== Singles ===
| Year | Title | Peak positions | Certifications (sales threshold) | Album |
| Year | Title | SWE | Certifications (sales threshold) | Album |
|---|---|---|---|---|
| 2010 | "Ack, Sundbyberg" | 52 | Gold | Vilja bli |
| 2010 | "Från och med Du" | 1 | Platinum | Vilja bli |
| 2010 | "Genom eld" | 43 | Gold | Vilja bli |
| 2011 | "25" | — | | Vilja bli |
| 2013 | "Hur dom än" | 15 | Gold | Klappar och slag |
| 2013 | "Från balkongen" | 26 | | Klappar och slag |
| 2013 | "Kan jag få ett vittne?" | 31 | | Klappar och slag |
| 2017 | "Bäst" | 36 | | Väntar på en Ängel |
| 2017 | "Oavsett" | 54 | | Väntar på en Ängel |
| 2017 | "Wifi" / "Wifi Remix" (featuring Jireel and Ana Diaz) | 31 | | Väntar på en Ängel |
| 2024 | "Hypnotiserad" | — (Note: "Hypnotiserad" did not enter the Swedish Singellista Chart, but peaked at number five on the Swedish Heatseeker Chart.) | | Non-album single |
| 2025 | "Konstig" | 99 | | Det högsta ljud jag hört |
| 2026 | "Himlen är oskyldigt blå" | 65 | | Non-album single |
| 2026 | "Bara mellan oss" | — (Note: "Bara mellan oss" did not enter the Swedish Singellista Chart, but peaked at number 8 on the Swedish Heatseeker Chart.) | | Det högsta ljud jag hört |
| 2026 | "Pappa kommer inte hem" | 72 | | Det högsta ljud jag hört |
