= Veronica Maggio discography =

- Studio albums: 8
- Singles: 31

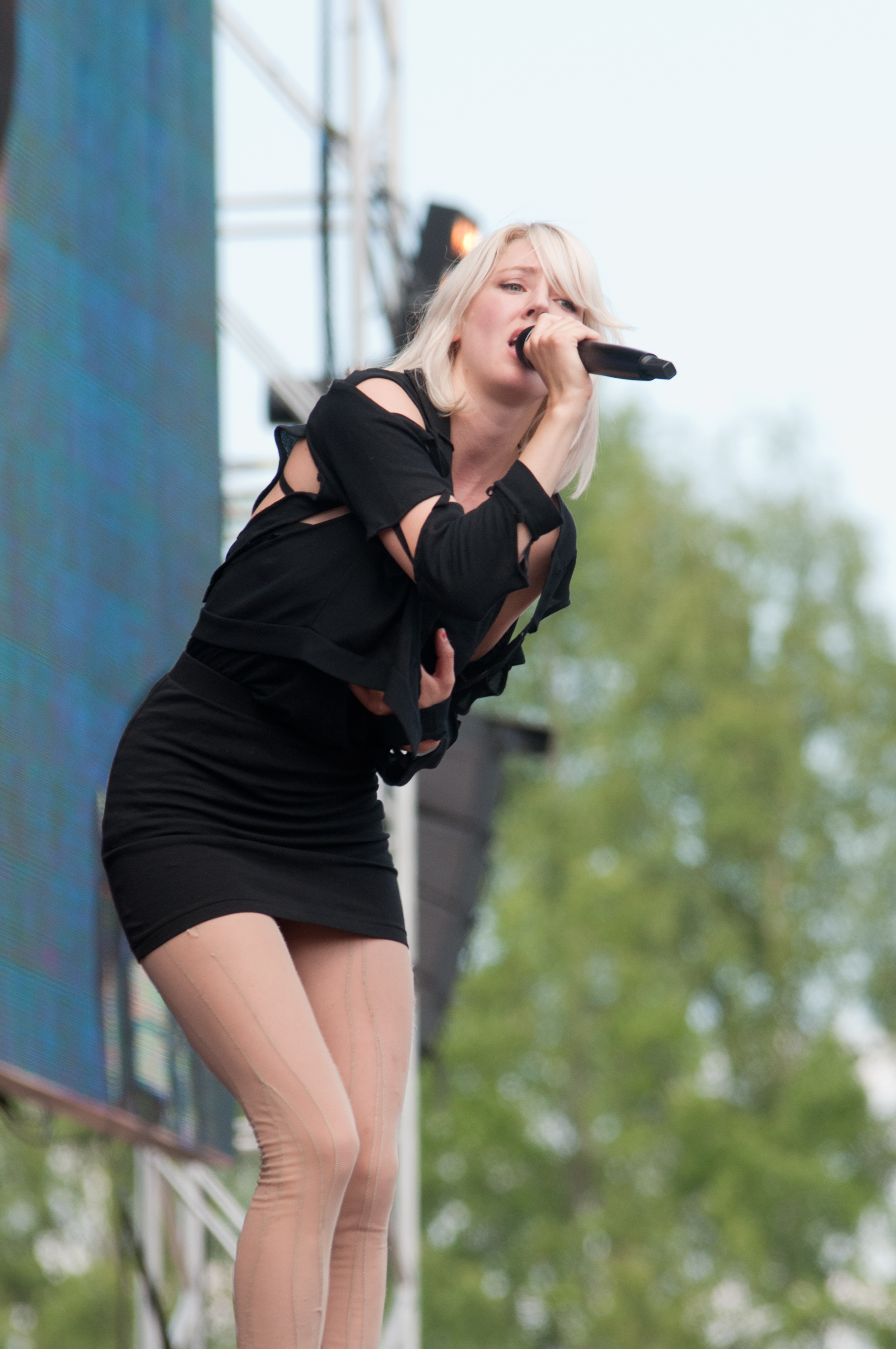

The discography of Veronica Maggio, a Swedish singer, consists of eight studio albums and 28 singles.

In September 2006, Veronica released her debut studio album, Vatten och bröd, which peaked at number 14 on the Swedish Albums Chart, the album includes the singles "Dumpa mig", "Nöjd?" and "Havanna mamma". She released her second studio album Och vinnaren är... in March 2008, which peaked at number 7 on the Swedish Albums Chart and Norwegian Albums Chart, the album includes the singles "Måndagsbarn", "Stopp" and "17 år". In April 2011 she released her third studio album Satan i gatan, which peaked at number one on the Swedish Albums Chart, number two on the Norwegian Albums Chart, number 24 on the Danish Albums Chart and number 33 on the Finnish Albums Chart. The album includes the singles "Jag kommer" and "Välkommen in".

== Studio albums ==
Title	Details	Peak chart positions				Certifications
Title	Details	SWE	DEN	FIN	NOR	Certifications
Vatten och bröd	Released: 6 September 2006; Label: Universal Music; Formats: LP, CD, digital download	14	—	—	—	
Och vinnaren är...	Released: 28 March 2008; Label: Universal Music; Formats: LP, CD, digital download	7	—	—	7	GLF: Platinum
Satan i gatan	Released: 27 April 2011; Label: Universal Music; Formats: LP, CD, digital download	1	24	33	2	GLF: 3× Platinum; IFPI NOR: Gold
Handen i fickan fast jag bryr mig	Released: 4 October 2013; Label: Universal Music; Formats: LP, CD, digital download	1	—	32	2	GLF: 2× Platinum
Den första är alltid gratis	Released: 6 May 2016; Label: Universal Music; Formats: LP, CD, digital download	1	—	33	6	GLF: Platinum
Fiender är tråkigt	Released: 14 June 2019; Label: Universal Music; Formats: LP, CD, digital download, streaming	1	—	—	40	GLF: Platinum
Och som vanligt händer det något hemskt	Released: 20 May 2022; Label: Universal Music; Formats: LP, digital download, streaming	3	—	—	—	
Sciura	Released: 3 October 2025; Label: Universal Music; Formats: LP, digital download, streaming	11	—	—	—	
"—" denotes album that did not chart or was not released in that territory.

== Extended plays ==
Title	Details	Peak chart positions
Title	Details	SWE
Och som vanligt händer det något hemskt (Kapitel 1)	Released: 29 October 2021; Label: Universal Music; Formats: Digital download, streaming	7

== Singles ==
=== As lead artist ===
Year	Title	Peak chart positions			Certifications	Album
Year	Title	SWE	NOR	DEN	Certifications	Album
2006	"Dumpa mig"	14	—	—		Vatten och bröd
2006	"Nöjd?"	6	—	—		Vatten och bröd
2006	"Havanna mamma"	—	—	—		Vatten och bröd
2008	"Måndagsbarn"	23	1	8	GLF: Gold	Och vinnaren är...
2008	"Stopp"	30	—	—		Och vinnaren är...
2009	"17 år"	11	—	—	GLF: Gold	Och vinnaren är...
2011	"Jag kommer"	1	12	—	GLF: 7× Platinum	Satan i gatan
2011	"Välkommen in"	2	—	—	GLF: 3× Platinum	Satan i gatan
2012	"Mitt hjärta blöder"	5	—	—		Satan i gatan
2013	"Sergels torg"	6	—	—	GLF: Platinum	Handen i fickan fast jag bryr mig
2014	"Hela huset" (featuring Håkan Hellström)	8	—	—	GLF: 3× Platinum	Handen i fickan fast jag bryr mig
2014	"Låtsas som det regnar"	14	—	—		Handen i fickan fast jag bryr mig
2016	"Den första är alltid gratis"	16	—	—		Den första är alltid gratis
2016	"Ayahuasca"	35	—	—	GLF: Platinum	Den första är alltid gratis
2016	"Vi mot världen"	10	—	—		Den första är alltid gratis
2016	"Dom sa!"	71	—	—		Den första är alltid gratis
2018	"20 Questions (From Bergman's Reliquary)"	29	—	—	GLF: Platinum	Non-album single
2019	"Kurt Cobain"	4	—	—		Fiender är tråkigt
2019	"Tillfälligheter"	4	—	—		Fiender är tråkigt
2019	"5 minuter"	7	—	—		Fiender är tråkigt
2021	"Se mig"	5	—	—	GLF: 2× Platinum	Och som vanligt händer det något hemskt
2021	"Nu stannar vi på marken"	45	—	—		Non-album single
2021	"Varsomhelst/Närsomhelst"	13	—	—		Och som vanligt händer det något hemskt
2021	"På en buss"	26	—	—		Och som vanligt händer det något hemskt
2022	"Höghusdrömmar"	22	—	—		Och som vanligt händer det något hemskt
2022	"070-xxxx xxx"	57	—	—		Och som vanligt händer det något hemskt
2022	"Heaven med dig"	18	—	—		Och som vanligt händer det något hemskt
2022	"Låt mig gå"	19	—	—		Och som vanligt händer det något hemskt
2023	"Under någon ny" (with Miriam Bryant)	4	—	—		Okej att dö
2023	"Occhi d'amore" (with NOTD)	7	—	—	GLF: Platinum	Non-album singles
2023	"Det kommer aldrig va över för mig"	1	—	—		Non-album singles
2025	"Inte bra i grupp"	21	—	—		Sciura
2025	"Level Up"	55	—	—		Sciura
2025	"Backspegeln"	29	—	—		Sciura
2026	"Sy dig på mig"	68	—	—		Sciura (reissue)
2026	"Hon är kaos" (with Jonatan Leandoer96)	— (Note: "Hon är kaos" did not enter the Swedish Singellista Chart, but peaked at number three on the Swedish Heatseeker Chart.)	—	—		Sciura (reissue)
2026	"Min vita kanin"	44	—	—		Sciura (reissue)
"—" denotes single that did not chart or was not released in that territory.

=== As featured artist ===
Year	Title	Peak chart positions	Album
Year	Title	SWE	Album
2010	"Längesen" (Petter featuring Veronica Maggio)	2	Non-album single

== Other charted songs ==
Year	Title	Peak chart positions		Album
Year	Title	SWE	NOR	Album
2011	"Satan i gatan"	2	—	Satan i gatan
2011	"Snälla bli min"	6	—	Satan i gatan
2011	"Inga kläder"	12	—	Satan i gatan
2011	"Vi kommer alltid ha Paris"	18	—	Satan i gatan
2011	"Sju sorger"	18	—	Satan i gatan
2011	"Alla mina låtar"	24	—	Satan i gatan
2011	"Finns det en så finns det flera"	27	—	Satan i gatan
2011	"Lördagen den femtonde mars"	30	—	Satan i gatan
2013	"Hädanefter"	12	—	Handen i fickan fast jag bryr mig
2013	"Va kvar"	15	—	Handen i fickan fast jag bryr mig
2013	"Jag lovar"	16	—	Handen i fickan fast jag bryr mig
2013	"I min bil"	17	4	Handen i fickan fast jag bryr mig
2013	"Mörkt"	19	—	Handen i fickan fast jag bryr mig
2013	"Trädgården en fredag"	21	—	Handen i fickan fast jag bryr mig
2013	"Dallas"	32	—	Handen i fickan fast jag bryr mig
2013	"Bas gillar hörn"	33	—	Handen i fickan fast jag bryr mig
2016	"Femton"	74	—	Den första är alltid gratis
2016	"Gjord av sten"	75	—	Den första är alltid gratis
2016	"Svart sommar"	78	—	Den första är alltid gratis
2016	"Play och sen repeat"	79	—	Den första är alltid gratis
2016	"Verkligheten"	— (Note: "Verkligheten" did not enter the Swedish Singles Chart, but peaked at number one on the Swedish Heatseeker chart.)	—	Den första är alltid gratis
2016	"Storma tills vi dör"	— (Note: "Storma tills vi dör" did not enter the Swedish Singles Chart, but peaked at number two on the Swedish Heatseeker chart.)	—	Den första är alltid gratis
2016	"Pang pang"	— (Note: "Pang pang" did not enter the Swedish Singles Chart, but peaked at number four on the Swedish Heatseeker chart.)	—	Den första är alltid gratis
2016	"Förlorad för alltid"	— (Note: "Förlorad för alltid" did not enter the Swedish Singles Chart, but peaked at number five on the Swedish Heatseeker chart.)	—	Den första är alltid gratis
2016	"Galaxen"	— (Note: "Galaxen" did not enter the Swedish Singles Chart, but peaked at number nine on the Swedish Heatseeker chart.)	—	Den första är alltid gratis
2019	"Hornstullsstrand" (Hov1 featuring Veronica Maggio)	1	—	Vindar på Mars
2019	"Solen har gått ner"	12	—	Fiender är tråkigt
2019	"En timme till"	18	—	Fiender är tråkigt
2019	"Jag kastar bort mitt liv"	38	—	Fiender är tråkigt
2019	"Fiender är tråkigt"	29	—	Fiender är tråkigt
2019	"Där hjärtat satt förut"	31	—	Fiender är tråkigt
2019	"Rosa drinkar och champagne"	— (Note: "Rosa drinkar och champagne" did not enter the Swedish Singellista Chart, but peaked at number 10 on the Swedish Heatseeker Chart.)	—	Fiender är tråkigt
2021	"Var är du?"	— (Note: "Var är du?" did not enter the Swedish Singellista Chart, but peaked at number 17 on the Swedish Heatseeker Chart.)	—	Och som vanligt händer det något hemskt
2021	"Daddy Issues"	53	—	Och som vanligt händer det något hemskt
2022	"Fint i mörker"	— (Note: "Fint i mörker" did not enter the Swedish Singellista Chart, but peaked at number eight on the Swedish Heatseeker Chart.)	—	Och som vanligt händer det något hemskt
2025	"Hämta mer"	44	—	Sciura

== Songwriting credits ==
Song	Year	Artist	Album	Ref.
"Världen snurrar"	2012	Lena Philipsson	Världen Snurrar	
"Hey Brother"	2013	Avicii	True	
"Blåmärkshårt (Mi amor)"	2019	Miriam Bryant	Mi amor	
