= Jag kommer =

2011 single by Veronica Maggio

Single by Veronica Maggio

from the album Satan i gatan
- Released: 10 February 2011
- Genre: Pop rock
- Length: 3:24
- Label: Universal Music
- Songwriters: Veronica Maggio; Christian Walz; Stefan Olsson
- Producer: Christian Walz

Veronica Maggio singles chronology
"Längesen" (2010)	"Jag kommer" (2011)	"Välkommen in" (2011)

Music video
- "Jag kommer" on YouTube

"Jag kommer" (English: "I'm coming") is a song that was recorded by Swedish singer Veronica Maggio and is included on her third studio album Satan i gatan (2011). Maggio co-wrote the song with Steffan Olsson and the track's producer Christian Walz. On 10 February 2011, it was released to contemporary hit radio stations in Sweden as the album's lead single. The track is a pop rock song about the beginning of a relationship. Some music critics noted a double entendre in the lyrics, though according to Maggio, the song's meaning is open to interpretation. It also attracted accusations of plagiarism of the Strokes' "Reptilia" from the Swedish public, which the singer denied.

The song's critical reception was positive; some reviewers called it one of the best tracks on Satan i gatan. "Jag kommer" peaked at number one on Sweden's Sverigetopplistan chart, making it Maggio's first number-one single in the country. The song has been certified septuple platinum in Sweden by the Swedish Recording Industry Association (GLF). It peaked at number 12 on Norway's Topp 20 Singles and was certified double platinum by IFPI Norway.

A music video for "Jag kommer", directed by Robinovich, was uploaded to Maggio's YouTube channel on 11 April 2011. It depicts the singer trying to exit her apartment as the floor moves in the opposite direction of the one she walks to. Maggio performed the song in multiple occasions, including Peace & Love and Øyafestivalen. In 2011, it won the Rockbjörnen prize for Best Swedish Song, and the Swedish hit of the Year award at the GAFFA Awards. It was also nominated for Song of the Year at both the Grammis and P3 Guld Awards of 2012.

An English-language version of the song, titled "I'm Coming", was released by Swedish singer Tove Lo on 20 March 2020 as part of Spotify's Studio It's Hits program. In contrast to the original's pop-rock sound, Lo's cover is a synth-pop track with a "throbbing" beat. Lo wanted to make something sonically new without losing "the magic" of the original. Music critics called Lo's version one of the week's best releases and compared it with the music of Robyn. Lo's version of "Jag kommer" reached number 12 in Sweden and number 34 in Norway.

== Production and release ==
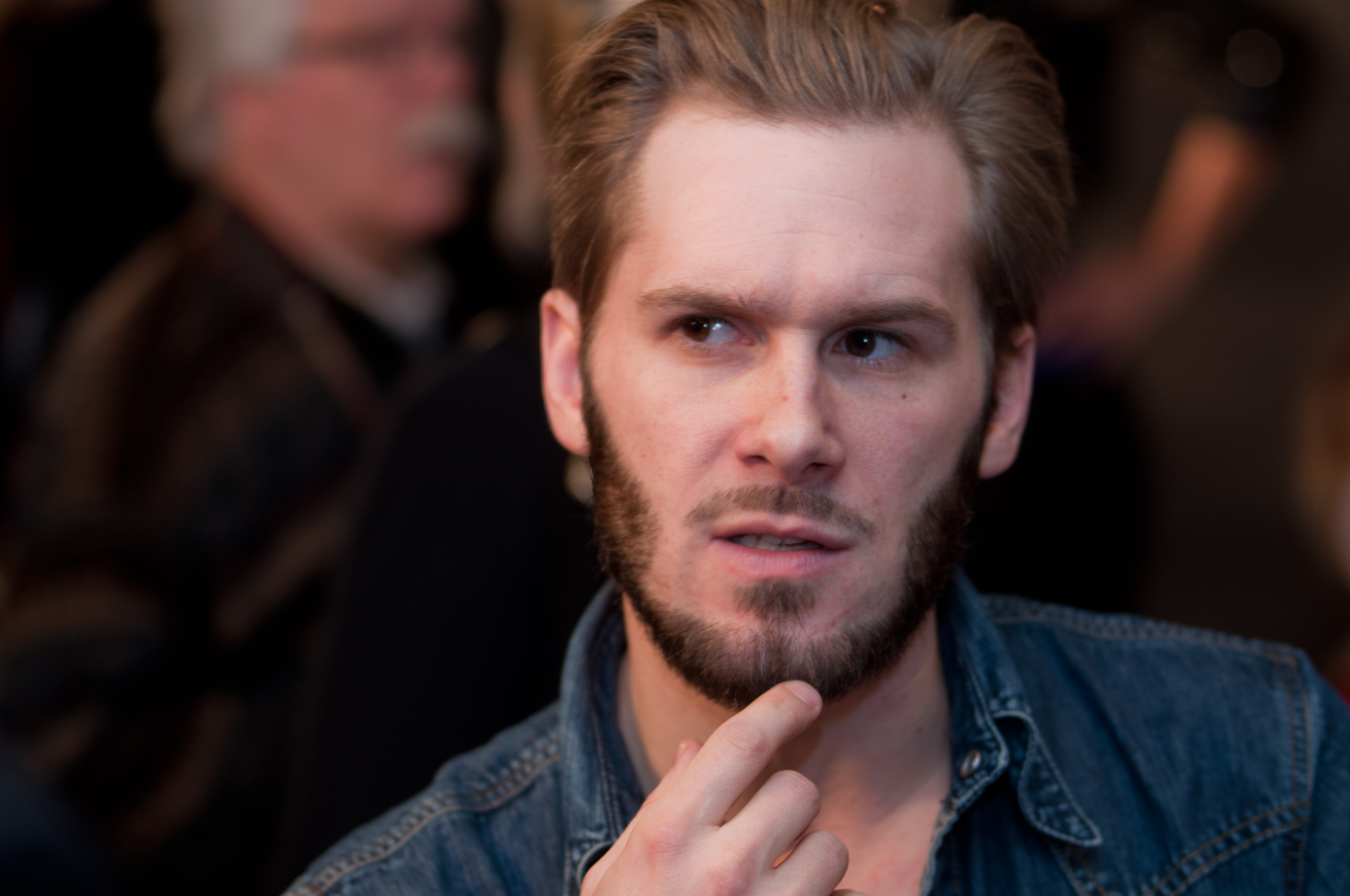
Christian Walz, producer and writer of "Jag kommer"

Maggio said the writing process for "Jag kommer" was not emotional compared to that of the other tracks of Satan i gatan, because it is the only one that is not about unrequited love. She told Aftonbladet she wanted to write a song about the beginning of a romantic relationship because most of her previous tracks are about breakups. Maggio added "Jag kommer" is about realizing "you are in love" and the "stress" it causes. Maggio and Stefan Olsson wrote the song with Christian Walz, who also produced the track. Olsson played bass guitar and engineered the track with Walz, and the latter mixed it with Stefan Sundström. Erik Arvinder played violin while Robert Vadadi played guitar with Olsson.

Maggio and Walz created the melody's synthesizer sound with software sampler Kontakt using compression technique side-chain. To add distortion to the beat, Walz used the plug-in Decapitator by Soundtoys. Universal Music AB sent "Jag kommer" to Sveriges Radio P3 on 10 February 2011 and released it as the lead single from Satan i gatan for download the following day. On 21 February, the song was sent to contemporary hit radio in Norway. A remixed version by Swedish trio Mash Up International that features artist Kakan was released for downloading on 23 December 2011.

== Music and lyrics ==
"['Jag kommer'] is a love song about the stress of trying to get to the person you just discovered you are in love with, when you think someone else might be able to get ahead of you. But it obviously has a double meaning in the lyric 'Jag kommer' (I'm coming), and that's why you might associate it with [sex] as well."

— Maggio explaining the meaning of "Jag kommer" to Expressen.

"Jag kommer" is a pop rock song that runs for three minutes and 22 seconds (3:22). Its instrumentation consists of guitars, drums, a distorted synthesizer melody and looped background vocals. During the hook, Maggio sings, "Ja, jag vet att hon är söt men håll tillbaka / För, jag kommer, jag kommer, jag är nästan där" (Yes, I know she is cute but hold back / because, I'm coming, I'm coming, I'm almost there). When asked if the hook's lyrics are a double entendre, the singer said she preferred to be "suggestive" and that "Jag kommer" is open to the listener's interpretation. In other interviews, she has said the song's lyrics are ambiguous and could simply mean "to be on the way to the person you love". Maggio also said "Jag kommer" is the only happy love song she has written. According to Maria Forsström of Metro, Maggio sings about "going home tonight with someone instead of being alone".

=== Plagiarism accusations ===
After its release, Swedish publications including Aftonbladet and Sveriges Radio reported public accusations that "Jag kommer" had been plagiarized from The Strokes' "Reptilia" (2004). Maggio said although The Strokes' music had inspired the song, she did not plagiarize "Reptilia", adding "there are only eight white and five black keys on a piano, as long as you make something your way it's okay". Some journalists, including Ralph Bretzer of Arbetarbladet and Emanuel Videla of Gaffa Sweden, also noted similarities between "Jag kommer" and songs by The Strokes. The staff of Popdust compared the track's composition with the music of bands Metric and The Strokes, and likened its lyrics to the songs of Robyn. Other publications, including Festivalrykten and Norran, said "Jag kommer" is a departure from Maggio's previous soul tracks, which is due to her association with Walz.

== Critical reception ==
"Jag kommer" was well-received by music critics. Eivind August Westad Stuen of Aftenposten called it a catchy single. Annah Björk of Expressen rated the song with four wasps out of five and stated listeners might be embarrassed by its straightforwardness. Romerikes Blad's Kaja S. Knatten considered "Jag kommer" to be "more lively" than the rest of Satan i gatan, deeming its rhythm catchy. Fredrik Franzén of Gaffa Sweden described "Jag kommer" as lively and ecstatic, and Emanuel Videla of the same publication called it a euphoric track that does not represent the themes of the album. Øyvin Søraa of Oppland Arbeiderblad noted the song includes elements of the music of Swedish pop artists such as Ted Gärdestad, Harpo and Gyllene Tider, especially its light composition and "good" hook. Verdens Gang's Øynstein David Johansen rated it with five points and compared its composition with music of the 1960s and 1970s. Leif Tore Lindø of Stavanger Aftenblad called the song the best track on Satan i gatan. Per Bjurman of Aftonbladet deemed the song's lyrics "fun, smart, original and, in general, irresistible as well".

In her review of Satan i gatan, Smålandsposten's Louice Petterson considered both "Jag kommer" and the album's title track "must-hear songs". Joakim Johansson of Meny.nu said the lyrics are "sexually teasing". Sydsvenskan's Anna Hellsten considered "Jag kommer" the best track on the album, calling it a "super stylish" song with "preppy" guitars and bright vocals. Christopher Lembke of Hallandsposten said the track is an "already established pop gem". Some critics commented on Maggio's association with Walz. Lisa Appelqvist of Kristianstadsbladet said Maggio's collaboration with Walz is "a match made in heaven", especially on tracks such as "Jag kommer" and "Mitt hjärta blöder". Per Strömbro of Norran commented Maggio's shift from soul to rock is mostly evident on "Jag kommer" and that her association with Walz turned out to be a brilliant choice. Steffanee Wang of Nylon called it a Swedish pop classic.

The staff of Dagbladet named "Jag kommer" the sixth-best song by an international artist in 2011. In 2011, "Jag kommer" won the Rockbjörnen prize for Best Swedish Song, as well as the Swedish Hit of the Year award at the GAFFA Awards. It received a nomination for Song of the Year at the 2012 Grammis but lost to Avicii's "Levels". "Jag kommer" was also nominated for Song of the Year at the 2012 P3 Guld awards in Sweden.

== Commercial performance ==
"Jag kommer" debuted at number 16 on Sweden's Sverigetopplistan chart during the week of 18 February 2011. On the chart dated 6 May 2011, the track peaked at number one and the other 10 songs from Satan i gatan also appeared on the list. It stayed at the top the following week. "Jag kommer" spent 52 weeks on the Sverigetopplistan chart in 2011 and 2012. It was certified septuple platinum by the Swedish Recording Industry Association (GLF), denoting 280,000 sales in Sweden, and became the most successful track of 2011 in the country. "Jag kommer" also reached number four on the Realtones chart, on which it spent 42 weeks. It was Sveriges Radio P3's most-played song by a Swedish artist in 2011, with 250 plays, and the second most-played overall, behind Adele's "Set Fire to the Rain". "Jag kommer" was the most-streamed song on Spotify in Sweden during 2011 and was the 10th best-selling track in the country that year. It was the ninth most-played song on Swedish radio during the second half of 2011 and the first half of 2012 with 52,534 plays.

In Norway, "Jag kommer" entered the Topp 20 Singles chart at number 20 on the ninth week of 2011, becoming Maggio's second entry after "Måndagsbarn" in 2009. It re-entered the chart five times before peaking at number 12 on its 10th-and-last week on the Topp 20 Singles chart. "Jag kommer" was certified double platinum by the International Federation of the Phonographic Industry (IFPI) on 21 November 2011 for selling 20,000 units in Norway. It was the second-most played track of 2011 on the radio station NRK P3 and the 29th-most streamed song of that year on Spotify in Norway.

== Music video ==
Robinovich directed the music video for "Jag kommer", which was released on YouTube on 11 April 2011, and premiered two days later in Sweden and Norway. The video begins with a shot of Maggio removing hair from her palms with tweezers, which Sveriges Radio's Kitty Jutbring said is related to the popular myth that one "might get hair in their palms if they masturbate too much". Following this, Maggio enters her bedroom, changes her clothes, then struggles to leave her apartment because each time she reaches the door, the moving floor carries her away from it.

According to Maggio, "The idea of the video is that I am stuck in an apartment that just won't let me out. I try to get to the exit, but the house keeps physically moving. All of this [the furniture] is stuck to the house, so everything moves at once, while you are standing still, but it feels as if you're moving backwards, like in a funhouse. It's the inclining Lustiga Huset." The house designed for the music video weighed three tonnes and needed eight people to push it during filming. The set was supported with car jacks because it tended to lean inwards. While recording the bedroom scene, Maggio hit her head on a wall, and she elaborated on the incident; "I sat by the bed and the wall came and hit the back of my head. It's like a childhood reflex that you get a strong urge to cry when you hurt your head badly, so I had to suppress that. But that's about the most dramatic thing that has happened, so I'll survive." Jutbring said she liked the video and compared it with a dream in which "you must do something but you never get there".

== Live performances and media use ==
Maggio has performed "Jag kommer" at venues and festivals after its release. In an interview with Gaffa Norway in 2019, she said she sometimes tires of continually performing her best-known songs but she enjoys playing "what the audience wants to hear" because their reception and "energy is so good". She added; "If 'Jag kommer' was my only hit, then I would probably hate it, of course". Maggio performed the song on 2 May 2011 at the Popsalongen show at NRK P3 in Norway, and on 30 June 2011 at the Peace & Love festival in Borlänge, Sweden. According to Markus Larsson of Aftonbladet, Maggio's Peace & Love performance was the best of the festival's repertoire and the public's reception was a "collective orgasm". Other 2011 performances of the song occurred on 12 July at the Allsång på Skansen show in Skansen, Stockholm; on 10 August at Øyafestivalen in Oslo, Norway; and on 8 October at a nightclub gig in Karlstad—according to Marcus Grahn of Aftonbladet, "Jag kommer" overshadowed the other songs played at the nightclub concert.

On 7 February 2014, Maggio sang "Jag kommer" at Scandinavium in Gothenburg. Johan Lindqvist of Göteborgs-Posten rated the performance with five points, saying Maggio's interaction with the crowd was the "perfect balance of euphoria and elegance". On 28 June 2014, Maggio performed the track at the Bråvalla Festival in Sweden. Tina Berglund of Gaffa Sweden noted it was the best-received performance of the repertoire by the audience "as usual". On 3 June 2017, Maggio performed the song at Gröna Lund, Stockholm, wearing a white top, shorts and silver boots. Håkan Steen of Aftonbladet said "the ovation reached purely ecstatic levels" with the performance of "Jag kommer". On 2 September 2018, Maggio included the song in her show at the Popaganda festival held at the Eriksdalsbadet, Stockholm.

In 2019, Josefin Hansson covered "Jag kommer" in her audition for Swedish television show Idol.

== Track listings ==
Digital download

1. "Jag kommer" – 3:24
2. "Jag kommer" (Instrumental) – 3:24

Digital download – Mash Up International Remix

1. "Jag kommer" (Mash Up International Remix) – 3:23

== Credits and personnel ==
Credits adapted from Tidal and the liner notes of Satan i gatan.

- Veronica Maggio – lead vocals, songwriting
- Christian Walz – songwriting, production, audio engineering, mixing, background vocals
- Stefan Olsson – songwriting, audio engineering, guitar, bass
- Stefan Sundström – mixing
- Erik Arvinder – violin
- Robert Vadadi – guitar
- Ian Agate – strings engineer
- Peter Månsson – strings engineer

== Charts ==
=== Weekly charts ===
Weekly chart positions for "Jag kommer"
Chart (2011)	Peak position
Norway (VG-lista)	12
Sweden (Sverigetopplistan)	1
Sweden (Realtones)	4

=== Year-end charts ===
Year-end positions for "Jag kommer"
Chart	Year	Position
Sweden (Sverigetopplistan)	2011	1
Sweden (Sverigetopplistan)	2022	89
Sweden (Sverigetopplistan)	2023	65
Sweden (Sverigetopplistan)	2024	70
Sweden (Sverigetopplistan)	2025	91

== Certifications ==
Certifications and sales for "Jag kommer"
Region	Certification	Certified units/sales
Norway (IFPI Norway)	2× Platinum	20,000^{*}
Sweden (GLF)	7× Platinum	280,000^{‡}
^{*} Sales figures based on certification alone.^{‡} Sales+streaming figures based on certification alone.

== Release history ==
Release dates and formats for "Jag kommer"
Region	Date	Format	Label	Ref.
Sweden	10 February 2011	Contemporary hit radio	Universal Music AB	
Sweden	11 February 2011	Digital download	Universal Music AB	
Norway	11 February 2011	Digital download	Universal Music AB	
Norway	21 February 2011	Contemporary hit radio	Universal Music AB	
Norway	23 December 2011	Digital download (Mash Up International Remix)	Universal Music AB	

== Tove Lo version ==
"I'm Coming"

Single by Tove Lo

from the album Sunshine Kitty (Paw Prints Edition)
- Released: 20 March 2020
- Recorded: 2020
- Studio: Spotify Studio (Stockholm, Sweden)
- Genre: Synth-pop
- Length: 3:17
- Label: Universal
- Songwriters: Veronica Maggio; Christian Walz; Stefan Olsson; Tove Lo
- Producers: Elvira Anderfjärd; Gustav Weber Vernet

Tove Lo singles chronology
"Calling on Me" (2020)	"I'm Coming" (2020)	"Sadder Badder Cooler" (2020)

Lyric video
- "I'm Coming" on YouTube

On 20 March 2020, Swedish singer Tove Lo released an English-language version of "Jag kommer" titled "I'm Coming" as part of Spotify's Studio It's Hits playlist. On 28 April of that year, Lo performed an acoustic version of the track in Los Angeles that was broadcast by TV4. A lyric video of the performance, which was directed by Thibaut Duverneix, was uploaded to Lo's YouTube channel on 9 September 2020; it depicts Lo wearing white underwear and dancing on a bed while the lyrics are shown.

=== Recording ===
Studio It's Hits is a Spotify program in which Nordic artists are invited to record a cover, re-record one of their songs or create a new track. In early 2020, Lo was invited to Spotify's Stockholm headquarters, where she recorded a cover of "Jag kommer", one of her favorite tracks. She decided to translate it into English because she "thought it would be fun to see if the song would translate well, if it connects with me equally in English".

Lo covered "Jag kommer" because she considers it special and "it came out when everything was changing for me and my career as a songwriter took off when I signed a contract to Warner Chappell". Elvira Anderfjärd and Gustav Weber Vernet produced "I'm Coming"; Anderfjärd sang background vocals and Vernet played keyboards. Simon Sigfridsson mixed and recorded the track with the assistance of Maria Bergström, while Sören von Malmborg mastered it. Johan Salomonsson played the guitar while Karl Hovmark played the drums.

=== Composition ===
In contrast to the original's pop-rock sound, "I'm Coming" is a synth-pop track with a "throbbing" beat. It is three minutes and 16 seconds long and has a tempo of 119 beats per minute. The track samples the "oh oh" line from Lo's 2013 song "Habits (Stay High)". Lo approached a dream-dance sound with her collaborators, resembling her style of music. For Lo, it was important "not to lose the magic of the song but make something sonically new". A writer of Aftonbladet said Lo's cover was updated and "destined to the dance-floor with pulsing synths". Angie Martoccio of Rolling Stone commented the track is "ideal for the dance floor".

=== Release ===
On 18 March 2020, using the hashtag "#imcoming", Lo announced through her Instagram account she would release a new song in two days. "I'm Coming" was initially released as a single exclusively on Spotify on 20 March. Universal Music sent the track to contemporary hit radio stations in Norway the same day and to similar radio stations in Sweden seven days later. "I'm Coming" was included on the 2020 reissue of Lo's fourth studio album Sunshine Kitty: Paw Prints Edition (2019).

=== Reception ===
Mike Wass of Idolator called "I'm Coming" a "shimmery, synthpop anthem", adding; "It goes without saying that [Lo] does the [original] justice." Martoccio deemed it a blissful pop track, and Stereogum's James Rettig said it keeps the same "starry-eyed" energy of "Jag kommer". Owen Maxwell of Ottawa Life Magazine compared "I'm Coming" with the music of Robyn, and commented it does not "carry the brutality [Lo's] lyricism usually does". Editors of Nylon, Virgin Radio and Radio.com included the song on their respective lists of the best releases of the week of 20 March 2020, while the staff of Pure Charts selected "I'm Coming" among their favorite songs from March 2020, comparing it with the music of Robyn.

The song debuted and peaked at number 12 on the Sverigetopplistan chart. It surpassed the number 13 peak of "Stay High", becoming Lo's highest charting single as a lead artist in Sweden. The song spent eight weeks on the chart. "I'm Coming" further charted at number nine on the Svenskt Topp 20 chart, which ranks the most popular tracks by Swedish artists in the country. "I'm Coming" peaked at number 34 on Norway's Topp 20 Singles chart and at number 30 on the New Zealand Hot Singles chart, spending one week on each.

=== Charts ===
Weekly chart positions for "I'm Coming"
Chart (2020)	Peak position
New Zealand Hot Singles (RMNZ)	30
Norway (VG-lista)	34
Sweden (Sverigetopplistan)	12
Sweden (Svenskt Topp 20)	9

=== Release history ===
Release dates and formats for "I'm Coming"
Region	Date	Format	Label	Ref.
Various	20 March 2020	Streaming	Universal Music AB	
Norway	20 March 2020	Contemporary hit radio	Universal Music AB	
Sweden	27 March 2020	Contemporary hit radio	Universal Music AB	
