= Längesen =

Single by Petter featuring Veronica Maggio
- Released: 28 June 2010
- Recorded: 2010
- Genre: Pop
- Length: 4:33
- Label: Universal Music
- Songwriter(s): Petter Askergren, Jan P Collen, Veronica Maggio

Petter singles chronology
"Gör min dag" (2010)	"Längesen" (2010)

Veronica Maggio singles chronology
"17 år" (2009)	"Längesen" (2010)	"Jag kommer" (2011)

"Längesen" is a single by Swedish Rap artist Petter, featuring vocals from Veronica Maggio. It was released in Sweden as a digital download on 28 June 2010. The song peaked at number 20 on the Swedish Singles Chart.

== Music video ==
A music video to accompany the release of "Längesen" was first released onto YouTube on 24 June 2010 at a total length of four minutes and thirty-four seconds.

== Track listing ==
Digital download

1. "Längesen" (feat. Veronica Maggio) - 4:33

== Charts ==
=== Weekly charts ===
Chart (2010)	Peak position
Sweden (Sverigetopplistan)	20

Chart (2022)	Peak position
Sweden (Sverigetopplistan)	2

=== Year-end charts ===
Chart (2010)	Position
Sweden (Sverigetopplistan)	58
Chart (2011)	Position
Sweden (Sverigetopplistan)	75
Chart (2022)	Position
Sweden (Sverigetopplistan)	37

== Release history ==
Region	Date	Format	Label
Sweden	28 June 2010	Digital Download	Universal Music
