= 17-AR =

17-AR may refer to:

- 17-AR, a fictional star system in Wing Commander: Privateer
- 17 år, a single by Swedish singer Veronica Maggio
