= Stopp =

Single by Veronica Maggio

from the album Och vinnaren är...
- Released: 6 May 2008
- Recorded: 2008
- Genre: Pop
- Length: 3:16
- Label: Universal Music
- Songwriter(s): Oskar Linnros, Veronica Maggio

Veronica Maggio singles chronology
| "Måndagsbarn" (2008) | "Stopp" (2008) | "17 år" (2009) |

"Stopp" is a single by Swedish singer Veronica Maggio, from her second Studio album Och vinnaren är... It was released in Sweden as a digital download on 6 May 2008. The song peaked at number 30 on the Swedish Singles Chart.

== Music video ==
A music video to accompany the release of "Stopp" was first released onto YouTube on 29 May 2008 at a total length of three minutes and thirteen seconds.

== Track listing ==
Digital download

1. "Stopp" - 3:16

== Chart performance ==
| Chart (2008) | Peak position |
|---|---|
| Sweden (Sverigetopplistan) | 30 |

== Release history ==
| Region | Date | Format | Label |
|---|---|---|---|
| Sweden | 6 May 2008 | Digital Download | Universal Music |
