= Wonderchild =

Single by Christian Walz

from the album Paint by Numbers
- Released: September 2004
- Songwriters: Christian Walz, Patrik Berger

"Wonderchild" is a 2004 single recorded by Christian Walz.

The single was included on Walz's Paint By Numbers album, released in 2004.

== Charts ==
=== Weekly charts ===
Weekly chart performance for "Wonderchild"
Chart (2004–06)	Peak position
Belgium (Ultratop 50 Flanders)	44
Netherlands (Dutch Top 40)	11
Netherlands (Single Top 100)	17
Norway (VG-lista)	8
Sweden (Sverigetopplistan)	8

=== Year-end charts ===
Year-end chart rankings for "Wonderchild"
Chart	Position
Netherlands (Dutch Top 40, 2005)	72
Netherlands (Dutch Top 40, 2006)	167
Netherlands (Single Top 100, 2005)	79
Sweden (Sverigetopplistan, 2004)	73
