= Vi mot världen =

Single by Veronica Maggio

from the album Den första är alltid gratis
- Released: 2 May 2016
- Recorded: 2014/15
- Genre: Pop
- Length: 3:12
- Label: Universal Music
- Songwriter(s): Veronica Maggio, Salem Al Fakir, Magnus Lidehall, Vincent Pontare

Veronica Maggio singles chronology
"Ayahuasca" (2016)	"Vi mot världen" (2016)	"20 Questions (From Bergman's Reliquary)" (2018)

"Vi mot världen" (Swedish for "Us against the world") is a single by Swedish singer Veronica Maggio. It was released in Sweden as a digital download on 2 May 2016 as the third single from her fifth studio album Den första är alltid gratis (2016). The song peaked at number 10 on the Swedish Singles Chart.

== Track listing ==
Digital download
No.	Title	Length
1.	"Vi mot världen"	3:12

== Charts ==
=== Weekly charts ===
Chart (2016)	Peak position
Sweden (Sverigetopplistan)	10

=== Year-end charts ===
2016 year-end position for "Vi mot världen"
Chart (2016)	Position
Sweden (Sverigetopplistan)	84

== Release history ==
Region	Date	Format	Label
Sweden	2 May 2016	Digital Download	Universal Music
