= Vatten och bröd =

Studio album by Veronica Maggio
- Released: 6 September 2006
- Recorded: 2005–06
- Genre: Pop
- Label: Universal Music AB
- Producer: Christian Walz

Veronica Maggio chronology
Vatten och bröd (2006)	Och vinnaren är... (2008)

Singles from Vatten och bröd
- 1. "Dumpa mig" Released: 20 March 2006; 2. "Nöjd?" Released: 5 July 2006; 3. "Havanna Mamma" Released: 25 October 2006

Vatten och bröd (Swedish for Water and Bread) is the debut studio album released by Swedish singer and songwriter Veronica Maggio. It was released in Sweden on 6 September 2006 through Universal Music AB and debuted at number 18 on the Swedish Albums Chart, while peaking at number 14. The album was recorded and produced by Maggio in the studio of Christian Walz in Östermalm, Stockholm.

== Singles ==
- "Dumpa mig" was released on 20 March 2006 as the lead single from the album. It peaked at number 14 on the Swedish Singles Chart.
- "Nöjd?" was released on 5 July 2006 as the second single from the album. It peaked at number 6 on the Swedish Singles Chart.
- "Havanna Mamma" was released on 25 October 2006 as the third single from the album.

== Track listing ==
Standard listing
No.	Title	Length
1.	"Ingenting kvar" (Nothing Left)	2:47
2.	"Havanna Mamma" (Havana Mama)	3:52
3.	"Dumpa mig" (Dump Me)	3:39
4.	"Vi har, vi har" (We Have, We Have)	3:44
5.	"Kan inte säga nej" (Can't Say No)	3:42
6.	"Kvällens sista cigarrett" (The Last Cigarette of the Night)	4:14
7.	"Månskensregn" (Moonlight Rain)	2:54
8.	"Nöjd?" (Satisfied?)	3:03
9.	"Gå nu" (Go Now)	3:13
10.	"Ballad om vintern" (Ballad of Winter)	2:18

== Charts ==
Chart (2006/07)	Peak position
Sweden (Sverigetopplistan)	14

== Release history ==
Region	Date	Format	Label
Sweden	6 September 2006	Digital Download	Universal Music AB
