= Ayahuasca (Veronica Maggio song) =

2016 single by Veronica Maggio

Single by Veronica Maggio

from the album Den första är alltid gratis
- Released: 28 April 2016
- Recorded: 2014/15
- Genre: Pop
- Length: 3:44
- Label: Universal Music
- Songwriter(s): Kylin Theodor Johan Arvidsson, Eric Olof Christer Holmberg, Johansen Joel Tore Janson, Karl Oskar Crook, Veronica Maggio, Gustav Webe Vernet

Veronica Maggio singles chronology
"Den första är alltid gratis" (2016)	"Ayahuasca" (2016)	"Vi mot världen" (2016)

"Ayahuasca" is a single by Swedish singer Veronica Maggio. It was released in Sweden as a digital download on 28 April 2016 as the second single from her fifth studio album Den första är alltid gratis (2016). The song peaked at number 35 on the Swedish Singles Chart.

== Track listing ==
Digital download
No.	Title	Length
1.	"Ayahuasca"	3:44

== Charts ==
=== Weekly charts ===
Chart (2016)	Peak position
Sweden (Sverigetopplistan)	35

== Release history ==
Region	Date	Format	Label
Sweden	28 April 2016	Digital Download	Universal Music
