= Välkommen in =

Single by Veronica Maggio

from the album Satan i gatan
- Released: 6 June 2011
- Recorded: 2011
- Genre: Pop
- Length: 3:13
- Label: Universal Music
- Songwriters: Christian Walz; Patrik Berggren; Veronica Maggio; Paloma Faith
- Producer: Christian Walz

Veronica Maggio singles chronology
| "Jag kommer" (2011) | "Välkommen in" (2011) | "Mitt hjärta blöder" (2012) |

"Välkommen in" (Swedish for "Welcome in") is a single by Swedish singer Veronica Maggio, from her third studio album Satan i gatan. It was released in Sweden as a digital download on 6 June 2011. The song peaked at number two on the Swedish Singles Chart.

== Music and lyrics ==
The song is about a party held in Veronica's house. It was too fun that nobody wanted to leave, yet time kept going by.

Some lyrics from Italian song "La canzone del sole" were mentioned, referring her Italian father playing it.

Spelar pappas skiva ifrån '69

De sjunger, "cosa vuol dir sona una donna ormai

O mare nero, o mare nero, o mare ne"

== Track listing ==
Digital download

1. "Välkommen In" (Radio Edit) – 3:13
2. "Välkommen In" (Instrumental Version) – 3:35

== Credits and personnel ==
- Lead vocals – Veronica Maggio
- Producers – Christian Walz
- Music/Lyrics – Christian Walz, Patrik Berggren, Veronica Maggio, Paloma Faith

== Charts ==
=== Weekly charts ===
| Chart (2011) | Peak position |
|---|---|
| Sweden (Sverigetopplistan) | 2 |

=== Year-end charts ===
| Chart | Year | Position |
|---|---|---|
| Sweden (Sverigetopplistan) | 2011 | 17 |
| Sweden (Sverigetopplistan) | 2022 | 56 |
| Sweden (Sverigetopplistan) | 2023 | 36 |
| Sweden (Sverigetopplistan) | 2024 | 49 |
| Sweden (Sverigetopplistan) | 2025 | 39 |

== Release history ==
| Region | Date | Format | Label |
|---|---|---|---|
| Sweden | 6 June 2011 | Digital Download | Universal Music |
