= Satan i gatan =

Studio album by Veronica Maggio
- Released: 27 April 2011
- Recorded: 2010–2011
- Genre: Synthpop, dance, soul
- Length: 34:44
- Label: Universal Music AB
- Producer: Christian Walz

Veronica Maggio chronology
Och vinnaren är... (2008)	Satan i gatan (2011)	Handen i fickan fast jag bryr mig (2013)

Singles from Satan i gatan
- 1. "Jag kommer" Released: 11 February 2011; 2. "Välkommen in" Released: 6 June 2011; 3. "Mitt hjärta blöder" Released: 25 January 2012

Satan i gatan (Swedish for Satan in the Street, a rhyming, idiomatic expression of mild surprise) is the third studio album released by Swedish singer and songwriter Veronica Maggio. It was released in Sweden on 27 April 2011 through Universal Music AB and debuted at number one on the Swedish Albums Chart. The title is a Swedish expression which generally means "damn". The album follows on from her 2006 debut Vatten & bröd and her 2008 follow-up Och vinnaren är.... The album was recorded and produced by Maggio in the studio of Christian Walz in Östermalm, Stockholm. Maggio wrote all the lyrics, a process that took almost a year, whereas all music was written by Christian Walz, except for "Vi kommer alltid ha Paris" the music of which was composed by Markus Krunegård.

The album contains eleven tracks, with a bonus track available via iTunes called "Vad gör vi ikväll", a song written by Maggio, Walz and Krunegård. Also on 18 April 2011, Maggio invited Maggio fans to download the song "Välkommen in" from the album through the telephone operator Comviq. The song "Alla mina låtar" (meaning All my songs) resulted in speculation among music reviewers as being a response to her former boyfriend Oskar Linnros' song "Från och med du" (meaning "Starting [with] you", a play of words on the phrase "Starting now") when Linnros had sung "... one is broken, one is yours, this is the end of our movie." Maggio counters this with singing "You are crushed and I go free, it's all about you".

The song "Välkommen in" incorporates lyrics from Lucio Battisti's "La canzone del Sole".

== Chart performance ==
The album debuted atop the Swedish Albums Chart on 6 May 2011. It remained at number one for two more weeks. The album's first single "Jag kommer" debuted at number sixteen on the Swedish Singles Chart on 18 February the same year. It rose to number four the next week and then began to drop down the rankings. With the release of the album, the single recorded a new peak of number one on 6 May. The release of the album also saw ten further tracks chart, based on downloads only in Sweden. "Satan i gatan" has peaked at number two; "Snälla bli min" at number six; "Mitt hjärta blöder" at number five; "Välkommen in" at eleven; "Inga kläder" at twelve; "Vi kommer alltid ha Paris" and "Sju sorger" at eighteen; "Alla mina låtar" at #24; "Finns det en så finns det flera" at #27; and "Lördagen den femtonde mars" at number thirty.

== Track listing ==
Standard listing
No.	Title	Writer(s)	Length
1.	"Satan i gatan" (Satan in the Street)	Veronica Maggio, Christian Walz	3:15
2.	"Välkommen in" (Welcome In)	Maggio, Walz, Patrik Berggren, Paloma Faith	3:32
3.	"Jag kommer" (I'm Coming)	Maggio, Walz, Stefan Olsson	3:22
4.	"Mitt hjärta blöder" (My Heart Bleeds)	Maggio, Walz	3:21
5.	"Vi kommer alltid ha Paris" (We'll Always Have Paris)	Maggio, Markus Krunegård	2:36
6.	"Inga kläder" (No Clothes)	Maggio, Walz	3:21
7.	"Alla mina låtar" (All My Songs)	Maggio, Walz	3:29
8.	"Snälla bli min" (Please Be Mine)	Maggio, Walz	2:39
9.	"Sju sorger" (Seven Sorrows)	Maggio, Walz, Carl Wikström Ask	4:00
10.	"Finns det en så finns det flera" (If There's One, There Are Several)	Maggio, Walz, Krunegård	3:57
11.	"Lördagen den femtonde mars" (Saturday the Fifteenth of March)	Maggio, Walz	1:06

iTunes Bonus Track
No.	Title	Writer(s)	Length
12.	"Vad gör vi ikväll" (What Are We Doing Tonight)	Maggio, Walz, Krunegård	4:15

== Charts ==
=== Weekly charts ===
Chart (2011)	Peak position
Danish Albums (Hitlisten)	24
Finnish Albums (Suomen virallinen lista)	33
Norwegian Albums (VG-lista)	2
Swedish Albums (Sverigetopplistan)	1

=== Year-end charts ===
Chart	Year	Position
Swedish Albums (Sverigetopplistan)	2011	1
Swedish Albums (Sverigetopplistan)	2012	45
Swedish Albums (Sverigetopplistan)	2013	57
Swedish Albums (Sverigetopplistan)	2014	26
Swedish Albums (Sverigetopplistan)	2015	30
Swedish Albums (Sverigetopplistan)	2016	34
Swedish Albums (Sverigetopplistan)	2017	22
Swedish Albums (Sverigetopplistan)	2018	28
Swedish Albums (Sverigetopplistan)	2019	18
Swedish Albums (Sverigetopplistan)	2020	20
Swedish Albums (Sverigetopplistan)	2021	9
Swedish Albums (Sverigetopplistan)	2022	6
Swedish Albums (Sverigetopplistan)	2023	3
Swedish Albums (Sverigetopplistan)	2024	5
Swedish Albums (Sverigetopplistan)	2025	8
