= Den första är alltid gratis =

Single by Veronica Maggio

from the album Den första är alltid gratis
- Released: 17 March 2016
- Recorded: 2014/15
- Genre: Pop
- Length: 3:41
- Label: Universal Music
- Songwriter(s): Salem Al Fakir * Klas Oskar Gullbrand * Veronica Maggio * Vincent Pontare

Veronica Maggio singles chronology
"Låtsas som det regnar" (2014)	"Den första är alltid gratis" (2016)	"Ayahuasca" (2016)

"Den första är alltid gratis" is a single by Swedish singer Veronica Maggio. It was released in Sweden as a digital download on 17 March 2016 as the lead single from her fifth studio album Den första är alltid gratis (2016). The song peaked at number 16 on the Swedish Singles Chart.

== Track listing ==
Digital download
No.	Title	Length
1.	"Den första är alltid gratis"	3:41

== Charts ==
=== Weekly charts ===
Chart (2016)	Peak position
Sweden (Sverigetopplistan)	16

== Release history ==
Region	Date	Format	Label
Sweden	17 March 2016	Digital Download	Universal Music
