= Den första är alltid gratis (album) =

Studio album by Veronica Maggio
- Released: 6 May 2016
- Recorded: 2014–2015
- Genre: Pop
- Label: Universal Music AB

Veronica Maggio chronology
Handen i fickan fast jag bryr mig (2013)	Den första är alltid gratis (2016)	Fiender är tråkigt (2019)

Singles from Den första är alltid gratis
- 1. "Den första är alltid gratis" Released: 17 March 2016; 2. "Ayahuasca" Released: 28 April 2016; 3. "Vi mot världen" Released: 2 May 2016

Den första är alltid gratis (English: The First (One) Is Always Free) is the fifth studio album released by Swedish singer and songwriter Veronica Maggio. The album was released in Sweden on 6 May 2016 through Universal Music AB. The album has peaked at number six in Norway and number one in Sweden.

== Singles ==
- "Den första är alltid gratis" was released as the lead single from the album on 17 March 2016. The song peaked at number 16 on the Swedish Singles Chart.
- "Ayahuasca" was released as the second single from the album on 28 April 2016. The song peaked at number 35 on the Swedish Singles Chart.
- "Vi mot världen" was released as the third single from the album on 2 May 2016. The song peaked at number ten on the Swedish Singles Chart.

== Track listing ==
Credits adapted from iTunes.

No.	Title	Length
1.	"Den första är alltid gratis" (The First One Is Always Free)	3:41
2.	"Vi mot världen" (Us Against the World)	3:12
3.	"Femton" (Fifteen)	3:32
4.	"Dom sa!" (They Said!)	3:43
5.	"Gjord av sten" (Made of Stone)	4:36
6.	"Svart sommar" (Black Summer)	3:42
7.	"Ayahuasca"	3:44
8.	"Verkligheten" (The Reality)	4:28
9.	"Storma tills vi dör" (Storm Until We Die)	3:05
10.	"Play och sen repeat" (Play and Then Repeat)	3:11
11.	"Pang Pang" (Bang Bang)	2:38
12.	"Förlorad för alltid" (Lost Forever)	3:45

== Charts ==
=== Weekly charts ===
Chart (2016)	Peak position
Finnish Albums (Suomen virallinen lista)	33
Norwegian Albums (VG-lista)	6
Swedish Albums (Sverigetopplistan)	1

=== Year-end charts ===
Chart (2016)	Position
Swedish Albums (Sverigetopplistan)	15
Chart (2017)	Position
Swedish Albums (Sverigetopplistan)	54
Chart (2019)	Position
Swedish Albums (Sverigetopplistan)	92

== Release history ==
Region	Date	Format	Label
Sweden	6 May 2016	Digital download, CD	Universal Music AB
