= Och som vanligt händer det något hemskt =

Studio album by Veronica Maggio
- Released: 20 May 2022
- Length: 35:21
- Language: Swedish
- Label: Universal Music AB

Veronica Maggio chronology
Fiender är tråkigt (2019)	Och som vanligt händer det något hemskt (2022)

Singles from Och som vanligt händer det något hemskt
- 1. "Se mig" Released: 28 May 2021; 2. "Varsomhelst/Närsomhelst" Released: 3 September 2021; 3. "På en buss" Released: 22 October 2021; 4. "Höghusdrömmar" Released: 18 March 2022; 5. "Heaven med dig" Released: 13 May 2022; 6. "Låt mig gå" Released: 18 November 2022

Och som vanligt händer det något hemskt (Swedish for 'And as Usual Something Terrible Happens') is the seventh studio album by Swedish singer and songwriter Veronica Maggio. The album was released in two chapters, with the first chapter released on 29 October 2021. It contained six tracks including the singles "Se mig", "Varsomhelst/Närsomhelst" and "På en buss". The full album was released on 20 May 2022, with six additional tracks including the singles "Heaven med dig", "Höghusdrömmar" and "Låt mig gå".

== Promotion and release ==
On 28 May 2021, "Se mig" was released as the album's lead single. Maggio described the song as having a mood of "longing to explode and feel great emotions again", with a new perspective as a result of the COVID-19 pandemic. The single debuted and peaked at number five in the Swedish singles chart. It was the album's most successful single, earning a platinum certification and appearing at number 46 on the 2021 year-end Swedish singles chart.

The second and third singles "Varsomhelst/Närsomhelst" and "På en buss" were released in September and October 2021, ahead of the release of the first chapter of the album as an extended play on 28 October 2021. Och som vanligt händer det något hemskt (Kapitel 1) debuted at number 7 in the Swedish albums chart.

On 13 March 2022, the tracks "Höghusdrömmar" and "070-xxxx xxx" were released in anticipation of the full album release. On 13 May 2022, "Heaven med dig" was released as the fifth single from the album, peaking at number 18 in Sweden. The album released the following week, with the six tracks from Chapter 1, the three 2022 singles and 3 new tracks in a revised track listing order. On the week of album release, Låt mig gå debuted and peaked at number 19 on the Swedish singles chart, becoming the album's fourth track to reach the Swedish top 20.

== Critical reception ==
Och som vanligt händer det något hemskt received generally positive reviews from critics. In their review of the first chapter, Aftonbladet praised Maggio's perfection of her craft, highlighting tracks such as "Se mig" and "Varsomhelst/Närsomhelst" as a reflection of her ability to craft hits that connect with listeners. However, they highlighted the lack of growth and evolution from her previous work. Choosing "Daddy Issues" as the best of the six tracks, they highlighted its new perspective in comparison to the relativity familiarity of the other tracks. This impression of having become "a little too good at sounding like herself" remained with the release of the full album. While Aftonbladet praised the new tracks as highlights, they criticised the rollout technique, with the album release bringing only two new songs and an intro track.

In their review, Kult also highlighted the familiarity of themes such as "messy youth and bad decisions" in Veronica Maggio's music. However, they praised Och som vanligt händer det något hemskt showing deeper self-awareness and genuineness than its predecessor, Fiender är tråkigt, which they had labelled as thematically unrepresentative of Maggio's age.

== Track listing ==
Och som vanligt händer det något hemskt track listing
No.	Title	Writer(s)	Producer(s)	Length
1.	"Innan dig" (Before You)	Veronica Maggio; Agrin Rahmani; Litens Anton Nilsson; Simon Hassle	Rahmani; Hassle	0:40
2.	"Se mig" (See Me)	Maggio; Rahmani; Nilsson; Hassle; Louise Lennartsson	Rahmani; Hassle	3:18
3.	"Låt mig gå" (Let Me Go)	Maggio; Johannes Runemark	Runemark	3:06
4.	"070-xxxx xxx"	Maggio; Elias Kapari	Kapari	4:00
5.	"Varsomhelst/Närsomhelst" (Anywhere/Anytime)	Maggio; Rahmani; Nilsson; Hassle	Rahmani; Hassle	2:59
6.	"Höghusdrömmar" (Highrise Dreams)	Maggio; Kapari; Nilsson; Hassle	Hassle	2:23
7.	"Fint i mörker" (Pretty in Darkness)	Maggio; Hassle; Frida Sundemo; Joel Humlén; Markus Krunegård	Hassle; Benjamin Johansson	3:20
8.	"Förlorat mot världen" (Lost Against the World)	Maggio; Nilsson; Lennartsson; Carl Silvergran; Felix Flygare Floderer	Silvergran; Floderer	3:06
9.	"Var är du?" (Where Are You?)	Maggio; Johan Lindbrandt	Lindbrandt	3:14
10.	"Heaven med dig" (Heaven With You)	Maggio; Kapari; Nilsson; Krunegård	Kapari	3:03
11.	"Daddy Issues"	Maggio; Runemark; Amanda Bergman; Maja Francis	Runemark	3:18
12.	"På en buss" (On a Bus)	Maggio; Rahmani; Nilsson; Hassle	Rahmani; Hassle	2:47
Total length:				35:21

== Charts ==
=== Weekly charts ===
Weekly chart performance for Och som vanligt händer det något hemskt
Chart (2022)	Peak position
Swedish Albums (Sverigetopplistan)	3

=== Year-end charts ===
Year-end chart performance for Och som vanligt händer det något hemskt
Chart	Year	Position
Swedish Albums (Sverigetopplistan)	2022	50
Swedish Albums (Sverigetopplistan)	2023	61
