= Dumpa mig =

Single by Veronica Maggio

from the album Vatten och bröd
- Released: 20 March 2006
- Recorded: 2006
- Genre: Pop
- Length: 3:38
- Label: Universal Music

Veronica Maggio singles chronology
"Dumpa mig" (2006)	"Nöjd?" (2006)

"Dumpa mig" is the debut single by Swedish singer Veronica Maggio, from her debut studio album Vatten och bröd. It was released in Sweden as a digital download on 20 March 2006. The song peaked at number 14 on the Swedish Singles Chart.

== Track listing ==
Digital download

1. "Dumpa mig" (Radio Version) – 3:38
2. "Dumpa mig" (Extended Version) – 4:21

== Charts ==
Chart (2006)	Peak position
Sweden (Sverigetopplistan)	14

== Release history ==
Region	Date	Format	Label
Sweden	20 March 2006	Digital Download	Universal Music
