= Nöjd? =

Single by Veronica Maggio

from the album Vatten och bröd
- Released: 5 July 2006
- Recorded: 2006
- Genre: Pop
- Length: 3:02
- Label: Universal Music
- Songwriter: Stefan Gräslund
- Producer: Stefan Gräslund

Veronica Maggio singles chronology
"Dumpa mig" (2006)	"Nöjd?" (2006)	"Havanna mamma" (2006)

"Nöjd?" is a single by Swedish singer Veronica Maggio, from her debut studio album Vatten och bröd. It was released in Sweden as a digital download on 5 July 2006. The song peaked at number 6 on the Swedish Singles Chart. The song was written and produced by Stefan Gräslund.

== Track listing ==
Digital download

1. "Nöjd?" (Radio Version) – 3:02
2. "Nöjd?" (Polyphonics Re-Shuffle) – 3:51
3. "Nöjd?" (Spånka NKPG Remix) – 6:05
4. "Dumpa mig" (Up Hygh's Blast From The Blast The Past Remix) – 4:03

== Credits and personnel ==
- Lead vocals – Veronica Maggio
- Producers – Stefan Gräslund
- Music/Lyrics – Stefan Gräslund
- Label: Universal Music

== Charts ==
Chart (2006)	Peak position
Sweden (Sverigetopplistan)	6

== Release history ==
Region	Date	Format	Label
Sweden	5 July 2006	Digital Download	Universal Music
