= Mitt hjärta blöder =

Single by Veronica Maggio

from the album Satan i gatan
- Released: 25 January 2012
- Recorded: 2011
- Genre: Pop
- Length: 3:20
- Label: Universal Music
- Songwriter(s): Christian Walz, Veronica Maggio
- Producer(s): Christian Walz

Veronica Maggio singles chronology
"Välkommen in" (2011)	"Mitt hjärta blöder" (2012)	"Sergels torg" (2013)

"Mitt hjärta blöder" (Swedish for "My heart bleeds") is a single by Swedish singer Veronica Maggio, from her third studio album Satan i gatan. It was released in Sweden as a digital download on 25 January 2012. The song peaked at number 5 on the Swedish Singles Chart.

== Music and lyrics ==
Lyrically the song speaks of a lost relationship that causes a lot of heartbreak. The narrator wants to go back there.

== Track listing ==
1. "Mitt hjärta blöder" – 3:20
2. "Mitt hjärta blöder" (Walz Guld Remix) – 3:18
3. "Dumpa mig" (2012 Version) – 3:50

== Credits and personnel ==
- Lead vocals – Veronica Maggio
- Producers – Christian Walz
- Music/Lyrics – Christian Walz, Veronica Maggio
- Label: Universal Music

== Charts ==
=== Weekly charts ===
Chart (2011/12)	Peak position
Sweden (Sverigetopplistan)	5

=== Year-end charts ===
Chart (2011)	Position
Sweden (Sverigetopplistan)	52

== Release history ==
Region	Date	Format	Label
Sweden	25 January 2012	Digital Download	Universal Music
