= Fiender är tråkigt =

Studio album by Veronica Maggio
- Released: 27 September 2019
- Genre: Pop
- Length: 33:50
- Label: Universal Music AB

Veronica Maggio chronology
Den första är alltid gratis (2016)	Fiender är tråkigt (2019)	Och som vanligt händer det något hemskt (2022)

Singles from Fiender är tråkigt
- 1. "Kurt Cobain" Released: 22 March 2019; 2. "Tillfälligheter" Released: 3 May 2019; 3. "5 minuter" Released: 9 August 2016; 4. "Fiender är tråkigt" Released: 6 September 2019

Fiender är tråkigt (English: Enemies Are Boring) is the sixth studio album by Swedish singer and songwriter Veronica Maggio. The album was released in Sweden on 27 September 2019 through Universal Music AB. The album peaked at number one in Sweden and number forty in Norway.

== Track listing ==
Fiender är tråkigt track listing
No.	Title	Writer(s)	Producer(s)	Length
1.	"Kurt Cobain"	Veronica Maggio; Joakim Berg; Simon Hassle	Maggio; Berg; Hassle	3:30
2.	"Solen har gått ner" (The Sun Has Set)	Maggio; Berg; Hassle	Berg; Hassle	3:36
3.	"Tillfälligheter" (Coincidences)	Maggio; Berg; Hassle; Agrin Rahmani	Berg; Hassle; Rahmani	3:47
4.	"Jag kastar bort mitt liv" (I'm Throwing My Life Away)	Maggio; Berg; Hassle	Berg; Hassle	3:43
5.	"En timme till" (One More Hour)	Maggio; Berg; Hassle; Rahmani	Berg; Hassle; Rahmani	3:38
6.	"Fiender är tråkigt" (Enemies Are Boring)	Maggio; Berg; Hassle	Berg; Hassle	3:41
7.	"Där hjärtat satt förut" (Where the Heart Used to Be)	Maggio; Berg; Hassle; Rahmani	Berg; Hassle; Rahmani	2:57
8.	"Rosa drinkar och champagne" (Pink Drinks and Champagne)	Maggio; Berg; Hassle	Berg; Hassle	3:17
9.	"5 minuter" (5 minutes)	Maggio; Rahmani	Rahmani	2:50
10.	"Vilken sekund som helst" (Any Second)	Maggio; Berg; Hassle	Berg; Hassle	2:51
Total length:				33:50

== Charts ==
=== Weekly charts ===
Weekly chart performance for Fiender är tråkigt
Chart (2019)	Peak position
Norwegian Albums (VG-lista)	40
Swedish Albums (Sverigetopplistan)	1

=== Year-end charts ===
Year-end chart performance for Fiender är tråkigt
Chart	Year	Position
Swedish Albums (Sverigetopplistan)	2019	24
Swedish Albums (Sverigetopplistan)	2020	5
Swedish Albums (Sverigetopplistan)	2021	21
Swedish Albums (Sverigetopplistan)	2022	72
Swedish Albums (Sverigetopplistan)	2023	49
Swedish Albums (Sverigetopplistan)	2024	71
Swedish Albums (Sverigetopplistan)	2025	49

== Release history ==
Release history and formats for Fiender är tråkigt
Region	Date	Format	Label
Sweden	27 September 2019	CD; digital download; streaming	Universal Music AB
