= Och vinnaren är... =

Studio album by Veronica Maggio
- Released: 26 March 2008
- Recorded: 2007–08
- Genre: Pop
- Label: Universal Music AB
- Producer: Oskar Linnros

Veronica Maggio chronology
Vatten och bröd (2006)	Och vinnaren är... (2008)	Satan i gatan (2011)

Singles from Och vinnaren är...
- 1. "Måndagsbarn" Released: February 11, 2008; 2. "Stopp" Released: May 6, 2008; 3. "17 år" Released: 2009

Och vinnaren är... (Swedish for And the Winner Is...) is the second studio album released by Swedish singer and songwriter Veronica Maggio. It was released in Sweden on 26 March 2008 through Universal Music AB and debuted at number 12 on the Swedish Albums Chart, peaking at number 7.

== Singles ==
- "Måndagsbarn" was released on 11 February 2008 as the lead single from the album. It peaked at number 23 on the Swedish Singles Chart.
- "Stopp" was released on 6 May 2008 as the second single from the album. It peaked at number 30 on the Swedish Singles Chart.
- "17 år" was released in 2009 as the third single from the album. It peaked at number 19 on the Swedish Singles Chart.

== Track listing ==
Standard listing
No.	Title	Length
1.	"Vinnaren" (The Winner)	2:33
2.	"Gammal sång" (Old Song)	3:27
3.	"Ingen kommer undan (Inte ens i Sverige)" (No One Gets Away (Not Even in Sweden))	1:47
4.	"Stopp" (Stop)	3:06
5.	"I staden växer inga blommor" (In the City Grows No Flowers)	2:44
6.	"Dröm" (Dream)	1:01
7.	"V för Vendetta" (V for Vendetta)	3:34
8.	"Måndagsbarn" (Monday Child)	3:25
9.	"Jajaja" (Yeah Yeah Yeah)	3:18
10.	"17 år" (17 Years)	3:40
11.	"Inget kan ändra på det" (Nothing Can Change That)	3:24
12.	"Ridå" (Curtain)	0:40

== Charts ==
=== Weekly charts ===
Weekly chart performance for Och vinnaren är...
Chart (2008–2010)	Peak position
Norwegian Albums Chart	7
Swedish Albums Chart	7

=== Year-end charts ===
Year-end chart performance for Och vinnaren är...
Chart	Year	Position
Swedish Albums (Sverigetopplistan)	2022	77
Swedish Albums (Sverigetopplistan)	2023	26
Swedish Albums (Sverigetopplistan)	2024	32
Swedish Albums (Sverigetopplistan)	2025	40

== Release history ==
Region	Date	Format	Label
Sweden	26 March 2008	Digital Download	Universal Music AB
