= Måndagsbarn =

Single by Veronica Maggio

from the album Och vinnaren är...
- Released: 11 February 2008
- Recorded: 2007–08
- Genre: Pop
- Length: 3:28
- Label: Universal Music
- Songwriter(s): Oskar Linnros, Veronica Maggio

Veronica Maggio singles chronology
"Havanna mamma" (2006)	"Måndagsbarn" (2008)	"Stopp" (2008)

"Måndagsbarn" (Swedish for "Monday Child") is a single by Swedish singer Veronica Maggio, from her second studio album Och vinnaren är... It was released in Sweden as a digital download on 11 February 2008. The song peaked at number 23 on the Swedish Singles Chart, number eight on the Danish Singles Chart and number one on the Norwegian Singles Chart.

== Music video ==
A music video to accompany the release of "Måndagsbarn" was first released onto YouTube on 3 March 2008 at a total length of three minutes and twenty-seven seconds.

== Track listing ==
Digital download

1. "Måndagsbarn" - 3:28
2. "Måndagsbarn" (Instrumental version) - 3:28
3. "Måndagsbarn" (A cappella version) - 2:59

== Charts ==
Chart (2008/09)	Peak position
Denmark (Tracklisten)	8
Norway (VG-lista)	1
Sweden (Sverigetopplistan)	23

== Release history ==
Region	Date	Format	Label
Sweden	11 February 2008	Digital Download	Universal Music
