= 17 år =

Song by Veronica Maggio

from the album Och vinnaren är...
- Released: 26 March 2008
- Recorded: 2008
- Genre: Soul pop
- Length: 3:40
- Label: Universal
- Songwriters: Veronica Maggio; Oskar Linnros
- Producer: Oskar Linnros

"17 år" is a song recorded by Swedish singer and songwriter Veronica Maggio for her second studio album, Och vinnaren är... (2008).

== Music video ==
A music video to accompany the release of "17 år" was first released onto YouTube on 4 October 2008 at a total length of three minutes and fifty-six seconds.

== Charts ==
=== Weekly charts ===
Weekly chart performance for "17 år"
Chart (2009)	Peak position
Sweden (Sverigetopplistan)	19

Weekly chart performance for "17 år"
Chart (2022–2025)	Peak position
Sweden (Sverigetopplistan)	11

=== Year-end charts ===
Year-end chart performance for "17 år"
Chart	Year	Position
Sweden (Sverigetopplistan)	2009	99
Sweden (Sverigetopplistan)	2023	43
Sweden (Sverigetopplistan)	2024	71
Sweden (Sverigetopplistan)	2025	51

== Release history ==
Region	Date	Format	Label
Sweden	2009	Digital Download	Universal Music
