= Christian Walz =

Swedish artist, songwriter, and producer (born 1978)

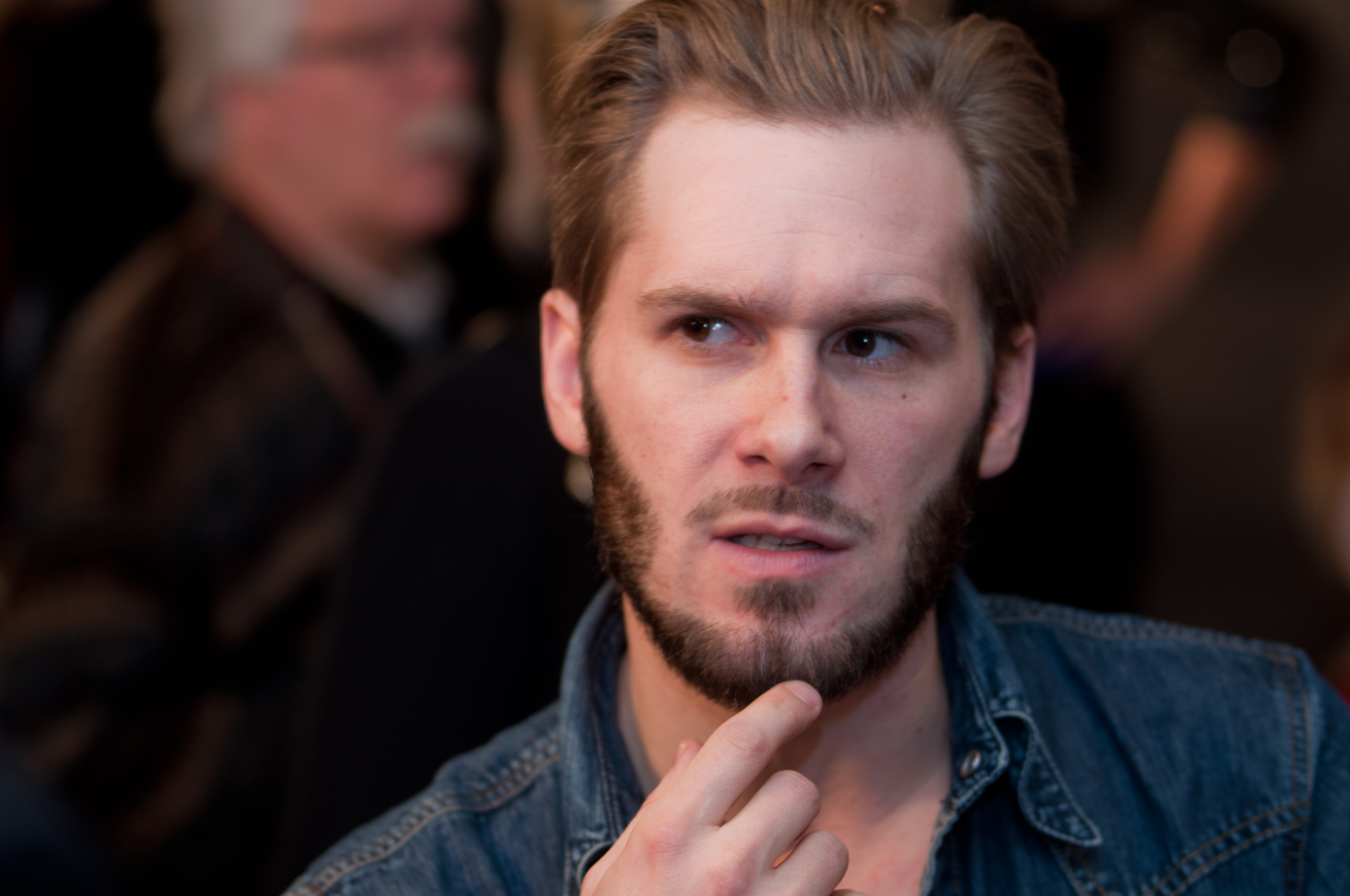
- Christian Walz (2010)
- Born: 4 September 1978 (age 47); Stockholm, Sweden
- Occupation(s): Artist, songwriter, producer
- Website: Official website Myspace page

Christian Walz (born 4 September 1978) is a Swedish artist, songwriter, and producer. Walz's music is mainly pop/soul. When young Walz attended Adolf Fredrik's Music School in Stockholm. He released his self-titled debut album in 1999, aged 20.

It took five years for the next album to be released. "Paint By Numbers" was released in May 2004, became a Swedish Grammy winner and a big hit. The first single from the album was "Maybe Not", which was then followed "Wonderchild", probably the song he is best known for. A further two singles, "Never Be Afraid Again" and "Hit 'n Run" were released. His third album, "The Corner", was released on 26 November 2008 in Sweden.

== Discography ==
- Christian Walz (1999)
  1. Nothing's Gonna Change My Mood
  2. Lovin' Is All Right
  3. EP
  4. Spend The Night Together
  5. Midday, Friday, Payday...
  6. Sentimental
  7. Fertilize
  8. Dancin' To
  9. More Than Flowers
  10. 1 2 3
  11. One Time
  12. Panoum
  13. Records & Amore / Sacrifice
- Paint By Numbers (2004)
  1. Hit 'n Run
  2. No No
  3. You Look All The Same
  4. Never Be Afraid Again
  5. Sunday Morning Breakup
  6. Maybe Not
  7. Wonderchild
  8. Die
  9. I Will Let You Down
  10. Red Eye
  11. Missing You
- The Corner (2008)
  1. Corner
  2. A Beat Like Me
  3. Whats Your Name?
  4. Fade Away
  5. Why You Wanna Save Me
  6. Atlantis
  7. Hello
  8. What A Waste
  9. Money
  10. Loveshift
  11. Producer
  12. Hold My Hand

=== Singles ===
Year	Single	Chart positions	Album
Year	Single	SWE	Album
1998	"One Time"	-	Christian Walz
1999	"Lovin' Is Alright"	-	Christian Walz
1999	"Sentimental"	-	Christian Walz
2004	"Maybe Not"	55	Paint By Numbers
2004	"Wonderchild"	8	Paint By Numbers
2005	"Never Be Afraid Again"	27	Paint By Numbers
2005	"Hit N Run"	-	Paint By Numbers
2008	"What's Your Name?"	17	The Corner
2009	"Atlantis"	-	The Corner
2011	"Like Suicide"	30	TBA
