= Veronica Maggio =

Swedish singer and songwriter (born 1981)

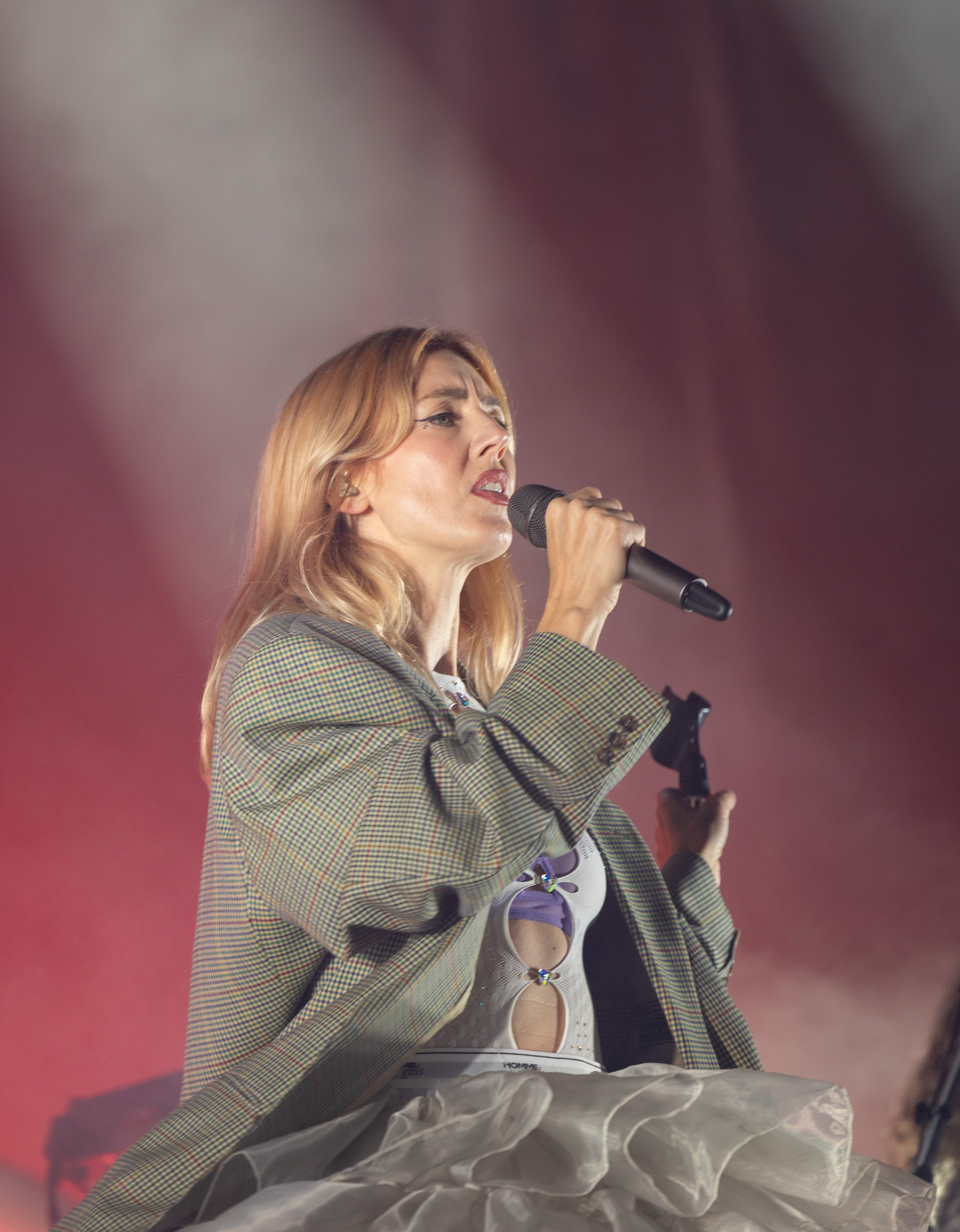
- Maggio in 2024

Background information
- Born: Veronica Sandra Karin Maggio; 15 March 1981 (age 45); Uppsala, Sweden
- Genres: Soul; pop
- Occupation: Singer-songwriter
- Instrument: Vocals
- Years active: 2006–present
- Labels: Stockholm; Universal
- Website: veronicamaggio.se

Veronica Sandra Karin Maggio (born 15 March 1981) is a Swedish singer and songwriter.

Born to an Italian father and a Swedish mother, Maggio was raised in Uppsala. After studying music and being the lead member of a band, Maggio released her debut single, "Dumpa mig" in 2006 under Universal Music. Her debut album, Vatten och bröd (2006), proved to be commercial success and resulted in Maggio winning a Grammis for "Årets nykomling" (Newcomer of the Year).

Since her debut, Maggio has released five more albums under Universal, with four of them topping the charts in Sweden. Additionally, 26 of her songs have become top-20 hits in Sweden. She has had three number one hits in Europe with "Måndagsbarn" (2008) in Norway and "Jag kommer" (2011) and "Hornstullsstrand" (2019) in Sweden. Outside of her solo releases, she has written songs for other artists, including "Hey Brother" (2013) for Avicii, and working with Maja Francis in 2015.

== Biography ==
Veronica Sandra Karin Maggio was born on 15 March 1981 in Uppsala, Sweden, to a Swedish mother and an Italian father. She attended Uppsala Musikklasser primary school and went on to study music at Bolandgymnasiet (Boland highschool) in Uppsala and was also the lead singer of the group Solitude, with other members Daniel Fredriksson, Marcus "Gonzo" Berglund, Karl Jansson, and Kristoffer Hoflund.

In October 2011, Maggio had a son and in 2019 a daughter with Nils Tull of the band Hoffmaestro & Chraa.

== Music career ==
=== 2006–2007: Vatten och bröd ===
In March 2006, Maggio released her debut single "Dumpa mig" (Dump Me); the video for the single soon became the hit of the week on TV stations like ZTV. Her second single was the song "Nöjd?" (Satisfied?). She signed a contract with Universal Music and went on a tour in Summer 2006 as part of Sommarkrysset, a Swedish live-music program on TV4.

Maggio's debut album is called Vatten och bröd (Water and Bread). The lyrics and music were written by Stefan Gräslund, except for the rap verse in "Vi har, vi har" (We Have, We Have), which was written by rapper Kristoffer Malmsten (known as LKM). "I started writing in English when I was really young, but I just wasn't good enough." she said in 2016, "I was mimicking things I'd heard and I wasn't able to find my own identity."

=== 2008–2012: Och vinnaren är... and Satan i gatan ===
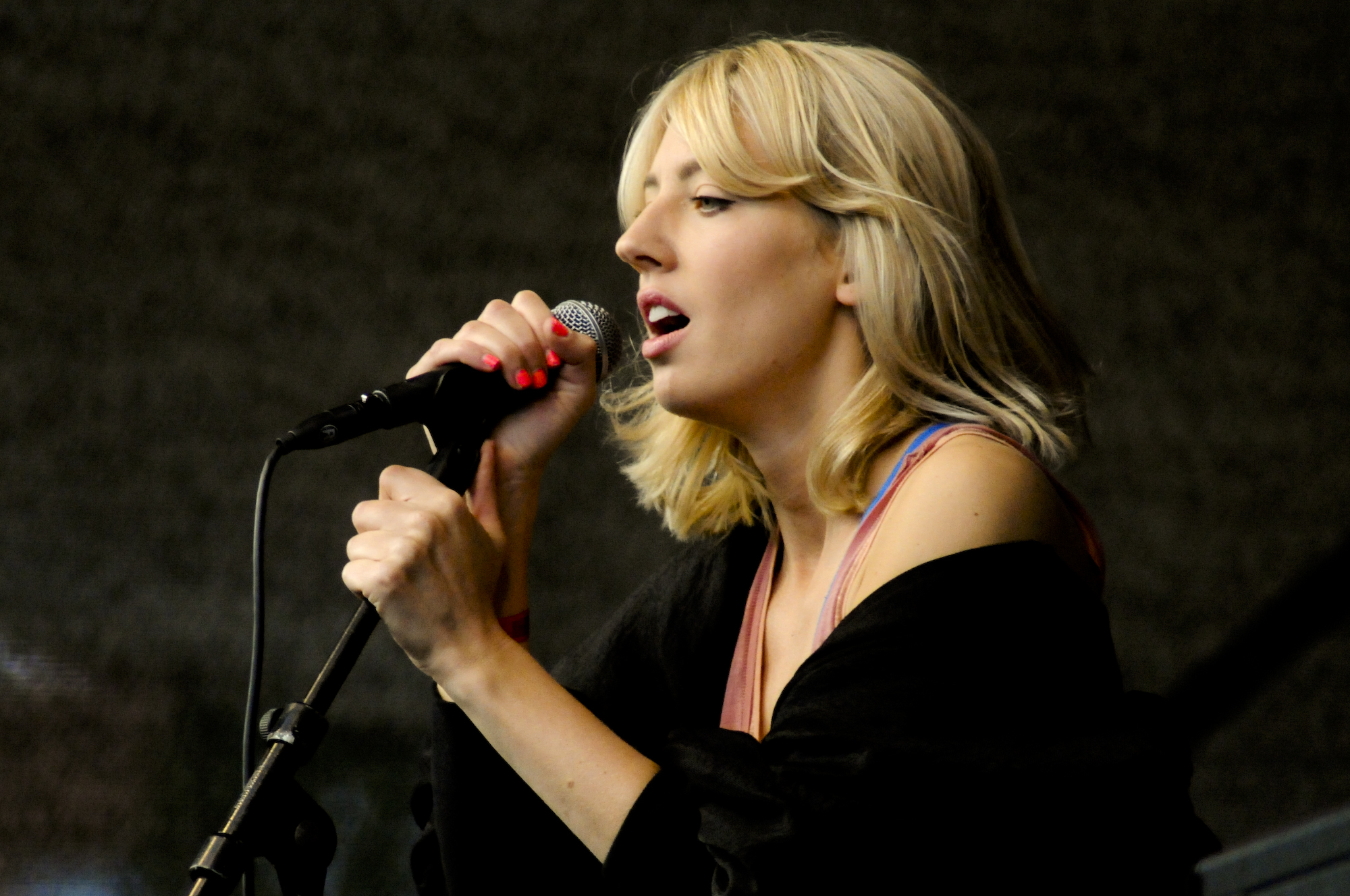
Maggio performing at the Peace & Love festival in 2008

On 26 March 2008, Maggio released her second album, Och vinnaren är... (And the Winner is...), which she wrote and recorded together with Oskar Linnros. In 2009, she enjoyed success in Norway and Denmark with her single "Måndagsbarn" (Monday child) reaching number 1 on the Norwegian charts, as well as being A-listed on the Norwegian radio station NRK P3, and the album Och vinnaren är... broke into the top 40 albums list.

In 2010, Maggio collaborated with Petter on his single "Längesen" (Long Time Ago) from his album "En räddare i nöden" (A saviour when in need). The song gained virality on TikTok in early 2022, reaching a new chart peak of number two.

In 2011, she released the album Satan i gatan, with collaborators including Christian Walz and Markus Krunegård. The album was a success and topped the album chart of both Sweden and Norway. Every track from the album reached the top 30 of the Swedish singles chart. The lead single "Jag kommer" debuted atop the singles chart, and went on to become the most successful single of the year. During the summer and autumn of 2011, Maggio toured through Denmark, Norway and Sweden, and again in 2012 at Ruisrockfestival in Finland.

=== 2013–2017: Handen i fickan fast jag bryr mig and Den första är alltid gratis ===
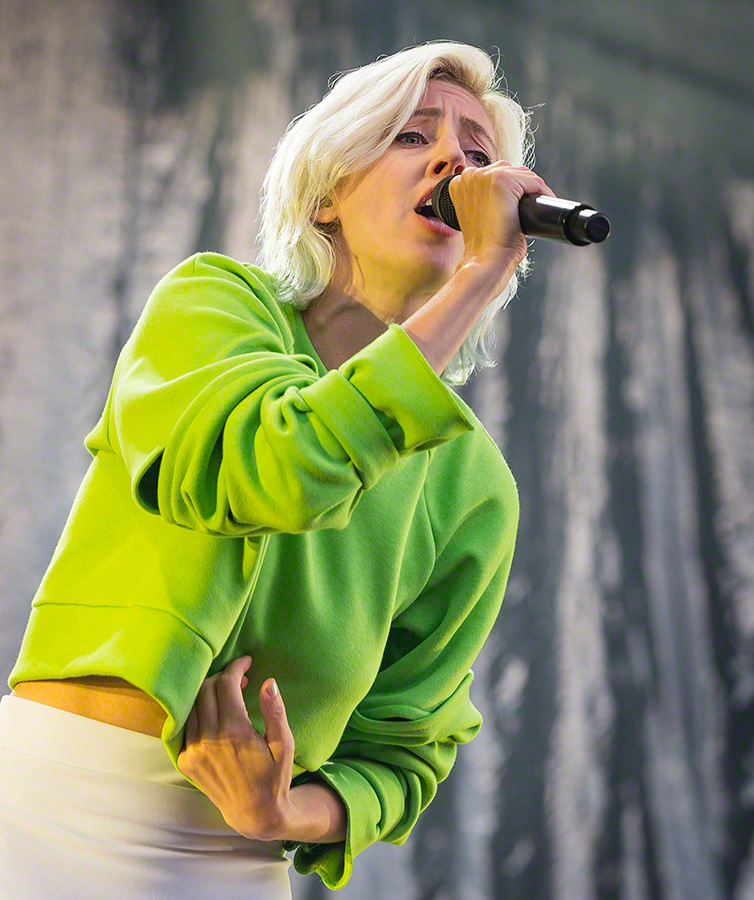
Maggio performing at Stavernfestivalen in 2016

On 4 October 2013, Maggio released her fourth album, Handen i fickan fast jag bryr mig, with production from Salem Al Fakir, Vincent Pontare and Magnus Lidehäll. The album was preceded by the single "Sergels torg", released on 20 August 2013. Critics described the song as Maggio's trademark sound: summery pop with light synth and retro-soul references, combined with relatable lyrics. The album also includes a duet with Swedish singer Håkan Hellström, "Hela huset", which was released as the second single. The album is one of the most successful in Swedish history, having peaked at number one and spending over 531 weeks on the charts as of June 2025, the most of any album.

On 17 March 2016, Maggio released the title track as the first single from her fifth album, Den första är alltid gratis (The First One is Always Free). The album was released on 6 May 2016. A critic described it as "another pop triumph, combining pacing, urgent melodies, with uplifting, hook-heavy choruses." Maggio said in an interview: "I really like the happy/sad combination." "There's a lot of melancholy in it, but there's also something euphoric… I tended to write darker lyrics because it was always nighttime. I was still in the process of playing live lots, so I sort of surprised myself."

In 2016, Maggio was announced as the most streamed artist on Spotify in Sweden since the platform's launch in 2008.

=== 2018–2020: Fiender är tråkigt ===
In 2018, Maggio released the single, "20 Questions" which was featured in Bergman's Reliquarium, a short film homage to Ingmar Bergman.

On 22 March 2019, Maggio released "Kurt Cobain" as the first single from her sixth studio album, Fiender är tråkigt (Enemies are Boring). This was followed by "Tillfälligheter" on 3 May 2019. Both singles achieved considerable success in Sweden, peaking at number four and obtaining places on the year end singles chart for 2019: "Kurt Cobain" at number 53 and "Tillfälligheter" at number 12. The album was released in two halves, with the first five tracks available in June 2019 as an EP. Maggio described the release strategy as a way to "let the songs stand on their own two feet, releasing them over time to give them more space" before making the album available as a whole. In June 2019, Maggio launched her summer tour with three consecutive nights at Stockholm's Gröna Lund, breaking audience records with a total of 51,000 people in attendance.

Following the release of two further singles, "5 minuter" and "Fiender är tråkigt", the full album was released on 27 September 2019. The album peaked at number one on the Swedish charts. Describing the process of making Fiender är tråkigt, Maggio said: "I was a bit depressed for a period about everything, really. I went to LA and wrote, threw away all the music I wrote and for the first time felt completely uninspired. The light in the tunnel appeared when I wrote the first song for the album with Agrin Rahmani. Together with him, Simon Hassle and Jocke Berg, everything suddenly went easily."

=== 2021–2024: Och som vanligt händer det något hemskt ===
In spring 2021, four cover versions of tracks from Maggio's album Satan i gatan were released to celebrate the album's tenth anniversary. These were recorded by Daniela Rathana, Myra Granberg, Victor Leksell and Miriam Bryant.

On 28 May 2021, "Se mig" was released as the first single from Maggio's seventh album Och som vanligt händer det något hemskt. Maggio described the song as having a mood of "longing to explode and feel great emotions again", with a new perspective as a result of the COVID-19 pandemic. On 18 June 2021, Maggio released the song "Nu stannar vi på marken" in coordination with the SJ campaign of the same name aiming to encourage environmentally-friendly travel. The song was written by Stina Nordenstam and is an altered version of "Nu lyfter vi från marken".

Through autumn 2021, Maggio released the singles "Varsomhelst/Närsomhelst" and "På en buss" in promotion of the upcoming album, Och som vanligt händer det något hemskt. The release of the full album was preceded by an EP containing half of the album's songs on 28 October 2021. In spring 2022, further singles "Höghusdrömmar/070-xxxx xxx" and "Heaven med dig" were released ahead of the album's release on 20 May 2022. Lyrically, critics described the album as similar to her previous work with the same themes of "messy youth and bad decisions". While these themes had drawn criticism on Fiender är tråkigt as unrepresentative of Maggio's age, Och som vanligt händer det något hemskt was praised for showing deeper self-awareness and genuineness. The album peaked at number 3 on the Swedish albums chart, becoming her first to miss the top spot since Och vinnaren är... in 2008. It also placed as the 50th highest selling album of 2022 in Sweden. In 2023, it placed as the 61st highest selling of the year.

On 10 February 2023, Maggio released the single "Under någon ny" with Miriam Bryant. The song was written by Maggio, Bryant and Elias Kapari in sessions for Bryant's album, before the decision was made to release the song as a duet. Maggio described the song as about "being someone's worst and wanting them to find someone new". Aftonbladet highlighted the thematic difference from Maggio's previous work, with the focus shifted from her own feelings to apologising to the person left behind. Despite both artists' emotive vocal performances drawing praise, the song was criticised for its repetitive nature. "Under någon ny" won the first edition of the Song Quote of the Year award at P3 Guld 2024 for the line "Om jag var du ikväll, Så skulle jag va´ över mig, ute nu och under någon ny" ("If I were you tonight, I'd be over me, out now and under someone new"). On 2 June 2023, Maggio released "Occhi d'amore" in collaboration with Swedish producer duo NOTD. On 20 October 2023, Maggio released a cover of Håkan Hellström's single "Det kommer aldrig va över för mig" as part of ten-year anniversary celebrations of the album of the same. Her version of the song debuted atop the Swedish singles chart, remaining there for two consecutive weeks and bettering the number two peak of Hellström's original.

=== 2025: Sciura ===
On 25 April 2025, Maggio released "Inte bra i grupp" as the first single from her eighth studio album Sciura, the first part of which is set for release on 3 October 2025. Maggio will perform six shows in Oslo over two days, 14 and 15 October, to mark the release. Recorded in Italy with production from August Vinberg, Sciura was also preceded by the singles "Level Up" and "Backspegeln". Describing the album's creation, Maggio said that she had felt the need to escape a Swedish music scene she described as tired and cannibalistic, finding fresh inspiration in Italy.

Veronica Maggio will also make her acting debut appearing alongside Joel Spira in the film 7 steg, set for release in Sweden on 17 October 2025. Maggio also co-wrote the film with its director, Andreas Öhman. Set in Paris, the titular 7 steps refer to those that Maggio's character, Elle, claims that all romantic relationships are founded upon.

== Awards and recognition ==
Maggio has won many Swedish music awards. In 2007 she received "Årets Nykomling" (Newcomer of the year) at the Grammisgalan.

In 2011 Maggio won the Rockbjörnen (rock bear) prize for both "Årets kvinnliga liveartist" (Live female artist of the year) and "Årets svenska låt" (Swedish song of the year) which was presented by Swedish newspaper Aftonbladet.

At the 2012 Grammisgalan Maggio was named winner in the categories "Årets pop" (Pop of the year), "Årets kompositör" (composer of the year) and "Årets textförfattare" (Lyricist of the year). The latter two were won together with Christian Walz.

French artist Vianney wrote a song about Maggio titled "Veronica".

In 2020, Swedish singer Tove Lo released an English cover of Maggio's song "Jag kommer". In an Instagram post, Lo stated "This [song] is a special one for me because it's my English cover of one of my all time favorite Swedish songs, Jag Kommer, by badass queen [Maggio]. It's the soundtrack to so many of my memories. I've always been so impressed with Veronica's way with words. I could never write in swedish the way she can. It's the perfect mix of poetic, "everyday romance" and making the Swedish summer time feel epic and melancholic all at once."

The latest Grammy's award for Veronica Maggio was in 2023 for "Pop of the Year" for her album "And as always something terrible happened", her 7th studio album.

== Discography ==
Studio albums

- Vatten och bröd (2006)
- Och vinnaren är... (2008)
- Satan i gatan (2011)
- Handen i fickan fast jag bryr mig (2013)
- Den första är alltid gratis (2016)
- Fiender är tråkigt (2019)
- Och som vanligt händer det något hemskt (2022)
- Sciura (2025)
