= Avicii discography =

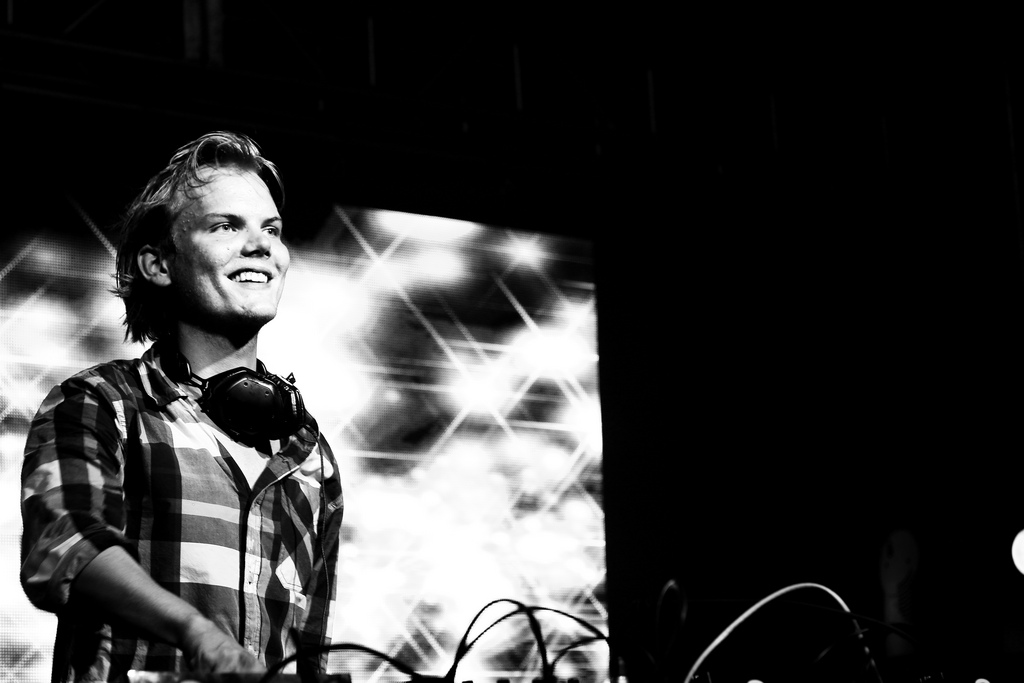
- Avicii performs in London in 2011
- Studio albums: 3
- Extended plays: 6
- Compilation albums: 6
- Singles: 56
- Music videos: 29
- Remix albums: 1
- Mix albums: 1
- Promotional singles: 1

Swedish DJ and record producer Avicii released three studio albums, six compilation albums, one remix album, one mix album, 56 singles, one promotional single and 29 music videos.

== Albums ==
=== Studio albums ===
List of studio albums, with selected chart positions, sales figures and certifications
Title	Album details	Peak chart positions										Sales	Certifications
Title	Album details	SWE	AUS	AUT	BEL (FL)	FRA	GER	NLD	SWI	UK	US	Sales	Certifications
True	Released: 13 September 2013 (SWE); Labels: PRMD, Universal; Formats: CD, LP, digital download	1	1	3	5	8	5	2	2	2	5	US: 319,000	GLF: 3× Platinum; ARIA: 2× Platinum; PMB: Platinum; BPI: Platinum; BVMI: Platinum; IFPI AUT: 3× Platinum; IFPI SWI: Gold; RIAA: Platinum; SNEP: Platinum
Stories	Released: 2 October 2015 (SWE); Labels: PRMD, Universal; Formats: CD, LP, digital download	1	10	6	7	19	8	7	3	9	17		GLF: 2× Platinum; BPI: Gold; IFPI AUT: Gold
Tim	Released: 6 June 2019 (SWE); Label: Universal; Formats: CD, LP, digital download	1	6	3	1	11	5	1	2	7	11		BPI: Silver; SNEP: Gold

=== Compilation albums ===
List of compilation albums
Title	Album details	Peak chart positions						Certifications
Title	Album details	SWE	AUS	BEL (FL)	NLD	UK	US	Certifications
Avicii Presents Strictly Miami (DJ Edition) [Unmixed]	Released: 4 April 2011 (US); Label: Strictly Rhythm; Formats: CD, digital download	—	—	—	—	—	—	
The Singles	Released: 31 May 2011 (US); Label: Ultra; Formats: CD, digital download	—	—	—	—	—	—	
The Collection – taken from Superstar (Deluxe Edition)	Released: 5 August 2011 (US); Label: Superstar Recordings; Formats: CD, digital download	—	—	—	—	—	—	
Live a Life You Will Remember	Released: 7 May 2021; Label: Universal Music Sweden; Formats: streaming	—	—	—	—	—	—	
Avicii Forever	Released: 16 May 2025; Label: Universal Music Sweden; Formats: CD, LP, digital download	2	28	19	12	20	142	BPI: Gold

=== Remix albums ===
List of remix albums, with selected chart positions
Title	Album details	Peak chart positions				
Title	Album details	SWE	AUS	BEL (FL)	SWI	US
True: Avicii by Avicii	Released: 21 March 2014 (SWE); Labels: PRMD, Universal; Formats: CD, digital download	15	16	29	15	139

=== Mix albums ===
List of mix albums
Title	Album details
Avicii Presents Strictly Miami	Released: 5 April 2011 (SWE); Label: Strictly Rhythm; Formats: CD, digital download

== Extended plays ==
List of extended plays, with selected chart positions
Title	Details	Peak chart positions						
Title	Details	SWE	AUS	AUT	FRA	GER	SWI	US
Muja	Released: 15 April 2009; Label: Vicious Grooves; Formats: Digital download	—	—	—	—	—	—	—
I Always DJ Naked (with Starkillers as Killers & Rockers)	Released: 19 October 2010; Label: Ultra Records; Formats: Digital download	—	—	—	—	—	—	—
iTunes Festival: London 2013	Recorded: 15 September 2013; Label: Universal; Formats: Digital download	—	—	—	—	—	—	—
The Days / The Nights	Released: 1 December 2014; Label: PRMD, Universal; Formats: 12", digital download	—	—	—	—	—	—	—
Pure Grinding / For a Better Day	Released: 28 August 2015; Label: PRMD; Formats: Digital download	—	—	—	—	—	—	—
Avīci (01)	Released: 10 August 2017; Label: Universal Music Sweden; Formats: CD, digital download	1	14	9	57	37	11	52
"—" denotes a recording that did not chart or was not released in that territory.

== Singles ==
=== As lead artist ===
List of singles as lead artist, with selected chart positions and certifications, showing year released and album name
Title	Year	Peak chart positions										Certifications	Album
Title	Year	SWE	AUS	AUT	BEL (FL)	FRA	GER	NLD	SWI	UK	US	Certifications	Album
"Lazy Lace"	2007	—	—	—	—	—	—	—	—	—	—		Non-album singles
"Sound of Now"	2008	—	—	—	—	—	—	—	—	—	—		Non-album singles
"Muja"	2009	—	—	—	—	—	—	—	—	—	—		Muja EP
"Ryu"	2009	—	—	—	—	—	—	—	—	—	—		Ryu / Strutnut
"Even" (with Sebastien Drums)	2009	—	—	—	—	—	—	—	—	—	—		Non-album singles
"Alcoholic" (as Tim Berg)	2009	—	—	—	—	—	—	—	—	—	—		Non-album singles
"Break da Floor" (with Ralph)	2009	—	—	—	—	—	—	—	—	—	—		Non-album singles
"Bom"	2010	—	—	—	—	—	—	—	—	—	—		Non-album singles
"Insomnia" (as Tom Hangs with Starkillers, Pimp Rockers and Marco Machiavelli)	2010	—	—	—	—	—	—	—	—	—	—		Non-album singles
"Bromance" (as Tim Berg)	2010	16	—	—	1	—	—	2	—	—	—	BEA: Gold; NVPI: Gold	Non-album singles
"My Feelings for You" (with Sebastien Drums)	2010	37	—	34	—	—	25	24	40	46	—	BVMI: Gold	Non-album singles
"Seek Bromance" (Avicii's Vocal Extended) (as Tim Berg)	2010	20	32	53	—	12	61	—	13	13	—	GLF: Platinum; ARIA: Gold; BEA: Gold; BPI: Gold	Non-album singles
"Tweet It" (as Tim Berg with Norman Doray and Sebastien Drums)	2010	—	—	—	—	—	—	55	—	—	—		Non-album singles
"Malo"	2010	—	—	—	—	—	—	—	—	—	—		Non-album singles
"Don't Hold Back" (with John Dahlbäck as Jovicii featuring Andy P)	2010	—	—	—	—	—	—	—	—	—	—		Non-album singles
"Street Dancer"	2011	—	—	—	—	—	—	33	—	—	—		Non-album singles
"So Excited"	2011	—	—	—	—	—	—	—	—	—	—		Non-album singles
"iTrack" (with Oliver Ingrosso and Otto Knows)	2011	—	—	—	—	—	—	30	—	—	—		Non-album singles
"Sweet Dreams" (Avicii Swede Dreams Mix)	2011	—	—	—	—	—	—	—	—	—	—		Non-album singles
"Blessed" (Avicii Edit) (as Tom Hangs featuring Shermanology)	2011	— (Note: The Avicii radio edit of "Blessed" did not enter the Sverigetopplistan, but peaked at number 19 on the Swedish Heatseeker chart.)	—	—	— (Note: "Blessed" did not enter the Flanders Ultratop 50, but peaked at number 56 on the Ultratip chart.)	69	50	9	—	164	—		Non-album singles
"Jailbait"	2011	—	—	—	—	—	—	—	—	—	—		Non-album singles
"Snus" (with Sebastien Drums)	2011	—	—	—	—	—	—	—	—	—	—		Non-album singles
"Fade into Darkness"	2011	4	70	—	—	—	—	—	—	196	—	GLF: 5× Platinum	Avicii Forever
"Collide" (with Leona Lewis)	2011	— (Note: "Collide" did not enter the Swedish Singellista Chart, but peaked at number 17 on the Swedish Heatseeker Chart.)	—	29	— (Note: "Collide" did not enter the Flanders Ultratop 50, but peaked at number 13 on the Ultratip chart.)	—	—	—	—	4	—	BPI: Silver	Non-album single
"Levels"	2011	1	24	4	4	14	6	4	5	4	60	GLF: 8× Platinum; ARIA: 7× Platinum; BEA: Platinum; BPI: 3× Platinum; BVMI: 3× Platinum; IFPI AUT: Platinum; IFPI SWI: 2× Platinum; NVPI: 4× Platinum; RIAA: 3× Platinum	Avicii Forever
"Before This Night Is Through (Bad Things)" (as Tim Berg)	2012	—	—	—	—	—	—	—	—	—	—		Bad Things – The Ten Year Anniversary Album from Joia Records
"Silhouettes"	2012	11	53	26	— (Note: "Silhouettes" did not enter the Flanders Ultratop 50, but peaked at number four on the Ultratip chart.)	—	87	35	—	22	—	GLF: 3× Platinum; ARIA: Platinum; BPI: Gold	Avicii Forever
"Superlove" (Remix) (vs. Lenny Kravitz)	2012	—	—	—	7	—	—	15	—	49	—		Non-album singles
"Two Million"	2012	—	—	—	—	—	—	—	—	—	—		Non-album singles
"Last Dance"	2012	—	—	—	— (Note: "Last Dance" did not enter the Flanders Ultratop 50, but peaked at number nine on the Ultratip chart.)	40	—	—	—	—	—		Non-album singles
"Dancing in My Head" (with Eric Turner)	2012	—	—	—	—	—	—	54	—	188	—		Non-album singles
"I Could Be the One" (vs. Nicky Romero)	2012	3	4	15	8	22	37	7	26	1	— (Note: "I Could Be the One" did not enter the Billboard Hot 100, but peaked at number one on the Bubbling Under Hot 100 Singles chart.)	ARIA: 4× Platinum; BEA: Gold; BPI: 2× Platinum; BVMI: Gold; NVPI: 3× Platinum; RIAA: Platinum	Avicii Forever
"Three Million (Your Love Is Amazing)" (feat. Negin)	2013	—	—	—	—	—	—	—	—	—	—		Non-album singles
"X You"	2013	19	—	—	— (Note: "X You" did not enter the Flanders Ultratop 50, but peaked at number 34 on the Ultratip chart.)	—	—	48	—	47	—	GLF: Platinum	Non-album singles
"UMF (Ultra Music Festival Anthem)"	2013	—	—	—	—	—	—	—	—	—	—		Ultra Music Festival Anthems EP
"We Write the Story" (with B&B and Choir)	2013	—	—	—	—	—	—	73	—	—	—		Eurovision Song Contest: Malmö 2013
"Wake Me Up"	2013	1	1	1	1	1	1	1	1	1	4	GLF: 13× Platinum; ARIA: 15× Platinum; BEA: 4× Platinum; BPI: 7× Platinum; BVMI: 11× Gold; IFPI SWI: 3× Platinum; IFPI AUT: 2× Platinum; NVPI: 8× Platinum; RIAA: 11× Platinum	True
"Speed" (Burn and Lotus F1 Team Mix)	2013	—	—	50	—	—	—	—	—	—	—		Non-album single
"You Make Me"	2013	1	12	7	20	58	34	20	29	5	85	GLF: 4× Platinum; ARIA: 2× Platinum; BPI: Platinum; BVMI: Gold; NVPI: 2× Platinum; RIAA: Gold	True
"Hey Brother"	2013	1	2	1	3	4	1	1	1	2	16	GLF: 7× Platinum; ARIA: 8× Platinum; BEA: Platinum; BPI: 3× Platinum; BVMI: 2× Platinum; IFPI AUT: Platinum; IFPI SWI: Platinum; NVPI: 3× Platinum; RIAA: 4× Platinum	True
"Addicted to You"	2013	11	5	3	5	6	6	6	4	14	—	GLF: 3× Platinum; ARIA: 4× Platinum; BEA: Gold; BPI: Platinum; BVMI: 3× Gold; IFPI AUT: Gold	True
"Lay Me Down"	2014	39	—	17	— (Note: "Lay Me Down" did not enter the Flanders Ultratop 50, but peaked at number four on the Ultratip chart.)	47	35	44	41	200	—	GLF: Gold	True
"The Days"	2014	1	10	3	— (Note: "The Days" did not enter the Flanders Ultratop 50, but peaked at number two on the Ultratip chart.)	52	7	10	8	82	78	GLF: Platinum; ARIA: 2× Platinum; BPI: Silver; BVMI: Gold	The Days / Nights EP
"The Nights"	2014	2	9	6	14	79	19	19	17	6	— (Note: "The Nights" did not enter the Billboard Hot 100, but peaked at number nine on the Bubbling Under Hot 100 Singles chart.)	GLF: Platinum; ARIA: 5× Platinum; BPI: 3× Platinum; BVMI: Platinum; IFPI AUT: Gold; RIAA: Platinum	The Days / Nights EP
"Feeling Good"	2015	27	—	—	—	—	—	—	—	—	—		Non-album single
"Waiting for Love"	2015	1	15	1	15	14	8	6	7	6	— (Note: "Waiting for Love" did not enter the Billboard Hot 100, but peaked at number 10 on the Bubbling Under Hot 100 Singles chart.)	GLF: 7× Platinum; ARIA: 4× Platinum; BEA: Platinum; BPI: 2× Platinum; BVMI: Platinum; IFPI AUT: Gold; RIAA: Gold	Stories
"For a Better Day"	2015	5	51	10	—	26	18	17	16	68	—	GLF: 2× Platinum; BPI: Silver; BVMI: Gold	Stories
"Pure Grinding"	2015	19	—	71	—	—	94	—	—	—	—	GLF: Platinum	Stories
"Broken Arrows"	2015	4	30	70	—	—	82	43	57	178	— (Note: "Broken Arrows" did not enter the Billboard Hot 100, but peaked at number 17 on the Bubbling Under Hot 100 Singles chart.)	GLF: 3× Platinum; BPI: Silver	Stories
"Taste the Feeling" (vs. Conrad Sewell)	2016	60	—	17	—	148	53	—	—	—	—		Non-album single
"Without You" (featuring Sandro Cavazza)	2017	1	20	7	15	30	18	13	10	32	— (Note: "Without You" did not enter the Billboard Hot 100, but peaked at number 14 on the Bubbling Under Hot 100 Singles chart.)	GLF: 7× Platinum; BEA: Platinum; BPI: Platinum; BVMI: Platinum; IFPI AUT: Gold; RIAA: Gold; SNEP: Diamond	Avīci (01)
"Lonely Together" (featuring Rita Ora)	2017	3	32	18	36	66	24	22	22	4	— (Note: "Lonely Together" did not enter the Billboard Hot 100, but peaked at number 18 on the Bubbling Under Hot 100 Singles chart.)	BEA: Gold; BPI: 2× Platinum; BVMI: Platinum; RIAA: Platinum; SNEP: Platinum	Avīci (01)
"SOS" (featuring Aloe Blacc)	2019	1	7	4	2	49	8	2	3	6	68	ARIA: 3× Platinum; BEA: Platinum; BPI: 2× Platinum; BVMI: Platinum; RIAA: Gold; SNEP: Gold	Tim
"Tough Love" (featuring Vargas & Lagola and Agnes)	2019	2	—	45	— (Note: "Tough Love" did not enter the Flanders Ultratop 50, but peaked at number 18 on the Ultratip chart.)	—	72	60	31	60	—		Tim
"Heaven" (featuring Chris Martin)	2019	2	20	21	15	119	30	16	11	20	83	BPI: Gold; RIAA: Gold; SNEP: Gold	Tim
"Fades Away" (Tribute Concert Version) (featuring MishCatt)	2019	77	—	—	— (Note: "Fades Away" did not enter the Flanders Ultratop 50, but peaked at number two on the Ultratip chart.)	—	—	—	—	—	—	GLF: Gold	Tim
"Forever Yours (Tribute)" (with Kygo and Sandro Cavazza)	2020	4	96	—	— (Note: "Forever Yours (Tribute)" did not enter the Flanders Ultratop 50, but peaked at number eight on the Ultratip chart.)	—	65	64	25	—	—		Non-album single
"Forever Yours (Tim's 2016 Ibiza Version)" (with Sandro Cavazza)	2025	—	—	—	—	—	—	—	—	—	—		Avicii Forever
"Let's Ride Away" (with Elle King)	2025	17	—	—	—	—	—	—	—	—	—		Avicii Forever
"—" denotes a recording that did not chart or was not released in that territory.

=== As featured artist ===
List of singles as featured artist, with selected chart positions, showing year released and album name
Title	Year	Peak chart positions								Album
Title	Year	SWE	BEL (FL) Tip	FRA	NOR	SPA	UK	US Bub.	US Dance	Album
"Divine Sorrow" (Wyclef featuring Avicii)	2014	7	23	105	25	38	174	9	12	J'ouvert (EP)
"Dar um Jeito (We Will Find a Way)" (Santana and Wyclef featuring Avicii and Alexandre Pires)	2014	—	16	—	—	49	—	—	—	One Love, One Rhythm
"忘我 (Lose Myself)" (Wang Leehom featuring Avicii)	2014	—	—	—	—	—	—	—	—	你的愛 (Your Love)
"Back Where I Belong" (Otto Knows featuring Avicii)	2016	32	―	―	—	―	—	―	—	Non-album single
"—" denotes a recording that did not chart or was not released in that territory.

=== Promotional singles ===
List of promotional singles, with selected chart positions, showing year released and album name
Title	Year	Peak chart positions			Album
Title	Year	BEL (FL) Tip	BEL (WA) Tip	NLD	Album
"Penguin/Fade into Darkness (Instrumental Mix)"	2011	16	33	60	Non-album single

== Other charted songs ==
List of songs, with selected chart positions and certifications, showing year released and album name
Title	Year	Peak chart positions					Certifications	Album
Title	Year	SWE	BEL (FL) Tip	NLD	NOR	US Dance	Certifications	Album
"Sunshine" (with David Guetta)	2011	59	—	—	—	—		Nothing but the Beat
"Run Away" (Kate Ryan featuring Tim Berg)	2012	—	37	—	—	—		Electroshock
"Dear Boy"	2013	18	—	—	—	34		True
"Liar Liar"	2013	26	—	—	—	45		True
"Shame on Me"	2013	32	—	—	—	—		True
"Hope There's Someone"	2013	47	—	—	—	—		True
"Heart Upon My Sleeve"	2013	51	—	—	—	49		True
"All You Need Is Love"	2013	33	—	—	—	—		True
"Gonna Love Ya"	2015	3	—	—	25	32	GLF: 3× Platinum	Stories
"Somewhere in Stockholm"	2015	30	—	—	—	—		Stories
"Trouble"	2015	33	—	—	—	46		Stories
"Sunset Jesus"	2015	37	—	—	—	49		Stories
"Talk to Myself"	2015	43	—	—	—	25		Stories
"Ten More Days"	2015	45	—	—	—	—		Stories
"Can't Catch Me"	2015	55	—	—	—	—		Stories
"True Believer"	2015	64	—	—	—	50		Stories
"City Lights"	2015	66	—	—	—	—		Stories
"Touch Me"	2015	69	—	—	—	—		Stories
"Stories – Megamix"	2015	— (Note: "Stories – Megamix" did not enter the Swedish Singles Chart, but peaked at number 17 on the Swedish Heatseeker chart.)	—	—	—	—		Non-album single
"Friend of Mine" (featuring Vargas & Lagola)	2017	5	—	—	—	44		Avīci (01)
"You Be Love" (featuring Billy Raffoul)	2017	9	—	—	—	41		Avīci (01)
"What Would I Change It To" (featuring AlunaGeorge)	2017	11	—	—	—	—		Avīci (01)
"So Much Better" (Avicii Remix) (with Sandro Cavazza)	2017	12	—	—	—	—		Avīci (01)
"Peace of Mind" (featuring Vargas & Lagola)	2019	17	—	99	—	22		Tim
"Bad Reputation" (featuring Joe Janiak)	2019	9	—	84	—	23		Tim
"Ain't a Thing" (featuring Bonn)	2019	21	—	—	—	26		Tim
"Hold the Line" (featuring Arizona)	2019	16	—	93	—	18		Tim
"Freak" (featuring Bonn)	2019	12	—	—	—	25		Tim
"Excuse Me Mr. Sir" (featuring Vargas & Lagola)	2019	30	—	—	—	34		Tim
"Heart Upon My Sleeve" (with Imagine Dragons)	2019	11	—	96	—	14		Tim
"Never Leave Me" (featuring Joe Janiak)	2019	28	—	—	—	29		Tim
"Fades Away" (featuring Noonie Bao)	2019	26	—	—	—	28		Tim
"—" denotes a recording that did not chart or was not released in that territory.

== Remixes ==
List of remixes, with other performing artists and remixers, showing year released and album name
Title	Year	Performing artist(s)	Other remixer(s)	Album
"When I'm Thinking of You" (Avicii vs. Philgood Remix)	2008	Francesco Diaz, Young Rebels	Philgood	When I'm Thinking of You
"Solaris" (Avicii Greets Joia Mix)	2008	Roman Salzger	None	Solaris – EP
"Dancin'" (Avicii Remix)	2008	Sebastien Benett	None	Dancin'
"Bang That Box" (Avicii vs. Philgood Remix)	2008	Roger Sanchez, Terri B.	Philgood	Bang That Box
"D10" (Avicii vs. Philgood's Vicious Remix)	2008	Dirty South	Philgood	D10
"Lost in Acid" (Tim Berg's Acidic Remix)	2009	David Tort	None	Acid
"Born to Rave" (Avicii and Philgood Born to Do It Remix)	2009	DJ Ralph	Philgood	Born to Rave – EP
"Life Goes On" (Avicii vs. Philgood Remix)	2009	Richard Grey, Erick Morillo, José Nunez	Philgood	Life Goes On (2009 Remixes) (feat. Shawnee Taylor) – EP
"Whatever Kind" (Avicii Remix)	2009	Mic Newman	None	Whatever Kind
"You Used to Hold Me" (Avicii Remember Remix)	2009	D.O.N.S., Terri B.	None	You Used to Hold Me (feat. Terri B.)
"Somewhere" (Avicii Remix)	2009	Albin Myers, Sandro Monte, Abigail Bailey	None	Somewhere (feat. Abigail Bailey)
"Sometimes I Feel" (Avicii's Out of Miami Mix)	2009	Dim Chris, Sebastien Drums, Paulina	None	Sometimes I Feel (feat. Paulina) – EP
"Star Airlines" (Avicii Remix)	2009	Sebastien Benett	None	Star Airlines – Single
"We Are" (Avicii Remix)	2009	Dirty South	None	We Are (Remixes)
"Lipstick" (Avicii Remix)	2009	Greg Cerrone	None	Lipstick
"Tear the Club Up" (Avicii vs. Philgood Two Angry Mix)	2009	Zoo Brazil	Philgood	Tear the Club Up – Single
"Music Around the World" (Avicii Remix)	2009	Austin Leeds, Nick Terranova, Teacha	None	Music Around the World (feat. Teacha) – EP
"Boogers" (Avicii's Dumb Dumb Remix)	2009	MYNC, Harry Choo Choo Romero, José Nunez	None	Boogers – EP
"Better Days" (Avicii Remix)	2009	The Cut	None	Better Days
"Shy Shy" (Avicii Remix)	2009	EDX	None	Shy Shy (Part Two)
"Got 2 Get Up" (Avicii Remix)	2009	Mr. Timothy, Inaya Day	None	Got 2 Get Up
"Touch Me (In the Morning)" (Avicii's Massive Mix)	2009	Kid Massive, Elliotte Williams N'Dure	None	Touch Me (In the Morning)
"Dreamer 2009" (Avicii Dream On Mix)	2009	Veersus, Maxie Devine, Viani DJ, Janice Robinson	None	Dreamer 2009 (Remixes) – EP
"Escape Me" (Avicii's Remix at Night)	2009	Tiësto, C.C. Sheffield	None	Kaleidoscope: Remixed
"Fade" (Avicii 2009 Remix)	2009	Solu Music, Kimblee	None	None
"The Drums" (Avicii's Mouthful Remix)	2009	Alex Gaudino, Nari & Milani	None	My Destination (The Remixes)
"One Love" (Avicii Remix)	2009	David Guetta, Estelle	None	One Love (Remixes) [feat. Estelle]
"In the Air" (Avicii Remix)	2009	Austin Leeds, Jeremy Carr	None	In the Air (feat. Jeremy Carr)
"Set Me Free" (Avicii Remix)	2010	Phonat	None	Set Me Free
"Spotlight" (Avicii Rising Star Mix)	2010	The Good Guys, Tesz Milan	None	Spotlight – EP
"Do It with Me" (Avicii vs. Philgood Remix)	2010	Austin Leeds, Etienne Osbourne, Steve Bartland	Philgood	Do It With Me (Avicii vs. Philgood Remix) [feat. Steve Bertrand] – Single
"Stop the Rock" (Avicii's Showstopping Remix)	2010	Jason Rooney	None	Stop the Rock – EP
"Can't Fight This Feeling" (Avicii Universe Mix)	2010	Junior Caldera, Sophie Ellis-Bextor	None	Can't Fight This Feeling (Club Remixes) [feat. Sophie Ellis-Bextor] – EP
"Salinas" (Tim Berg Remix)	2010	Dimitri Vegas & Like Mike	None	Salinas
"Remedy" (Avicii Club Mix)	2010	Little Boots	None	Remedy Remixes – EP
"Cookies with a Smile" (Avicii Remix)	2010	Dada Life	None	Cookies With a Smile – EP
"New New New" (Avicii Meets Yellow Mix)	2010	Bob Sinclar, Vybrate, Queen Ifrica, Makedah	None	Strictly Bob Sinclar
"Gettin' Over You" (Avicii's Vocal Mix at Night)	2010	David Guetta, Chris Willis, Fergie, LMFAO	None	Gettin' Over You – EP
"I Feel Love" (Avicii's Forgotten Remix)	2010	Rhythm Masters, MYNC, Wynter Gordon	None	I Feel Love (feat. Wynter Gordon) – EP
"I Like It" (Avicii Remix)	2010	Enrique Iglesias, Pitbull	None	I Like It (feat. Pitbull) [Remixes]
"Getting Personal" (Avicii's Italectronic Remix)	2010	Maurizio Gubellini, Mia Crispin	None	Getting Personal (Remixes) [feat. Mia Crispin]
"Hang with Me" (Avicii's Exclusive Club Mix)	2010	Robyn	None	Hang With Me – EP
"Painted Faces" (Avicii Remix)	2010	Paul Thomas, Sonny Wharton	None	Painted Faces – Single
"Rapture" (Avicii New Generation Remix)	2010	Nadia Ali	None	Queen of Clubs Trilogy: Onyx Edition
"Derezzed" (Avicii Remix) (Note: On these songs, Avicii has also received an artist credit.)	2011	Daft Punk	None	Tron: Legacy Reconfigured
"Drowning" (Avicii Remix)	2011	Armin van Buuren, Laura V	None	Mirage – The Remixes
"Girl Gone Wild" (Avicii's UMF Mix)	2012	Madonna	None	Girl Gone Wild (Remixes)
"Get Free" (Avicii Edit)	2013	Major Lazer, Amber Coffman	None	Lazer Strikes Back Vol. 3
"Miami 82" (Avicii Edit)	2013	Syn Cole	None	None
"Derezzed" (Avicii "So Amazing Mix")	2014	Daft Punk, Negin	None	Dconstructed
"Insomnia 2.0" (Avicii Remix)	2015	Faithless	Faithless	Faithless 2.0
"Beautiful Heartbeat" (Avicii Remix) (featuring Frida Sundemo)	2016	MORTEN	None	Beautiful Heartbeat – Single
"So Much Better" (Avicii Remix)	2017	Sandro Cavazza	None	Sandro Cavazza – EP
"Beautiful Drug" (feat. Avicii) - Remix	2024	Zac Brown Band	None	Jekyll + Hyde

== Writing and production credits ==
Title	Year	Performing artist(s)	Co-producer(s)	Album
"You're Gonna Love Again"	2012	NERVO	Olivia Nervo, Miriam Nervo	Collateral
"Animal" (featuring J-Hope of BTS)	2012	Jo Kwon	Lauren Dyson, Bang Si-hyuk	I'm Da One
"A Sky Full of Stars"	2014	Coldplay	Paul Epworth, Coldplay, Daniel Green, Rik Simpson, Jon Hopkins	Ghost Stories
"Lovers on the Sun" (featuring Sam Martin)	2014	David Guetta	David Guetta, Giorgio Tuinfort, Frédéric Riesterer	Listen
"Yesterday" (featuring Bebe Rexha)	2014	David Guetta	David Guetta, Giorgio Tuinfort, Bebe Rexha, Sean Douglas	Listen
"Devil Pray"	2015	Madonna	Madonna, Blood Diamonds, DJ Dahi	Rebel Heart
"HeartBreakCity"	2015	Madonna	Madonna, Salem Al Fakir, Magnus Lidehäll, Vincent Pontare, Astma & Rocwell	Rebel Heart
"Wash All Over Me"	2015	Madonna	Madonna, Mike Dean, Kanye West, Charlie Heat	Rebel Heart
"Messiah"	2015	Madonna	Madonna, Salem Al Fakir, Magnus Lidehäll, Vincent Pontare	Rebel Heart
"Rebel Heart"	2015	Madonna	Madonna, Salem Al Fakir, Magnus Lidehäll, Vincent Pontare	Rebel Heart
"Borrowed Time"	2015	Madonna	Madonna, Carl Falk, Michael Diamonds, DJ Dahi	Rebel Heart
"Addicted"	2015	Madonna	Madonna, Carl Falk	Rebel Heart
"I’ll Be Waiting"	2015	Walk Off The Earth	Gianni Luminati Nicassio, Thomas Salter	Sing It All Away
"Thinking of Sunshine"	2015	Daniel Adams-Ray	Daniel Adams-Ray, Henrik Jonback	Thinking of Sunshine
"Hymn for the Weekend"	2016	Coldplay	Rik Simpson, Stargate, Digital Divide	A Head Full of Dreams
"Girlfriend"	2018	Anderson East	Anderson East, Dave Cobb	Encore
"GHOST"	2018	HUMAN	Daniel Adams-Ray, Carl Wikstrom Ask, Elias Kapari, Henrik Jonback	IRL
"The Otherside"	2020	Cam	Camaron Ochs, Tyler Johnson, Hillary Lindsey	The Otherside

== Music videos ==
=== As lead artist ===
List of music videos as lead artist, showing year released and directors
Title	Year	Director(s)
"Fade into Darkness"	2011	Tobias Hansson, Karl Aulin
"Collide" (with Leona Lewis)	2011	Ethan Lader
"Levels"	2011	Petro
"Silhouettes"	2012	Niklas Johansson
"Superlove" (Remix) (vs. Lenny Kravitz)	2012	Rich Ragsdale
"I Could Be the One" (vs. Nicky Romero)	2013	Peter Huang
"X You"	2013	None
"Wake Me Up"	2013	Mark Seliger
"Speed Burn & Lotus F1 Mix"	2013	None
"You Make Me"	2013	Sebastian Ringler
"Hey Brother"	2013	Jesse Sternbaum
"Addicted to You"	2014	Sebastian Ringler
"Wake Me Up (Avicii by Avicii)"	2014	Zachary James, Alex Negrete
"Hey Brother (Avicii by Avicii)"	2014	Nick Fung, Nate Olson
"Addicted to You (Avicii by Avicii)"	2014	Keshen8
"You Make Me (Avicii by Avicii)"	2014	Joe Penna
"Lay Me Down"	2014	None
"Lose Myself (忘我)" (with Wang Leehom)	2014	Jeff Richter
"The Days"	2014	Jesper Erikssen
"The Nights"	2014	Jesper Erikssen
"Feeling Good"	2015	None
"Waiting For Love"	2015	Sebastian Ringler
"Pure Grinding/For a Better Day"	2015	Levan Tsikurishvili, Tim Bergling
"Broken Arrows"	2015	Julius Onah
"Feeling Good (Avicii by Avicii)	2016	None
"Lonely Together" (featuring Rita Ora)	2017	Levan Tsikurishvili
"You Be Love" (featuring Billy Raffoul)	2017	TNT
"Friend of Mine" (featuring Vargas & Lagola)	2017	Tobias Leo Nordquist
"Tough Love" (featuring Agnes, Vargas & Lagola)	2019	Fredrik Benke Rydman
"Heaven"	2019	Levan Tsikurishvili

=== As featured artist ===
List of music videos as featured artist, showing year released and directors
Title	Year	Director(s)
"Divine Sorrow" (Wyclef featuring Avicii)	2014	Mr. Brainwash
