= Avicii Forever =

Greatest hits album by Avicii
- Released: 16 May 2025
- Length: 70:06
- Labels: Pinguettes; Universal Sweden

Avicii chronology
Live a Life You Will Remember (2021)	Avicii Forever (2025)

Singles from Avicii Forever
- 1. "Forever Yours (Tim's 2016 Ibiza Version)" Released: 14 February 2025; 2. "Let's Ride Away" Released: 16 May 2025

Avicii Forever is the first greatest hits album by Swedish electronic music producer Avicii, released posthumously on 16 May 2025. It is his second posthumous album since his death in April 2018. The album consists of 19 previously released songs and a new track, "Let's Ride Away" with Elle King. The first run of physical copies also includes a then-unreleased version of "Forever Yours", which Avicii most notably played during his final show on 28 August 2016 at the Ushuaïa Ibiza Beach Hotel.

The cover art features a rendering of a stone monument of Avicii's logo, made from over 500 kg of stone quarried from Skåne, Sweden. The album follows the documentary film Avicii – I'm Tim.

The album is also known for being the most-streamed recent release and electronic album to reach over ten billion streams on Spotify, making it the fifth most-streamed album in the platform's history.

== Track listing ==
Avicii Forever track listing
No.	Title	Writer(s)	Producer(s)	Length
1.	"Wake Me Up"	Tim Bergling; Aloe Blacc; Mike Einziger	Avicii; Arash Pournouri	4:09
2.	"Levels" (radio edit)	Bergling; Pournouri; Leroy Kirkland; Etta James	Avicii	3:21
3.	"Let's Ride Away" (with Elle King)	Bergling; Kacey Musgraves; Elle King; Luke Laird; Carl Falk	Avicii; Falk; Laird	2:53
4.	"The Nights"	Bergling; Nicholas Furlong; Gabriel Benjamin; Jordan Suecof; John Feldmann	Avicii; Pournouri	2:56
5.	"Waiting for Love"	Bergling; Simon Aldred; Salem Al Fakir; Vincent Pontare; Martijn Garritsen	Avicii; Martin Garrix	3:50
6.	"Without You" (featuring Sandro Cavazza)	Bergling; Falk; Pontare; Dhani Lennevald; Fakir; Alessandro Cavazza	Avicii; Falk	3:01
7.	"SOS" (featuring Aloe Blacc)	Bergling; Albin Nedler; Kristoffer "Bonn" Fogelmark; Kandi Burruss; Tameka Cottle; Kevin Briggs	Avicii; Nedler; Fogelmark	2:37
8.	"Hey Brother"	Bergling; Pournouri; Pontare; Fakir; Veronica Maggio	Avicii; Pournouri	4:14
9.	"Lonely Together" (featuring Rita Ora)	Bergling; Benjamin Levin; Ali Tamposi; Brian Lee; Magnus August Høiberg; Andrew Wotman	Avicii; Benny Blanco; Andrew Watt; Cashmere Cat	3:01
10.	"I Could Be the One" (radio edit, with Nicky Romero)	Bergling; Nick Rotteveel; Pournouri; Linus Wiklund; Jonnali Parmenius; Måns Wredenberg	Avicii; Nicky Romero; Pournouri	3:28
11.	"Silhouettes"	Bergling; Pournouri; Fakir	Avicii	3:31
12.	"Fade into Darkness"	Bergling; Pournouri; Simon Jeffes; John Martin; Michel Zitron; Wredenberg	Avicii; Pournouri	3:18
13.	"You Make Me"	Bergling; Pournouri; Pontare; Fakir	Avicii; Pournouri	3:53
14.	"The Days"	Bergling; Brandon Flowers; Fakir; Robbie Williams; Pontare	Avicii; Fakir; Pontare	4:38
15.	"For a Better Day"	Bergling; Alex Ebert	Avicii; Ebert	3:26
16.	"Addicted to You"	Bergling; Pournouri; Mac Davis; Josh Krajcik	Avicii; Pournouri	2:28
17.	"Friend of Mine" (featuring Vargas & Lagola)	Bergling; Pontare; Fakir	Avicii	2:39
18.	"Broken Arrows"	Bergling; Zac Brown; Eric Turner; Rami Yacoub; Niko Moon	Avicii; Falk; Pournouri	3:52
19.	"Heart Upon My Sleeve" (with Imagine Dragons)	Bergling; Pournouri; Dan Reynolds; Wayne Sermon; Ben McKee; Daniel Platzman	Avicii; Pournouri	4:14
20.	"Heaven" (featuring Chris Martin)	Bergling; Chris Martin	Avicii	4:37
Total length:				70:06

Early physical release bonus track
No.	Title	Writer(s)	Producer(s)	Length
21.	"Forever Yours (Tim's 2016 Ibiza Version)" (with Sandro Cavazza)	Bergling; Dominic Miller; Jan Kask; Kyrre Gørvell-Dahll; Marcus Thunberg Wessel; Cavazza; Gordon Sumner	Avicii; Wessel	3:28
Total length:				73:34

Japanese Edition bonus track
No.	Title	Writer(s)	Producer(s)	Length
21.	"Tough Love (Tiësto Remix)" (with Agnes, Vargas & Lagola)	Bergling, Vincent Pontare, Salem Al Fakir, Isak Alverus	Tiësto; Avicii; Vargas & Lagola	3:58
22.	"Fades Away (Tribute Concert Version)" (with MishCatt)	MishCatt; Noonie Bao; Bergling	Carl Falk; Avicii	2:53

== Charts ==
=== Weekly charts ===
Weekly chart performance for Avicii Forever
Chart (2025)	Peak position
Australian Albums (ARIA)	28
Austrian Albums (Ö3 Austria)	10
Belgian Albums (Ultratop Flanders)	19
Belgian Albums (Ultratop Wallonia)	33
Canadian Albums (Billboard)	39
Dutch Albums (Album Top 100)	12
French Albums (SNEP)	34
German Albums (Offizielle Top 100)	18
Hungarian Physical Albums (MAHASZ)	13
Irish Albums (Official Charts)	11
Italian Albums (FIMI)	46
Japanese Albums (Oricon)	21
Japanese Combined Albums (Oricon)	30
Japanese Dance & Soul Albums (Oricon)	1
Japanese Download Albums (Billboard Japan)	13
Japanese Top Albums Sales (Billboard Japan)	23
New Zealand Albums (RMNZ)	15
Norwegian Albums (VG-lista)	24
Polish Albums (ZPAV)	96
Portuguese Albums (AFP)	180
Scottish Albums (Official Charts)	27
Spanish Albums (Promusicae)	71
Swedish Albums (Sverigetopplistan)	2
Swiss Albums (Schweizer Hitparade)	9
UK Albums (Official Charts)	20
UK Dance Albums (Official Charts)	1
US Billboard 200	142
US Top Dance Albums (Billboard)	5

=== Monthly charts ===
Monthly chart performance for Avicii Forever
Chart (2025)	Position
Japanese Albums (Oricon)	43
Japanese Dance & Soul Albums (Oricon)	1

=== Year-end charts ===
Year-end chart performance for Avicii Forever
Chart (2025)	Position
French Albums (SNEP)	141
US Top Dance Albums (Billboard)	21

== Certifications ==
Certifications for Avicii Forever
Region	Certification	Certified units/sales
France (SNEP)	Gold	50,000^{‡}
Italy (FIMI)	Gold	25,000^{‡}
New Zealand (RMNZ)	Gold	7,500^{‡}
United Kingdom (BPI)	Gold	100,000^{‡}
^{‡} Sales+streaming figures based on certification alone.
