= Avicii – I'm Tim =

- Official film poster
- Directed by: Henrik Burman
- Written by: Henrik Burman
- Produced by: Björn Tjärnberg
- Starring: Tim Bergling; Chris Martin; Nile Rodgers; Arash Pournouri; David Guetta; Aloe Blacc
- Cinematography: Björn Tjärnberg
- Edited by: Orvar Anklew; Kalle Lindberg
- Music by: Jan Lekemark
- Production company: Candamo Film
- Release dates: June 9, 2024 (Tribeca); November 6, 2024 (Sweden); December 31, 2024 (Netflix)
- Countries: Sweden; United States
- Language: English

Avicii – I'm Tim is a 2024 documentary film about the life of Swedish DJ Avicii. The film premiered at the Tribeca Festival on June 9, 2024. It is directed by Swedish director Henrik Burman, produced by Björn Tjärnberg, and features interviews from Chris Martin, Nile Rodgers and David Guetta among others.

== Synopsis ==
The former movie description from Tribeca Festival reads: "Before there was Avicii, there was just Tim. For the first time through his own words, witness the journey of a shy but prodigious musical talent who would soon become one of the defining artists of his generation".

According to Billboard, the movie will include "never-before-seen archive footage and interviews with Bergling himself". It will also feature "newly produced material, with interviews with Bergling's family, friends and colleagues".

== Participants ==
Person	Role	Footage used
Tim Bergling	Himself	Archive footage
Chris Martin	Himself	Interview, studio footage
Aloe Blacc	Himself	Interview, studio footage
David Guetta	Himself	Interview, studio footage
Nile Rodgers	Himself	Interview, studio footage
Arash Pournouri	Himself	Interview, studio footage
Dan Tyminski	Himself	Interview, studio footage
Mike Einziger	Himself	Interview, studio footage
Joe Janiak	Himself	Interview, studio footage
Carl Falk	Himself	Interview, studio footage
Audra Mae	Herself	Interview, studio footage
Filip Åkesson	Himself	Interview, studio footage
Jessie Waits	Himself	Interview
Klas Bergling	Himself	Interview
Anki Lidén	Herself	Interview
Neil Jacobson	Himself	Interview, studio footage
Salem Al Fakir	Himself	Interview, studio footage
Vincent Pontare	Himself	Interview, studio footage
Katie Bain	Herself	Interview
Per Sundin	Himself	Interview
Johnny Tennander	Himself	Interview
Christer Thordson	Himself	Interview

=== Special appearances ===
Alesso, Alex Ebert, Aluna Francis, Ann-Marie Calhoun, Carl Vernersson, Deadmau5, Dhani Lennevald, Fredrik Boberg, Joakim Berg, Jon Bon Jovi, Jose Pasillas, Juicy J, Lucas Thunberg Wessel, Madonna, Mike Posner, Otto Knows, Rachel Aggs, Rihanna, Sandro Cavazza, Sean Eriksson, Sebastian Ingrosso, Semi Badreddine, Steve Aoki, Tiësto, Wyclef Jean

BBC Radio 1 presenter, Greg James makes an uncredited cameo in archival interview footage.

== Track listing ==
- "Death Bed" – Dan Romer and Ben Zeitlin
- "Silhouettes" – Avicii
- "Circles" – Incubus
- "Your Cheatin' Heart" – Ray Charles
- "Fade into Darkness" (Instrumental Club Remix) – Avicii
- "Fade into Darkness" (Albin Mayers Remix) – Albin Myers
- "Wake Me Up" – Avicii, Aloe Blacc
- "Green River" – Creedence Clearwater Revival
- "Without You" – Avicii, Sandro Cavazza
- "Boten Anna" – Basshunter
- "Bromance" – Tim Berg
- "Hey Brother" – Avicii, Dan Tyminski
- "Dukkha" – Avicii
- "I Got a Name" – Jim Croce
- "Rich Girl" – Daryl Hall & John Oates
- "Somewhere in Stockholm" – Avicii
- "Hustlin'" – Rick Boss
- "Feeling Good" – Avicii
- "Peace of Mind" – Avicii, Vargas & Lagola
- "Waiting for Love" – Avicii
- "God Yu Tekem Leaf Blong Mi" – Hanszimmer, Gavin Greenaway
- "Fade" (Avicii 2009 remix) – Solu Music, Kimblee
- "Lise" – Arno Cost
- "As the Earth Kissed the Moon" – Michael Stearns
- "What Does It Take" – Miljon
- "Gonna Love Ya" – Avicii
- "The Otherside" – Cam
- "New New News" (Avicii Meets Yellow Remix) – Bob Sinclair, Queen Ifrica & Makedah
- "Here We Go" – Hard Rock Sofa, Swanky Tunes
- "Fades Away" – Avicii, Nonnie Bao
- "The Tunnel" – Cirez D, Erick Prydz
- "For a Better Day" – Avicii, Alex Ebert
- "SOS" – Avicii, Aloe Blacc
- "Alcoholic" – Tim Berg
- "Black & Blue" – Avicii, Aloe Blacc
- "Levels" – Avicii
- "Good Times" – Chic
- "Addicted to You" – Avicii
- "A Sky Full of Stars" – Coldplay

== Release ==
The documentary was originally announced by Candamo Film in September 2021, with a 2023 release date. The movie began production in 2019. Director Henrik Burman said about the film: "My goal is to provide an honest and new perspective on both the artist Avicii and Tim's life. I want this to be a film that surprises the audience and challenges the public's image of Sweden's biggest international artist of today and, in doing so, also shine a light on what his music has meant to so many people."

The new release date was announced on Avicii's Instagram profile in April 2024. On October 9, 2024, it was announced that the documentary would be official selection at the Stockholm International Film Festival in 2024.

On November 4, 2024, Candamo Film announced that the documentary would be released worldwide on Netflix, starting on December 31, 2024. The documentary was released together with Avicii's last performance at Ushuaïa Ibiza on August 28, 2016, titled Avicii – My Last Show.

== Awards and nominations ==
Year	Awards	Category	Result	Ref.
2024	Stockholm Film Festival	Best Documentary	Nominated	
2024	Guldbagge Awards	Best Editing	Won	
