= So Much Better =

So Much Better may refer to:

- So Much Better (album), an album by singer Carl Thomas
- "So Much Better" (song), a song by Swedish singer Sandro Cavazza, which was also remixed on Swedish DJ Avicii's Avīci (01) EP
- "So Much Better", a song from the musical Legally Blonde
- "So Much Better", a song from Childish Gambino's 2009 mixtape Poindexter
- "So Much Betta", a song by Janet Jackson from her 2008 album Discipline
- "So Much Better", a song from Eminem's 2013 album The Marshall Mathers LP 2
- "So Much Better", a 1999 song by Evan Olson that was rediscovered in 2020 when it was featured as a mysterious earworm on the podcast Reply All
