= Used To (disambiguation) =

"Used To" is a 2018 song by Sandro Cavazza.

Used To may also refer to:

- "Used To", by Daughtry from Daughtry, 2006
- "Used To", by Drake from If You're Reading This It's Too Late, 2015
- "Used To", by Juice Wrld from Goodbye & Good Riddance, 2018
- "Used To", by LeToya Luckett from Back 2 Life, 2017
- "Used To", by Wire from Chairs Missing, 1978
