= Enemy (Sandro Cavazza song) =

Single by Sandro Cavazza
- Released: 26 April 2019
- Genre: Pop
- Length: 3:32
- Label: Ineffable Music, Universal Music
- Songwriter(s): Sandro Cavazza, Victor Thell, Felix Flygare Floderer and Carl Silvergran

Sandro Cavazza singles chronology
| "Used To" (2018) | "Enemy" (2019) | "Forever Yours (Tribute)" (2020) |

"Enemy" is a song by Swedish singer Sandro Cavazza. The song was released on 26 April 2019 and peaked at number 43 in Sweden. Cavazza told Scandipop the song "is about the feeling of not being able to let go, you'd do whatever it takes to keep what you're about to lose." Cavazza told Billboard "The song makes me feel euphoric although it is quite tragic lyrically. I wrote the song with my amazing friend Victor Thell who I work insanely fast with. Half the song was written by me and Victor in Stockholm and the other half in Los Angeles."

== Reception ==
Scandipop said "Pleasingly, he's seemingly taken influence from not just his work with Avicii, but also the Avicii tribute track he made with Kygo "Happy Now". As a result, he's come out with a super-catchy, bop-along-song that is tailor-made for summertime radio."

== Track listing ==
Digital download
| No. | Title | Length |
|---|---|---|
| 1. | "Enemy" | 3:32 |

== Charts ==
| Chart (2019) | Peak position |
|---|---|
| Sweden (Sverigetopplistan) | 43 |

== Certifications ==
| Region | Certification | Certified units/sales |
|---|---|---|
| Sweden (GLF) | Platinum | 8,000,000^{†} |
^{†} Streaming-only figures based on certification alone.

== Release history ==
| Region | Date | Format | Version | Label |
|---|---|---|---|---|
| Various | 26 April 2019 | Streaming; digital download | Original version | Ineffable; Universal |
