= High with Somebody =

Single by Sandro Cavazza and P3GI-13
- Released: 23 March 2018
- Genre: pop
- Length: 2:54
- Label: Ineffable Music, Universal Music
- Songwriter(s): Nicklas Lif & Sandro Cavazza
- Producer(s): Nicklas Lif

Sandro Cavazza singles chronology
"Without You" (2017)	"High with Somebody" (2018)	"Here" (2018)

"High with Somebody" is a song by Swedish singer Sandro Cavazza and P3GI-13. The song was released on 23 March 2018 and peaked at number nine in Sweden.

Talking about writing the song Cavazza said, "I really felt like it was time to write something happy. I hope that this song will be the summer jam for a lot of people."

== Background ==
Cavazza told Entertainment Focus The story is based on a guy he was working with while living in Los Angeles. "He was an insane slacker, he had all the money in the world but he was so indifferent to it. He could throw a house party and while everyone else was having a blast he would just go to bed. He was someone who is really in a "Hakuna Matata" mentality. I live my life the polar opposite, working all the time for everything because I don't believe anything happens just for itself, but it was fun to write a song that is about someone who is absolutely certain that tomorrow everything will be sensational."

The song was co-written with as well as produced by Nicklas Lif, and mixed by Adel Dahdal.

== Music video ==
The music video for "High with Somebody" was directed by Robin Kempe-Bergman, produced by Robinovich and released on 23 March 2018. In a YouTube video released in April 2018, Cavazza said "We were going for a carefree video... me not caring, hence the stone face." Pip Ellwood-Hughes from Entertainment Focus said "The colourful video features Cavazza in bed with a variety of different people, including someone in a rabbit suit, and as it progresses he's seen sat on a couch while people interact around him."

== Reception ==
Scandipop described the song as "A super-catchy, summer-ready, radio-friendly, bop of a tune that sort of meets in the middle of what he delivered with both his debut EP and his Avicii collabs. It's got his own soulful sound, with the slightest of country influences."

== Track listing ==
Digital download
No.	Title	Length
1.	"High with Somebody"	2:54

Digital download
No.	Title	Length
1.	"High with Somebody" (acoustic)	2:53

Digital download
No.	Title	Length
1.	"High with Somebody" (Henri Purnell remix)	3:31
2.	"High with Somebody" (OOVEE remix)	2:47

== Charts ==
=== Weekly charts ===
Chart (2018)	Peak position
Sweden (Sverigetopplistan)	9

=== Year-end charts ===
Chart (2018)	Position
Sweden (Sverigetopplistan)	37

== Certifications ==
Certifications for "High with Somebody"
Region	Certification	Certified units/sales
Sweden (GLF)	3× Platinum	24,000,000^{†}
^{†} Streaming-only figures based on certification alone.

== Release history ==
Region	Date	Format	Version	Label	Ref.
Various	23 March 2018	Streaming; digital download	Original version	Ineffable; Universal	
Various	15 June 2018	Streaming; digital download	Acoustic version	Ineffable; Universal	
Various	27 July 2018	Streaming; digital download	Remixes	Ineffable; Universal	
