= Forever Yours (Tribute) =

Single by Kygo, Avicii and Sandro Cavazza
- Released: 24 January 2020
- Recorded: 2019
- Length: 3:13
- Label: Ineffable Music; Universal Music
- Songwriters: Sting; Jan Kask; Dominic Miller; Tim Bergling; Sebastian Furrer; Kygo; Sandro Cavazza; Marcus Thunberg Wessel
- Producers: Avicii; Kygo

Kygo singles chronology
"Family" (2019)	"Forever Yours (Tribute)" (2020)	"Like It Is" (2020)

Avicii singles chronology
"Fades Away (Tribute Concert Version)" (2019)	"Forever Yours (Tribute)" (2020)	"Beautiful Drug (remix)" (2024)

Sandro Cavazza singles chronology
"Enemy" (2019)	"Forever Yours (Tribute)" (2020)	"Sad Child" (2020)

Audio
- "Kygo, Avicii, Sandro Cavazza - Forever Yours (Avicii Tribute)" on YouTube

Forever Yours (Tim's 2016 Ibiza Version)

"Forever Yours (Tribute)" is a song by Norwegian DJ Kygo, Swedish DJ Avicii and Swedish singer and songwriter Sandro Cavazza. The song was released on 24 January 2020. The song was written by Sting, Jan Kask, Dominic Miller, Tim Bergling, Sebastian Furrer, Kygo, Sandro Cavazza and Marcus Thunberg Wessel.

An alternate version, subtitled "Tim's 2016 Ibiza Version", was released through Pinguettes Recordings and Universal Music Sweden on 14 February 2025. Following the documentaries Avicii – I'm Tim and Avicii – My Last Show in 2025, there was a rising demand among fans for the single to be released. A behind the scenes video of its production was released on Avicii's YouTube channel on the same day. The song features an interpolation of "Shape of My Heart" by Sting, who is credited as a songwriter.

== Background ==
"Forever Yours" is originally a song that Avicii started working on in Malibu in March 2016 after Sandro showed him his demo. At the time, Avicii was taking a roadtrip from Los Angeles to Miami to work on new music that he would premiere at Ultra Music Festival that year. "Forever Yours" was one of several songs worked on during this trip. Later in 2016 Avicii played another version of the track at his Ushuaia closing set. However, Avicii could not release a final version of the song before his death. Norwegian DJ Kygo and Swedish singer and songwriter Sandro Cavazza reproduced the song for official release. Although the entire production was remade from scratch, Cavazza and Kygo took the liberty to use Avicii's chords from the well known UMF 2016 version. Cavazza and Kygo's version was performed at the December 2019 Avicii tribute concert. Cavazza previously featured on Avicii's 2017 single "Without You" and featured on two songs from Avicii's 2015 album Stories, "Gonna Love Ya" and "Sunset Jesus". Sting and Dominic Miller are also credited as "Forever Yours" samples Sting's song "Shape of My Heart".

During his "Crowning of Prince Liam" Tour, Avicii worked on the song in Monument Valley, before performing the first version at Ultra Music Festival. During his 2016 tour, he produced a new version, which he primarily played at his Ibiza residencies. This version was held back from release for almost nine years, until it was featured in the Netflix documentary Avicii - My Last Show. Afterwards, Avicii re-entered the charts for the first time since his death. Pophouse Entertainment and the Tim Bergling Estate officially released this version on 14 February 2025.

== Charts ==
=== Weekly charts ===
Weekly chart performance for "Forever Yours (Tribute)"
Chart (2020)	Peak position
Australia (ARIA)	96
Belgium (Ultratip Bubbling Under Flanders)	8
Belgium (Ultratop 50 Wallonia)	49
Czech Republic Airplay (ČNS IFPI)	5
Germany (GfK)	65
Hungary (Single Top 40)	7
Iceland (Tónlistinn)	31
Ireland (IRMA)	92
Netherlands (Dutch Top 40)	25
Netherlands (Single Top 100)	64
Norway (VG-lista)	5
Poland Airplay (ZPAV)	15
Slovakia Airplay (ČNS IFPI)	32
Sweden (Sverigetopplistan)	4
Switzerland (Schweizer Hitparade)	25
US Dance Club Songs (Billboard)	3
US Hot Dance/Electronic Songs (Billboard)	9

Weekly chart performance for "Forever Yours (Tim's 2016 Ibiza Version)"
Chart (2025)	Peak position
Croatia International Airplay (Top lista)	60
Estonia Airplay (TopHit)	44
UK Singles Sales (OCC)	99

=== Monthly charts ===
Monthly chart performance for "Forever Yours (Tim's 2016 Ibiza Version)"
Chart (2025)	Peak position
Estonia Airplay (TopHit)	54

=== Year-end charts ===
Year-end chart performance for "Forever Yours (Tribute)"
Chart (2020)	Position
Sweden (Sverigetopplistan)	83
US Hot Dance/Electronic Songs (Billboard)	54

== Certifications ==
Certifications for "Forever Yours (Tribute)"
Region	Certification	Certified units/sales
Brazil (Pro-Música Brasil)	Gold	20,000^{‡}
^{‡} Sales+streaming figures based on certification alone.
