= Girl Talk (Dhani Lennevald song) =

Single by Dhani Lennevald
- Released: 2004
- Recorded: 2004
- Genre: Pop, R&B, hip hop
- Length: 2:58
- Label: Universal Music
- Songwriter(s): P. Björklund; J. Blees; K. Johnsson
- Producer(s): P. Björklund; J. Blees

"Girl Talk" is the first single by Swedish pop and R&B music singer Dhani Lennevald, released in September 2004 in Sweden.

The song became moderately successful in his native Sweden, where it peaked at No. 20 on the Single Charts and earned a gold certification for more than 10,000 copies sold of the physical single.

"Girl Talk" spent 9 weeks inside the Swedish Top 60.

== Music video ==
The video for "Girl Talk" was filmed in Stockholm, Sweden on August 17 & 18, and was premiered on September 16 on Swedish Channel TV4.

The video shows Dhani in different places of the city, trying to understand the 'Girl Talks'.

In an attempt to quit the "A*Teens Boy" Image, sexy images of him and a girl were shown on the video, but this failed to get the public's attention. The music video had respectable rotation on Swedish music channels.

The version of the song used on the video, was featuring Nik & Jay, they also appeared on the video.

== Track listing ==
Swedish CD Single

1. "Girl Talk" Radio Version – 2:58
2. "Girl Talk" Active Cut A Rug Remix – 3:39

Swedish CD Maxi

1. "Girl Talk" Radio Version – 2:58
2. "Girl Talk" Featuring Nik & Jay – 2:58
3. "Girl Talk" Featuring Mighty 44 – 2:58
4. "Girl Talk" Antiloop Remix – 5:06

== Charts ==
Chart (2004)	Peak position
Sweden (Sverigetopplistan)	20

== Certifications and sales ==
Region	Certification	Certified units/sales
Sweden (GLF)	Gold	10,000^{^}
^{^} Shipments figures based on certification alone.
