= Blessed (Avicii song) =

- US single cover

Single by Tom Hangs featuring Shermanology
- Released: 23 May 2011
- Recorded: 2007, 2010–2011
- Genre: Progressive house
- Length: 6:47
- Label: Spinnin'; 3 Beat; All Around the World; Robbins
- Songwriters: Tim Bergling; Ash Pournouri; Andy Sherman; Dorothy Sherman
- Producers: Avicii; Ash Pournouri (exec.)

Avicii singles chronology
"iTrack" (2011)	"Blessed" (2011)	"Fade into Darkness" (2011)

Shermanology singles chronology
"Waiting for You" (2011)	"Blessed" (2011)	"Grindin" (2011)

Alternative cover
- UK single cover

Audio
- "Blessed (Original Mix)" on YouTube

"Blessed" is a song by Swedish house producer Avicii (credited under the name Tom Hangs) featuring vocals from Shermanology. Like many of Avicii's early tracks this had been leaked on the internet between late 2010 to April 2011. The track was officially released on May 23, 2011 through Spinnin' Records. It was further released on March 6, 2012 in the United States, and then 3 months later in the United Kingdom on June 21, 2012.

The song was included on Dutch DJ Tiësto's Club Life: Volume One Las Vegas compilation. It was also featured on the Stolichnaya vodka TV advert aired during the UEFA Euro 2012 football tournament.

== Track listing ==
Digital download - single
No.	Title	Length
1.	"Blessed" (Avicii Radio Edit)	3:02
2.	"Blessed" (Avicii Edit)	6:47

== Chart performance ==
=== Weekly charts ===
Chart (2011–12)	Peak position
Belgium Dance (Ultratop Flanders)	44
Belgium (Ultratip Bubbling Under Flanders)	56
Belgium Dance (Ultratop Wallonia)	25
Belgium (Ultratip Bubbling Under Wallonia)	25
France (SNEP)	69
Germany (GfK)	50
Netherlands (Dutch Top 40)	9
Netherlands (Single Top 100)	22
Sweden Heatseeker (Sverigetopplistan)	19
UK Dance (Official Charts)	33
UK Singles (Official Charts Company)	164

=== Year-end charts ===
Chart (2011)	Position
Netherlands (Dutch Top 40)	41

== Release history ==
Region	Date	Format	Label
Netherlands	May 23, 2011	Digital download	Spinnin' Records
Germany	June 17, 2011	Digital download	Tiger Records
France	July 18, 2011	Digital download	Universal / Capitol
United States	March 6, 2012	Digital download	Robbins Entertainment
United Kingdom	June 21, 2012	Digital download	3 Beat / All Around the World
