= Gonna Love Ya =

Song by Avicii featuring Sandro Cavazza

from the album Stories
- Released: 1 October 2015
- Recorded: 2014
- Genre: Tropical house
- Length: 3:36
- Label: Universal Music; PRMD
- Songwriter(s): Tim Bergling; Sandro Cavazza; Dhani Lennevald; Ash Pournouri; Marcus Thunberg Wessel
- Producer(s): Avicii; Ash Pournouri; Dhani Lennevald

Audio
- "Avicii - Gonna Love Ya" on YouTube

"Gonna Love Ya" is a song by Swedish EDM producer Avicii featuring Swedish singer Sandro Cavazza. It was released on 1 October 2015 as a promotional single from the album Stories.

== Charts ==
=== Weekly charts ===
Chart (2015)	Peak position
Norway (VG-lista)	25
Sweden (Sverigetopplistan)	3
US Hot Dance/Electronic Songs (Billboard)	32

=== Year-end charts ===
Chart (2015)	Position
Sweden (Sverigetopplistan)	72

== Certifications ==
Region	Certification	Certified units/sales
Sweden (GLF)	3× Platinum	120,000^{‡}
^{‡} Sales+streaming figures based on certification alone.
