= Levels (Avicii song) =

2011 single by Avicii

Single by Avicii
- Released: 28 October 2011
- Recorded: 2010–2011
- Genre: Progressive house; EDM
- Length: 5:38 (original version); 3:19 (radio edit)
- Label: Universal Music Group
- Songwriters: Tim Bergling; Arash Pournouri; Leroy Kirkland; Etta James
- Producer: Avicii

Avicii singles chronology
"Collide" (2011)	"Levels" (2011)	"Silhouettes" (2012)

Music video
- "Levels" on YouTube

Audio sample
- file; help

"Levels" (Note: Stylised on the cover art as "LE7ELS".) is a song produced by Swedish DJ Avicii. The song premiered as an untitled track on Pete Tong's Essential Mix on BBC Radio 1 on 11 December 2010. Bergling promoted "Levels" through live performances throughout 2011, building anticipation for the song pre-release. Universal Music Group issued it as a single on 28 October 2011 on iTunes. Musically, "Levels" is a progressive house, and EDM track built around a motif, consisting of a synth lead and a chord progression that is asynchronous with the bass and vocal motifs. The song lifts vocal samples from Etta James's "Something's Got a Hold on Me" during a brief intermission.

Following its release, Avicii regularly performed "Levels" in his live performances. A music video, directed by Petro Papahadjopoulos, posted to YouTube on 29 November 2011. The video is about a businessman who inexplicably starts dancing at his workplace, where he is tased unconscious and sent to the hospital. There, upon waking, he influences the hospital's inhabitants to inexplicably dance as well. The music video was nominated for Best Electronic Dance Music Video at the 2012 MTV Video Music Awards.

"Levels" received critical acclaim for its composition. The song was nominated for Best Song at the 2012 Grammy Awards and was also nominated for Best Dance Recording at the 55th Annual Grammy Awards in 2013. It was commercially successful, topping charts in Sweden and Norway and peaking within the top ten in Austria, Belgium, Denmark, the Netherlands, Ireland, Switzerland, and the United Kingdom. Furthermore, it has received platinum certifications in multiple countries, including being certified eight times in Sweden by the GLF. "Levels" served as Bergling's breakout hit and signature song, in addition to being one of the first commercially successful songs released during the 2010s mainstreaming of EDM in the United States.

== Background and release ==
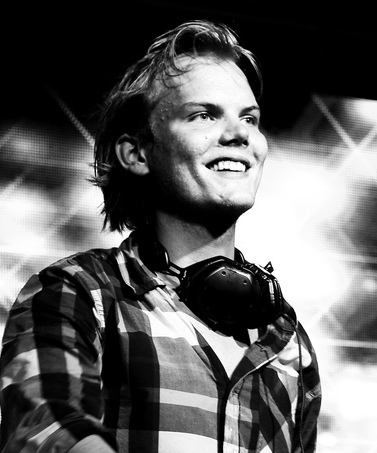
Tim Bergling

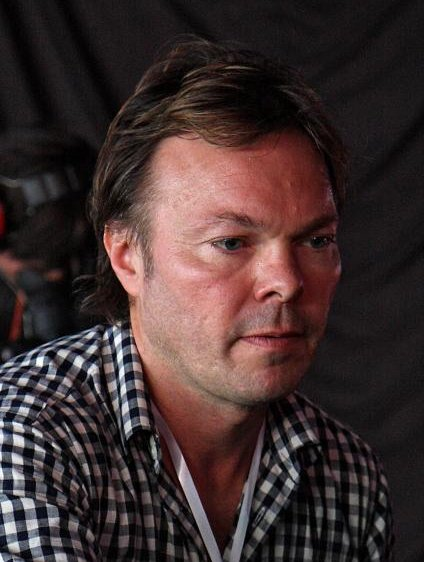
Pete Tong

Bergling (pictured 2011) produced "Levels", and Tong (pictured 2009) hosted BBC Radio 1's Essential Mix, where "Levels" debuted.

Bergling started music production as a teenager; he posted demos on a message board operated by Dutch producer Laidback Luke for feedback on his production. After Bergling won a 2008 BBC Radio 1 competition, the host, Pete Tong, issued the submitted track, "ManMan", as Bergling's first single. A few weeks later, club promoter Arash Pournouri would offer to manage Bergling's career toward success. Bergling adopted the stage name Avicii, named after a Buddhist term for a hell-like afterlife for sinners, and would release additional singles, with "Seek Bromance", a vocal remix of his track "Bromance", achieving mild crossover success.

On the origins of "Levels", Bergling claimed in one interview that he wanted to use a vocal sample from Etta James's "Something's Got a Hold on Me" and was satisfied when combining it with the hook he would use for "Levels". According to a 2015 Quora answer by Bergling, he first discovered the sample in the Pretty Lights song "Finally Moving". Bergling chose to use the sample, he said in another interview, because of the "timeless" and "raw" nature of James' vocals. Following Bergling's death, DJ Mike Posner claimed that he was sent "Levels" by Avicii while it was still in production to provide vocals to it. Posner produced six "toplines" but did not use them, saying that "they were good, but not [...] the thing".

Bergling first premiered an early version of "Levels" on 11 December 2010 as an untitled track for BBC Radio 1's Essential Mix, hosted by Pete Tong. Throughout 2011, he regularly performed "Levels" live in festivals and clubs, debuting the version with the Etta James vocal sample at the Ultra Music Festival 2011. Bergling and Pournouri drew upon these performances to promote the song on social media. During this time, a bootleg leak of "Levels" was posted on YouTube and gained almost 20 million views. The success of "Levels" on social media allowed Pournouri to make a deal with Universal Music Group to release the song as a single in Nordic countries. "Levels" was released via iTunes on 28 October 2011 in Australia, Denmark, Ireland, the Netherlands, the United Kingdom, and Sweden. After another deal brokered by another manager, Troy Carter, "Levels" was released in the United States on 31 October 2011.

== Composition ==
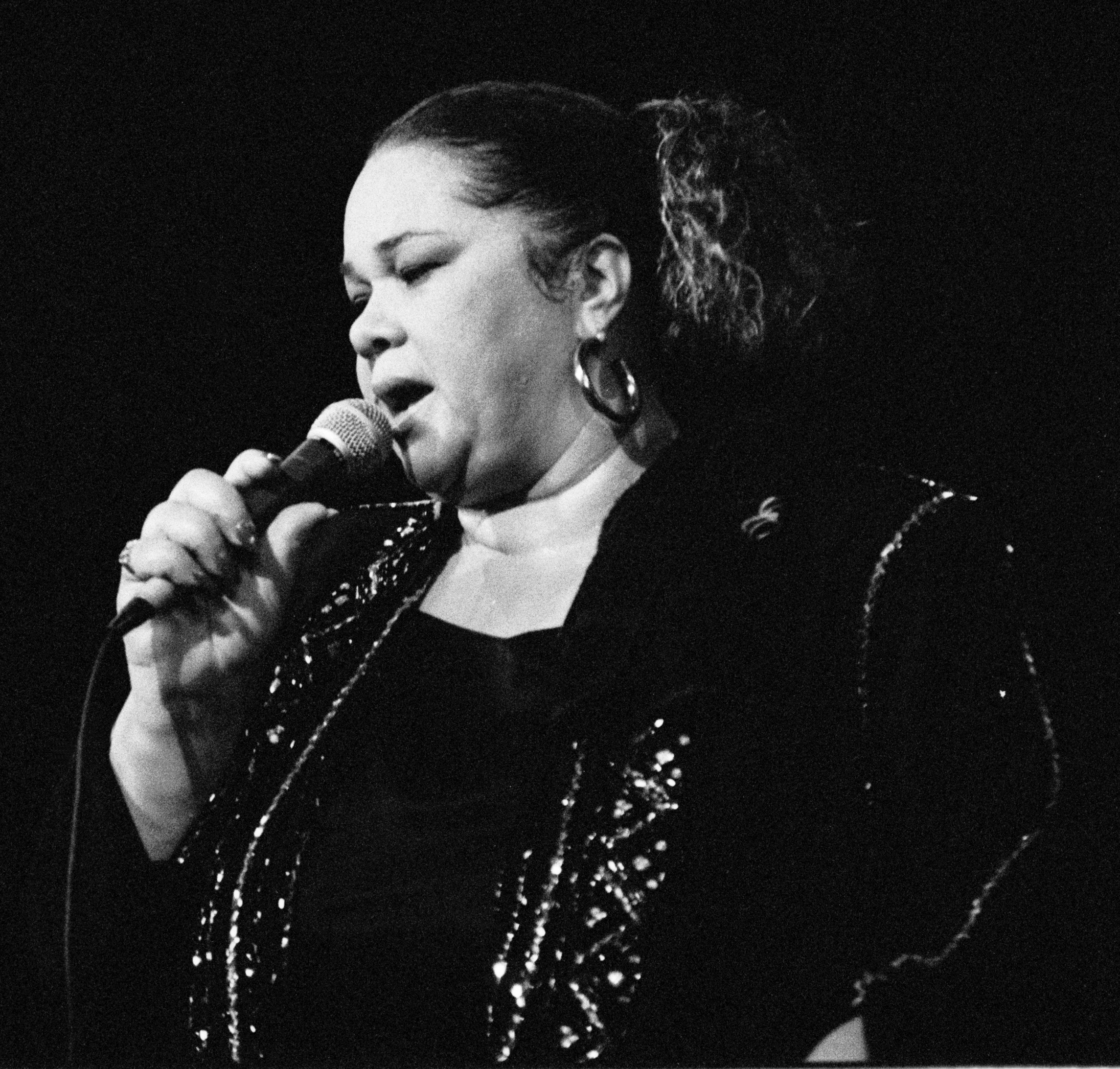
Etta James (pictured in 1990) is sampled in "Levels".

"Levels" is a progressive house, and EDM song, with, according to Vulture, "enough of a nod to old-school rave music in its build to be approachable as a dance track". Composed in C♯ minor with a 4/4 beat, the song is built around a motif consisting of a synth lead and a chord progression (scale degrees i-III-VII-VI) taking the form of synth stabs, mixed together using side-chaining. The synth lead is divided into two similar musical phrases. Both descend from the note C♯4 to E3 before repeating the latter note. The first phrase briefly descends to D♯3 before resolving back at E3, while the second phrase descends to C♯3 and resolves at B2. This main motif starts at the third beat of bar two, while the bass and vocal motifs start at the first bar, making the motifs asynchronous.

During the middle of the song, the motif and beat dissipate into an echo and are briefly absent. A gospel-inspired vocal sample is played, performing the lines "Ohhhh, sometimes, I get a good feeling, yeah / I get a feeling that I never, never, never had before..." The vocal sample is taken from Etta James's "Something's Got a Hold on Me", described by Billboard as "a heavenly siren's call beaming down on the masses". Following a brief moment consisting of melancholic strings arranged in a counterpoint, the motif and beat reappear, augmented by a whistling, rising synth line.

== Critical reception ==
"Levels" received critical acclaim. Future Music found "Levels" interesting for its composition, considering it an example of how "a simple part can become complex". AllMusic described "Levels" as a "simple and effective EDM monster", El Correo called it a "very danceable tune that makes you enjoy it continuously", and Billboard said the single "elevate[s] Avicii from touring DJ wunderkind to formidable electronic artist". One criticism of "Levels" came from MK News, which praised "Levels" for the brevity of the vocals but otherwise criticized the song for being predictable. Among retrospective commentary, Billboard declared "Levels" one of the greatest songs of all time, citing its composition, synth hook, vocal sample, and cultural impact—elements that Vulture also praised. Mixmag predicted that "Levels" would be remembered as Avicii's best song.

"Levels" was nominated for Best Electro/Dance and won Best Song at the 2012 Grammis Awards. It was also for Best Dance Recording at the 55th Annual Grammy Awards in 2013. Both Billboard and Hollywood Reporter ranked "Levels" the best Avicii song. Mixmag ranked "Levels" as the 13th best song of 2011, and Pitchfork, Gaffa, and Dancing Astronaut ranked it among the best songs of the 2010s. Billboard ranked "Levels" as the 344th best pop song, and Rolling Stone ranked "Levels" as the 52nd greatest dance song and the 247th best song of the 21st century.

== Commercial performance ==
"Levels" found the most chart success in Bergling's native Sweden, peaking atop the Swedish charts the week of 11 November 2011 and maintaining this peak position for seven weeks. "Levels" was number 23 on the year-end chart in 2011, number three in 2012, and number 43 in 2013. After leaving the charts in 2013, it returned in the week of 24 April 2018 at number four, remaining on the charts for four months. That same year, it was placed as number 54 on the year-end charts. "Levels" was also on the charts on two non-consecutive weeks in 2019, the week of 4 January as number 94 and the week of 19 April as number 77. It has received a platinum certification eight times from the Swedish Recording Industry Association, indicating that "Levels" has been sold or streamed in Sweden over 320,000 times.

"Levels" was also very successful in the United States, entering the weekly Billboard Hot 100 chart in the week of 11 December 2011 at number 66. "Levels" was the first Avicii song to enter the Hot 100 chart. The song remained on the Hot 100 for 20 weeks, peaking at number 60 on the week of 17 February 2012. On other charts, it stayed on the Mainstream Top 40 for five weeks, peaking at number 33 on 9 March 2012. It peaked at number two on Dance/Mix Show Airplay on 24 February 2012 and was on the chart for 29 weeks, and it topped the Dance Club Songs chart on 30 December 2011, remaining on the latter for 20 weeks. It reached number 32 on the year-end Dance Club Songs chart and number 11 on the year-end Dance/Mix Show Airplay chart. "Levels" was triple-platinum certified by the Recording Industry Association of America, indicating that it was sold or streamed in the US over three million times.

"Levels" was also successful in the UK and Norway. In the UK, "Levels" entered the "Official Singles Chart Top 100" on the week of 27 November 2011 at its peak position of number four. It stayed on the chart for 50 weeks and left the charts after its position of number 96 in the week of 16 September 2012. On the UK's "Official Dance Singles Chart Top 40", it peaked as number one on the week of 25 December 2011. In the year-end charts of the UK, it was number 101 in 2011 and number 59 in 2012. In Norway, "Levels" entered the charts on the week of 7 November 2011 as number four. It peaked as number one on the week of 17 December 2011 and stayed number one for four weeks. It was on the Norwegian charts for around 30 weeks. "Levels" was certified in both the United Kingdom and Norway. In Norway, the International Federation of the Phonographic Industry awarded "Levels" a platinum certification five times, indicating that 50,000 copies were sold in Norway. In the United Kingdom, "Levels" earned a three-times platinum certification from the British Phonographic Industry, indicating that it was sold and streamed 1,800,000 times in the United Kingdom. In other nations, it reached a peak position of number five in Switzerland, number four in Austria, the Netherlands, and Belgium, and number three in Denmark and Ireland. "Levels" has also received a platinum certification at least once from Australia, Austria, Belgium, Denmark, Germany, Italy, and Switzerland.

== Music video ==
According to director Petro Papahadjopoulos, he was approached by Universal Music Group for the concept of a music video for Bergling that would make him famous. Papahadjopoulos contacted Bergling to understand the symbolism behind "Levels" and to create a concept that would match the song. Papahadjopoulos created a concept based on Office Space that he described as "about a man who wakes up to realize he is living in hell. Everyone around him just thinks he's crazy. But his craziness is infectious." Avicii later received the concept of the music video from Pournouri and showed support for it. He posted the concept on his official website on 8 December 2011. Papahadjopoulos collaborated with Richie Greenfield for direction and choreography of the music video. It was ultimately released to YouTube on 29 November 2011. The music video was nominated for "Best Electronic Dance Music Video" at the 2012 MTV Video Music Awards.

According to a concept booklet, the plot of the music video represents the idea that "we are living already [sic] in Avici, and that maybe we at times are aware of this and the existence of other levels. [...] We watch as the man's reality implodes, he's experiencing awareness of other levels and his entire reality all around him transforms to something new." The music video depicts a weary businessman (Greenfield) working at an office, who suddenly starts dancing. A security guard walks into the office and stuns the businessman unconscious, leading him to dream of pushing a big boulder up a mountain, mirroring Sisyphus' fate, as he is restrained to a hospital bed. Two hospital workers notice and touch a flower that blooms from the businessman's mouth. Afterward, all three go into a seizure before quickly recovering and proceeding to dance, influencing the rest of the hospital's inhabitants to do the same.

== Live performances ==
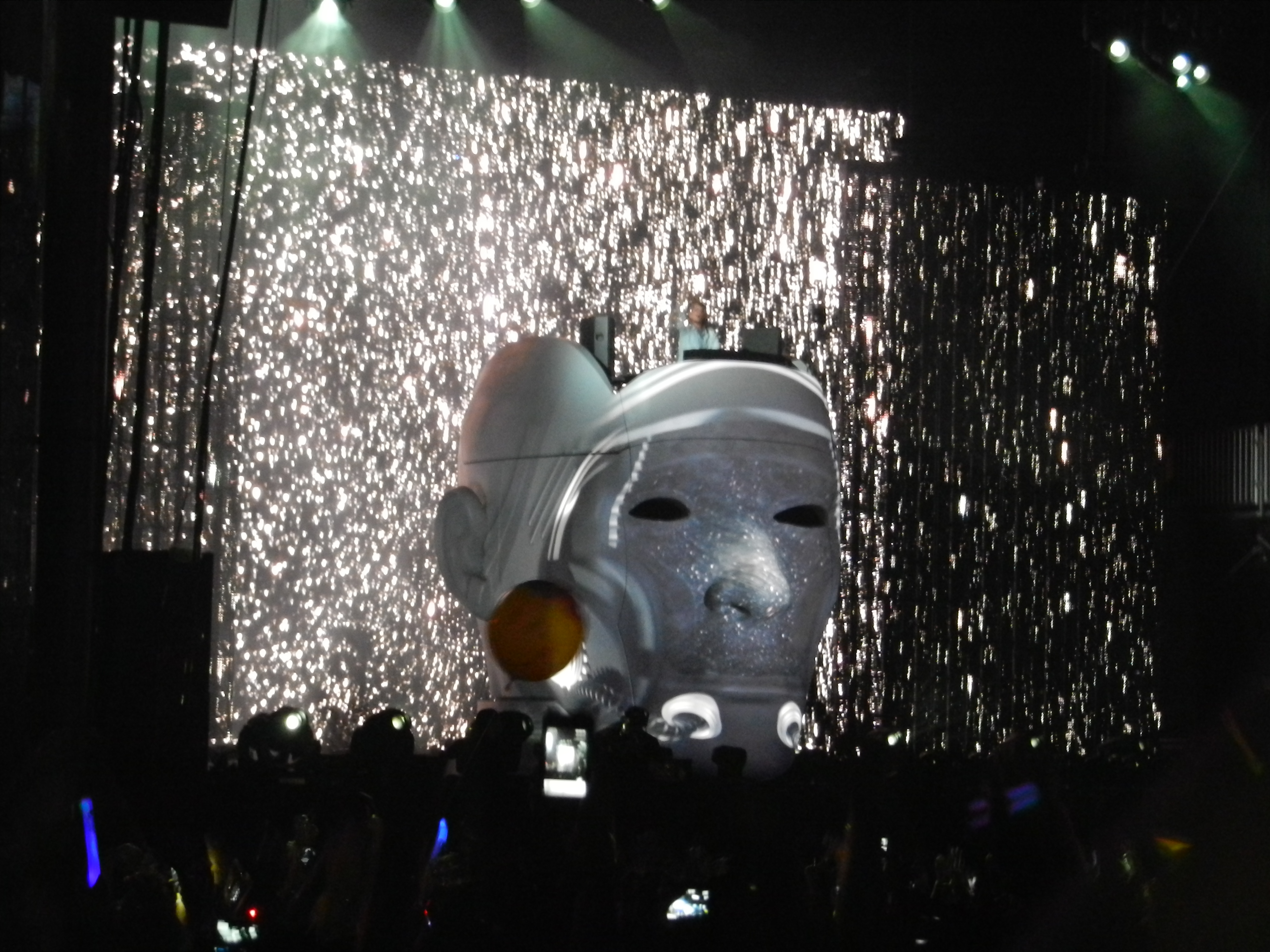
Bergling performing "Levels" at the Lollapalooza 2012

Prior to the single's release, Bergling toured in promotion of the release of "Levels", playing it at various festivals and clubs throughout 2011. During this time, "Levels" became a popular dance song, leading Bergling to travel across the United States to take advantage of the song's popularity, with Malik Adunni and Felix Alfonso acting as tour managers. He first premiered "Levels" with the Etta James vocal sample at the Ultra Music Festival in Miami, Florida, in March 2011. Bergling also performed "Levels" that year at the Electric Daisy Carnival in June and at Tomorrowland in July. That year, Billboard called "Levels" the "dance anthem of the summer festival season". Shortly after the release of the single, Avicii performed "Levels" at the Bounce Festival and the Stereosonic in Sydney, both of which Dancing Astronaut called early indicators of the song's status as a classic.

"Levels" remained a recurring song in Bergling's live performances. In April 2012, Bergling opened with "Levels" at Coachella, during which he debuted visuals that he would utilize in an all-arena tour, titled the "Le7els Tour", though production issues delayed the tour from May to June 2012, with many locations canceled. Later that year in August, Avicii opened his appearance at Lollapalooza with "Levels". At Ultra Music Festival 2013, Avicii performed "Levels" prior to his controversial premiere of "Wake Me Up". Though he consistently toured since 2010, Bergling suffered health issues such as pancreatitis that forced him to retire from touring in 2016. His final performance was at the Ushuaïa Ibiza Beach Hotel, during which he performed "Levels". After his death in April 2018, a tribute concert run by his family was performed in December 2019, featuring multiple guest stars, with "Levels" serving as the closer, paired with images of the late Bergling.

== Legacy ==
Electronic dance music received little attention in the United States throughout the 2000s. In the early 2010s, a group of electronic dance music styles, referred to by the music industry as the umbrella term "EDM", became commercially mainstream in the United States through festivals and artists such as Bergling, Skrillex, and Deadmau5. Examples of these styles included brostep and house music. Mixmag defined the overall EDM sound as being "drop-heavy, stadium-filling, fist-pumping, chart-topping, [and] massively commercial". "Levels" was among the first commercially successful songs within the rise of EDM, allowing electronic music to cross over into pop music. Furthermore, "Levels" served as Bergling's signature song and breakout hit. Billboard named "Levels" among the songs that defined the 2010s, attributing the careers of EDM artists such as The Chainsmokers and Marshmello to the song's success. According to DJMag in 2018, "'Levels' continues to be one of dance music's most successful crossover hits, proving equally anthemic on festival stages and mainstream radio to this day". "Levels" was voted as the festival Tomorrowland's biggest song in May 2020 and passed 1 billion streams on Spotify in September 2024.

Multiple EDM producers and DJs have remixed "Levels", including Skrillex, whose version was included on an official remix EP. Avicii himself also released a remix of the song, "Indian Levels", featuring Indian playback singer Sonu Nigam in November 2012. Rapper Flo Rida sampled James' "Something's Got a Hold of Me" in "Good Feeling" after hearing its usage in "Levels"; the song reached the top five on the Hot 100. Additionally, some EDM producers and DJs have praised "Levels". Joe Bermudez said that "Avicii's uplifting chord progressions instantly transport club goers to euphoric state". Following Bergling's death, Skrillex said that although they were not close friends, "the connection [they] had" through "Levels" made his death saddening. and Felix Jaehn claimed that "Levels" inspired him to make music. Zedd considered it the one song he wished he had produced, saying, "there is something about the genius simplicity of this song; the unbelievably anthemic and powerful emotion I feel when I hear it". Furthermore, several DJs have played "Levels" in their live performances in tribute to Avicii, such as Tiësto at the Electric Daisy Carnival in May 2018, and Hardwell and Oliver Heldens at Tomorrowland in July 2024.

== Track listing ==
Digital download
No.	Title	Length
1.	"Levels"	3:19

Digital download – EP
No.	Title	Length
1.	"Levels" (Radio Edit)	3:19
2.	"Levels" (Original Version)	5:38
3.	"Levels" (Instrumental Radio Edit)	3:19
4.	"Levels" (Instrumental Version)	5:38
Total length:		17:54

Digital download – Remixes EP
No.	Title	Length
1.	"Levels"	5:38
2.	"Levels" (Skrillex Remix)	4:41
3.	"Levels" (Cazzette's NYC Mode Mix)	5:54
4.	"Levels" (Instrumental)	5:38
Total length:		21:51

CD – EP
No.	Title	Length
1.	"Levels" (Radio Version)	3:19
2.	"Levels" (Skrillex Remix)	4:38
3.	"Levels" (Cazzette's NYC Mode Mix)	5:55
4.	"Levels" (Instrumental)	5:36
5.	"Levels"	5:36
Total length:		25:04

== Charts ==
=== Weekly charts ===
2011–2012 weekly chart performance for "Levels"
Chart (2011–2012)	Peak position
Australia (ARIA)	24
Austria (Ö3 Austria Top 40)	4
Belgium (Ultratop 50 Flanders)	4
Belgium (Ultratop 50 Wallonia)	5
Canada Hot 100 (Billboard)	36
Canada CHR/Top 40 (Billboard)	40
CIS Airplay (TopHit)	3
Czech Republic Airplay (ČNS IFPI)	9
Denmark (Tracklisten)	3
Finland (Suomen virallinen lista)	10
France (SNEP)	14
Germany (GfK)	6
Hungary (Dance Top 40)	1
Hungary (Rádiós Top 40)	1
Ireland (IRMA)	3
Italy (FIMI)	4
Luxembourg (Billboard)	5
Netherlands (Dutch Top 40)	4
Netherlands (Mega Dance Top 30)	1
Netherlands (Single Top 100)	4
Norway (VG-lista)	1
New Zealand (Recorded Music NZ)	14
Poland Dance (ZPAV)	3
Romania (Romanian Top 100)	36
Russia Airplay (TopHit)	3
Scottish Singles Sales (Official Charts)	1
Slovakia Airplay (ČNS IFPI)	1
Spain (Promusicae)	28
Sweden (Sverigetopplistan)	1
Switzerland (Schweizer Hitparade)	5
Ukraine Airplay (TopHit)	40
UK Singles (Official Charts)	4
UK Dance (Official Charts)	1
US Billboard Hot 100	60
US Pop Airplay (Billboard)	33
US Dance Club Songs (Billboard)	1

2013 weekly chart performance for "Levels"
Chart (2013)	Peak position
CIS Airplay (TopHit)	63
Russia Airplay (TopHit)	60

2014 weekly chart performance for "Levels"
Chart (2014)	Peak position
CIS Airplay (TopHit)	137
Russia Airplay (TopHit)	129

2015 weekly chart performance for "Levels"
Chart (2015)	Peak position
CIS Airplay (TopHit)	183
Russia Airplay (TopHit)	177

2016 weekly chart performance for "Levels"
Chart (2016)	Peak position
Ukraine Airplay (TopHit)	49

2017 weekly chart performance for "Levels"
Chart (2017)	Peak position
Ukraine Airplay (TopHit)	134

2018–2019 weekly chart performance of "Levels"
Chart (2018–2019)	Peak position
Canada Hot 100 (Billboard)	28
Japan Hot 100 (Billboard)	86
Sweden (Sverigetopplistan)	3
US Hot Dance/Electronic Songs (Billboard)	4

2024 weekly chart performance for "Levels"
Chart (2024)	Peak position
Moldova Airplay (TopHit)	139

2025 weekly chart performance for "Levels"
Chart (2025)	Peak position
Moldova Airplay (TopHit)	134

2026 weekly chart performance for "Levels",
Chart (2026)	Peak position
Colombia Anglo Airplay (National-Report)	3

=== Monthly charts ===
2011 monthly chart performance for "Levels"
Chart (2011)	Peak position
CIS Airplay (TopHit)	83
Russia Airplay (TopHit)	85
Ukraine Airplay (TopHit)	81

2012 monthly chart performance for "Levels"
Chart (2012)	Peak position
CIS Airplay (TopHit)	5
Russia Airplay (TopHit)	4
Ukraine Airplay (TopHit)	48

2013 monthly chart performance for "Levels"
Chart (2013)	Peak position
CIS Airplay (TopHit)	73
Russia Airplay (TopHit)	65

=== Year-end charts ===
2011 year-end chart performance of "Levels"
Chart (2011)	Position
Germany (Official German Charts)	75
Hungary (Dance Top 40)	27
Italy (Musica e dischi)	88
Netherlands (Dutch Top 40)	38
Netherlands (Single Top 100)	48
Poland (Dance Top 50)	63
Sweden (Sverigetopplistan)	21

2012 year-end chart performance of "Levels"
Chart (2012)	Position
Australia (ARIA)	76
Austria (Ö3 Austria Top 40)	23
Belgium (Ultratop Flanders)	24
Belgium (Ultratop Wallonia)	29
CIS Airplay (TopHit)	12
France (SNEP)	63
Germany (Official German Charts)	23
Hungary (Dance Top 40)	3
Hungary (Rádiós Top 40)	11
Italy (FIMI)	42
Netherlands (Dutch Top 40)	77
Netherlands (Single Top 100)	100
Russia Airplay (TopHit)	9
Sweden (Sverigetopplistan)	3
Switzerland (Schweizer Hitparade)	19
UK Singles (OCC)	59
US Dance Club Songs (Billboard)	32
US Dance Singles Sales (Billboard)	3
US On-Demand Songs (Billboard)	35

2013 year-end chart performance of "Levels"
Chart (2013)	Position
CIS Airplay (TopHit)	135
Russia Airplay (TopHit)	119
Sweden (Sverigetopplistan)	43
US Dance Singles Sales (Billboard)	5

2018 year-end chart performance of "Levels"
Chart (2018)	Position
Sweden (Sverigetopplistan)	54
US Hot Dance/Electronic Songs (Billboard)	58

=== Decade-end charts ===
2010s decade-end chart performance for "Levels"
Chart (2010–2019)	Position
CIS Airplay (TopHit)	194
Russia Airplay (TopHit)	145

== Certifications ==
Certifications for "Levels"
Region	Certification	Certified units/sales
Australia (ARIA)	7× Platinum	490,000^{‡}
Austria (IFPI Austria)	Platinum	30,000^{*}
Belgium (BRMA)	Platinum	30,000^{*}
Brazil (Pro-Música Brasil)	Diamond	250,000^{‡}
Canada (Music Canada)	Gold	40,000^{*}
Denmark (IFPI Danmark)	Platinum	30,000^{^}
Germany (BVMI)	3× Platinum	900,000^{‡}
Italy (FIMI)	2× Platinum	60,000^{‡}
Netherlands (NVPI)	4× Platinum	80,000^{^}
New Zealand (RMNZ)	4× Platinum	120,000^{‡}
Norway (IFPI Norway)	5× Platinum	50,000^{*}
Portugal (AFP)	Gold	10,000^{‡}
Spain (Promusicae)	Platinum	60,000^{‡}
Sweden (GLF)	8× Platinum	320,000^{‡}
Switzerland (IFPI Switzerland)	2× Platinum	60,000^{^}
United Kingdom (BPI)	3× Platinum	1,800,000^{‡}
United States (RIAA)	3× Platinum	3,000,000^{‡}
Streaming
Denmark (IFPI Danmark)	3× Platinum	2,700,000^{†}
^{*} Sales figures based on certification alone.^{^} Shipments figures based on certification alone.^{‡} Sales+streaming figures based on certification alone.^{†} Streaming-only figures based on certification alone.

== Release history ==
Release history of "Levels"
Country	Date	Format	Label	Ref
Australia	28 October 2011	Digital download	Universal Music Group	
Denmark	28 October 2011	Digital download	Universal Music Group	
Ireland	28 October 2011	Digital download	Universal Music Group	
Netherlands	28 October 2011	Digital download	Universal Music Group	
Sweden	28 October 2011	Digital download	Universal Music Group	
United Kingdom	28 October 2011	Digital download	Universal Music Group	
United States	31 October 2011	Digital download	Universal Music Group	

== See also ==
- List of number-one dance singles of 2011 (U.S.)

== Sources ==
- Mosesson, Måns (2021). Tim: The Official Biography of Avicii. Translated by Bradley Harmon. Sphere Books. ISBN 9780751579000.
- Ptatscheck, Melanie (6 May 2021). "Avicii and the Mental Health of EDM Stars". In Mazierska, Ewa; Rigg, Tony; Gillon, Les (eds.). The Evolution of Electronic Dance Music. Bloomsbury Publishing. ISBN 9781501366383.
- Snoman, Rick (14 January 2019). "Composing and designing leads". Dance Music Manual (4th ed.). Routledge. ISBN 9780429843891.
