= Avīci (01) =

EP by Avicii
- Released: 10 August 2017
- Recorded: 2016–2017
- Genres: Progressive house; dance-pop; folktronica; tropical house
- Length: 17:43
- Labels: Avicii; Geffen
- Producer: Avicii

Avicii chronology
Stories (2015)	Avīci (01) (2017)	Tim (2019)

Singles from Avīci (01)
- 1. "Without You" Released: 11 August 2017; 2. "Lonely Together" Released: 11 August 2017

Avīci (01) is the fourth and final extended play by Swedish DJ and record producer Avicii, serving as the last release in his lifetime. It was released through Avicii Music on 10 August 2017.

== Background ==
On 27 June 2017, Rita Ora debuted a semi-acoustic version of "Lonely Together" at a private event at Annabel's in London. Avicii then shared one-minute snippets on Instagram, captioned "New music coming very very (very) soon!", with track titles as hashtags, followed by teasers of each track from the EP upon release. He said of the release: "I'm really excited to be back with music once again. It has been a long time since I released anything and a long time since I was this excited over new music! My focus on this first EP of the album was to get a mix of new and old songs: some that fans have been asking about and waiting for mixed with brand new songs that they have never been heard before!"

In an interview with Pete Tong on BBC Radio 1, Avicii stated: "It's the first EP of 3, so the whole album will be released with the third EP." However, after Avicii's death in 2018, the EPs were cancelled and replaced with the posthumous release of Tim in 2019. As of August 2025, (01) remains the only EP in the series released.

== Critical reception ==
Professional ratings
Review scores
Source	Rating
Renowned for Sound	3/5 stars

Ryan Milk of Dancing Astronaut labelled the EP as a "refreshed and reenergized take on [Avicii's] happy, upbeat progressive style". Brian Bonavoglia from DJ Times wrote that Avīci (01) featured Avicii returning to his roots with tracks that contain his "signature production style built around infectious melodies" which "create the uplifting energy that helped propel him into stardom". Renowned For Sound's Haydon Benfield felt that although the tracks were "tightly focused and highly polished" in their production, they lacked elements which were worthy of praise. The critic concluded by describing Avicii's style as "interminable, incessant, and uninterrupted."

== Track listing ==
Digital download
No.	Title	Writer(s)	Producer(s)	Length
1.	"Friend of Mine" (featuring Vargas & Lagola)	Tim Bergling; Vincent Pontare; Salem Al Fakir	Bergling	2:39
2.	"Lonely Together" (featuring Rita Ora)	Benjamin Levin; Ali Tamposi; Bergling; Brian Lee; Magnus August Høiberg; Andrew Wotman	Bergling; Benny Blanco; Andrew Watt; Cashmere Cat	3:01
3.	"You Be Love" (featuring Billy Raffoul)	Hillary Lindsey; Nathan Chapman; Bergling; Billy Raffoul	Bergling	3:27
4.	"Without You" (featuring Sandro Cavazza)	Carl Falk; Bergling; Pontare; Dhani Lennevald; Fakir; Alessandro Cavazza	Bergling; Falk	3:01
5.	"What Would I Change It To" (featuring AlunaGeorge)	Bergling; Mike Einziger; Aluna Francis	Bergling	2:58
6.	"So Much Better" (Avicii remix)	Bergling; Felix Flygare Floderer; Carl Silvergran; Cavazza	Bergling	2:37
Total length:				17:43

Japan bonus track
No.	Title	Length
7.	"Without You" (acoustic version) (featuring Sandro Cavazza)

Notes

- "Lonely Together" features additional vocals by Ali Tamposi, Brian Lee and Andrew Watt.
- "Without You" features backing vocals by Carl Falk, Dhani Lennevald and Marcus Thunberg Wessel.
- "So Much Better" features vocals by Sandro Cavazza.
- Originally the song "Ride Away" or "Let's Ride Away" was going to be released on this album, with vocals by Kacey Musgraves.

== Charts ==
=== Weekly charts ===
Chart (2017–18)	Peak position
Australian Albums (ARIA)	14
Austrian Albums (Ö3 Austria)	9
Canadian Albums (Billboard)	14
Danish Albums (Hitlisten)	3
French Albums (SNEP)	57
German Albums (Offizielle Top 100)	37
Irish Albums (IRMA)	16
Italian Albums (FIMI)	18
Japan Hot Albums (Billboard Japan)	2
Latvian Albums (DigiTop100)	10
New Zealand Albums (RMNZ)	34
Scottish Albums (Official Charts)	22
Swedish Albums (Sverigetopplistan)	1
Swiss Albums (Schweizer Hitparade)	11
US Billboard 200	52
US Top Dance Albums (Billboard)	2

=== Year-end charts ===
Chart (2017)	Position
Danish Albums (Hitlisten)	54
Swedish Albums (Sverigetopplistan)	2
US Top Dance/Electronic Albums (Billboard)	20

Chart (2018)	Position
Danish Albums (Hitlisten)	53
Icelandic Albums (Plötutíóindi)	79
Swedish Albums (Sverigetopplistan)	2
US Top Dance/Electronic Albums (Billboard)	20

Chart (2019)	Position
Swedish Albums (Sverigetopplistan)	14

Chart (2020)	Position
Swedish Albums (Sverigetopplistan)	44

Chart (2021)	Position
Swedish Albums (Sverigetopplistan)	66

== Certifications ==
Region	Certification	Certified units/sales
Denmark (IFPI Danmark)	2× Platinum	40,000^{‡}
Italy (FIMI)	Gold	25,000^{‡}
New Zealand (RMNZ)	3× Platinum	45,000^{‡}
Poland (ZPAV)	Gold	10,000^{‡}
Singapore (RIAS)	Gold	5,000^{*}
^{*} Sales figures based on certification alone.^{‡} Sales+streaming figures based on certification alone.
