= Used To =

2018 song by Sandro Cavazza feat. Lou Elliotte

Single by Sandro Cavazza featuring Lou Elliotte
- Released: 9 November 2018
- Genre: pop
- Length: 2:54
- Label: Ineffable Music, Universal Music
- Songwriters: Felix Flygare Floderer; Litens Anton Nilsson; Carl Silvergran; SHY Martin; Lou Elliotte; Sandro Cavazza

Sandro Cavazza singles chronology
"Happy Now" (2018)	"Used To" (2018)	"Enemy" (2019)

Lou Elliotte singles chronology
"Used To" (2018)

Music video
- "Used To" on YouTube

"Used To" is a song by Swedish singer Sandro Cavazza featuring Lou Elliotte. The song was released on 9 November 2018 and peaked at number 63 in Sweden. Remixes were released in February 2019.

Cavazza said "We wrote the song as a duet picturing a lost relationship, a couple dreaming about how it used to be perfect and not understanding how it all went wrong."

== Music video ==
The music video for "Used To" was directed by Robin Kempe-Bergman, produced by Robinovich and released on 15 November 2018. Cavazza and Elliotte worked on the video clip for over a year, filming footage and taking pictures across Europe in cities including Oslo, London and Paris. Cavazza said "We wanted to make the video as relatable and genuine as possible, therefore we took thousands of pictures just so that people will be able to feel that it's real".

== Track listing ==
Digital download
No.	Title	Length
1.	"Used To"	2:54

Digital download (Remixes)
No.	Title	Length
1.	"Used To" (Ruhde mix)	3:08
2.	"Used To" (Beauz remix)	2:54

== Charts ==
Chart (2018)	Peak position
Sweden (Sverigetopplistan)	63

== Certifications ==
Region	Certification	Certified units/sales
Sweden (GLF)	Gold	4,000,000^{†}
^{†} Streaming-only figures based on certification alone.

== Release history ==
Region	Date	Format	Version	Label
Various	9 November 2018	Streaming; digital download	Original version	Ineffable; Universal
Various	22 February 2019	Streaming; digital download	Remixes	Ineffable; Universal
