= Happy Now (Kygo song) =

2018 single by Kygo featuring Sandro Cavazza

Single by Kygo featuring Sandro Cavazza
- Released: 26 October 2018
- Recorded: 2018
- Genre: Tropical house
- Length: 3:31
- Songwriters: Kyrre Gørvell-Dahll; Sandro Cavazza
- Producer: Kyrre Gørvell-Dahll

Kygo singles chronology
"Born to Be Yours" (2018)	"Happy Now" (2018)	"Think About You" (2019)

Sandro Cavazza singles chronology
"Here" (2018)	"Happy Now" (2018)	"Used To" (2018)

Music video
- "Happy Now" on YouTube

"Happy Now" is a 2018 song by Norwegian DJ Kygo featuring the vocals of Swedish singer Sandro Cavazza. It was released on 26 October 2018 and became a big hit in Norway and Sweden, and it charted in a number of European charts and in Australia.

== Background ==
The song originally debuted at 2018 iHeartRadio Music Festival. Kygo stated in a press release he recorded it in Los Angeles before the Summer, explaining: "I discovered Cavazza through Avicii's music and have been a big fan ever since, We talked a lot about how much Avicii's music has meant to us".

== Content ==
"Happy Now" is believed to be his tribute to the late Avicii. Will Heffernan of Celebmix wrote that has "classic Kygo sounds and a lyrical message of loss". It is written in the key of A major, with a tempo of 118 beats per minute.

== Critical reception ==
Karlie Powell of Your EDM commented that it "sound[s] like a little glimmer of happiness, though it’s a tinge bittersweet. Allow it to move your emotions with every play through".

== Music video ==
An accompanying video was released on 1 December 2018. Starring himself, he takes the viewer to an inside look of his own family and friends, in Norway where he grew up.

== Credits and personnel ==
Credits adapted from AllMusic.

- Sandro Cavazza – featured artist
- Kygo – featured artist, primary artist

== Charts ==
=== Weekly charts ===
Chart (2018–2020)	Peak position
Australia (ARIA)	50
Austria (Ö3 Austria Top 40)	53
Belgium (Ultratop 50 Flanders)	26
Belgium (Ultratop 50 Wallonia)	13
Belgium Dance (Ultratop Wallonia)	1
Czech Republic Airplay (ČNS IFPI)	4
Czech Republic Singles Digital (ČNS IFPI)	31
Finland (Suomen virallinen lista)	13
France (SNEP)	168
Germany (GfK)	53
Hungary (Rádiós Top 40)	6
Hungary (Single Top 40)	16
Hungary (Stream Top 40)	22
Netherlands (Dutch Top 40)	19
Netherlands (Single Top 100)	24
Norway (VG-lista)	6
Poland Airplay (ZPAV)	28
Portugal (AFP)	58
Romania (Airplay 100)	40
Scottish Singles Sales (Official Charts)	50
Slovakia Airplay (ČNS IFPI)	26
Slovakia Singles Digital (ČNS IFPI)	22
Slovenia (SloTop50)	43
Sweden (Sverigetopplistan)	3
Switzerland (Schweizer Hitparade)	20
US Hot Dance/Electronic Songs (Billboard)	12

=== Year-end charts ===
Chart (2018)	Position
Netherlands (Dutch Top 40)	100

Chart (2019)	Position
Belgium (Ultratop Flanders)	63
Belgium (Ultratop Wallonia)	89
Hungary (Rádiós Top 40)	37
Portugal (AFP)	197
Romania (Airplay 100)	92
Sweden (Sverigetopplistan)	46
US Hot Dance/Electronic Songs (Billboard)	38

Chart (2020)	Position
Hungary (Rádiós Top 40)	17

== Certifications ==
Region	Certification	Certified units/sales
Australia (ARIA)	Gold	35,000^{‡}
Belgium (BRMA)	Gold	20,000^{‡}
Denmark (IFPI Danmark)	Gold	45,000^{‡}
France (SNEP)	Gold	100,000^{‡}
Germany (BVMI)	Gold	200,000^{‡}
Italy (FIMI)	Platinum	70,000^{‡}
Mexico (AMPROFON)	Platinum	60,000^{‡}
New Zealand (RMNZ)	Platinum	30,000^{‡}
Poland (ZPAV)	Platinum	20,000^{‡}
Spain (Promusicae)	Platinum	60,000^{‡}
Switzerland (IFPI Switzerland)	Gold	10,000^{‡}
United Kingdom (BPI)	Silver	200,000^{‡}
Streaming
Sweden (GLF)	3× Platinum	24,000,000^{†}
^{‡} Sales+streaming figures based on certification alone.^{†} Streaming-only figures based on certification alone.
