= Silhouettes (Avicii song) =

2012 single by Avicii

Single by Avicii
- Released: 27 April 2012
- Recorded: 2011–2012
- Genre: Progressive house
- Length: 7:00 (Original mix) 3:31 (Radio edit)
- Label: Universal Music
- Songwriters: Tim Bergling, Arash Pournouri, Salem Al Fakir
- Producer: Avicii

Avicii singles chronology
"Levels" (2011)	"Silhouettes" (2012)	"Superlove" (2012)

"Silhouettes" is a song by Swedish house producer and DJ Avicii featuring uncredited vocals from Swedish singer Salem Al Fakir. The track was first released on 27 April 2012 in the United Kingdom. It had previously been leaked on the internet in early 2011, albeit with a different song pitch. Some music blogs erroneously posted "Flash" by Tatana and Scaloni.

== Track listing ==
Digital download
No.	Title	Length
1.	"Silhouettes" (original radio edit)	3:31
2.	"Silhouettes" (original mix)	7:00

Silhouettes (Remixes) – Digital download
No.	Title	Length
1.	"Silhouettes" (EDX's Arena Club Mix)	5:47
2.	"Silhouettes" (Syn Cole Creamfields Mix)	6:23
3.	"Silhouettes" (Lazy Rich Remix)	6:29

== Chart performance ==
For the week ending 11 May 2012, "Silhouettes" debuted at number fifty on the Irish Singles Chart. The track marked Avicii's fourth appearance on the chart, following "Seek Bromance", "Collide", and "Levels" - which peaked at number forty-nine and number three respectively.

== Music video ==
A music video was released on YouTube on 7 June 2012. The music video shows a person, presumably a trans woman, before and after undergoing gender-affirming surgery, and how the surgery improves their social life. An alternate version just featuring Avicii performing at various venues in the United States has also been produced.

== Charts ==
=== Weekly charts ===
Chart (2012)	Peak position
Australia (ARIA)	53
Austria (Ö3 Austria Top 40)	26
Belgium (Ultratip Bubbling Under Flanders)	4
Belgium (Ultratip Bubbling Under Wallonia)	29
Denmark (Tracklisten)	27
Finland (Suomen virallinen lista)	11
Germany (GfK)	87
Hungary (Dance Top 40)	25
Hungary (Rádiós Top 40)	12
Ireland (IRMA)	27
Netherlands (Single Top 100)	43
Scotland Singles (OCC)	12
Sweden (Sverigetopplistan)	11
UK Dance (OCC)	5
UK Singles (OCC)	22
US Dance Club Songs (Billboard)	4
US Dance/Mix Show Airplay (Billboard)	9

Chart (2018)	Peak position
US Hot Dance/Electronic Songs (Billboard)	23

=== Year-end charts ===
Chart (2012)	Position
Hungary (Dance Top 40)	98
Sweden (Sverigetopplistan)	27
UK Singles (Official Charts Company)	145
US Dance/Mix Show Airplay (Billboard)	23

== Certifications ==
Region	Certification	Certified units/sales
Australia (ARIA)	Platinum	70,000^{‡}
Brazil (Pro-Música Brasil) Original Mix	Gold	30,000^{‡}
Brazil (Pro-Música Brasil)	Gold	30,000^{‡}
New Zealand (RMNZ)	Gold	15,000^{‡}
Sweden (GLF)	3× Platinum	120,000^{‡}
United Kingdom (BPI)	Gold	400,000^{‡}
Streaming
Denmark (IFPI Danmark)	Platinum	1,800,000^{†}
^{‡} Sales+streaming figures based on certification alone.^{†} Streaming-only figures based on certification alone.

== Release history ==
Region	Date	Format	Label
United Kingdom	27 April 2012	Digital download	Universal Music
