= So Much Better (song) =

2017 single by Sandro Cavazza

- Lost Frequencies remix digital cover

Single by Sandro Cavazza

from the EP Sandro Cavazza
- Released: 19 May 2017
- Genre: Pop
- Length: 3:01
- Label: Ineffable Music, Universal Music
- Songwriters: Carl Silvergran; Felix Flygare Floderer; Tim Bergling; Sandro Cavazza
- Producers: Dhani Lennevald; Humble & Blisse; Sebastian Furrer

Sandro Cavazza singles chronology
"Don't Hold Me" (2017)	"So Much Better" (2017)	"Without You" (2017)

Music video
- "Sandro Cavazza - So Much Better" on YouTube

"So Much Better" is a song by Swedish singer Sandro Cavazza, available on his debut extended play Sandro Cavazza. In May 2017, a Lost Frequencies remixed version was a released as a digital single.

== Music video ==
The music video for "So Much Better" was directed by Robin Kempe-Bergman, produced by Robinovich and released on 8 June 2017.

Cavazza said, "Recording the video for "So Much Better" was the most honest and crazy creative experience of my life! I spent 24 hours filming in a row and the post-production by Robinovich is just amazing. The team has done such an great job realizing my vision of the video for this song."

== Reception ==
Steph Evans of Earmilk wrote: "Cavazza takes a darker, more forward and downtempo turn" (on "So Much Better"), showcasing his falsetto and vocal talent over more stripped down production than what we've seen from him in the past, he brings the passion and force of a real star fighting for himself."

== Track listing ==
Digital download
No.	Title	Length
1.	"So Much Better" (Lost Frequencies remix)	3:30

Digital download
No.	Title	Length
1.	"So Much Better" (SLVR remix)	2:50

== Chart performance ==
=== Weekly charts ===
Chart (2017)	Peak position
Sweden (Sverigetopplistan)	12

== Avicii Remix ==
"So Much Better"

Remix by Avicii and Sandro Cavazza

from the EP Avīci (01)
- Released: August 10, 2017
- Recorded: 2017
- Genre: EDM; Progressive House; Tropical House; Dance Pop
- Length: 2:37
- Label: Avicii, Virgin
- Songwriters: Carl Silvergran; Felix Flygare Floderer; Tim Bergling; Sandro Cavazza
- Producer: Avicii

In August 2017, an Avicii remix was included on Avicii's extended play Avīci (01) which saw the song debut on the Swedish singles chart at number 12.

== Release history ==
Region	Date	Format	Version	Label	Ref.
Worldwide	28 April 2017	Streaming; digital download	Original version	Ineffable; Universal	
Worldwide	19 May 2017	Digital download	Lost Frequencies remix	Ineffable; Universal	
Worldwide	11 August 2017	Digital download	Avicii remix	Avicii; Virgin	
Worldwide	27 October 2017	Digital download	SLVR remix	Ineffable; Universal Music	
