= MishCatt =

- Born: Michelle Marie González Telford; January 29, 1992 (age 34); San José, Costa Rica
- Origin: Costa Rica
- Genre: Pop; Electropop; Synth Pop
- Occupations: Singer, Composer, Producer
- Labels: SNAFU records, Amuse (music company)
- Website: www.mishcatt.com

MishCatt is the artistic pseudonym for Michelle Marie González Telford (born January 29, 1992), a singer-songwriter from San Jose, Costa Rica. She has previously performed and released music in the Costa Rica–based pop band Patterns, but left the band in 2014 to focus on her solo project.

She released her debut EP EP in March 2016, and it quickly became the most played Costa Rican artist in the history of Spotify, getting more than six million plays in fewer than two months. The EP was recorded in Stockholm, Sweden and is produced by Pontus Winnberg (Miike Snow, Amason). The song "Another Dimension" peaked at number 17 on the Swedish Heatseeker chart.

On December 5, 2019, Gonzalez performed live vocals for the song "Fades Away" originally recorded by Noonie Bao during Avicii Tribute Concert at Friend's Arena, Stockholm. She also released a studio recording of the performance.

In 2020 she has released two songs, 'Pavo' and 'Midnight Sun', from her upcoming EP The real Pavo, which is released by Amuse (music company). Also in 2020 she collaborated with Sofia Reyes for the song Goofy Pt.2.
