= Fade into Darkness =

Single by Avicii
- Released: 22 July 2011
- Genre: Progressive house
- Length: 3:18
- Label: LE7ELS; Geffen
- Songwriters: Tim Bergling; Arash Pournouri; Simon Jeffes; John Martin; Michel Zitron; Måns Wredenberg
- Producers: Avicii; Arash Pournouri

Avicii singles chronology
"Blessed" (2011)	"Fade into Darkness" (2011)	"Collide" (2011)

Music video
- "AVICII - FADE INTO DARKNESS [OFFICIAL VIDEO]" on YouTube

"Fade into Darkness" is a song by Swedish house producer and DJ Avicii. It features uncredited vocals from Andreas Moe. The single was released on 22 July 2011. The song incorporates elements from "Perpetuum Mobile" by Penguin Cafe Orchestra, as written by Simon Jeffes. Prior to its commercial release, the song was referred to as "Penguin", which was solely an instrumental track, unlike the following lyrical version.

== Leona Lewis controversy ==
When "Fade into Darkness" was referred to as "Penguin", the song received comparisons to Leona Lewis' 2011 song "Collide". The song ("Collide") originally credited Lewis as the only artist on the track, which prompted a lawsuit against Lewis, and her record label Syco, as Avicii claimed that they had sampled "Penguin" without his permission. According to Avicii's manager Ash Pournouri, he thought that Lewis was going to only sample the original "Perpetuum Mobile" by Penguin Cafe Orchestra. In a statement, Pournouri said "We were under the impression that they were going to sample the original. They ended up copying our version. We never allowed Syco to replay our version of the track. The original sample rights belong to Simon Jeffes (Penguin Cafe Orchestra) and approval for using that composition is not in our control." As part of the lawsuit for not receiving credit on "Collide", Avicii attempted to have the release of the song suspended until an agreement was reached.

Prior to the case reaching the high court, Lewis tweeted that Avicii was fully aware of his song being sampled on "Collide", "With regards to my song, Avicii was aware & agreeing publishing splits for himself and his manager. When Avicii sent his track out to have a song written over it I totally fell in love with this version and I think he's super talented." Syco also responded to the claim, stating that Avicii was always going to work with Lewis, and that he would be credited on the song. In response, Avicii accused Lewis and her label of lying about working together, and tweeted "Thanks for accusing me of lying and speaking on my behalf. Since we never met or even spoke, please let me and my manager know who told you that and what confirmation they gave you." Hours before both Lewis's and Avicii's record labels were supposed to appear in the high court, Syco released a statement that both record labels had reached an agreement and that Avicii would appear as a featured artist on "Collide", whilst Lewis would appear as the lead artist. Avicii and his record label were pleased with the result, with the former saying "Glad to FINALLY have resolved situation with Leona. Music is the answer ... We've finally come to an agreement with Leona on all the issues ... So happy to move on and focus on hit making ... So happy to move on with Leona and focus on having a hit together." The latter stated "Avicii is an up-and-coming talent; we think he should be given a fair crack at making this record the hit it deserves to be."

== Music video ==
The music video for "Fade into Darkness" was directed by Tobias Hansson and Karl Aulin, starring Linn Asplund and Jim Cargill. The video portrays a female assassin who fell for her target. To protect him, she left him a note that said not to look for her. But he did and when he finds her she eventually kills him.

== Track listing ==
- Digital EP
1. "Fade into Darkness" (Vocal Radio Mix) – 3:18
2. "Fade into Darkness" (Vocal Club Mix) – 6:09
3. "Fade into Darkness" (Instrumental Radio Mix) – 2:58
4. "Fade into Darkness" (Instrumental Club Mix) – 5:48

== Credits and personnel ==
- Tim Bergling – songwriter, producer
- Arash Pournouri – songwriter, producer
- Simon Jeffes – songwriter
- John Martin – songwriter
- Michel Zitron – songwriter
- Måns Wredenberg – songwriter
- Dipesh Parmar – arrangement
- Andreas Moe – lead vocals
- Richard Adlam – backing vocals
- Sam Blue – backing vocals
- Simon Chapman – backing vocals
- Hal Ritson – vocal producer, backing vocals
- Wez Clarke – mixing, additional programming

Credits adapted from liner notes.

== Charts and certifications ==
=== Weekly charts ===
Chart (2011)	Peak position
Australia (ARIA)	70
Netherlands (Dutch Top 40)	27
Poland (Dance Top 50)	19
Poland (Polish Airplay New)	2
Romania (Romanian Top 100)	81
Russia Airplay (TopHit)	13
Slovakia Airplay (ČNS IFPI)	44
Sweden (Sverigetopplistan)	4
UK Dance (Official Charts)	33
UK Indie (Official Charts)	27
UK Singles (Official Charts Company)	196

=== Year-end charts ===
Chart (2011)	Position
Russia Airplay (TopHit)	150
Sweden (Sverigetopplistan)	24
Chart (2012)	Position
Sweden (Sverigetopplistan)	85

=== Certifications ===
Region	Certification	Certified units/sales
Sweden (GLF)	5× Platinum	200,000^{‡}
^{‡} Sales+streaming figures based on certification alone.

== Release history ==
Country	Date	Format	Label
Australia	16 July 2011	Digital download	LE7ELS
Sweden	22 July 2011	Digital download	Universal Music
