= Sandro Cavazza =

Swedish songwriter and singer (born 1992)

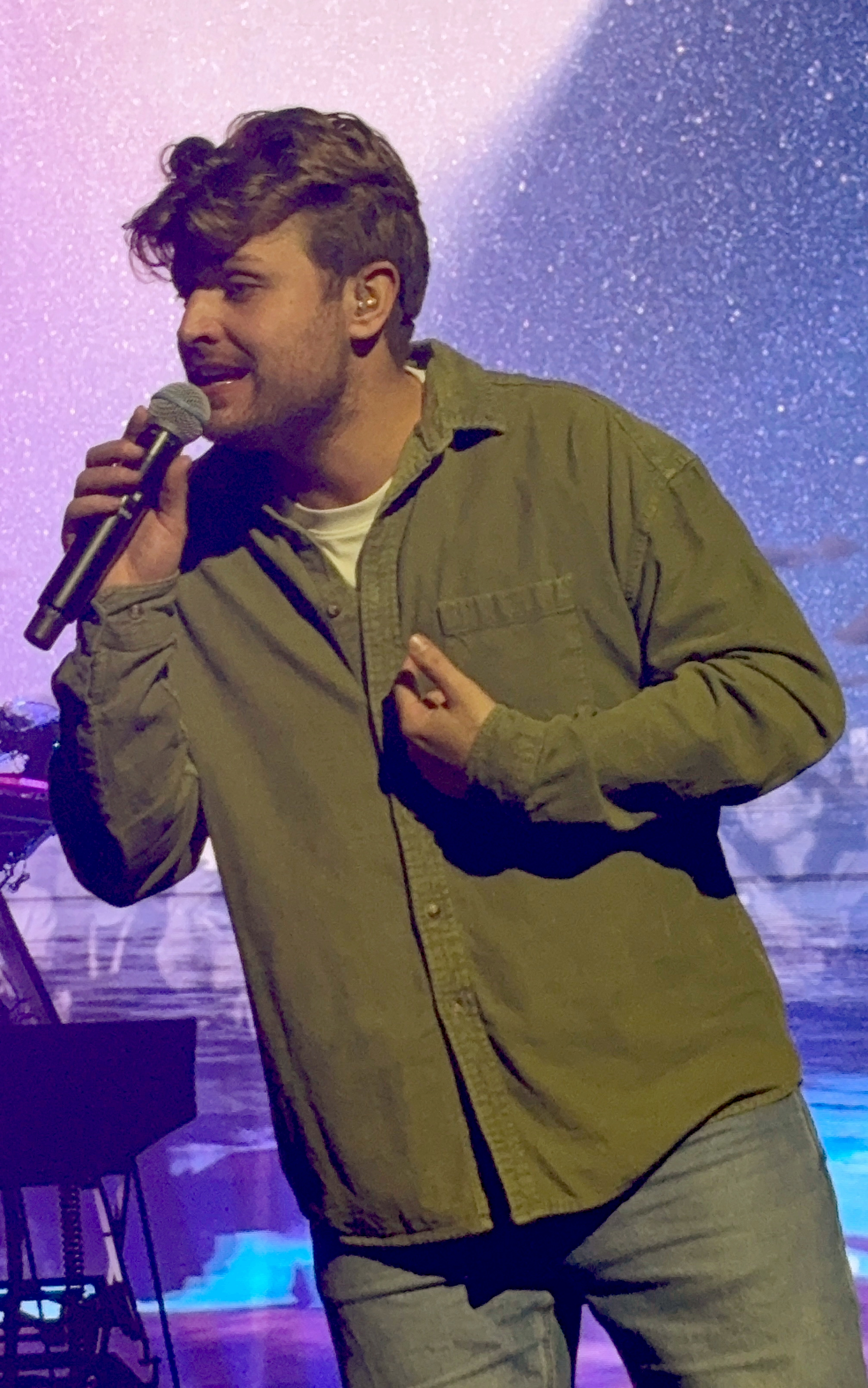
- Cavazza in 2024

Background information
- Born: Alessandro Michele Cavazza
- Origin: Stockholm, Sweden
- Genre: Pop
- Occupations: Singer; songwriter
- Years active: 2014–present

Alessandro Michele "Sandro" Cavazza (Italian pronunciation: [(ales)ˈsandro miˈkɛːle kaˈvattsa]) is a Swedish singer-songwriter of Italian origin. Besides his solo career he was also a member of the pop group Estraden.

He names his musical influences as Eagle-Eye Cherry, Nirvana, Red Hot Chili Peppers, Westlife, ABBA, Max Martin, Bon Iver and Queen, in particular Freddie Mercury.

Cavazza was a friend of the Swedish producer Avicii. They made two songs together ("Gonna Love Ya" and "Sunset Jesus") for Avicii's album Stories. Cavazza is also featured on "Without You" which was nominated for a Grammis in 2017. During a road-trip through America, Avicii and Cavazza wrote multiple songs together. After Avicii's death in 2018, only "Forever Yours" was released in 2020, after it was finished by Norwegian producer and DJ Kygo.

Despite his intention to retire as a performer after that, he has since featured on songs by other artists, including "All for Love" by Felix Jaehn (May 2023), "Fade Away" from Kygo's fifth album Kygo (June 2024) and “Young Again” by Don Diablo (September 2024)

== Personal life ==
In an interview in June 2018, Cavazza described his background as "very Swedish and part Italian", consisting of Sunday dinners with his Italian family partnered with a very secure social system in Sweden. This allowed him the opportunity to attend music school. On 23 November 2021, Cavazza announced his intention to "end his career" as an artist, claiming the reasons to be that "some things like social media, competition and being at the center of attention do not make me happy". He intended to solely focus on his career as a songwriter and held one final concert in Stockholm in 2022.

== Discography ==
=== Extended plays ===
Title	Details
Sandro Cavazza	Released: 28 April 2017; Label: Ineffable Music, Universal; Formats: Digital download
Weird & Talkative	Released: 13 November 2020; Label: Ineffable Music, Universal; Formats: Digital download, streaming

=== Singles ===
==== As lead artist ====
Title	Year	Peak chart positions								Certifications	Album
Title	Year	SWE	AUS	BEL (FL)	BEL (WA)	GER	NL	NOR	SWI	Certifications	Album
"What It Feels Like"	2017	—	—	—	—	—	—	—	—		Sandro Cavazza
"Don't Hold Me"	2017	—	—	—	—	—	—	—	—	GLF: Gold	Sandro Cavazza
"So Much Better"	2017	12	—	—	—	—	—	—	—		Sandro Cavazza
"High with Somebody" (with P3GI-13)	2018	9	—	—	—	—	—	—	—	GLF: 3× Platinum	Non-album singles
"Here"	2018	—	—	—	—	—	—	—	—		Non-album singles
"Used To" (featuring Lou Elliotte)	2018	63	—	—	—	—	—	—	—	GLF: Gold	Non-album singles
"Enemy"	2019	43	—	—	—	—	—	—	—	GLF: Platinum	Non-album singles
"Forever Yours (Avicii Tribute)" (with Avicii and Kygo)	2020	4	96	58	49	65	65	5	25		Non-album singles
"Sad Child" (with Brother Leo)	2020	—	—	—	—	—	—	—	—	GLF: Gold	Weird & Talkative
"Lean on Me"	2020	44	—	—	—	—	—	—	—	GLF: Platinum	Weird & Talkative
"Love to Lose" (with Georgia Ku)	2021	— (Note: "Love to Lose" did not enter the Swedish Singellista Chart, but peaked at number three on the Swedish Heatseeker Chart.)	—	—	—	—	—	—	—	GLF: Gold	Non-album singles
"Don't Deserve This" (with Nea)	2021	—	—	—	—	—	—	—	—		Non-album singles
"Shameless"	2021	—	—	—	—	—	—	—	—		Non-album singles
"The Days"	2022	68	—	—	—	—	—	—	—		Non-album singles
"Hold on Me" (with Kygo)	2024	49	33	—	—	—	—	25	—		TBA
"—" denotes a single that did not chart or was not released in that territory.

==== As featured artist ====
Title	Year	Peak chart positions										Certifications	Album
Title	Year	SWE	AUS	AUT	BEL (FL)	BEL (WA)	FRA	GER	NL	NOR	SWI	Certifications	Album
"Beautiful Life" (Lost Frequencies featuring Sandro Cavazza)	2016	—	—	51	1	1	39	50	65	—	—	BEA: 2× Platinum; BVMI: Gold; NVPI: Platinum; SNEP: Gold	Less Is More
"Without You" (Avicii featuring Sandro Cavazza)	2017	1	20	7	15	15	59	18	13	3	10	GLF: 7× Platinum; BEA: Platinum; BVMI: Platinum; IFPI AUT: Gold; SNEP: Platinum	Avīci (01)
"Happy Now" (Kygo featuring Sandro Cavazza)	2018	3	50	53	26	13	168	53	—	6	20	GLF: 3× Platinum; ARIA: Gold; BEA: Gold; BVMI: Gold; IFPI SWI: Gold; SNEP: Gold	Non-album single
"All for Love" (Felix Jaehn featuring Sandro Cavazza)	2023	— (Note: "All for Love" did not enter the Swedish Singellista Chart, but peaked at number six on the Swedish Heatseeker Chart.)	—	—	33	—	—	—	— (Note: "All for Love" did not enter the Dutch Single Top 100, but peaked at number one on the Dutch Single Tip chart.)	—	—		TBA
"—" denotes a single that did not chart or was not released in that territory.

=== Non-single album appearances ===
Title	Year	Peak chart positions		Certifications	Album
Title	Year	SWE	NOR	Certifications	Album
"Gonna Love Ya" (Avicii featuring Sandro Cavazza)	2015	3	25	GLF: 3× Platinum	Stories
"Sunset Jesus" (Avicii featuring Gavin DeGraw, John Dhani Lennevald, Mike Posner & Sandro Cavazza)	2015	37	—		Stories
"Beautiful" (Kygo featuring Sandro Cavazza)	2020	—	—		Golden Hour
"Fade Away" (Kygo featuring Sandro Cavazza)	2024	—	—		Kygo
"—" denotes a song that did not chart or was not released in that territory.

=== Other certified songs ===
Title	Year	Certifications	Album
"What Kind of Man"	2017	GLF: Gold	Sandro Cavazza
