= Seek Bromance =

Single by Tim Berg
- Released: 17 October 2010
- Recorded: 2010
- Genre: Progressive house
- Length: 3:22
- Label: Ministry of Sound
- Songwriters: Tim Bergling; Arash Pournouri (original instrumental); Maurizio Colella; Samuele Sartini; Maurizio Alfieri; Davide Domenella; Wendy Lewis; Andrea Tonici; Amanda Wilson; Massimiliano Moroldo (co-writers/writers of 'Seek Bromance'/'Love U Seek')
- Producers: Tim Bergling (original instrumental); Arash Pounouri (exec.); Wez Clarke (vocals); Tom Kent (Extra credits all for 'Love U Seek'/'Seek Bromance')

Avicii singles chronology
"My Feelings for You" (2010)	"Seek Bromance" (2010)	"Tweet It" (2010)

Music video
- "Tim Berg - Bromance" on YouTube

Music video
- "Tim Berg - Bromance (Aviciis Arena Mix) (Official Video HD)" on YouTube

Music video
- "Tim Berg - 'Seek Bromance' (Official Video)" on YouTube

"Seek Bromance" is the second single by Swedish producer and DJ Avicii, made while he was under the name Tim Berg. It was released on 17 October 2010 in the United Kingdom, where it charted at number 12. Earlier that year, on 14 April, Avicii released an instrumental song named "Bromance", which topped the Flemish charts, and peaked at number two in the Netherlands. "Seek Bromance" is a vocal version of this song, with the addition of re-recorded vocals from the track "Love U Seek" by Italian DJ Samuele Sartini featuring English singer Amanda Wilson, who, in the case of "Seek Bromance", is not credited as singer.

== Composition ==
"Seek Bromance" is set in common time, in the key of C♯ minor, with a tempo of 126 beats per minute.

== Track listing ==
- Dutch digital download
1. "Seek Bromance" (Avicii's Vocal Edit) – 3:23
2. "Seek Bromance" (Avicii's Vocal Extended) – 8:08
3. "Seek Bromance" (Samuele Sartini Radio Edit) – 3:13
4. "Seek Bromance" (Samuele Sartini Extended Mix) – 5:26
- UK CD single
1. "Seek Bromance" (Avicii's Vocal Edit) – 3:22
2. "Seek Bromance" (Avicii's Arena Mix) – 8:18
- UK digital download
1. "Seek Bromance" (Avicii's Vocal Edit) – 3:23
2. "Seek Bromance" (Avicii's Vocal Extended) – 8:10
3. "Bromance" (Bimbo Jones Remix) – 8:00
4. "Bromance" (Chris Reece Pinkstar Remix) – 7:04
5. "Bromance" (Avicii's Arena Mix) – 8:17
6. "Bromance" (Avicii's Arena Radio Edit) – 3:54
- Danish digital download
1. "Seek Bromance" (Avicii's Vocal Edit) – 3:23
2. "Seek Bromance" (Avicii's Vocal Extended) – 8:08
3. "Seek Bromance" (Bimbo Jones Remix) – 8:21
4. "Seek Bromance" (Samuele Sartini Extended Mix) – 5:26
5. "Seek Bromance" (Samuele Sartini Radio Edit) – 3:13
6. "Seek Bromance" (Kato Remix) – 7:40
- German digital download
1. "Seek Bromance" (Avicii's Vocal Edit) – 3:21
2. "Seek Bromance" (Avicii's Vocal Extended) – 8:08
3. "Seek Bromance" (Bimbo Jones Vocal Remix) – 8:21
4. "Seek Bromance" (Samuele Sartini Radio Edit) – 3:13
5. "Seek Bromance" (Samuele Sartini Extended Mix) – 5:26
- German CD single
1. "Seek Bromance" (Avicii's Vocal Edit) – 3:21
2. "Seek Bromance" (Avicii's Vocal Extended) – 8:09

== Personnel ==
From liner notes:

- Songwriting: Tim Bergling, Arash Pournouri, Maurizio Colella, Samuele Sartini, Maurizio Alfieri, Davide Domenella, Wendy Lewis, Andrea Tonici, Amanda Wilson, Massimiliano Moroldo
- Production: Tim Bergling
- Mixing: Tim Bergling, Arash Pournouri
- Executive producer: Arash Pournouri
- Vocal production and programming: Wez Clarke
- Additional vocal recording and production: Tom Kent

== Music video ==
The music video was filmed in California and showcases a road trip with two guys and a girl.

== Charts ==
=== Weekly charts ===
Chart (2010–11)	Peak position
Australia (ARIA)	32
Australia Dance (ARIA)	7
Austria (Ö3 Austria Top 40)	53
Belgium (Ultratop 50 Flanders)	1
Belgium (Ultratop 50 Wallonia)	4
Czech Republic Airplay (ČNS IFPI)	13
Denmark (Tracklisten)	5
Estonia (Eesti Top 40)	8
European Hot 100 Singles	65
France (SNEP)	12
Germany (GfK)	61
Hungary (Dance Top 40)	4
Hungary (Rádiós Top 40)	8
Netherlands (Dutch Top 40)	2
Netherlands (Single Top 100)	5
Norway (VG-lista)	4
Poland (Polish Airplay Top 100)	2
Poland (Polish Airplay TV)	5
Poland (Dance Top 50)	3
Romania (UPFR)	32
Russia Airplay (TopHit)	12
Scotland Singles (OCC)	13
Slovakia Airplay (ČNS IFPI)	9
Sweden (Sverigetopplistan)	20
Switzerland (Schweizer Hitparade)	13
UK Singles (OCC)	13
UK Dance (OCC)	3
UK Indie (OCC)	1
US Dance Club Songs (Billboard)	1
US Dance/Mix Show Airplay (Billboard)	4

Notes

- The version that charted in Belgium and the Netherlands was the original instrumental as opposed to the vocal edit.

=== Year-end charts ===
Chart (2010)	Position
Belgium (Ultratop 50 Flanders)	13
Belgium (Ultratop 50 Wallonia)	44
Hungary (Dance Top 40)	63
Netherlands (Dutch Top 40)	7
Netherlands (Single Top 100)	20
Sweden (Sverigetopplistan)	53
UK Singles (OCC)	190

Chart (2011)	Position
France (SNEP)	87
Hungary (Dance Top 40)	19
Hungary (Rádiós Top 40)	66
Russia Airplay (TopHit)	94
Sweden (Sverigetopplistan)	69
US Dance/Mix Show Airplay (Billboard)	10

== Certifications ==
Region	Certification	Certified units/sales
Australia (ARIA)	Gold	35,000^{^}
Belgium (BRMA)	Gold	15,000^{*}
Denmark (IFPI Danmark)	Gold	15,000^{^}
Netherlands (NVPI)	Gold	10,000^{^}
Sweden (GLF)	Platinum	40,000^{‡}
United Kingdom (BPI)	Platinum	600,000^{‡}
^{*} Sales figures based on certification alone.^{^} Shipments figures based on certification alone.^{‡} Sales+streaming figures based on certification alone.

== Release history ==
Country	Date	Format	Label
Netherlands	17 October 2010	Digital download	Zouk
United Kingdom	24 October 2010	CD; digital download	Ministry of Sound
Denmark	3 November 2010	Digital download	U&!
Germany	12 November 2010	CD; digital download	Kontor
