= Without You (Avicii song) =

Single by Avicii featuring Sandro Cavazza

from the EP Avīci (01)
- Released: 11 August 2017
- Recorded: 2016
- Genre: Progressive house; folktronica; Eurodance
- Length: 3:01
- Label: Avicii; Geffen
- Songwriters: Carl Falk; Salem Al Fakir; Tim Bergling; Vincent Pontare; Dhani Lennevald; Alessandro Cavazza
- Producers: Carl Falk; Avicii

Avicii singles chronology
"Taste the Feeling" (2016)	"Without You" (2017)	"Lonely Together" (2017)

Sandro Cavazza singles chronology
"So Much Better" (2017)	"Without You" (2017)	"High with Somebody" (2018)

Music video
- "Without You" on YouTube

"Without You" is a song by Swedish DJ Avicii, featuring vocals from Swedish singer Sandro Cavazza. The song was released on 11 August 2017 as the lead single from Avicii's EP, Avīci (01). "Without You" is Avicii's seventh Swedish number-one single, reaching number one upon release in 2017 and again after Avicii's death in April 2018.

On 13 October 2017, the official remix EP was released, featuring remixes from Otto Knows, Merk & Kremont, Rob Adans and the winners of his remix contest, Notre Dame and Tokima Tokio.

== Background and reception ==
"Without You" was the opening track in Avicii's Ultra Miami set in March 2016. The song was used frequently across the world throughout 2016. A fan made video of the song was available online from September 2016. The song was released digitally on 11 August 2017.

Jeffrey Yau of Your EDM said, "'Without You' is quintessential Avicii. Smooth, upbeat melodies marked with heavy string usage and a euphoric progressive house drop perfectly crafted for the mainstage. Simple, happy-go-lucky lyrics and chord progressions that will have you smiling from the first second to the last – this is Avicii at his finest."

== Track listing ==
Digital download – remixes

1. "Without You" (Otto Knows Remix) – 3:33
2. "Without You" (Merk & Kremont Remix) – 4:20
3. "Without You" (Notre Dame Remix) – 4:05
4. "Without You" (Tokima Tokyo Remix) – 3:11
5. "Without You" (Rob Adans Remix) – 3:04

== Charts ==
=== Weekly charts ===
Chart (2017–2018)	Peak position
Australia (ARIA)	20
Australia Dance (ARIA)	2
Austria (Ö3 Austria Top 40)	7
Belgium (Ultratop 50 Flanders)	15
Belgium Dance (Ultratop Flanders)	4
Belgium (Ultratop 50 Wallonia)	15
Belgium Dance (Ultratop Wallonia)	1
Canada Hot 100 (Billboard)	62
Czech Republic Airplay (ČNS IFPI)	1
Czech Republic Singles Digital (ČNS IFPI)	2
Denmark (Tracklisten)	11
Europe (Euro Digital Songs)	19
Finland (Suomen virallinen lista)	5
France (SNEP)	30
Germany (GfK)	18
Hungary (Dance Top 40)	9
Hungary (Rádiós Top 40)	4
Hungary (Single Top 40)	4
Hungary (Stream Top 40)	3
Ireland (IRMA)	19
Italy (FIMI)	14
Japan Hot 100 (Billboard)	50
Latvia Streaming (LaIPA)	77
Netherlands (Dutch Top 40)	5
Netherlands (Mega Top 50)	9
Netherlands (Single Top 100)	13
New Zealand Heatseekers (RMNZ)	1
Norway (VG-lista)	3
Poland Airplay (ZPAV)	7
Portugal (AFP)	37
Romania (Romanian Airplay 100)	85
Russia Airplay (Tophit)	70
Scottish Singles Sales (Official Charts)	10
Slovakia Airplay (ČNS IFPI)	8
Slovakia Singles Digital (ČNS IFPI)	5
Slovenia (SloTop50)	15
Spain (Promusicae)	41
Sweden (Sverigetopplistan)	1
Switzerland (Schweizer Hitparade)	10
UK Singles (Official Charts)	32
UK Dance (Official Charts)	8
US Bubbling Under Hot 100 (Billboard)	14
US Hot Dance/Electronic Songs (Billboard)	13

=== Year-end charts ===
Chart (2017)	Position
Austria (Ö3 Austria Top 40)	55
Belgium (Ultratop Flanders)	81
Belgium (Ultratop Wallonia)	94
Germany (Official German Charts)	90
Hungary (Rádiós Top 40)	63
Hungary (Stream Top 40)	39
Latvia Airplay (LaIPA)	31
Netherlands (Dutch Top 40)	21
Poland (ZPAV)	74
Sweden (Sverigetopplistan)	18
US Hot Dance/Electronic Songs (Billboard)	54
Chart (2018)	Position
Belgium (Ultratop Flanders)	94
Denmark (Tracklisten)	87
Hungary (Dance Top 40)	18
Hungary (Rádiós Top 40)	23
Hungary (Single Top 40)	78
Netherlands (Dutch Top 40)	91
Sweden (Sverigetopplistan)	1
US Hot Dance/Electronic Songs (Billboard)	63
Chart (2019)	Position
Hungary (Dance Top 40)	88
Sweden (Sverigetopplistan)	36

== Certifications ==
Certifications for "Without You"
Region	Certification	Certified units/sales
Austria (IFPI Austria)	Gold	15,000^{‡}
Belgium (BRMA)	Platinum	40,000^{‡}
Brazil (Pro-Música Brasil)	3× Platinum	180,000^{‡}
Canada (Music Canada)	Platinum	80,000^{‡}
Denmark (IFPI Danmark)	2× Platinum	180,000^{‡}
France (SNEP)	Diamond	333,333^{‡}
Germany (BVMI)	Platinum	400,000^{‡}
Italy (FIMI)	3× Platinum	150,000^{‡}
New Zealand (RMNZ)	2× Platinum	60,000^{‡}
Poland (ZPAV)	2× Platinum	100,000^{‡}
Portugal (AFP)	Platinum	10,000^{‡}
Spain (Promusicae)	Platinum	60,000^{‡}
United Kingdom (BPI)	Platinum	600,000^{‡}
United States (RIAA)	Gold	500,000^{‡}
Streaming
Japan (RIAJ)	Gold	50,000,000^{†}
Sweden (GLF)	7× Platinum	56,000,000^{†}
^{‡} Sales+streaming figures based on certification alone.^{†} Streaming-only figures based on certification alone.

== See also ==
- List of number-one singles of the 2010s (Sweden)
