= Dhani Lennevald =

Swedish Pop/R&B dancer and singer (born 1984)

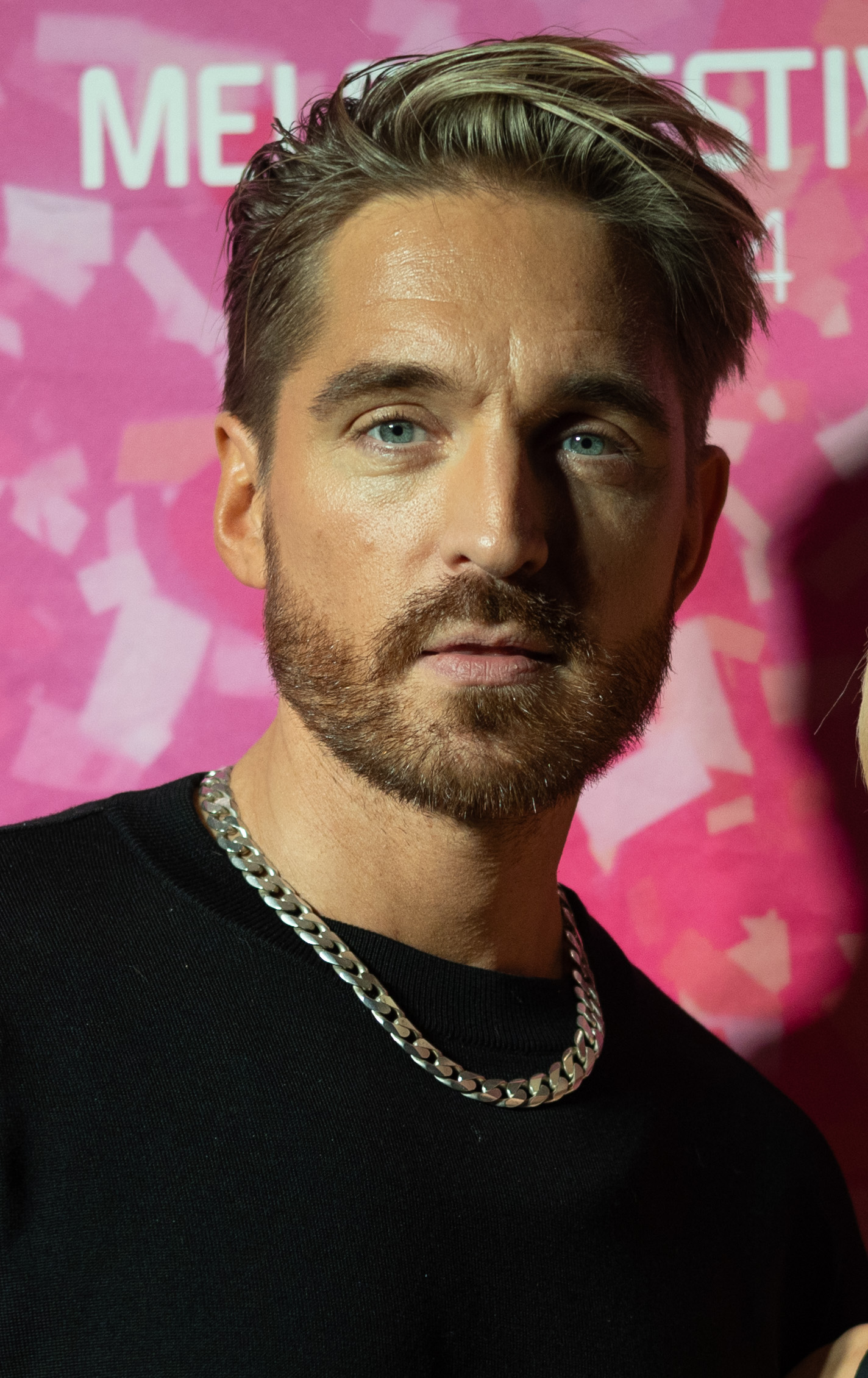
- Lennevald in 2024

Background information
- Born: 24 July 1984 (age 42); Stockholm, Sweden
- Genres: Pop; R&B
- Occupations: Singer; songwriter
- Instrument: Vocals
- Years active: 1998–present (A-Teens); 2004–present (solo artist); 2005–present (producer)
- Label: Universal Records (2004–2005)
- Member of: A-Teens
- Website: DhaniMusic.com

John Dhani Lennevald (born 24 July 1984) is a Swedish singer and songwriter. He is a member of the Swedish pop band A*Teens, and briefly pursued a solo recording career after the band was dissolved.

== Career ==
=== A-Teens (1998–2004) ===
In 1998, at the age of 14, Lennevald signed a record deal with Stockholm Records (part of Universal Music Group) along with his band mates then, who performed together as the A-Teens. In 1999, they released their first single, a cover of Mamma Mia of the famous band ABBA. The single topped the charts in Sweden for eight consecutive weeks and was successful in other countries.

By 2000, the A-Teens' first album, The ABBA Generation had sold 4 million copies and they became one of the most successful Swedish bands around the world.

After 6 years together and more than 9 million albums sold, the A-Teens parted ways, having done their Greatest Hits album and a final tour in Sweden.

=== Solo career ===
The A-Teens having disbanded in 2004, Lennevald returned to studio to write and record new songs. Lennevald released the single "Girl Talk" on September 15, 2004; it reached No. 20 on the Swedish Charts and earned a Gold Certification.

After the release of his single, Lennevald worked as a model, appearing in several fashion magazines and participating in fashion shows in his native Sweden.

In 2005 Lennevald and Universal Music parted ways. Also in 2005, a song clip called "Let's Do It Again" leaked on the Internet and Lennevald appeared on shows in Sweden promoting his image and new songs.

Since then, Lennevald has worked as a music producer and songwriter and collaborated with Måns Zelmerlöw, Anton Ewald and Carl Falk.

== Personal life ==
In 2007, Lennevald was reported to be in a relationship with former glamour model Natacha Peyre. In 2008, the couple relocated from Stockholm to Los Angeles. Lennevald had returned to Europe by the mid-2010s, and according to Instagram postings of 2021, he began a relationship with British singer Alice Chater.

In 2023, Lennevald moved back to Los Angeles with his girlfriend.

== Discography ==
=== Extended plays ===
- 2022: Breaking Habits

=== Singles ===
- 2004: "Girl Talk"
- 2005: "Let's Do It Again"

=== Featured in ===
- 2015: "Sunset Jesus" (Avicii feat. Gavin DeGraw, John Dhani Lennevald, Mike Posner & Sandro Cavazza)
