= Ash Pournouri =

Iranian-Swedish record manager, producer, songwriter, and executive

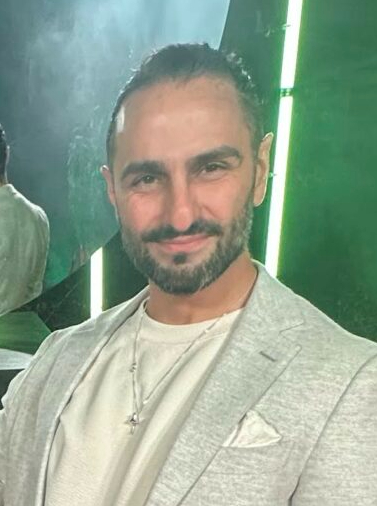
- Pournouri in 2023

Background information
- Born: Arash Andreas Pournouri; August 8, 1981 (age 45); Iran
- Origin: Stockholm, Sweden
- Occupations: record producer; music executive; songwriter; angel investor; talent manager; businessperson
- Label: PRMD Music

Arash Andreas Pournouri (born 28 August 1981) bka Ash Pournouri is an Iranian-Swedish record producer, music executive, and businessman.

== Career ==
While he is best known as the former manager for Avicii, their artist-manager relationship ended in December 2016. Pournouri is also known for co-writing the lyrics to Cazzette's song, “Beam Me Up”. He owns the music label PRMD Music and the booking agency At Night Management. He appeared in the documentary film Avicii: True Stories.

In 2014, Pournouri was awarded as MVP (Most Valuable Person) at the Denniz Pop Awards founded by Denniz Pop.

Pournouri along with Spotify founder Daniel Ek are the creators of the tech convention Symposium. He has also owned and ran several restaurant and bars in Norway and arranged club nights in Stockholm. On 9 July 2015, he was the presenter for Sommar i P1 on Sveriges Radio. In 2017, Pournouri founded Self Made International: a company that hosted a contest for "aspiring and unsigned artists to build a following by uploading performance videos onto the platform that are then voted on by the public...". The winner of the contest would land a "50-50 record deal on [PRMD Music]... and $25,000 in prize money". He is one of the founders of Brilliant Minds. In 2018, he along with Brilliant Minds arranged a conference at Grand Hotel in Stockholm where Barack Obama attended. In 2019, Pournouri became part owner of the video platform Triller.

=== Non-music industry ventures ===
Pournouri co-founded a health company called "Shewy" which provides subscribers vitamin and mineral enriched chewing gum packs. and a food company called "Oatlaws" which provides pudding containing "pea protein, cocoa and oats." In February 2021, the company received pre-seed investors such as Kelly Gale and Jonas Fagerström.

Pournouri is a judge on Idol 2024 which is broadcast on TV4.

== Personal life ==
Pournouri graduated with a Master of Laws degree from Stockholm University in 2006.
