= Joey Moe discography =

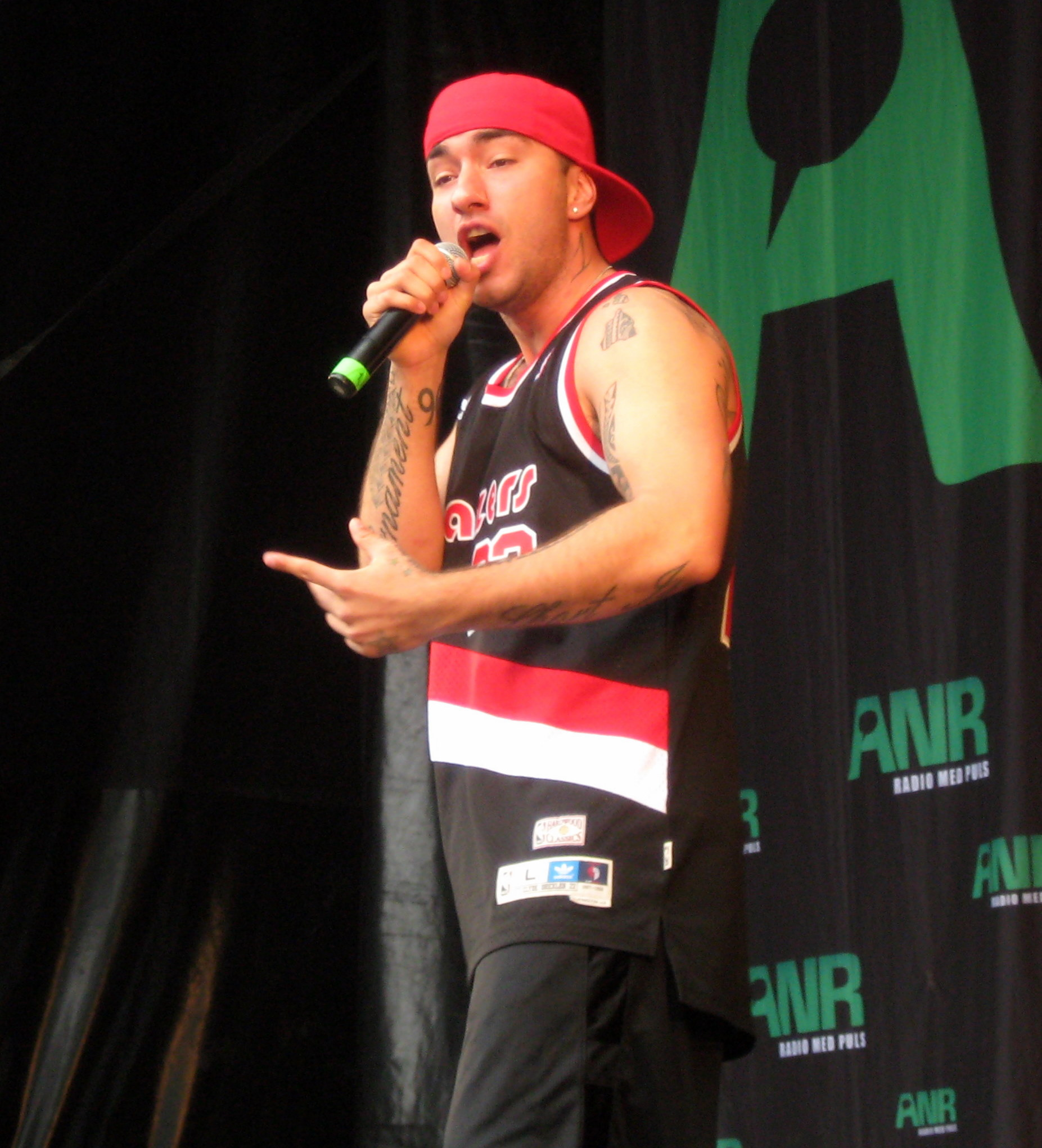
- Joey Moe in 2011
- Studio albums: 6
- Singles: 24
- Music videos: 14

== Studio albums ==
Year	Album	Peak position	Certification
Year	Album	DEN	Certification
2006	MoeTown	28	
2010	Grib natten	20	
2011	Fuldmåne	8	DEN: Platinum
2011	Fuldmåne 2.0	4	DEN: Platinum
2012	Midnat	3	
2013	Aurora	15	
2014	Joey	1	DEN: 2× Platinum
2017	Klarsyn	6	

== Singles ==
Year	Single	Peak position	Certification	Album
Year	Single	DEN	Certification	Album
2005	"Flip It (Like a DJ)"	—		MoeTown
2006	"My Last Serenade"	—		MoeTown
2006	"Miss Copenhagen"	—		MoeTown
2007	"If I Want To"	—		Rich Kids soundtrack
2008	"Lullaby"	—		non-album single
2009	"Yo-Yo"	11	Platinum (download)	Grib natten
2009	"Jorden Er Giftig"	11	Gold (download)	Grib natten
2010	"Du' En Éner"	27	Gold (download)	Grib natten
2011	"Skakmat"	8	Gold (download); Gold (streaming)	Fuldmåne
2011	"Er du derude" (feat. Nik & Jay)	17		Fuldmåne
2011	"Banger Til Min Banger" (feat. Morten Breum)	36		Fuldmåne
2011	"Dobbeltslag"	4	Gold (download); Platinum (streaming)	Fuldmåne
2011	"Inderst inde (Part 2)"	4		Fuldmåne 2.0
2011	"Gadedreng"	—	Platinum (streaming)	Fuldmåne 2.0
2011	"Venus"	7		Fuldmåne 2.0
2011	"Walk Right Back"	3		Fuldmåne 2.0
2011	"Whenever You Need Me"	12		Fuldmåne 2.0
2011	"Fra kæreste til grin"	11		Fuldmåne 2.0
2011	"Cand. Mag. Fugl Fonix"	33		Fuldmåne 2.0
2012	"Gi' Mig"	1		Midnat
2012	"9MM" (feat. Michell Berthou)	—		Midnat
2012	"Tænder En Ild" (feat. Nik & Jay)	28		Midnat
2013	"Jeg Falder For Dig"	—		Midnat
2014	"Million"	1		Joey
2014	"Hvis det ik' skal være os"	11		Joey
2014	"Klar på mig nu"	10		Joey
2016	"Smukkest på en søndag"	3		TBA
2016	"Eneste"	25		TBA
2017	"Udenpå indeni"	27		TBA
2017	"Hey Mor"	8		TBA
"—" marks releases that did not appear in official charts

=== As featured artist ===
Year	Single	Peak position	Certification	Album
Year	Single	DEN	Certification	Album
2006	"Boing" (Nik & Jay feat. Joey Moe)	—		remix promo release
2007	"Jeg Lever" (Medina feat. Joey Moe)	—		remix promo release
2009	"Sænke slagskibe" (as part of the Gaza song)	—		non-album single
2009	"Sig ja" (Jokeren featuring Joey Moe)	4	Platin (download)	Den tørstige digter
2009	"Enspænder" (Partners featuring Joey Moe, Jeppe Rapp and Zjakalen)	—		non-album single
2010	"Lighters Up" (Chriz featuring Joey Moe and Jinks)	16		non-album single
2011	"Dybt vand" (Svenstrup & Vendelboe featuring Nadia Malm and Joey Moe)	—		non-album single
2012	"2012 (Det Derfor)" (Pegboard Nerds featuring Dice & Joey Moe)	—		non-album single
2012	"Stjernetegn" (Pete Fox featuring Joey Moe & Jeanette Zeniia)	25		non-album single
"—" marks single that has not featured in official charts.
