= Jules Wolfson =

Danish record producer and songwriter

- Occupations: Record producer; songwriter; Record executive
- Years active: 2001-present
- Musical career
- Genres: Pop; R&B; rap
- Labels: Nexus Music; Universal Music; Copenhagen Records; Warner Music; EMI Music
- Website: juleswolfson.com

Johannes Jules Wolfson, better known as Jules Wolfson or as part of the production team Jon & Jules, is a Danish producer, songwriter, and record executive.

For his work as a producer and songwriter, Wolfson has been awarded gold and platinum record certifications more than 150 times and his releases have resulted in 7 Danish Music Awards, 5 Danish DeeJay Awards, and numerous nominations.

Wolfson has been one of the most played musicians on Danish radio for several years in a row.

== Career ==
Jules Wolfson signed, developed and produced Nik & Jay, the best-selling Danish-language music group ever, with sales of over one million albums and recipient of numerous awards and nominations at, among others, the Danish Music Awards. In 2011, together with Nik & Jay, Wolfson received the IFPI's Danish Music Awards Prize of Honor.

Wolfson signed, developed and produced Joey Moe, which among other things resulted in the Danish club hit, "Yo-Yo".

Wolfson signed, developed and produced Cisilia, who at the Danish Music Awards 2015 became the youngest winner ever (at the age of 16), when she won in the categories Danish Hit of the Year and New Artist of the Year.

On 15 November 2015, Wolfson received awards from the songwriting and composer association Danske Populær Autorer (DPA) for, among other things, writing and producing "Hit of the Year".

Wolfson has written songs and produced music with international artists such as J. Holiday, Massari, Usher, Ne-Yo, R. City, Emilia, and Timbaland, which has resulted in positions on the US Billboard 200 chart.

Wolfson has also signed, developed and produced the platinum-selling artists Alex, Ankerstjerne, and Sisse Marie. His work with Sisse Marie was distinguished by reaching number 1 on the Danish sales chart and by being the 8th most watched music video in the world on YouTube on the day of release.

Wolfson has also written and produced platinum awarded songs with artists such as Burhan G, Clemens, Christian Brøns, Blå Øjne and Morten Breum.
