= Midnat =

Studio album by Joey Moe
- Released: 1 October 2012
- Recorded: 2012; Sony Music (Copenhagen)
- Genre: Pop
- Length: 1:21:58
- Labels: disco:wax, Sony Music
- Producers: Joey Moe, Pete Fox, Kay & Ndrustry

Joey Moe chronology
Fuldmåne 2.0 (2011)	Midnat (2012)

Singles from Midnat
- 1. "2012 (Det Derfor) (Pegboard Nerds feat. Joey Moe)" Released: 5 March 2012; 2. "Stjernetegn Pete Fox (feat. Joey Moe & Jeanette Zeniia)" Released: 12 March 2012; 3. "Gi' Mig" Released: 2 July 2012; 4. "9MM (feat. Mitchell Berthou)" Released: 15 November 2012; 5. "Tænder En Ild (feat. Nik & Jay)" Released: 24 December 2012

Midnat (lit. 'Midnight') is the fourth studio album by the Danish singer Joey Moe, which was produced by disco:wax and distributed by Sony Music. Perportedly, it is his final album in Danish. It was released on 1 October 2012 exactly at midnight.

Midnat consists of CDs with the titles AM and PM. The former CD consists of tracks fitting into the genre of pop; whereas the latter includes a more experimental sound.

The album peaked at #3 in Denmark, after spending 16 weeks in the charts.

== Track listing ==
=== Disc 1 ===
No.	Title	Producer	Length
1.	"Midnat (Ante Meridiem)"	13Beats	1:15
2.	"Gi' Mig"	Joey Moe, Pete Fox, Nexus Music	3:25
3.	"Tænder En Ild" (featuring Nik & Jay)	Nexus Music	3:37
4.	"Aldrig At Vågne Op"	Kay & Ndustry, Pete Fox, Joey Moe	3:22
5.	"Usynlig" (featuring Mitchell Berthou)	Nexus Music	3:36
6.	"Jeg Tager Det Hele Med"	Kay & Ndustry	3:28
7.	"Jeg Falder For Dig"	Kay & Ndustry	3:13
8.	"Faldskærm"	Puma	4:01
9.	"9MM" (featuring Mitchell Bertou)	13Beats	3:02
10.	"Atmosfære"	Kay & Ndustry	3:30
11.	"Alletider"	Puma	3:01
12.	"Natteblind" (featuring Rasmus Thude)	Kay & Ndustry	3:07
Total length:			35:17

=== Disc 2 ===
No.	Title	Producer	Length
1.	"Midnat (Post Meridiem)"	Alexander Odden	1:23
2.	"2012 (Det Derfor)" (Pegboard Nerds featuring Joey Moe)	Pegboard Nerds	5:02
3.	"Det Flyvende Tæppe" (featuring Mitchell Berthou, Jeffrey, Khani & V)	Joey Moe	3:58
4.	"Øst For København" (featuring Kaliber)	Face It	3:49
5.	"Strobelys"	Svenstrup & Vendelboe	3:26
6.	"Stjernetegn" (Pete Fox featuring Joey Moe & Jeanette Zeniia)	Pete Fox	3:46
7.	"Tinsoldat (Part 1)" (featuring Peter Pilgaard)	13Beats, Puma	5:29
8.	"Vinderholdet" (featuring Johnson)	Puma	6:06
9.	"Mangler Dig Her" (featuring Clemens)	Faustix	3:36
10.	"Tinsoldat (Part 2)" (featuring Kaliber)	Face It	3:43
11.	"Lyskryds" (featuring Jokeren)	Pitchshifters	3:22
12.	"Alt Eller Ingenting" (featuring Jeanette Zeniia & Sune Starfeldt)	Pete Fox, Joey Moe, Sune Starfeldt	3:01
Total length:			46:41
