= Yoyo (disambiguation) =

Yoyo or YOYO may refer to:

== Arts, entertainment, and media ==
=== Characters ===
- Yoyo, a green rabbit from Hallmark Media's Hoops & Yoyo
- Yoyo the Dodo, a character in the 1938 animated short film Porky in Wackyland
- Yoyo, a character from Simsala Grimm
- Si Yoyo, a 2003 Indonesian soap opera with starring by Teuku Ryan
- Yoyo, a fictional character in the video game Bahamut Lagoon

=== Entertainment ===
- Yo-yo, a toy

=== Music ===
- "YoYo" (song), a 2014 song by Nikki Ambers
- Yoyo A Go Go, a rock music festival in Olympia, Washington, United States

== Television channels ==
- Rai Yoyo, an Italian television channel

== Biology ==
- Yoyo loach, a freshwater fish

== Businesses and organizations ==
- YoYo Games, a British software development company
- Yoyodyne, various fictional aerospace companies (first appeared in Thomas Pynchon's novel V.)

== People ==
- Yoyo Chen (born 1981), Hong Kong artist
- Yoyo Díaz (1909–1989), Cuban baseball player
- Yoyo Mung (born 1973), Hong Kong artist
- Yohannes "Yoyo" Bahçecioğlu (born 1988), German-Turkish former football player
- Yo-Yo (rapper)

== Animals ==
- Yoyo (elephant), African elephant known as the world's longest-living captive African elephant (died at approximately 54 years of age)

== Other uses ==
- YOYO economics ("You're on Your Own" economics), a type of economic policy

== See also ==
- Yo-yo (disambiguation)
- Yo (disambiguation)
- Jojo (disambiguation)
