= Future rave =

Subgenre of EDM created by David Guetta and Morten Breum

- Stylistic origins: Big room house, trance, techno, tech trance, tech house, progressive house
- Cultural origins: Late 2010s

Future rave is a genre of EDM coined by disk jockey/producers David Guetta and Morten Breum. The sound is noted as a combination of techno and progressive house. In 2022, the pair went on a tour under the name Future Rave. The style was popularized by other EDM artists such as Hardwell.

== History ==
In 2019, French producer David Guetta and Danish producer Morten Breum paired together to produce some tracks, the style of which they would later call Future Rave. The first two tracks produced in this style by the pair were "Never Be Alone" with Aloe Blacc and an official remix of Avicii's "Heaven." In 2022, the pair went on a US Tour under the title Future Rave, including an appearance at EDC, and started a residency at Hï Ibiza under the same title.

In 2022, after a 4-year hiatus, Hardwell came back to play the Ultra Music Festival and his set was described as Future Rave and Future Techno. He released the track Black Magic which has been described as "synth-packed, captivating track that immerses its listeners into the world of techno."

== Style and sound ==
The sound is described as futuristic techno with trance arrangements layered in. According to Magnetic Mag, "what sets future rave apart is a slight shift in syncopation, which makes all the difference. There is an added level of syncopation to the percussions which creates a slightly more mature and rolling groove, which is interlaced with the same aggressively-programmed synth hits that propel the tracks forward. The sound pallets haven't changed, but the timings and grooves have over corrected themselves back to the early rave days of the 90s."

The tracks also contain rolling, energetic grooves with long build ups and drops, euphoric vocals and anthemic breakdowns.

== Examples ==
An example of future rave (Jake Ryan & DSalva - Revival)

- Dreams – David Guetta, MORTEN feat Lanie Gardner
- Never Be Alone – David Guetta, MORTEN feat Aloe Blacc
- Kill Me Slow – David Guetta & MORTEN
- Permanence – David Guetta & MORTEN
- You Can't Change Me – David Guetta & MORTEN feat Raye
- Element – David Guetta & MORTEN
- Love Tonight (David Guetta Remix) - Shouse
- Black Magic – Hardwell
- Let's Rave, Make Love - Armin van Buuren and Shapov
- Meant to Be (Rave Edit) – JUSTUS
- Weight of the World (Club Mix) – Armin van Buuren featuring RBVLN

== Artists ==
- David Guetta
- Gabry Ponte
- Hardwell
- MORTEN
