= Yo-yo (disambiguation) =

A yo-yo is a toy.

Yo-yo may also refer to:

== People ==
- Yo-Yo (rapper) (born 1971), American hip hop artist
- Yo-Yo Davalillo (1931–2013), Venezuelan Major League Baseball player
- Yo Yo Honey Singh (born 1983), Indian rapper, singer and musician
- Yo-Yo Ma (born 1955), Chinese-American cellist

== Art, entertainment, and media ==
=== Music ===
- The Yo-Yos, a British rock band
- Yo-Yo (album), a 1996 album by The Choirboys

==== Songs ====
- "Yo-Yo" (Billy Joe Royal song), a 1966 pop song, also covered by The Osmonds
- "Yo-Yo" (Joey Moe song), a 2009 pop song
- "Yo-Yo" (Nicola Roberts song), a 2012 electropop song
- "Yo-Yo", a 1999 song by Basement Jaxx from Remedy
- "Yo-Yo", a 1981 rock song by The Kinks from Give the People What They Want
- "Yo-Yo", a 2001 dance-pop song by Mandy Moore from Mandy Moore

=== Other ===
- Yo-Yo (comics), a fictional character
- Yo Yo or Yoyo, a 1965 film by Pierre Étaix
- Super Yo-Yo, a manga and anime series

== Science and technology ==
=== Air and space ===
- Aero Eli Serviza Yo-Yo 222, an Italian helicopter
- Yo-yo de-spin, a technique for slowing the spin of rockets
- Yo-Yo, a type of aircraft maneuver

=== Other ===
- Yo-Yo (ride) or swing ride, a type of amusement park ride
- Yo-yo dieting, a phrase describing weight fluctuations experienced by dieters
- Yo-yo problem, an antipattern encountered in software development

== Other uses ==
- Yo-yo (algorithm), a distributed algorithm
- Yo-yo club, in association football, a frequently relegated and promoted club
- Yo-yo Tsuri, a type of Japanese water balloon
- Yo-Yo, a sweet biscuit made in Australia by Arnott's Biscuits
- Yo-yo, a Venezuelan food made with cooking bananas

== See also ==
- Yoyo (disambiguation)
- Jojo (disambiguation)
- Yo (disambiguation)
