= Nik & Jay (album) =

Studio album by Nik & Jay
- Released: 24 March 2003
- Recorded: 2002
- Genre: Danish pop
- Length: 40:52
- Label: Nexus Music; EMI; Medley Records
- Producer: Jon & Jules

Nik & Jay chronology
Nik & Jay (2003)	2 (2004)

Nik & Jay is the self-titled, first studio album by the Danish pop duo Nik & Jay.

== Track listing ==
1. "Det vi gør" - 2:30
2. "Hot!" – 3:12
3. "Elsker hende mere" – 3:44
4. "Ryst din røv" – 3:21
5. "Nik & Jay" – 3:42
6. "Tch-Tching" – 4:04
7. "Tag mig tilbage" – 4:52
8. "Gå for det" – 3:07
9. "Lær mig at elske dig" – 4:49
10. "Freaky" – 3:39
11. "Pige (er du fri i nat?)" – 3:47

== Charts ==
The album reached No. 2 in the Danish Albums Chart.

== Certifications ==
Certifications for Nik & Jay
Region	Certification	Certified units/sales
Denmark (IFPI Danmark)	8× Platinum	160,000^{‡}
^{‡} Sales+streaming figures based on certification alone.

== Singles ==
Four singles were released from the album: "Nik & Jay" was the debut single and reached No. 3 in the Danish Singles Chart in 2002. This was followed by "Hot" also in 2002, "Elsker hende mere" and "Ta' mig tilbage", each released in 2003.
