= 3: Fresh, Fri, Fly =

Studio album by Nik & Jay
- Released: 25 September 2006
- Genre: Danish hip hop, pop
- Label: Nexus Music
- Producer: Nik & Jay; Jon & Jules

Nik & Jay chronology
2 (2004)	3: Fresh, Fri, Fly (2006)	De Største (2008)

3: Fresh, Fri, Fly is the third studio album by the Danish pop duo Nik & Jay.

== Track listing ==
1. "Alt Hvad Du Gør Mig Til"
2. "Boing!"
3. "Når Et Lys Slukkes"
4. "I Love Ya"
5. "Nu Er Det For Sent"
6. "Fresh, Fri, Fly"
7. "Årstiderne Skifter"
8. "Op På Hesten"
9. "Et Sidste Kys"
10. "Gi'r Dig Mer'"
11. "Vidne Til Det Hele"

== Charts ==
The album reached #2 in the Danish Albums Chart.

== Certifications ==
Certifications for 3: Fresh, Fri, Fly
Region	Certification	Certified units/sales
Denmark (IFPI Danmark)	7× Platinum	140,000^{‡}
^{‡} Sales+streaming figures based on certification alone.

== Singles ==
Five singles were released from the album: "Boing!", "Når et lys slukkes" and "I Love Ya" in 2006 and "Et sidste kys" and "Op på hesten" in 2007. "Boing!" and "Et sidste kys" both made to #2 in the Danish Singles Chart and "Når et lys slukkes" made it to #4.
