= Yo-Yo (Joey Moe song) =

2009 single by Joey Moe

Single by Joey Moe

from the album Grib Natten
- Released: March 18, 2009
- Recorded: 2009
- Genre: Pop
- Length: 3:40
- Label: Nexus Music
- Songwriters: Joey Moe, Nik & Jay, Puma

Joey Moe singles chronology
"Lullaby" (2008)	"Yo-Yo" (2009)	"Jorden Er Giftig" (2009)

"Yo-Yo" is a song recorded by the Danish singer Joey Moe. This song was the break-through song for Joey, and after just a few weeks it was the most downloaded song on iTunes. It is the most played song in Danish clubs and the longest reigning number one on the Danish dance chart.
