= Make It to Heaven =

Single by David Guetta, Morten and Raye
- Released: 22 November 2019
- Recorded: 2019
- Length: 2:52
- Label: What a Music
- Composers: David Guetta; Mike Hawkins; Morten Breum; Rachel Keen; Toby Green
- Lyricist: Rachel Keen
- Producers: David Guetta; Mike Hawkins; Morten; Toby Green

David Guetta singles chronology
| "Jump" (2019) | "Make It to Heaven" (2019) | "Conversations in the Dark" (2020) |

Morten singles chronology
| "Magnolia" (2019) | "Make It to Heaven" (2019) | "Polar" (2020) |

Raye singles chronology
| "Love Me Again" (2019) | "Make It to Heaven" (2019) | "Tequila" (2020) |

Lyric video
- "Make It to Heaven" on YouTube

"Make It to Heaven" is a song by French DJ David Guetta, Danish DJ and producer Morten and British singer-songwriter Raye. It was released as a single on 22 November 2019 by What a Music.

== Track listing ==
Digital download
| No. | Title | Length |
|---|---|---|
| 1. | "Make It To Heaven" (with Raye) | 2:52 |

Digital download
| No. | Title | Length |
|---|---|---|
| 1. | "Make It To Heaven" (with Raye) (Rework) | 2:46 |

== Personnel ==
Credits adapted from Tidal.

- David Guetta – producer, composer, writer
- Mike Hawkins – producer, composer, masterer, mixer, writer
- Morten Breum – producer, composer, DJ, writer
- Toby Green – producer, composer, masterer, mixer, writer
- Rachel Keen – composer, writer
- Raye – additional producer, featured artist
- Jenna Felsenthal – vocal engineer

== Charts ==
| Chart (2019) | Peak position |
|---|---|
| Belgium (Ultratip Bubbling Under Flanders) | 29 |
| Belgium (Ultratip Bubbling Under Wallonia) | 25 |
