= 2 (Nik & Jay album) =

Studio album by Nik & Jay
- Released: 26 April 2004
- Genres: Danish hip hop, pop
- Length: 43:32
- Labels: Nexus Music, Medley
- Producers: Nik & Jay; Jon & Jules

Nik & Jay chronology
Nik & Jay (2002)	2 (2004)	3: Fresh, Fri, Fly (2006)

2 is the second studio album by Danish Pop duo Nik & Jay.

== Track listing ==
No.	Title	Length
1.	"Pop-Pop!"	3:16
2.	"En Dag Tilbage"	4:26
3.	"Baby"	3:29
4.	"Lækker"	3:24
5.	"Når Du Græder"	4:05
6.	"Rock 'N' Roll"	3:38
7.	"Jeg Drømte"	4:10
8.	"Ryst Din Røv (Part 2)"	3:29
9.	"Cruise"	3:46
10.	"Strip"	3:44
11.	"Kan Du Høre Hende Synge"	6:05

== Commercial reception ==
The album topped the Danish Albums Chart in the first week of 2005 and stayed in the charts for a total of 71 weeks. Five singles were released from the album: "Pop-pop!", "En dag tilbage", "Lækker" "Kan du høre hende synge" and "Strip".

== Certifications ==
Certifications for 2
Region	Certification	Certified units/sales
Denmark (IFPI Danmark)	8× Platinum	160,000^{‡}
^{‡} Sales+streaming figures based on certification alone.
