= Yo =

Yo may refer to:

== Arts and entertainment ==
=== Music ===
- Yö, a Finnish rock band
- "Yo (Excuse Me Miss)", a song by Chris Brown
- Yo! MTV Raps, a television show featuring rap music, later renamed as Yo!
- "YO", an instrumental song by Linkin Park from LP Underground 11
- "Yo", a song by Armando Manzanero from the album A Mi Amor Con Mi Amor (1967)
- "Yo", a song by Squarepusher from the album Selection Sixteen (1999)
- Yo (Inna album)
- Yo (Christian Alicea album), 2023
- Yo, an album by Alex Greenwald

=== Other media ===
- Yo (film), a 2015 Mexican film
- Master Yo, a fictional character from the Disney/Jetix show Yin Yang Yo!

== Language ==
- Yo (greeting), an interjection meaning "hello" or "hey"
- Yo (Cyrillic) (Ё, ё), a letter of the Russian and other Cyrillic alphabets
- Yo (kana), the romanisation of the Japanese kana よ and ヨ
- The Spanish first person nominative pronoun (translates as I or me)
- ISO 639-1 code for the Yoruba language, a dialect continuum of western Africa

== Other uses ==
- Yō, a Japanese given name
- A US Navy hull classification symbol: Fuel oil barge, self propelled (YO)
- Yo (app), a social application
- YO! Sushi, a chain of sushi restaurants
- Special Region of Yogyakarta, Indonesia (ISO 3166-2 code ID-YO)
- YO postcode area, England
- Yo-leven, a roll of 11 in the game of craps
- Y^{O}, a strain of potato virus Y
- Yttrium(II) oxide, YO, a dark brown chemical compound
- "years old", an informal abbreviation for a person's age

== See also ==
- Yoism, an open source religion
- Yo-yo (disambiguation)
- Whyo, a member of the Whyos, New York City's dominant street gang during the mid-late 19th century
