= Klarup =

- Town
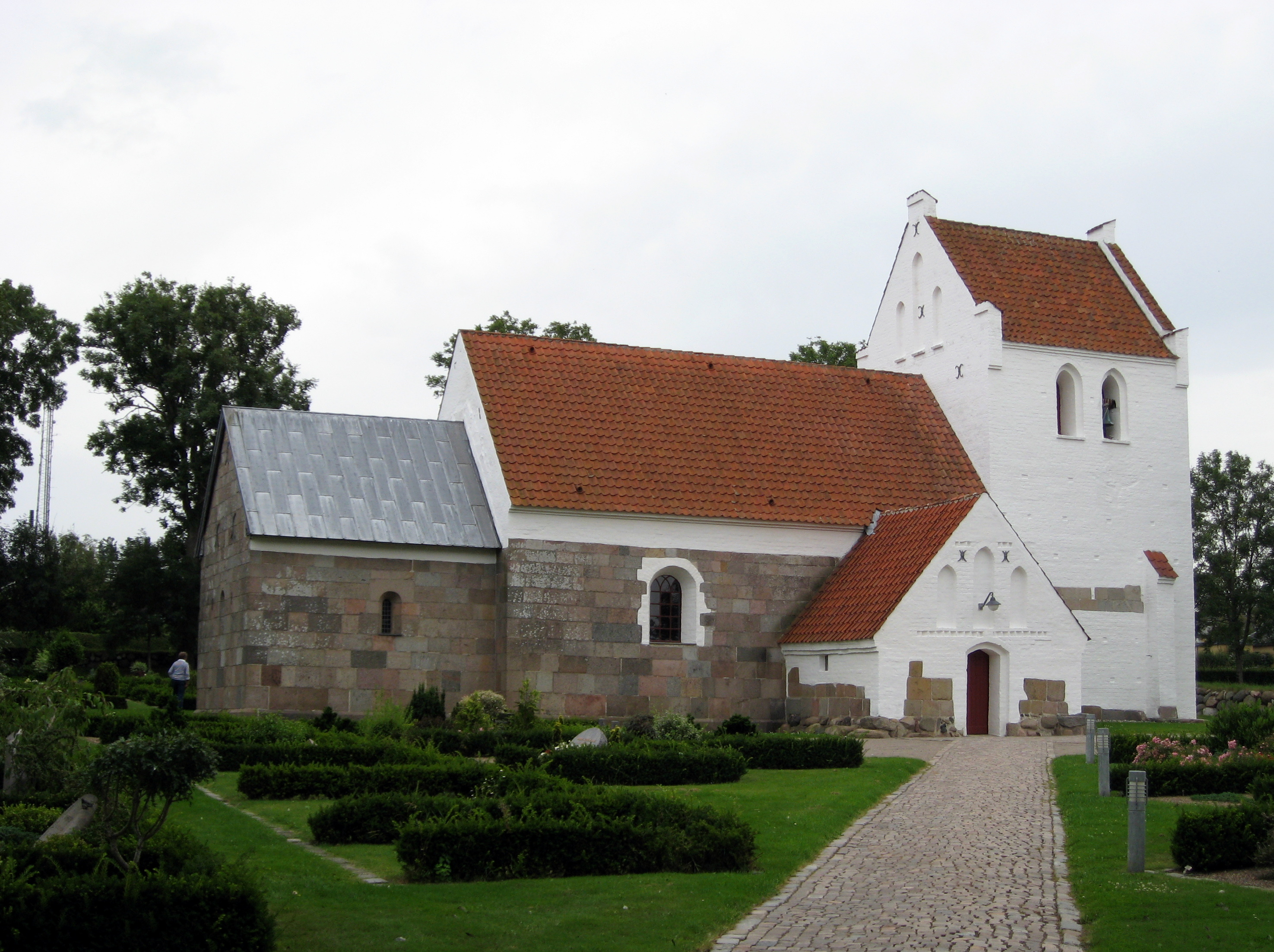
- Klarup Church

- Location in Denmark Klarup (North Jutland Region)
- Coordinates: 57°0′45″N 10°3′35″E
- Country: Denmark
- Region: North Jutland Region
- Municipality: Aalborg Municipality

Area
  - Urban: 2.7 km^{2} (1.0 sq mi)

Population (2026)
  - Urban: 5,745
  - Urban density: 2,100/km^{2} (5,500/sq mi)
  - Gender: 2,822 males and 2,923 females
- Time zone: UTC+1 (CET)
  - Summer (DST): UTC+2 (CEST)
- Postal code: DK-9270 Klarup

Klarup is a town in Denmark. Located some 11 km (6.8 mi) east of Aalborg's city centre, it belongs to the Municipality of Aalborg in the North Jutland Region. Klarup has a population of 5,745 (1 January 2026).

== Notable people ==
- Sisse Marie (born 1985 in Klarup) a Danish singer, model, TV hostess and songwriter
- Frederik Børsting (born 1995 in Klarup) a Danish football player who plays for AaB
