= Jump (David Guetta and Glowinthedark song) =

Single by David Guetta and Glowinthedark
- Released: 11 August 2019
- Length: 3:34
- Label: What a Music; Parlophone
- Songwriters: Albert Harvey; David Guetta; Theron Thomas
- Producers: David Guetta; Albert Harvey

David Guetta singles chronology
| "Never Be Alone" (2019) | "Jump" (2019) | "Make It to Heaven" (2019) |

Glowinthedark singles chronology
| "Acelera" (2019) | "Jump" (2019) |

"Jump" is a song recorded by French DJ and record producer David Guetta and Dutch DJ and record producer duo Glowinthedark. It was released on 11 August 2019 (Note: According to the video on YouTube, posted on 11 August 2019.) for free downloading, then on 3 October 2019, through What a Music and Parlophone. The song was composed by Theron Thomas from American duo R. City, David Guetta and Albert Harvey from the Dutch duo. These last two artists also produced the track.

== Background ==
David Guetta and Glowinthedark already worked together, like on their collaboration for the song "Clap Your Hands", which was a part of David Guetta's 2014 album Listen, and on a remix of Fat Joe and Remy Ma song "All The Way Up" in 2016. Guetta also signed Glowinthedark song "Ain't a Party" in 2013, to his Jack Back Records label. The Dutch duo also worked with Guetta himself on his albums and remixed some David Guetta songs, such as "Hey Mama", "Mad Love", "2U" and "Dirty Sexy Money". "Jump" marks their third collaboration.

They then played the song in several other festivals, such as Tomorrowland or Barcelona Beach Festival. Before it was officially released, the song was first enjoyed by some people who were lucky to get free downloads for a limited time. Indeed, it was initially a limited free download for fans, in August 2019, before it was released as a single on digital download and streaming platforms on 3 October 2019.

== Critical reception ==
EDM.com staff noted the presence of "energetic vocals [which] set the energy level of the track early on, with rumbling bass kicks sounding out underneath". They remarked that the song has "elements of South American and Middle Eastern effectively, marrying the two influences to yield a cohesive whole", meaning according to them that the three artists "clearly recognize how diverse the crowd is that gathers at the foot of the main stage". In the same way, Katie Bain from Billboard remarked that the single is endowed "with a Caribbean twist". Writing for Dancing Astronaut, Farrell Sweeney wrote that it "incites what the title promises with its high energy mixed with commanding undertones". Endowed with "a Caribbean-infused drop" built by "framed frantic vocals with high-pitched accents", he deemed the song "a perfect addition to a festival or a club set [which] is sure to keep the listeners dancing".

== Release history ==
| Region | Date | Format | Label |
|---|---|---|---|
| France | 11 August 2019 | Free download | What a Music; Parlophone |
| France | 3 October 2019 | Digital download; streaming | What a Music; Parlophone |
