= Yo Deluxe =

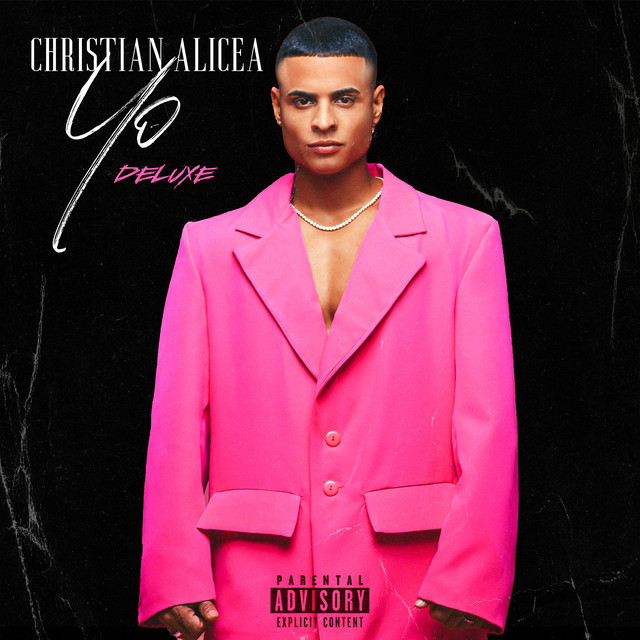

Studio album by Christian Alicea
- Released: March 15, 2024
- Genre: Salsa; Merengue; Bachata
- Length: 33:36
- Label: Therapist Music
- Producer: Urales "Dj Buddha" Vargas; Eliot "El Mago D Oz" Feliciano; Christian Alicea

Christian Alicea chronology
Yo (2023)	Yo Deluxe (2024)	Swingkete Vol. 1 – Maratón (2025)

Singles from Yo Deluxe
- 1. "El Swing 2.0" Released: February 14, 2024; 2. "Es Un Secreto" Released: March 14, 2024; 3. "Voy A Beber" Released: October 18, 2024

Yo Deluxe is the second studio album by Puerto Rican recording artist Christian Alicea, released on March 14, 2024. The album was described by ¡Hola! magazine as a "celebration of the rebirth of Tropical music".

The album was nominated for Best Salsa Album at the 2024 Latin Grammy awards. During the ceremony, Alicea shared the stage with Marc Anthony, Tito Nieves, Grupo Niche, La India, Oscar D’León, Sergio George and Luis Figueroa to pay tribute to the salsa genre.

In 2025, the album also received nominations for Tropical Album of the Year at the Lo Nuestro Awards, and Best Tropical Album at the Premios Juventud.

== Accolades ==
Year	Award	Category	Result	Ref.
2024	Latin Grammy	Best Salsa Album	Nominated	
2025	Premio Lo Nuestro	Tropical Album of the Year	Nominated	
2025	Premios Juventud	Best Tropical Album	Nominated	

== Track listing ==
Credits adapted from the album's liner notes.

No.	Title	Writer(s)	Producer(s)	Length
1.	"En PR"	Christian Bosque Alicea; Urales Vargas; Carlos Palacios; Eliot Feliciano; Jay Dary Castillo; Dennis Evaristo Ramos Cardona	Christian Alicea; Dramos	3:15
2.	"El Swing 2.0" (featuring Luis Figueroa, Moa Rivera & Luis Vazquez)	Luis Figueroa; Luis E Vázquez Torresola; Moa Rivera; Bosque Alicea; Vargas; Palacios; Feliciano; Castillo	Eliot El Mago D Oz; Dj Buddha	3:33
3.	"Es Un Secreto" (featuring Dj Buddha)	Egbert Enrique Rosa Cintron; Javier Valle Orlando; Edwin F Vazquez Vega; Bosque Alicea; Vargas; Palacios; Feliciano; Castillo	Eliot El Mago D Oz; Dj Buddha	3:28
4.	"Voy A Beber" (featuring Eliot El Mago D Oz)	Nick Rivera Caminero; Jairo Andres Fernandez; Omar Alejandro Gonzalez Santiago; Bosque Alicea; Feliciano; Vargas; Castillo	Eliot El Mago D Oz; Dj Buddha	3:37
5.	"Me Enteré"	Bosque Alicea; Vargas; Palacios; Feliciano; Castillo; Ramos Cardona	Eliot El Mago D Oz; Dj Buddha	3:15
6.	"Me Quiere 2.0" (featuring Red Rat)	Richard Martin; Wallace Wilson; Pascalle Dillett; Bosque Alicea; Vargas; Palacios; Ramirez; Feliciano; Castillo	Eliot El Mago D Oz; Dj Buddha	2:47
7.	"Bendicion" (featuring Quimico Ultra Mega & Darkiel)	Jesus Alberto Jimenez Marte; Omar David Hernandez Colon; Paris A Cabezas; Bosque Alicea; Vargas; Palacios; Ramirez; Feliciano; Castillo; Ramos Cardona	Eliot El Mago D Oz; Dj Buddha	3:35
8.	"Se Acabó 2.0"	Bosque Alicea; Vargas; Palacios; Ramirez; Feliciano; Castillo; Ramos Cardona	Eliot El Mago D Oz; Dj Buddha	3:13
9.	"Bésame 2.0"	Bosque Alicea; Vargas; Palacios; Ramirez; Feliciano; Castillo; Ethan G M Mau-Asam; Kernel Andy Shearman	Dj Buddha; Ethan Morris	3:30
10.	"Cobarde Acoustic Mix" (featuring Frankie J)	Francisco J Bautista; Bosque Alicea; Vargas; Palacios; Ramirez; Feliciano; Quiles; Ospina Garcia	Eliot El Mago D Oz; Dj Buddha	3:18
Total length:				33:36

== Credits and personnel ==
=== Performers ===
- Eliot Feliciano – Piano, Bass, coro
- Emanuel Vargas Ortíz – Bass (Track 1)
- Marcos Sánchez – Piano (Track 1)
- Christian Alicea – Congas (Track 1)
- PJ Montañez – Timbales (Track 1)
- Kevin E. Ibáñez Anés – Trumpet (Track 1)
- Jorge David Echevarria González – Trombone (Track 1)
- Emanuel Vargas Ortíz – Cuatro (Track 1,2)
- Eliezer Gonzalez - Bass (Track 2)
- Harold Correa – Trumpet (Track 2)
- Luis V. Sierra - coro (Track 2)
- Luis Carabina – Trombone (Track 2,6)
- Caliche Sabogal – Congas, Timbales (Track 2,8,9)
- Cristian Rios – Trombone (Track 3,4,7,8,9)
- Jose Feliciano – coro (Track 4)
- Pedro Serrano Rodriguez - Sax (Track 5)
- Juan Pablo Castaño – Trumpet (Track 5,7,8)
- Juan Bayer "Cosito" – Congas, Timbales (Track 6)
- Juan Esteban Duque – Electric guitar (Track 8)
- Juan Manuel Rosales – Trumpet (Track 9)
- Jaime Román – Piano (Track 10)

=== Technical ===
- Christian Alicea – executive producer
- Urales Vargas – Arranger, programming, producer, engineer, Mixer, Mastering, executive producer
- Eliot "El Mago D Oz" Feliciano – Arranger, programming, producer, engineer, Mixer, Mastering, executive producer
- Carlos Palacios – associate producer
- Jay Dary Castillo – associate producer
- iamsamsh - Art direction
- Juan Esteban Duque – Engineer
- Dennis Ramos – Engineer
