= SOS (Avicii song) =

Single by Avicii featuring Aloe Blacc

from the album Tim
- Released: 10 April 2019
- Genre: EDM
- Length: 2:37
- Label: Universal; Geffen
- Songwriters: Albin Nedler; Kristoffer Fogelmark; Tim Bergling; Tameka Cottle; Kandi Burruss; Kevin "She'kspere" Briggs
- Producers: Avicii; Nedler; Fogelmark

Avicii singles chronology
"Lonely Together" (2017)	"SOS" (2019)	"Tough Love" (2019)

Aloe Blacc singles chronology
"Brooklyn in the Summer" (2018)	"SOS" (2019)	"Never Be Alone" (2019)

Music video
- "Avicii - SOS (Fan Memories Video)" on YouTube

"SOS" is the first posthumous single by Swedish DJ Avicii, featuring co-productions from Albin Nedler and Kristoffer Fogelmark, and vocals by American singer Aloe Blacc. It was released on 10 April 2019 as the lead single of Avicii's posthumous third studio album, Tim (2019). It features an interpolation of "No Scrubs" by TLC, written by Tameka Cottle, Kandi Burruss, and Kevin "She'kspere" Briggs. It was released alongside a video featuring comments on the Avicii Memory Board, as well as a behind-the-scenes video that was released two hours prior. It debuted at number one on the singles chart in Sweden on two days of sales. The single also topped the charts in over ten countries and reached the top ten in over twenty countries.

== Background ==
The song was completed by a team of writers and producers following Avicii's death in April 2018. It was said to be "75–80% done" at the time of his death.

Co-producers Kristoffer Fogelmark and Albin Nedler confirmed that after Avicii's death, they received the MIDI file for the song that he had produced, and said that all the sounds and notes in the song were from Avicii himself without any additional production. The only additional production done on the track was for Aloe Blacc's vocals.

Though Avicii had suggested Aloe Blacc as a potential singer for the song, Blacc recorded his vocals after Avicii's death.

== Credits and personnel ==
Credits adapted from Tidal.

- Albin Nedler – songwriter, producer, vocal producer, engineer, keyboards, programming
- Kristoffer Fogelmark – songwriter, producer, vocal producer, engineer, keyboards, programming
- Avicii – songwriter, producer, keyboards, programming
- Tameka Cottle – songwriter
- Kandi Burruss – songwriter
- Kevin "She'kspere" Briggs – songwriter
- Aloe Blacc – vocals
- Marcus Thunberg Wessel – engineer
- Richard "Segal" Huredia – engineer
- Kevin Grainger – mixing and mastering

== Charts ==
=== Weekly charts ===
Weekly chart performance for "SOS"
Chart (2019)	Peak position
Australia (ARIA)	7
Australia Dance (ARIA)	1
Austria (Ö3 Austria Top 40)	4
Belgium (Ultratop 50 Flanders)	2
Belgium Dance (Ultratop Flanders)	1
Belgium (Ultratop 50 Wallonia)	7
Belgium Dance (Ultratop Wallonia)	1
Canada Hot 100 (Billboard)	13
Canada CHR/Top 40 (Billboard)	10
China Airplay/FL (Billboard)	5
Colombia (National-Report)	63
Croatia International Airplay (Top lista)	1
Czech Republic Airplay (ČNS IFPI)	1
Czech Republic Singles Digital (ČNS IFPI)	4
Denmark (Tracklisten)	4
Ecuador (National-Report)	23
Euro Digital Songs (Billboard)	2
Finland (Suomen virallinen lista)	1
France (SNEP)	49
Germany (GfK)	8
Germany Dance (Official German Charts)	1
Greece International (IFPI)	17
Hungary (Editors' Choice Top 40)	11
Hungary (Single Top 40)	12
Hungary (Stream Top 40)	3
Ireland (IRMA)	5
Italy (FIMI)	17
Japan Hot 100 (Billboard)	19
Latvia (LaIPA)	6
Lithuania (AGATA)	6
Lebanon Airplay (Lebanese Top 20)	5
Mexico Ingles Airplay (Billboard)	35
Netherlands (Dutch Top 40)	1
Netherlands (Mega Top 50)	1
Netherlands (Single Top 100)	2
New Zealand (Recorded Music NZ)	11
Norway (VG-lista)	2
Poland Airplay (ZPAV)	2
Portugal (AFP)	44
Romania (Airplay 100)	24
Scottish Singles Sales (Official Charts)	6
Slovakia Airplay (ČNS IFPI)	6
Slovakia Singles Digital (ČNS IFPI)	3
Slovenia (SloTop50)	4
Spain (Promusicae)	56
Sweden (Sverigetopplistan)	1
Switzerland (Schweizer Hitparade)	3
UK Singles (Official Charts)	6
Ukraine Airplay (TopHit)	16
US Billboard Hot 100	68
US Dance Club Songs (Billboard)	1
US Hot Dance/Electronic Songs (Billboard)	6
Venezuela (National-Report)	10

=== Year-end charts ===
2019 year-end chart performance for "SOS"
Chart (2019)	Position
Australia (ARIA)	59
Austria (Ö3 Austria Top 40)	20
Belgium (Ultratop Flanders)	18
Belgium (Ultratop Wallonia)	39
Canada (Canadian Hot 100)	71
Denmark (Tracklisten)	21
Germany (Official German Charts)	36
Iceland (Tónlistinn)	28
Ireland (IRMA)	26
Latvia (LAIPA)	62
Netherlands (Dutch Top 40)	15
Netherlands (Single Top 100)	24
Poland (ZPAV)	26
Portugal (AFP)	131
Slovenia (SloTop50)	25
Sweden (Sverigetopplistan)	1
Switzerland (Schweizer Hitparade)	25
UK Singles (Official Charts Company)	34
US Dance Club Songs (Billboard)	2
US Hot Dance/Electronic Songs (Billboard)	12

== Certifications ==
Certifications and sales for "SOS"
Region	Certification	Certified units/sales
Australia (ARIA)	3× Platinum	210,000^{‡}
Belgium (BRMA)	Platinum	40,000^{‡}
Brazil (Pro-Música Brasil)	3× Platinum	120,000^{‡}
Canada (Music Canada)	2× Platinum	160,000^{‡}
Denmark (IFPI Danmark)	2× Platinum	180,000^{‡}
France (SNEP)	Gold	100,000^{‡}
Germany (BVMI)	Platinum	400,000^{‡}
Italy (FIMI)	Platinum	50,000^{‡}
New Zealand (RMNZ)	2× Platinum	60,000^{‡}
Poland (ZPAV)	2× Platinum	100,000^{‡}
Portugal (AFP)	Platinum	10,000^{‡}
Spain (Promusicae)	Gold	30,000^{‡}
United Kingdom (BPI)	2× Platinum	1,200,000^{‡}
United States (RIAA)	Gold	500,000^{‡}
Streaming
Japan (RIAJ)	Gold	50,000,000^{†}
^{‡} Sales+streaming figures based on certification alone.^{†} Streaming-only figures based on certification alone.

== Release history ==
Region	Date	Format	Label	Ref.
Various	10 April 2019	Digital download; streaming	Universal; Geffen	
United States	25 June 2019	Top 40 radio	Universal; Geffen	

== See also ==
- List of Billboard number-one dance songs of 2019
- List of number-one singles of 2019 (Finland)
- List of number-one singles of the 2010s (Sweden)
