= Swingkete Vol. 1 – Maratón =

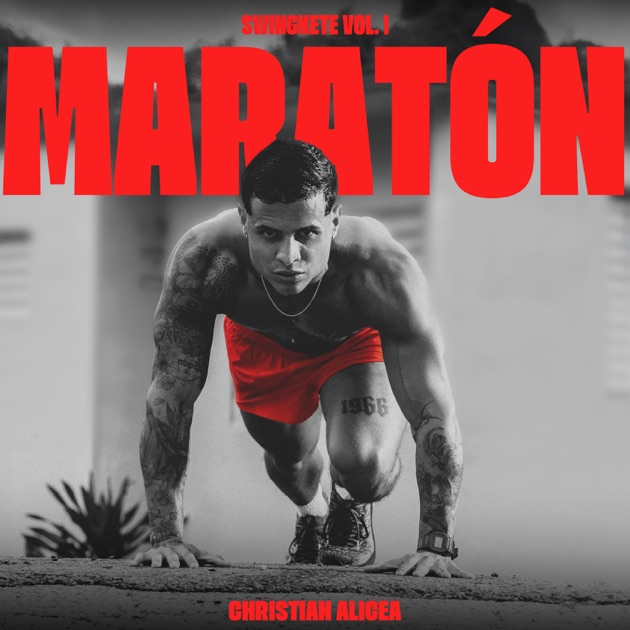

Studio album by Christian Alicea
- Released: June 26, 2025
- Genres: Salsa; Merengue; Bachata
- Length: 50:12
- Labels: Therapist Music; Rimas
- Producers: Urales "Dj Buddha" Vargas; Eliot "El Mago D Oz" Feliciano; Christian Alicea

Christian Alicea chronology
| Yo Deluxe (2024) | Swingkete Vol. 1 – Maratón (2025) |

Singles from Swingkete Vol. 1 – Maratón
- 1. "Hello, What's Up" Released: February 11, 2025; 2. "Me Lo Gozo" Released: June 06, 2025; 3. "Carrusel" Released: June 26, 2025

Swingkete Vol. 1 – Maratón, released on June 26, 2025, is the third studio album by Puerto Rican recording artist Christian Alicea, under a partnership with Therapist Music and Rimas Entertainment.

A musical tribute to his cultural roots spanning from salsa, bachata, merengue, cumbia, bomba, plena and afrobeat. The album features collaborations with Jowell & Randy, J Alvarez, Frabian Eli, Eliot El Mago D Oz, and DJ Buddha.

Within a month, the album was praised by Billboard, which ranked it #9 on its list of the 25 Best Latin Albums of 2025 (so far). It also received acclaim from Rolling Stone, and Remezcla named him one of the top rising Puerto Rican artists to watch during Bad Bunny’s San Juan residency.

The first single "Hello, What's Up" reached the top ten on the Billboard Tropical Airplay Chart. Follow-up singles were "Me Lo Gozo" and "Carrusel".

== Track listing ==
Credits adapted from the album's liner notes

| No. | Title | Writer(s) | Producer(s) | Length |
|---|---|---|---|---|
| 1. | "Hello, What’s Up" | Jorge Luis Chacín Martinez; Christian Bosque Alicea; Urales Vargas; Eliot Feliciano; Jay Dary Castillo | Christian Alicea; Dramos | 3:10 |
| 2. | "Me Lo Gozo" | Dennis Evaristo Ramos Cardona; Bosque Alicea; Vargas; Palacios; Feliciano; Castillo | Eliot El Mago D Oz; Dj Buddha | 2:47 |
| 3. | "Carrusel" (featuring Jowell y Randy & Dj Buddha) | Vladimar "Dj Blass" Felix; Ray C. Rodriguez; Randy Ariel Acevedo Ortiz; Joel Alexis Munoz Martinez; Bosque Alicea; Vargas; Palacios; Feliciano; Castillo | Eliot El Mago D Oz; Dj Buddha | 4:20 |
| 4. | "Desde Arriba" | Omar Soto; Bosque Alicea; Feliciano; Vargas; Castillo | Eliot El Mago D Oz; Dj Buddha | 3:23 |
| 5. | "El Dominó" | Soto; Bosque Alicea; Feliciano; Vargas; Castillo | Eliot El Mago D Oz; Dj Buddha | 3:04 |
| 6. | "Homenaje A J Alvarez" (featuring J Alvarez) | Javid David Alvarez; Nelson Diaz Martinez; Alberto Lozada Algarin; Bosque Alicea; Vargas; Feliciano; Castillo | Eliot El Mago D Oz; Dj Buddha | 3:27 |
| 7. | "Lograré" | Bosque Alicea; Vargas; Palacios; Ramirez; Feliciano; Castillo; Ramos Cardona; Soto | Eliot El Mago D Oz; Dj Buddha | 3:22 |
| 8. | "Fortuna" | Chacín Martinez; Bosque Alicea; Vargas; Feliciano; Castillo | Eliot El Mago D Oz; Dj Buddha | 2:54 |
| 9. | "E.M.U." | William Omar Landron; Eliel Lind Osorio; Jose Nieves-Jaime; Kenny Vazquez Felix; Rafael Pina Nieves; Gabriel Antonio Cruz-Padilla; Eduardo Cabra; Rene Perez; Raymond Ayala; Joan Ortiz Espada; Bosque Alicea; Vargas; Feliciano; Castillo | Eliot El Mago D Oz; Dj Buddha | 6:44 |
| 10. | "Tus Celos" (featuring Eliot El Mago D Oz) | Bosque Alicea; Vargas; Feliciano; Castillo | Eliot El Mago D Oz; Dj Buddha | 3:12 |
| 11. | "SWINGKETE" | Bosque Alicea; Vargas; Feliciano; Castillo | Eliot El Mago D Oz; Dj Buddha | 2:43 |
| 12. | "Bomba Para Afincar" | Luis Armando Lozada Cruz; Bosque Alicea; Vargas; Feliciano; Castillo | Eliot El Mago D Oz; Dj Buddha | 2:39 |
| 13. | "En PR Con Plena" | Bosque Alicea; Vargas; Palacio; Feliciano; Castillo; Ramos Cardona | Eliot El Mago D Oz; Dj Buddha | 2:50 |
| 14. | "Ella Es Así" | Bosque Alicea; Vargas; Feliciano; Castillo; Ramos Cardona | Eliot El Mago D Oz; Dj Buddha | 2:44 |
| 15. | "Gracias" (featuring Frabian Eli) | Frabian Eli Carrion Barreto; Javier Andres Rivera; Bosque Alicea; Vargas; Palacios; Feliciano; Castillo | Frabian Eli; Javier Rivera | 2:46 |
| Total length: | | | | 50:12 |

== Credits and personnel ==
=== Performers ===
- Eliot Feliciano – Piano, Bass, Guitar, coro
- Harold Correa – Trumpet (Track 1,6,7,8,9)
- Caliche Sabogal – Percussions (Track 1,3)
- Cristian Rios – Trombone (Track 1,3,9,13)
- Juan Manuel Rosales – Trumpet (Track 3)
- Camille Vargas - Violin, Viola, Cello (Track 4)
- Denisse Zapata Osorio – coro (Track 4,5)
- Luis Fernando Uribe Murel – Trombone (Track 4,5,6,7,8,12)
- Omar “Puh” Soto – Percussions (Track 4,5,6,7,8,9,12,13)
- Juan Diego Olaya Holguen – Trumpet (Track 4,5,12,13)
- Andy Williams – Trumpet & Guitar (Track 10)
- Jose Francisco Villa Rivera "Pacho" – Bass (Track 13)
- Frabian Eli - Violin (Track 15)

=== Technical ===
- Christian Alicea – executive producer
- Urales "Dj Buddha Vargas – Arranger, programming, Producer, Engineer, Mixer, Mastering, executive producer
- Eliot "El Mago D Oz" Feliciano – Arranger, programming, Producer, Engineer, Mixer, Mastering, executive producer
- Carlos Palacios – associate producer
- Jay Dary Castillo – associate producer
- Francisco M Mejías - Art direction
- Dennis Ramos – Engineer
