= Tough Love (Avicii song) =

Single by Avicii featuring Agnes and Vargas & Lagola

from the album Tim
- Released: 9 May 2019
- Recorded: 2014, 2018
- Genre: Progressive house
- Length: 3:11
- Label: Universal; Geffen
- Songwriters: Tim Bergling; Vincent Pontare; Salem Al Fakir; Isak Alverus
- Producers: Avicii; Vargas & Lagola

Avicii singles chronology
"SOS" (2019)	"Tough Love" (2019)	"Heaven" (2019)

Agnes singles chronology
"Got Me Good" (2013)	"Tough Love" (2019)	"Limelight" (2019)

Vargas and Lagola singles chronology
"Roads" (2018)	"Tough Love" (2019)

Music video
- "Avicii - Tough Love ft. Agnes, Vargas & Lagola" on YouTube

"Tough Love" is the second posthumous single by Swedish DJ Avicii, featuring Swedish singer Agnes and Vargas & Lagola. It was released on 9 May 2019, as the second single from Avicii's posthumous studio album Tim (2019). The single reached the top ten in Sweden, Norway and New Zealand.

== Background ==
Avicii had previously collaborated with Vincent Pontare and Salem Al Fakir of Vargas & Lagola on "Silhouettes", "Hey Brother" ,"Without You" and "Friend of Mine". Avicii had previously worked on the song in 2016 before his last Ultra Miami show. "Tough Love" initially had a different song structure, but was reworked during Tim's final studio sessions in March 2018. Before his death, Tim had sent a message to Salem and Vincent that he wanted the song to be a duet by a "real couple. Or a couple that have worked together enough to be almost considered a couple!" Pontare's wife, Swedish singer Agnes Carlsson, also features on the song. "Tough Love" also features Indian influences from the movie Raanjhanaa (specifically the song Banarasiya) in a melodic passage that was inspired by Avicii studying the music of northwest India, which he had played for Pontare and Al Fakir before his death.

== Credits and personnel ==
Credits adapted from Qobuz.com.

- Avicii – songwriter, producer, bass guitar, keyboards, drum programming, programming
- Vincent Pontare – songwriter, producer, programming
- Salem Al Fakir – songwriter, producer, guitar, strings, programming
- Sebastian Furrer – programming
- Kristoffer Fogelmark – vocal producer
- Isak Alverus – songwriter
- Marcus Thunberg Wessel – engineer
- Kevin Grainger – mixer and mastering
- Sören von Malmborg – additional mixer
- Julio Rodriguez Sangrador – mixer and mastering
- Agnes – vocals
- Vargas and Lagola – vocals

== Charts ==
=== Weekly charts ===
Chart (2019)	Peak position
Austria (Ö3 Austria Top 40)	45
Belgium (Ultratip Bubbling Under Flanders)	18
Canada Hot 100 (Billboard)	82
Czech Republic Singles Digital (ČNS IFPI)	38
Finland (Suomen virallinen lista)	14
Germany (GfK)	72
Hungary (Single Top 40)	38
Hungary (Stream Top 40)	14
Ireland (IRMA)	35
Japan Hot 100 (Billboard)	58
Lithuania (AGATA)	33
Netherlands (Single Top 100)	60
New Zealand Hot Singles (RMNZ)	10
Norway (VG-lista)	9
Scotland Singles (OCC)	95
Slovakia Singles Digital (ČNS IFPI)	28
Sweden (Sverigetopplistan)	2
Switzerland (Schweizer Hitparade)	31
UK Singles (OCC)	60
Ukraine Airplay (TopHit)	13
US Hot Dance/Electronic Songs (Billboard)	9

=== Year-end charts ===
Chart (2019)	Position
Sweden (Sverigetopplistan)	31
US Hot Dance/Electronic Songs (Billboard)	80

== Certifications ==
Region	Certification	Certified units/sales
Brazil (Pro-Música Brasil)	Gold	20,000^{‡}
^{‡} Sales+streaming figures based on certification alone.
