= Tim (Avicii album) =

Studio album by Avicii
- Released: 6 June 2019
- Recorded: 2014, 2017–2018
- Genres: Tropical house; progressive house; dance-pop
- Length: 38:53
- Labels: Geffen; Universal
- Producers: Avicii; Carl Falk; Vargas & Lagola; Albin Nedler; Bonn; Lucas von Bahder; Marcus Thunberg Wessel; Ash Pournouri

Avicii chronology
Avīci (01) (2017)	Tim (2019)	Avicii Forever (2025)

Singles from Tim
- 1. "SOS" Released: 10 April 2019; 2. "Tough Love" Released: 9 May 2019; 3. "Heaven" Released: 6 June 2019; 4. "Fades Away" Released: 5 December 2019

Tim is the third and final studio album by Swedish DJ and producer Avicii, released on 6 June 2019. A sole posthumous album release following his death on 20 April 2018, it was supported by the singles "SOS", "Tough Love", "Heaven" and "Fades Away". All profits from sales of the album go towards the Tim Bergling Foundation, set up following Avicii's death, for mental health awareness. The album reached number one in Belgium, the Netherlands, Sweden, Finland, Lithuania, Norway and reached the top ten in over seventeen countries.

== Background ==
Avicii's third album was first mentioned in late 2016 after he signed with Universal Sweden, when it was said that his next album would be released in 2017. From 13 July to 2 August, Avicii began sharing teasers for new music and later released Avīci (01) on 11 August 2017 with a total of six tracks. In an interview, he stated that (01) was the first of three EPs, with his full third album to be released alongside the third EP. Recording for the album resumed in late 2017. During March 2018, Avicii continued to share updates via Instagram and other streaming sites of different IDs and demos being put together for the album, including what would become "Hold the Line", "Bad Reputation", "Tough Love", "Ain't a Thing", and "Fades Away", amongst other demos. According to Kristoffer Fogelmark, the track "Never Leave Me" was the last track Avicii worked on, finished only two days before he left for Oman.

Following Avicii's death in April 2018, a representative said the following month that there were "no plans" to release any new material in the immediate future. In April 2019, it was announced that collaborators were enlisted to help finish the work on the album. A team of writers and producers made an album described as containing elements of "psychedelia, Arabian music, sounds of the Caribbean and more". The album's track listing was chosen from 16 possible songs. On 1 and 2 June 2019, fans were given a chance to listen to the album 4–5 days early by going to music cubes in various locations around the world.

== Singles ==
The lead single of the album, "SOS", was released on 10 April 2019. A "Fan Memories" video for "SOS", showing quotes from fans about the impact Avicii had on them, was released the same day. "SOS" debuted at number one on the singles chart in Sweden within two days of sales.

"Tough Love" was released as the second single from the album on 9 May 2019. The music video came out on 14 May 2019. "Tough Love" samples A.R. Rahman's track "Banarasiya" from the movie Raanjhanaa (2013).

"Heaven" featuring vocals from Coldplay lead singer Chris Martin was released as the third single for the album on 6 June 2019. The music video, called a "tribute video", which used clips of Avicii in Madagascar (following his final concert), was released on 24 June 2019.

"Fades Away" was released as the fourth and final single on 5 December 2019. While the album version features vocals from Noonie Bao, the single version features vocals from Costa Rican singer MishCatt to coincide with the Avicii Tribute Concert for Mental Health Awareness, where she performed it live.

== Critical reception ==
Professional ratings
Aggregate scores
Source	Rating
AnyDecentMusic?	5.4/10
Metacritic	58/100
Review scores
Source	Rating
AllMusic	3/5 stars
The Arts Desk	3/5 stars
Evening Standard	3/5 stars
NME	3/5 stars
Pitchfork	5.8/10
Rolling Stone	2.5/5 stars
The Sydney Morning Herald	4/5 stars
The Times	2/5 stars

Tim received mixed reviews from music critics. At Metacritic, which assigns a normalized rating out of 100 to reviews from mainstream critics, the album received an average score of 58, based on 4 reviews, which indicates "mixed or average reviews".

Neil Z. Yeung wrote for AllMusic that "with only a handful of moments matching his festival-rocking peaks, the rest of the album relies on passable EDM-pop in the vein of artists like Zedd, Seeb and Marshmello."

== Track listing ==
Tim track listing
No.	Title	Writer(s)	Producer(s)	Length
1.	"Peace of Mind" (featuring Vargas & Lagola)	Tim Bergling; Vincent Pontare; Salem Al Fakir	Bergling; Pontare; Fakir	3:00
2.	"Heaven" (featuring Chris Martin)	Bergling; Martin	Bergling	4:37
3.	"SOS" (featuring Aloe Blacc)	Bergling; Albin Nedler; Kristoffer "Bonn" Fogelmark; Kandi Burruss; Tameka Cottle; Kevin Briggs	Bergling; Nedler; Fogelmark	2:37
4.	"Tough Love" (featuring Agnes and Vargas & Lagola)	Bergling; Fakir; Pontare; Isak Alverus	Bergling; Pontare; Fakir	3:11
5.	"Bad Reputation" (featuring Joe Janiak)	Bergling; Carl Falk; Joseph Janiak	Bergling; Falk	3:25
6.	"Ain't a Thing" (featuring Bonn)	Bergling; Falk; Janiak; Joakim Berg	Bergling; Falk	3:03
7.	"Hold the Line" (featuring Arizona)	Bergling; Lucas von Bahder; Zachary Charles; David Labuguen; Nathan Esquite; PJ Bianco; Andrew Jackson	Bergling; von Bahder; Nedler	2:51
8.	"Freak" (featuring Bonn)	Bergling; Nedler; Fogelmark; Hachidai Nakamura; Rokusuke Ei; Justin Vernon; Samuel Smith; James Napier; William Phillips; Jeff Lynne; Tom Petty	Bergling; Nedler; Fogelmark	2:59
9.	"Excuse Me Mr Sir" (featuring Vargas & Lagola)	Bergling; Al Fakir; Pontare; Marcus Thunberg Wessel	Bergling; Pontare; Fakire; Wessel	3:07
10.	"Heart Upon My Sleeve" (with Imagine Dragons)	Bergling; Ash Pournouri; Dan Reynolds; Wayne Sermon; Ben McKee; Daniel Platzman	Bergling; Pournouri^{[co.]}	4:14
11.	"Never Leave Me" (featuring Joe Janiak)	Bergling; Nedler; Fogelmark; Janiak; Martin Svensson	Bergling; Nedler; Fogelmark	2:51
12.	"Fades Away" (featuring Noonie Bao)	Bergling; Falk; Janiak; Berg	Bergling; Falk	2:58
Total length:				38:53

Japan limited edition bonus DVD
No.	Title	Length
1.	"Avicii : The Story Behind the Album "TIM""	4:13
2.	"Avicii : The Story Behind SOS"	6:54
3.	"SOS" (Fan Memories Video)	2:39

Notes

- ^{^[co.]} signifies a co-producer
- Avicii is credited throughout by his legal name, Tim Bergling
- "Heart Upon My Sleeve" is originally an instrumental track from Avicii's album True.
- "SOS" contains an interpolation of "No Scrubs" by TLC, written by Tameka Cottle, Kandi Burruss, and Kevin "She'kspere" Briggs.
- "Freak" samples the song "Stay with Me", originally written and performed by Sam Smith (which samples Tom Petty's "I Won't Back Down"), and "Sukiyaki", originally sung by Kyu Sakamoto and Written by Ei Rokusuke.

== Personnel ==
Adapted from Billboard.

Production

- Avicii – production (all tracks), vocal production (tracks 1, 2, 4, 5, 7, 9–11), programming (all tracks), drum programming (tracks 1, 4, 9)
- Vargas & Lagola – production (tracks 1, 4, 9), vocal production (tracks 1, 4, 9), programming (tracks 1, 4, 9)
- Carl Falk – production (tracks 5, 6, 12), vocal production (tracks 5, 6, 12), programming (tracks 5, 6, 12)
- Albin Nedler – production (tracks 3, 7, 8, 11), vocal production (tracks 3, 7, 8, 11), programming (tracks 3, 7, 8, 11)
- Kristoffer Fogelmark – production (tracks 3, 8, 11), vocal production (tracks 3, 8, 11), programming (tracks 3, 8, 11)
- Sebastian Furrer – programming (track 4)
- Lucas von Bahder – production (track 7)
- Marcus Thunberg Wessel – production (track 9), vocal production (track 9)
- Ash Pournouri – co-production (track 10, uncredited)

Vocals

Technical

- Marcus Thunberg Wessel – engineering (track 9)
- Richard "Segal" Huredia – engineering (track 3)
- Kevin Grainger – mixing and mastering (track 2 and 3)

Instruments

- Avicii – keyboards (all tracks), bass guitar (tracks 1, 4, 9)
- Salem Al Fakir – guitar (tracks 1, 4, 9), bass guitar (track 9), strings (track 1), violin (track 4), vocals (tracks 1, 4 and 9)
- Vincent Pontare – drums (track 1), vocals (tracks 1, 4 and 9)
- Chris Martin – guitar (track 2), vocals (track 2)
- Albin Nedler – keyboards (track 3, 8, 11), guitar (track 8)
- Kristoffer "Bonn" Fogelmark – keyboards (track 3, 8, 10, 11), guitar (track 8), vocals (tracks 6, 8)
- Aloe Blacc – vocals (track 3)
- Agnes – vocals (track 4)
- Carl Falk – keyboards (tracks 5, 6, 12)
- Joe Janiak – vocals (tracks 5, 11)
- Zachary Hannah – vocals (track 7)
- Wayne Sermon – guitar (track 10)
- Dan Reynolds – vocals (track 10)
- Noonie Bao – vocals (track 12)

== Charts ==
=== Weekly charts ===
Weekly chart performance for Tim
Chart (2019)	Peak position
Australian Albums (ARIA)	6
Austrian Albums (Ö3 Austria)	3
Belgian Albums (Ultratop Flanders)	1
Belgian Albums (Ultratop Wallonia)	5
Canadian Albums (Billboard)	3
Czech Albums (ČNS IFPI)	3
Danish Albums (Hitlisten)	3
Dutch Albums (Album Top 100)	1
Finnish Albums (Suomen virallinen lista)	1
French Albums (SNEP)	11
German Albums (Offizielle Top 100)	5
Hungarian Albums (MAHASZ)	20
Irish Albums (IRMA)	6
Italian Albums (FIMI)	5
Japanese Albums (Oricon)	9
Japanese Hot Albums (Billboard Japan)	3
Latvian Albums (LaIPA)	2
Lithuanian Albums (AGATA)	1
New Zealand Albums (RMNZ)	8
Norwegian Albums (VG-lista)	1
Polish Albums (ZPAV)	10
Portuguese Albums (AFP)	12
Scottish Albums (Official Charts)	10
Slovak Albums (ČNS IFPI)	4
Spanish Albums (Promusicae)	4
Swedish Albums (Sverigetopplistan)	1
Swiss Albums (Schweizer Hitparade)	2
UK Albums (Official Charts)	7
US Billboard 200	11
US Top Dance Albums (Billboard)	1

=== Year-end charts ===
2019 year-end chart performance for Tim
Chart (2019)	Position
Belgian Albums (Ultratop Flanders)	21
Belgian Albums (Ultratop Wallonia)	102
Danish Albums (Hitlisten)	70
Dutch Albums (Album Top 100)	37
French Albums (SNEP)	148
Latvian Albums (LaIPA)	57
Swedish Albums (Sverigetopplistan)	4
Swiss Albums (Schweizer Hitparade)	71
US Top Dance/Electronic Albums (Billboard)	11

2020 year-end chart performance for Tim
Chart (2020)	Position
Belgian Albums (Ultratop Flanders)	199
Swedish Albums (Sverigetopplistan)	16

2021 year-end chart performance for Tim
Chart (2021)	Position
Swedish Albums (Sverigetopplistan)	70

== Certifications ==
Certifications for Tim
Region	Certification	Certified units/sales
Denmark (IFPI Danmark)	Platinum	20,000^{‡}
France (SNEP)	Gold	50,000^{‡}
Italy (FIMI)	Gold	25,000^{‡}
New Zealand (RMNZ)	Gold	7,500^{‡}
Poland (ZPAV)	Gold	10,000^{‡}
United Kingdom (BPI)	Silver	60,000^{‡}
^{‡} Sales+streaming figures based on certification alone.
