= Jojo (disambiguation) =

Jojo is a given name, surname, nickname and stage name of several people and fictional characters.

Jojo, JoJo or Jo Jo may also refer to:

== Music ==
- JoJo (album), by JoJo, 2004
- "Jojo" (Boz Scaggs song), 1980
- "Jojo", a song by Jacques Brel, 1977
- "Jo Jo", a song by The King Brothers, 1966
- "Jojo", a song by Jeff Phillips, 1978
- "Jo Jo", a song by Marvin & Johnny, 1954
- "Jo Jo", a song by Gino Vannelli from the 1974 album Powerful People
- "Jo Jo", a song by Shinee from the 2009 album 2009, Year of Us
- "JoJo (Sono Chi no Sadame)", a song by Hiroaki "Tommy" Tominaga, 2012
- "Jo-Jo", a song by Tony! Toni! Toné! from the 1990 album The Revival
- K-Ci & JoJo, an R&B duo

== Other uses ==
- JoJo (restaurant), a restaurant in New York City
- Jojo (restaurant), a restaurant in Portland, Oregon
- Jojo (chimpanzee), the oldest chimpanzee in Europe
- Jōjō Castle, in Kasugai, Aichi Prefecture, Japan
- JoJo Lake (Ontario), in Canada
- Jojo, a 1988 novel by Roger Caron
- JOJO (Turkish children's channel)
- Jojos, potato wedges

== See also ==
- JoJo's Bizarre Adventure (disambiguation)
- JoJo Maman Bébé, a maternity wear and baby clothing retailer
- Yoyo (disambiguation)
