= Rasmus Thude =

Danish singer

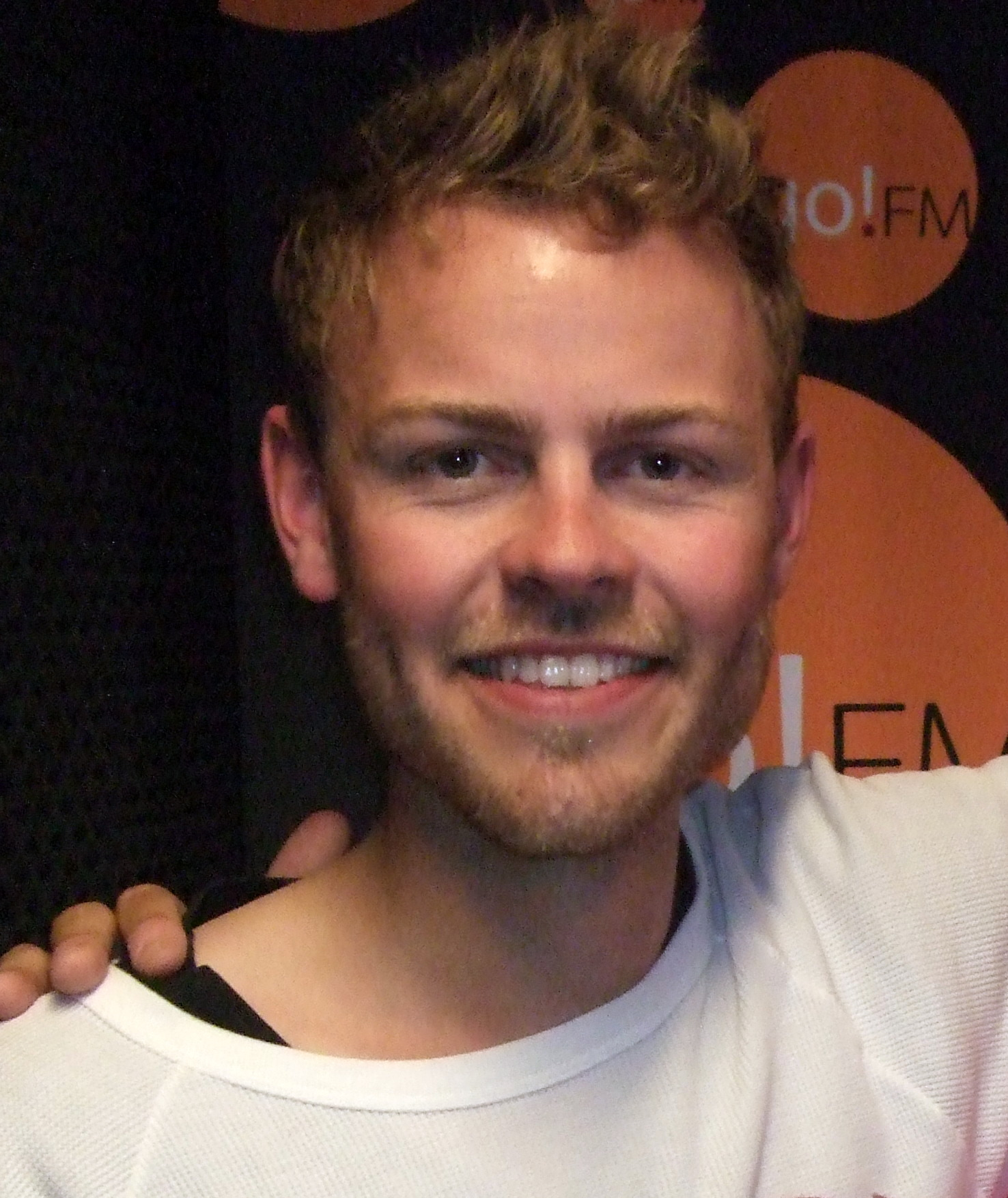

Background information
- Born: 26 March 1989 (age 36); Aarhus, Denmark
- Genres: Urban pop
- Occupation: Singer
- Instruments: Vocals, drums, keyboards
- Years active: 2010–present
- Label: Sony Music
- Website: www.rasmusthude.dk

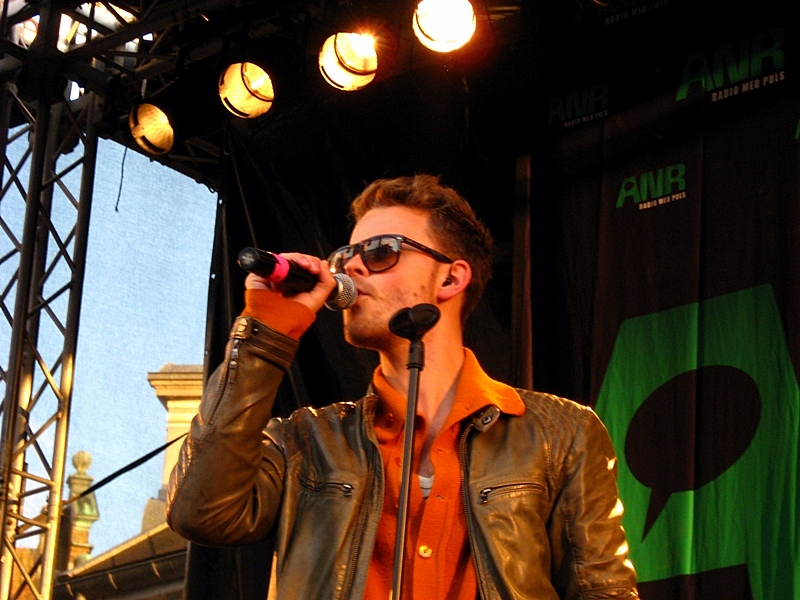
Rasmus Thude (2011)

Rasmus Thude (born in Aarhus, Denmark on 26 March 1989) is a Danish singer and songwriter with more than 20 million plays worldwide. He has previously participated in the Danish X Factor in 2010. In January 2011 his song LLL (Love, Liquor, Lick It) got him worldwide attention when it was mistaken for the American singer, Justin Timberlake. The song had been renamed "Take You Down" and both media and fans thought it was a new single from JT. In 2014 Rasmus Thude enrolled at DTU (Danish Technical University) studying Processing and Innovation. In 2015 he created his first app start-up "Ta' det", where he is currently working as CEO.

== Music ==
In 2011 Rasmus Thude signed with Instant Major Management and later that same year he signed his first labeldeal with Sony Music Denmark. In March 2012, he was appointed "Big in 2012" by the Danish music magazine GAFFA. He released his debut EP Seks hjerter in November 2012 on Sony Music.

In June 2011 he released his first single, "Til Månen & Tilbage" which peaked at number 16 on the Danish Singles Chart. His second single, "Gider dig ikke mer'" peaked at number 19 on the Danish Singles Chart, but went into top 10 on the Danish streaming chart. The single was certified platinum with more than 1.8 million streams. His third single "Fest med de bedst feat. Niklas" didn't make it to the charts, but was certified gold with more than 900.000 streams.

== Discography ==
=== EP'er ===
- Seks hjerter (2012)

=== Singler ===
Year	Title	Top placement		Certification	Album
Year	Title	Download	Streaming	Certification	Album
2011	"Til månen & tilbage"	16	—		Seks hjerter
2012	"Gider dig ikke mer'"	19	8	Platinum (streaming)	Seks hjerter
2012	"Fest med de bedst" (featuring Niklas)	—	—	Gold (streaming)	Seks hjerter
2013	"Elsk mig igen"	—	—		Seks hjerter
"—" marks a release that has not achieved chart success.

- "Til månen & tilbage" also appeared in a remix version with Young and James Kayn.

== Guest appearances ==
Year	Title	Album
2012	"Natteblind" (Joey Moe featuring Rasmus Thude)	Midnat
2013	"Ivrig" (Young featuring Rasmus Thude)	Picasso med en afro
2013	"10 shots" (#Hype featuring Rasmus Thude)	Single release
