= Lisa Rowe =

German singer

Lisa Rowe is a German/Danish singer living in Germany. She released her dance/dubstep-oriented EP I Am Lisa Rowe in 2012 with DLA black UK. Single releases include "Black Light" and "Lost in You". She is also known by her collaborations with a number of artists where she is featuring in their recordings like Virtual Riot ("In Your Hands", "Alive"), Culture Code ("Over Again") and NyxSyrinxNelio ("Home").

Her first major charting release is a collaboration with Danish duo Nik & Jay called "United" that went in straight to #1 on Tracklisten, the official Danish Singles Charts.

== Discography ==
=== EPs ===
- 2012: I Am Lisa Rowe

=== Singles ===
- 2012: "Black Light"
- 2012: "Lost in You"

Featured in

Year	Single	Charts	Certification	Album
Year	Single	DEN	Certification	Album
2013	"United" (Nik & Jay feat. Lisa Rowe)	1		From Nik & Jay EP; Copenhagen Pop Cartel
2013	"Feed Me Diamonds" (Alex C feat. Lisa Rowe)			
