= Yoyo (Bahamut Lagoon) =

Bahamut Lagoon character

- Yoyo in Bahamut's Lagoon
- First game: Bahamut Lagoon (1996)
- Created by: Motomu Toriyama

Yoyo (Japanese: ヨヨ) is a character in the 1996 video game Bahamut Lagoon. She was designed by Motomu Toriyama, and can be named along with the protagonist, Byuu. The game follows her story as the princess of the land of Kahna, particularly managing her kingdom, dealing with the opposing Granbelow Empire, and her romance with the empire's General Palpaleos. Her romance was a contentious thing for some players of the game, who were upset that she fell for the general instead of Byuu, partly due to some of these players naming her after a girl they liked. This led to her being labelled by these players as one of "Square's Three Big Bad Women", which writer Kurt Kalata speculated was because the people upset were in school at the time.

== Concept and design ==
Yoyo was created by Motomu Toriyama for Bahamut Lagoon, and he identified her as one of his favorite female characters from video games, alongside Yuna and Lightning from Final Fantasy X and XIII respectively.

== Appearances ==
Yoyo appeared in the 1996 video game Bahamut Lagoon, with the player given the choice to name her alongside the protagonist Byuu. As Byuu is a silent protagonist with minimal interactions, the game largely follows the events unfolding around Yoyo, the princess of the land of Kahna. The game explores her struggles with balancing her responsibilities to her homeland and satiating the aggressive Granbelos Empire, who antagonize and wish to use her for her connections with the world's dragons, which they wish to acquire for world domination. Her budding romantic interest with the empire's General Palpaleos also causes complications.

== Reception ==
Yoyo has received mixed reception for her role in Bahamut Lagoon. She is considered among Japanese fans of role-playing games to be one of the three most infamous women in Square Soft video games, the group referred to as "The Three Great She-Devils of Square" and "Square's Three Big Bad Women". This designation is typically given to four certain characters; including Yoyo, it is also applied to Princess Alicia from Live-A-Live, Mireille from The Final Fantasy Legend, and Rinoa Heartilly from Final Fantasy VIII. Yoyo has been given this designation due to her choosing of the game's antagonist General Palpeleos as a romantic partner over the protagonist. Hardcore Gaming 101 writer Kurt Kalata argued that the reason Yoyo received this negative reaction was because the people who played Bahamut Lagoon were largely schoolboys who were used to playing video games as a form of wish fulfillment. He observed that the ability to rename the protagonist and Yoyo played into this; male players inserted their own name and the name of a girl they liked into the game, making Yoyo's rejection of the protagonist more personal. While much of this reaction comes from the Japanese role-playing game community, with Japan being the only region the game was officially released, Kalata noted he had seen similar response from English language players who had played the game's unofficial fan translation.

IT Media writer Kontake considered her the most "evil" of the "bad women" of Square games, attributing this to the fact that her name can be changed, arguing like Kalata that people named her after a girl they like. They also touched upon her line about how sad it is to become an adult, considering it a realistic feeling. Inside Games Mikame, while not going through the pains over Yoyo when she originally played it due to being a woman, still sympathized with male players due to being able to name Yoyo, similarly discussing the relatability of Yoyo's comments on adulthood. Fellow Inside Games writer Chi Bi discussed how painful it was to see Yoyo falling for Palpeleos instead of the protagonist, her childhood friend. He suggested that the closest to this feeling is the concept of netorare (NTR), though noted that it didn't fit entirely due to them not having been in a relationship already. Despite noting some people's negative reception to Yoyo, particularly her being one of "Square's three greatest villains", he couldn't bring himself to dislike her. He attributed this to the novelization of the game, which explored Yoyo's feelings and remorse about the situation, as well as being happy to see that the protagonist may still find love with another character.

Hardcore Gaming 101 writer Brendon Taylor argued that Yoyo was the true protagonist of the story, stating that the plot centers around her "doubts and development" and that the protagonist, like the player, becomes an observer. Her being the true star of the story was a sentiment shared by Kurt Kalata in A Guide to Japanese Role-Playing Games, where he discussed how she was among the most unusual characters in the cast and how she subverts the trope of the female main character falling for the protagonist. Dengeki Online writer Masan felt that she would be remembered for generations, stating that her actions have become known to people who have not played the game. They expressed shock in her falling for Palpeleos, though today they considered it an innovative way for the story to go. Fellow Dengeki Online writer Tasun noted how he could not forgive Yoyo, both for not falling for the protagonist and not showing gratitude for him rescuing her. Staff for 4gamer noted that Yoyo falling for Palpeleos was a traumatizing incident for them.
