= Sisse Marie =

- Born: Sisse Marie Holzmann Søby; 21 November 1985 (age 40); Aalborg, Denmark
- Origin: Klarup, Denmark
- Genres: Electronic Music, Club Disco
- Occupations: actress, singer, model, TV hostess, songwriter
- Years active: 2001–present
- Labels: disco:wax, Nexus Music, Sony Music DK
- Website: sissemarie.com

Sisse Marie Holzmann Søby (born 21 November 1985) is a Danish actress, singer, model, TV hostess and songwriter.

== Biography ==
She was born in Aalborg. In 2001 she won the MGP Junior, which led to a gold certified album. The following year she received a Grammy for Best Teen Album. Since then, she worked as a model in Milan, London, Atlanta, Copenhagen, Oslo, Munich, Amsterdam, Istanbul and Stockholm. She has done model photos, catalogues and billboards for Tiffany Bridal, O'Neill, Heineken, Volvo, Citroën and Wonderbra. She has done photo series and covers of Cosmopolitan, T3, Ché and Marie Claire and runway for Italian Vogue.

In 2005 she released the single "Boom", which went in at No. 4 on the official Danish single chart. The following year she began as a hostess at the Danish MTV, and made the subsequent two seasons. Her program was MTV's most watched.

On 25 October 2010 she released the now gold certified single "Every Time (You Look at Me)". The song went straight to number 1 in Denmark and the music video was on the release day the 8th most watched on YouTube in the world. On 9 May 2011 she released the single "Dirty Hands" which went No. 1 on MTV Denmark and Brazil. 19 February she released the single "Kill for Your Love" which went No. 1 on MTV Denmark that week and was shown on the national TV-channel DR MAMA.

On 15 November 2012 Sisse Marie had her song "Paralyzed" featured in life simulation video game The Sims 3. She was also designed as a digital character in the game. The game has sold more than 150 million copies worldwide.

In 2014, Sisse Marie moved to the United States after securing an American record deal, and shortly after, she was cast to star in several American feature films and television series. She has since appeared in and produced several independent projects, among them the festival short The Lost Princess (2023) and the features Let’s Make It (2018) and Wonderland Recoil (2022).

In 2019, Sisse Marie was cast to star in the award-winning Freeform TV series Siren playing Yura, a feral mermaid and leader of the merpeople colony in Nome, Alaska. She has a role in the 2021 comedy The House Next Door: Meet the Blacks 2. She was featured as Astrid in director Zack Snyder's movies Rebel Moon – Part One: A Child of Fire (2023) and Rebel Moon – Part Two: The Scargiver (2024).

== Discography ==
=== Studio albums ===
Year	Details	Track listing	Peak Position	Certifications
Year	Details	Track listing	DEN	Certifications
2001	Du har Brug for Mig: Released: 2001; Label: Universal Music DK; Format: CD	1. D.J. Baby (3:03); 2. Du har brug for mig (2:49); 3. Dine øjne smiler (2:52); 4. Phillip (3:20); 5. Dig og Mig (3:48); 6. Hvis jeg ku' (3:25); 7. Gi' mig dine drømme (3:14); 8. En som dig (4:06); 9. Altid sammen (3:40); 10. Sig mig (3:15); 11. Det blir'r aldrig os igen (3:07); 12. Tag mig som jeg er (2:55); 13. Kom afsted (3:39); 14. Wondergirl (3:04); 15. Du har brug for mig (Remix) (4:18)	21	Gold
"—" denotes that the release did not chart.

=== Singles ===
Year	Song	Peak chart positions	Album
Year	Song	DEN	Album
2005	"Boom"	5	non-album single
2010	"Every Time (You Look at Me)" (ft. Morten Breum)	1	non-album single
2011	"Dirty Hands"	12	non-album single
2012	"Kill for Your Love"	43	non-album single
2012	"Paralyzed" (ft. Jay Adams and TooManyLeftHands)	—	non-album single
"—" denotes releases that did not chart.

== Filmography ==
Film and television appearances and roles
Year	Title	Role	Notes
2017	The Dunning Man	Ursela	
2020	Siren	Yura	
2020	Wonderland Recoil	ceilA	
2021	The House Next Door: Meet the Blacks 2	Vampire Chick #2	
2023	Rebel Moon – Part One: A Child of Fire	Astrid	
2024	Rebel Moon – Part Two: The Scargiver	Astrid	

== See also ==
- Nexus Music
- Morten Breum
