= Yo (Christian Alicea album) =

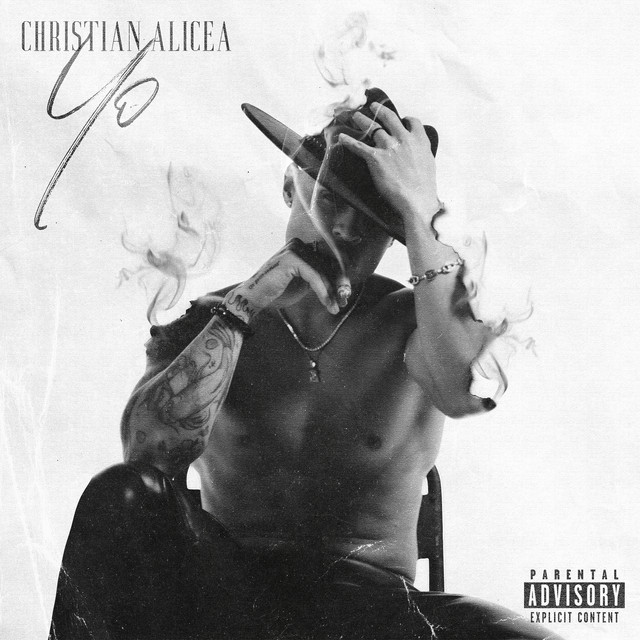

Studio album by Christian Alicea
- Released: May 19, 2023
- Genre: Salsa; Merengue; Bachata
- Length: 53:21
- Label: Therapist Music
- Producer: Urales "Dj Buddha Vargas; Eliot "El Mago D Oz"; Christian Alicea

Christian Alicea chronology
Yo (2023)	Yo Deluxe (2024)

Singles from Yo
- 1. "Cobarde" Released: February 18, 2022; 2. "Vuelve" Released: June 17, 2022; 3. "Sube Tela" Released: January 27, 2023; 4. "El Swing" Released: September 29, 2023

Yo is the debut studio album by Puerto Rican salsa singer Christian Alicea. It was released on May 19, 2023. The album features a blend of traditional salsa, with merengue and bachata fused with modern, urban influences and includes collaborations with artists such as J Alvarez, Rafa Pabön, Maffio, Tonny Tun Tun, Nacho, DJ Nelson, Dj Buddha & Eliot El Mago D Oz.

The album singles, "Vuelve" and "Cobarde", were included on the album, having already achieved success by charting on the U.S. Billboard Tropical Airplay chart and reaching the top 10 on salsa charts in Colombia and Dominican Republic, and the project received a nomination for Best Tropical Album at the 2024 Premios Juventud.

Yo was produced by Eliot "El Mago D Oz" and DJ Buddha, and was titled "Yo" (Spanish for "I" or "Me") as a representation of Alicea's personal essence, passion, and musical journey.

The music was described by Primera Hora as "salsa urbana", intended to honor Puerto Rican culture while encouraging listeners to "celebrate life" through dance.

== Accolades ==
Year	Award	Category	Result
2024	Premios Juventud	Best Tropical Album	Nominated
2024	Premio Lo Nuestro	Tropical Album of the Year	Nominated

== Track listing ==
Credits adapted from the album's liner notes

No.	Title	Writer(s)	Producer(s)	Length
1.	"El Swing"	Christian Bosque Alicea; Urales Vargas; Carlos Palacios; Joshua Ramirez; Eliot Feliciano; Jay Dary Castillo	Eliot El Mago D Oz; Dj Buddha	3:33
2.	"Aroma"	Bosque Alicea; Vargas; Palacios; Ramirez; Feliciano; Castillo; Daniel Alejandro Ospina Garcia	Eliot El Mago D Oz; Dj Buddha	3:25
3.	"Me Quiere"	Richard Martin; Bosque Alicea; Vargas; Palacios; Ramirez; Feliciano; Castillo	Eliot El Mago D Oz; Dj Buddha	2:48
4.	"Quiero Un Trago" (featuring Nacho & Maffio)	Carlos Ariel Perlta; Miguel Ignacio Mendoza; Alejandro Quintero; Bosque Alicea; Vargas	Maffio	3:14
5.	"Cobarde"	Frankie J Bautista; Bosque Alicea; Vargas; Palacios; Ramirez; Feliciano; Ospina Garcia; Juan Alberto Quiles	Eliot El Mago D Oz; Dj Buddha	3:51
6.	"Sube Tela"	Saul Alexander Castillo Vasquez; Abner Gerardino Suero Encarnación; Keyla Alexandra Rodriguez Gavilan; Bosque Alicea; Vargas; Palacios; Ramirez; Feliciano; Castillo	Eliot El Mago D Oz; Dj Buddha	3:07
7.	"Vuelve"	Luis Segura; Bosque Alicea; Vargas; Palacios; Ramirez; Feliciano; Castillo	Eliot El Mago D Oz; Dj Buddha	2:43
8.	"Bendición Mame y Pape"	Bosque Alicea; Vargas; Palacios; Ramirez; Feliciano; Castillo; Dennis Evaristo Ramos Cardona	Eliot El Mago D Oz; Dj Buddha	2:40
9.	"Fiestón" (featuring El Pepo Show)	Ubaldo Tatis Carrillo; Castillo Vasquez; Rodriguez Gavilan; Bosque Alicea; Vargas; Palacios; Ramirez; Feliciano; Castillo	Eliot El Mago D Oz; Dj Buddha	3:14
10.	"Se Le Nota" (featuring Dj Nelson & Alejandro Armes)	Nelson Diaz; Omar Soto; Bosque Alicea; Vargas; Palacios; Ramirez; Feliciano	Eliot El Mago D Oz; Dj Buddha	3:30
11.	"Fuego Nos Quema" (featuring Eliot El Mago D Oz)	Bosque Alicea; Vargas; Palacios; Ramirez; Feliciano; Castillo	Eliot El Mago D Oz; Dj Buddha	3:31
12.	"Cobarde Remix" (featuring J Alvarez)	Javid Alvarez; Bautista; Bosque Alicea; Vargas; Palacios; Ramirez; Feliciano; Quiles; Ospina Garcia	Eliot El Mago D Oz; Dj Buddha	3:50
13.	"Sube Tela Remix" (featuring Rafa Pabön & Tonny Tun Tun)	Rafael E Pabon Navedo; Juan Antonio; Castillo Vasquez; Suero Encarnación; Rodriguez Gavilan; Bosque Alicea; Vargas; Palacios; Ramirez; Feliciano; Castillo	Eliot El Mago D Oz; Dj Buddha	4:08
14.	"Que Rica" (featuring Dj Buddha)	Maiquin Esteban Maldonado German; Fausto Mendoza; Brian Herrera; Richie Herrera; Bosque Alicea; Vargas; Palacios; Ramirez; Feliciano; Castillo	Dj Buddha; Maiky Sax	3:40
15.	"Se Acabó"	Bosque Alicea; Vargas; Palacios; Ramirez; Feliciano; Castillo; Ramos Cardona	Eliot El Mago D Oz; Dj Buddha	5:15
16.	"Bésame"	Bosque Alicea; Vargas; Palacios; Ramirez; Feliciano; Castillo; Ethan G M Mau-Asam; Kernel Andy Shearman	Dj Buddha; Ethan Morris	3:04
Total length:				53:21

== Credits and personnel ==
=== Performers ===
- Eliot Feliciano – Piano, Bass, coro
- Eliezer Gonzalez - Bass (Track 1, 2)
- Caliche Sabogal – Congas, Timbales (Track 1, 2)
- Harold Correa – Trumpet (Track 1, 2)
- Luis Carabina – Trombone (Track 1, 3, 6, 7, 10, 11, 13)
- Emanuel Vargas Ortíz – Cuatro (Track 1)
- Juan Pablo Castaño – Trumpet (Track 2, 5, 6, 8, 9, 10, 12, 13)
- Cristian Rios – Trombone (Track 2, 8, 9, 12)
- Juan Bayer “Cosito” – Congas, Timbales (Track 3, 5, 7, 11, 12)
- Carlos Mora - Bass (Track 5, 12)
- Vladimir Areiza – Trombone (Track 5, 12)
- Juan Esteban Duque – Electric guitar (Track 5, 12)
- Daniel Alejandro Ospina Garcia – Synths (Track 5, 12)
- Juan Alberto Quiles - Synths (Track 5, 12)
- Yoamys Jerez – coro (Track 5, 12)
- Jose Juvinao - Bass (Track 7)
- Camille Vargas – Violin (Track 7)
- Omar "Puh" Soto – Congas, Timbales (Track 10)
- Dahian El Apechao - Piano (Track 14)
- Kikin El Mulato - Bass (Track 14)
- Jose Rodriguez - Tambora (Track 14)
- Pachy Guira - Guira (Track 14)
- Daniel Ogando - Conga (Track 14)
- Manny Fernandez - Timbales & Drums (Track 14)
- Klaudin Hurtado - Trumpet (Track 14)
- Jose Frank - Trumpet (Track 14)
- Albert Santana - Trumpet (Track 14)
- Maiky Sax - Sax (Track 14)
- Memin El Sucesor - Percussion, Bass & Guitars (Track 15)
- Ethan Morris - Drum Programming (Track 16)

=== Technical ===
- Christian Alicea – executive producer
- Urales Vargas – Arranger, programming, Producer, Engineer, Mixer, Mastering, executive producer
- Eliot "El Mago D Oz" Feliciano – Arranger, programming, Producer, Engineer, Mixer, Mastering, executive producer
- Carlos Palacios – Art direction, associate producer
- Joshua Ramirez – associate producer
- Jay Dary Castillo – associate producer
- Juan Esteban Duque – Engineer, Mixer
- Dennis Ramos – Engineer
- Sheeno El Sensei – Engineer
