= Never Be Alone =

Single by David Guetta and Morten featuring Aloe Blacc
- Released: 19 July 2019
- Recorded: 2019
- Length: 2:58
- Label: What a Music
- Songwriters: David Guetta; Giorgio Tuinfort; Aloe Blacc; Morten Breum; Mike Hawkins; Toby Green
- Producers: David Guetta; Morten Breum; Mike Hawkins; Toby Green

David Guetta singles chronology
"Thing for You" (2019)	"Never Be Alone" (2019)	"Jump" (2019)

Morten singles chronology
"Baíle de Favela" (2018)	"Never Be Alone" (2019)	"Magnolia" (2019)

Aloe Blacc singles chronology
"SOS" (2019)	"Never Be Alone" (2019)	"Hurt People" (2019)

"Never Be Alone" is a song by French DJ David Guetta and Danish DJ and producer Morten, featuring vocals from American singer and songwriter Aloe Blacc. It was released as a single on 19 July 2019 by record label What a Music. The song was written by David Guetta, Giorgio Tuinfort, Aloe Blacc, Morten Breum, Mike Hawkins and Toby Green.

== Track listing ==
Digital download
No.	Title	Length
1.	"Never Be Alone" (feat. Aloe Blacc)	2:58

Digital download – Instrumental (Extended)
No.	Title	Length
1.	"Never Be Alone" (feat. Aloe Blacc) (Instrumental) (Extended)	4:11

== Charts ==
=== Weekly charts ===
Chart (2019–2020)	Peak position
Australia Digital Track Chart (ARIA)	39
Hungary (Dance Top 40)	17
Switzerland (Schweizer Hitparade)	69

=== Year-end charts ===
Chart (2020)	Position
Hungary (Dance Top 40)	56
