= Cisilia =

Danish singer

Cisilia Ismailova (born 19 December 1998) is a Danish singer from Copenhagen better known by her mononym Cisilia. She was born to mixed Macedonian and Moroccan origins. Her debut album Unge øjne topped Hitlisten, the official Danish Albums chart with her hit single "Vi to datid nu" going double platinum in Denmark. She is signed to Nexus Music and distributed through Universal Music Denmark. At the Danish Music Awards 2015, she became the youngest winner ever (at the age of 16 years), when she won in the categories Hit of the Year ("Vi To Datid Nu") and Best New Artist.

== Discography ==
=== Albums ===
Year	Album	Peak positions	Certification
Year	Album	DEN	Certification
2015	Unge Øjne	1	Gold

=== Singles ===
Year	Single	Peak positions	Certification	Album
Year	Single	DEN	Certification	Album
2014	"Ring den alarm"	25		Unge øjne
2015	"Vi to datid nu"	4	2× Platinum	Unge øjne
2015	"Luftballon"	21	Gold	Unge øjne
2016	"Kold December" (featuring Hasan Shah)	17		TBA
