= JoJo's Bizarre Adventure (disambiguation) =

JoJo's Bizarre Adventure is a manga series written and illustrated by Hirohiko Araki.

JoJo's Bizarre Adventure may also refer to:

- JoJo's Bizarre Adventure (OVA), an OVA adaptation of Stardust Crusaders produced by A.P.P.P. from 1993 to 2002.
- JoJo's Bizarre Adventure (TV series), an anime television series adaptation produced by David Production.
- JoJo's Bizarre Adventure, a 1993 Super Nintendo video game, see List of JoJo's Bizarre Adventure video games
- JoJo's Bizarre Adventure (video game), a 1998 arcade video game
