= Heaven (Avicii song) =

Single by Avicii featuring Chris Martin

from the album Tim
- Released: 6 June 2019
- Recorded: May 2014
- Genre: Progressive house
- Length: 4:37
- Label: Universal
- Songwriters: Tim Bergling; Chris Martin
- Producer: Tim Bergling

Avicii singles chronology
"Tough Love" (2019)	"Heaven" (2019)	"Fades Away (Tribute Concert Version)" (2019)

Chris Martin singles chronology
"Someone That Loves You '19" (2019)	"Heaven" (2019)	"Stratosphere" (2019)

Music video
- "Heaven (Tribute Video)" on YouTube

"Heaven" is the third posthumous single by Swedish DJ Avicii, featuring vocals by Chris Martin of British band Coldplay. The song was released on 6 June 2019, as the third single from Avicii's posthumous studio album Tim. The song became his third single, and his second posthumously, to reach number one on Billboard's Dance/Mix Show Airplay chart in its 27 July 2019 issue. Additionally it reached the top ten in over eleven countries.

== Recording ==
The song was recorded with Chris Martin in 2014, a couple of months after they had finished "A Sky Full of Stars". It first premiered during Avicii's set at Future Music Festival in 2015. During the period of 2015 until 2019, there have been different versions of the song circulating the web, a couple demos featuring singer Simon Aldred and a couple featuring Chris Martin. Eventually, Avicii's team chose to release the version featuring Chris.

In 2015, Avicii premiered "Heaven" at 2015 Ultra Music Festival with singer, Simon Aldred, and said he thought he did the track justice. "Heaven" is thought to originally have been planned for release on Avicii's sophomore album "Stories" in 2015, but ended up being scrapped so Avicii could continue working on it. In 2016, Avicii worked on a version of "Heaven" with producer Carl Falk, now including a revamped vocal from singer Simon Aldred and electric guitars. Avicii played this version of the track during the course of 2016, until his retirement. Before his death, Tim told the chief executive officer of Universal Music Sweden, Per Sundin, that he wanted to release the version with Chris Martin instead. The song was played in his memory by Nicky Romero during Kingsland Festival in 2018. As Nicky said, Tim sent to him a folder full of new music, mostly unfinished but still usable for the shows. On 27 May 2018, the song was leaked online after being played by NRJ radio.

In April 2019, it was announced that the album Tim, which Avicii was working on before his death, would include the song "Heaven" in the album, which was released on 6 June 2019.

In December 2019, "Heaven" was sung live by singer Simon Aldred at the Avicii Tribute Concert benefiting the Tim Bergling Foundation.

== Music video ==
The lyric video was released on 6 June 2019. The music video, called a "tribute video", which used old clips of Avicii at Madagascar (following his last concert performance in 2016) was released on 24 June 2019. In the music video, Tim was joined by his longtime producer Levan Tsikurishvili and his childhood friend Awat to have a vacation together on the island of II Saint Marie with video collections of him walking and enjoying around the island.

== Remixes ==
On 27 July 2019, David Guetta played the remix of the song of "Heaven" at the Tomorrowland festival featuring Morten. The song was released on 23 August 2019. The remix turns the progressive house style of the song into a more paced, future rave remix of the song.

== Credits and personnel ==
Credits adapted from YouTube and Expressen.

- Avicii – songwriter, producer, bass guitar, keyboards, drum programming, programming
- Chris Martin – vocals, songwriter, guitar
- Simon Aldred – demo & live vocals (2015 & 2016 & Avicii Tribute Concert versions)
- Carl Falk – mixer and mastering, electric guitar (2016 demo version)
- Marcus Thunberg Wessel – engineer, assistant mixer
- Kevin Grainger – mixer and mastering
- Julio Rodriguez Sangrador – assistant mixer and mastering
- Christopher Thordson – manager
- Per Sundin – designer
- Neil Jacobson – designer
- Nick Groff – designer
- Johnny Tennander – designer

== Charts ==
=== Weekly charts ===
Chart (2019)	Peak position
Australia (ARIA)	20
Australia Dance (ARIA)	3
Austria (Ö3 Austria Top 40)	21
Belgium (Ultratop 50 Flanders)	15
Belgium Dance (Ultratop Flanders)	5
Belgium (Ultratop 50 Wallonia)	10
Belgium Dance (Ultratop Wallonia)	7
Canada Hot 100 (Billboard)	38
Croatia (HRT)	75
Czech Republic Singles Digital (ČNS IFPI)	8
Denmark (Tracklisten)	20
Euro Digital Songs (Billboard)	5
Finland (Suomen virallinen lista)	8
France (SNEP)	119
Germany (GfK)	30
Germany Dance (Official German Charts)	3
Greece (IFPI)	25
Hungary (Rádiós Top 40)	10
Hungary (Single Top 40)	12
Hungary (Stream Top 40)	7
Ireland (IRMA)	15
Italy (FIMI)	49
Japan Hot 100 (Billboard)	39
Latvia (LAIPA)	12
Lithuania (AGATA)	11
Mexico Ingles Airplay (Billboard)	1
Netherlands (Dutch Top 40)	9
Netherlands (Mega Top 50)	15
Netherlands (Single Top 100)	16
New Zealand (Recorded Music NZ)	32
Norway (VG-lista)	6
Poland Airplay (ZPAV)	44
Portugal (AFP)	44
San Marino (SMRRTV Top 50)	5
Scotland Singles (OCC)	10
Slovakia Airplay (ČNS IFPI)	21
Slovakia Singles Digital (ČNS IFPI)	7
Slovenia (SloTop50)	20
Spain (Promusicae)	78
Sweden (Sverigetopplistan)	2
Switzerland (Schweizer Hitparade)	11
UK Singles (OCC)	20
US Billboard Hot 100	83
US Dance Club Songs (Billboard)	50
US Hot Dance/Electronic Songs (Billboard)	4

=== Year-end charts ===
Chart (2019)	Position
Belgium (Ultratop Flanders)	57
Belgium (Ultratop Wallonia)	59
Hungary (Rádiós Top 40)	48
Netherlands (Dutch Top 40)	52
Sweden (Sverigetopplistan)	74
Tokyo (Tokio Hot 100)	45
US Hot Dance/Electronic Songs (Billboard)	30

== Certifications ==
Region	Certification	Certified units/sales
Brazil (Pro-Música Brasil)	3× Platinum	120,000^{‡}
Denmark (IFPI Danmark)	Gold	45,000^{‡}
France (SNEP)	Gold	100,000^{‡}
Italy (FIMI)	Platinum	70,000^{‡}
New Zealand (RMNZ)	Gold	15,000^{‡}
Portugal (AFP)	Gold	5,000^{‡}
Spain (Promusicae)	Gold	30,000^{‡}
United Kingdom (BPI)	Gold	400,000^{‡}
United States (RIAA)	Gold	500,000^{‡}
^{‡} Sales+streaming figures based on certification alone.
