= Morten Breum =

Danish DJ and music producer (born 1982)

Morten
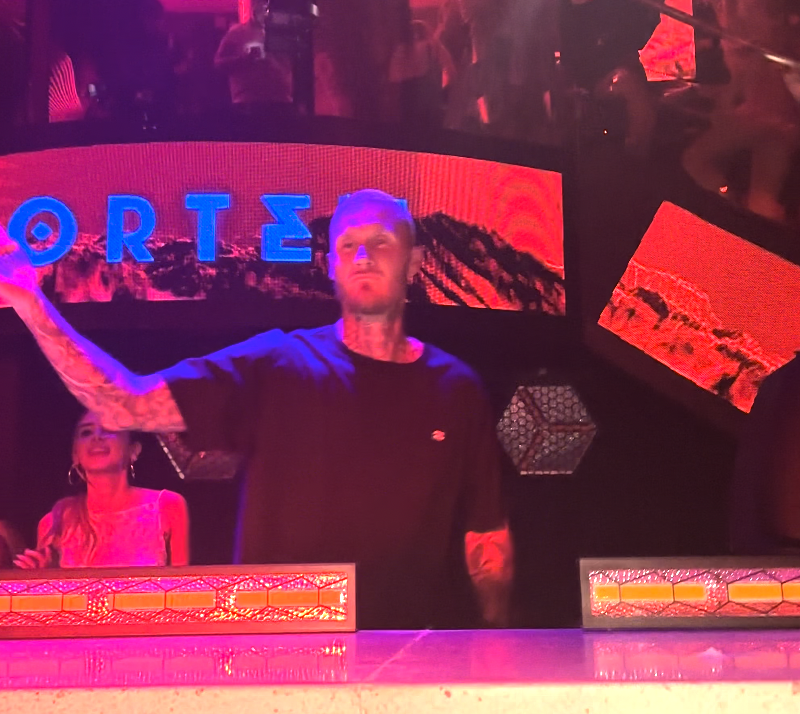
- Morten at LIV Miami in 2025

Background information
- Born: Morten Breum; 26 May 1982 (age 44); Denmark
- Origin: Aarhus, Denmark
- Genres: House, electro, Future Rave
- Occupations: Disc jockey, record producer
- Years active: 2008–present
- Labels: Armada; Dim Mak; disco:wax; Monstercat; Musical Freedom; Insomniac; PRMD; Spinnin'; Thrive; Warner

Morten Breum (Danish pronunciation: [ˈmɒːtn̩ b̥ʁœwm]; born 26 May 1982), known mononymously as Morten, is a Danish DJ and record producer. He is known for developing and creating the sound and style known as “future rave”, together with David Guetta.

His professional music career started with his very own first track "Højere Vildere" with Rune RK, featuring the Danish duo Nik & Jay in 2008, but his track "Domestic" in 2010 was his breakthrough track, reaching No. 3 on the Danish Singles Chart. In 2009, he released his album Drop!, followed by Nightclub Session in 2010. With a string of releases since then, Morten has explored the genre of "future rave".

== Biography ==
Morten has played festivals around the world solo and in collaboration with French DJ and producer David Guetta. The two close friends coined the future rave genre, releasing a four-track collaborative EP in 2020 titled New Rave. Morten has gathered an audience of 4.7 million monthly listeners on Spotify. In 2021, Morten entered the DJ Mag Top 100 as the highest new entry at number 39, and landed at number 20 on the 1001Tracklists ranking. In 2022, his music video for "Dreams" with David Guetta featuring Lanie Garnder won Best Highlight Video at Clubbing TV's Music Video Awards. In 2022 he played the mainstage at EDC Las Vegas and Tomorrowland, as well as a residency in Ibiza with Guetta.

Morten has performed at some of the biggest festivals worldwide including Ultra Music Festival, EDC Las Vegas, Sunset Music Festival, Tomorrowland, Creamfields, and EDC Orlando.

== Future rave ==
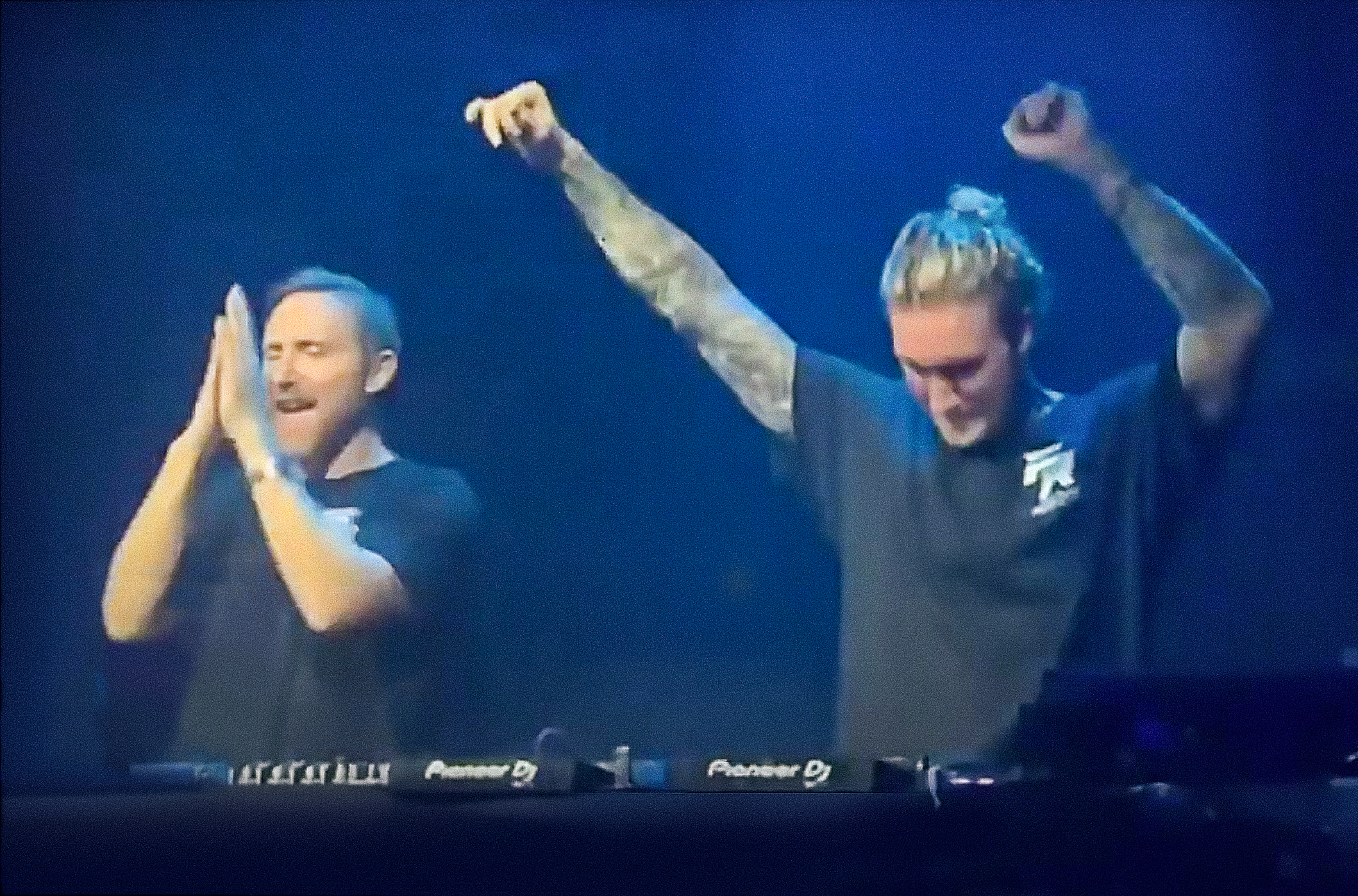
Morten (right) together with David Guetta (left) at Hï Ibiza in 2022

Since 2019, David Guetta and Morten have explored a dance music sound known as "future rave". Emerging from their desire to play something new in their sets, the duo intends to bring the elements of both the EDM and underground scenes together, combining the energy and the hooks of EDM, the futuristic sounds of techno, and the emotion of trance and (future) house.

David Guetta commented on their collaboration in a Billboard interview: "Morten came with this sound, and it's so hard to find a new sound. Then I have more experience in making chords and melodies and structuring records, so it's been really interesting to be able to kind of complete each other. I think what we're doing doesn't sound like anyone else. It's really fresh and new and I'm so excited about it. DJs I play it for are excited about it too. I haven't been excited about dance music like this for a long time."

In 2022, the pair went on a US tour including a set at EDC under the title Future Rave.

== Hï Ibiza Future Rave residency ==
On 8 April 2022, David Guetta and Morten announced that they would have an 18-week residency at the club Hï Ibiza on the island of Ibiza in mid-2022.

== Rankings and awards ==
- 2021 – No. 39 on DJ Mag Top 100
- 2021 – No. 20 on 1001Tracklists Top 101 DJs
- 2021 – ClubbingTV Best Highlight Music Video for "Dreams" with David Guetta
- 2022 – No. 28 on 1001Tracklists Top 101 DJs

== Discography ==
=== Albums ===
- Drop! (2009)
- Nightclub Session (2010)

=== Extended plays ===
- New Rave with David Guetta (2020)

=== Singles ===
Year	Single	Peak position	Certification	Album
Year	Single	DEN	Certification	Album
2008	"Højere Vildere (Skru op for den bitch)" (with Rune RK featuring Nik & Jay)	—		Non-album single
2010	"Heads Up!"	—		Drop!
2010	"Domestic" (featuring Nik & Jay)	3	IFPI DEN: Gold	Drop!
2010	"Hamra"	—		Drop!
2010	"I Like It" (featuring Camille Jones)	25		Drop!
2010	"On It!"	—		Drop!
2010	"Moist"	34		Drop!
2010	"Every Time (You Look at Me)" (featuring Sisse Marie)	1	IFPI DEN: Gold	Non-album singles
2010	"Welding Love (Morten Remix)" (with Filur featuring Daniel August)	—		Non-album singles
2010	"Waterline (Morten Remix)" (with Dizzy Mizz Lizzy)	—		Non-album singles
2010	"Regardless (Morten Remix)" (with J.O. & Klaur Christensen)	—		Non-album singles
2011	"Famous" (featuring Joachim S)	34		Non-album singles
2011	"Never Surrender" (featuring Jay Colin)	19		Non-album singles
2011	"6 AM"	15		Non-album singles
2012	"Ingen Anden Drøm" (vs. Pegboard Nerds)	26		Non-album singles
2012	"Larva (Far Away)"	12		Non-album singles
2012	"Forever (Morten Remix)" (with Medina)	—		Non-album singles
2013	"Look Closer" (featuring Paul Aiden)	19		Non-album singles
2013	"Taken Over (Morten Remix)" (with Rebecca & Fiona)	—		Non-album singles
2013	"Hello (Morten Remix)" (with Stafford Brothers featuring Lil Wayne & Christina Milian)	—		Non-album singles
2013	"Ran for My Life (Morten Remix)" (with Guinevere)	—		Non-album singles
2014	"Perfect Dive"	—		Non-album singles
2014	"Pulsing (Morten Remix)" (with Thomas Barfod featuring Nina K.)	—		Non-album singles
2015	"Himalaya"	—		Non-album singles
2015	"Ukali"	—		Non-album singles
2015	"Stickup" (with Karma Fields featuring Juliette Lewis)	—		Non-album singles
2015	"Hello (Morten Remix)" (with Adele)	—		Non-album singles
2015	"What I Did for Love (Morten Remix)" (with David Guetta featuring Emeli Sandé)	—		Non-album singles
2016	"Beautiful Heartbeat (Morten Remix)" (featuring Frida Sundemo)	—		Non-album singles
2016	"Body Down (Inspector Gadget)"	—		Non-album singles
2016	"Fiyaa"	—		Non-album singles
2016	"Kids" (with Steve Aoki)	—		4OKI
2016	"Love" (featuring Mr. Vegas)	—		Non-album singles
2016	"Certified" (with twoloud)	—		Non-album singles
2016	"Sharpest Weapon" (with tyDi featuring Cameron Walker)	—		Non-album singles
2016	"Bomb a Drop (Morten Remix)" (with Garmiani)	—		Non-album singles
2017	"Coffee Can Money" (with Borgeous featuring Runaground)	—		Non-album singles
2017	"TTFU" (with Riggi & Piros)	—		Non-album singles
2017	"Hypnotized"	—		Non-album singles
2017	"Hold Up" (with Borgeous)	—		Non-album singles
2017	"Keep Me from You" (featuring ODA)	—		Non-album singles
2017	"China White"	—		Non-album singles
2017	"Ride Around" (featuring Conor Darvid)	—		Non-album singles
2017	"2U (Morten Remix)" (with David Guetta & Justin Bieber)	—		Non-album singles
2018	"Family" (featuring Dave East)	—		Non-album singles
2018	"Baíle De Favela"	—		Non-album singles
2019	"Me & You"	—		Non-album singles
2019	"Never Be Alone" (with David Guetta featuring Aloe Blacc)	—		Non-album singles
2019	"Magnolia" (with Nik & Jay)	18	IFPI DEN: Platinum	Non-album singles
2019	"Make It to Heaven" (with David Guetta featuring Raye)	—		Non-album singles
2019	"Heaven (David Guetta & Morten Remix)" (with Avicii)	—		Non-album singles
2020	"Polar"	—		Non-album singles
2020	"Detroit 3 AM" (with David Guetta)	—		Non-album singles
2020	"Kill Me Slow" (with David Guetta)	—		New Rave
2020	"Save My Life" (with David Guetta featuring Lovespeake)	—		Non-album singles
2020	"Dreams" (with David Guetta featuring Lanie Gardner)	—		Non-album singles
2020	"Let's Love (David Guetta & Morten Future Rave Remix)" (with David Guetta featuring Sia)	—		Non-album singles
2021	"Impossible" (with David Guetta featuring John Martin)	—		Non-album singles
2021	"Alive Again" (with David Guetta & Roland Clark)	—		Non-album singles
2021	"Titanium (David Guetta and Morten Remix)" (with David Guetta featuring Sia)	—		Non-album singles
2022	"Permanence" (with David Guetta)	—		Non-album singles
2022	"No Good"	—		Non-album singles
2022	"You Can't Change Me" (with David Guetta featuring Raye)	—		Future Rave
2023	"Lost in the Rhythm" (with David Guetta)	—		
2024	"The Future Is Now" (with David Guetta)	—		
2026	"Serotonin" (with KREAM)	_		
"—" denotes a recording that did not chart or was not released.

As featured artist

Year	Single	Peak position	Album
Year	Single	DEN	Album
2011	"Banger til min banger" (Joey Moe featuring Morten Breum)	36	Fuldmåne (album by Joey Moe)

=== Free downloads ===
- "Ballet Only" (2012)
- "Liquids" (2011)
- "Wreck" (2014)

=== Remixes ===
- 2008: Højere Vildere (Skru Op For Den Bitch) (MORTEN Radio Edit)
- 2015: Adele — "Hello" (MORTEN Remix)
- 2015: MORTEN - Himalaya (MORTEN & Big N Slim Rework) [Armada Trice]
- 2019: Avicii — "Heaven" (David Guetta and MORTEN Remix)
- 2020: David Guetta — "Let's Love" (David Guetta and MORTEN Future Rave Remix)
- 2021: David Guetta featuring Sia - "Titanium" (David Guetta and MORTEN Future Rave Remix)
