= Nexus Music =

- Founded: 2002
- Founder: Jon & Jules
- Genre: Hip hop, R&B, pop
- Country of origin: Denmark
- Official website: nexusmusic.com

Nexus Music is a Danish record label and production company that was founded in 2002 by producers Jon & Jules (Jon Andersson Ørom and Johannes Jules Wolfson).

With more than 20 number 1s and more than 150 gold and platinum certifications, Nexus Music has become one of Denmark's most famous and best-selling production and record companies. The label has signed prominent artists like Nik & Jay, Alex, Ankerstjerne, Sisse Marie, Cisilia and Joey Moe. Nexus' artists has received numerous awards and certifications.

Nexus hold several remarkable records in the Danish music industry. They have signed and produced the best selling pop group of all time in Denmark (Nik & Jay), produced Denmark's biggest club hit of all time, "Yo-Yo" by Joey Moe, and signed and produced, Cisilia, the youngest winner ever of the Danish Music Awards (i.e. Danish Grammy) for Hit of the Year and Best New Artist.

This is a list of songs written and produced by the production team Nexus.

== Singles ==
Year	Artist	Title	Peak chart position	Certification
2001	Christian Brøns	Du Kan Gøre Hvad Du Vil (remix)	1	2× platinum
2002	Nik & Jay	Nik & Jay	2	Platinum
2002	Nik & Jay	Hot!	1	Platinum
2002	Nik & Jay	Elsker Hende Mere	5	Gold
2002	Blå Øjne	Fiskene i Havet	-	-
2002	Jon	Right Here Next To You (remix)	1	2× platinum
2003	Alex	Them Girls	2	Gold
2004	Dharni	Girl Talk	-	Gold (SWE)
2004	Nik & Jay	En Dag Tilbage	-	Platinum
2004	Nik & Jay	Lækker	1	Platinum
2004	Nik & Jay	Kan Du Høre Hende Synge	-	Gold
2004	Nik & Jay	Strip	1	-
2006	Nik & Jay	Boing!	2	5× platinum
2006	Nik & Jay	Når et Lys Slukkes	2	Gold
2006	Joey Moe	Flip It (Like a DJ)	12	-
2006	Joey Moe	My Last Serenade	-	-
2007	Nik & Jay	I Love Ya	3	Gold
2007	Nik & Jay	Et Sidste Kys	2	Platinum
2007	Emilia	Var Minut	2 (SWE)	-
2007	Alex	Hvad Nu Hvis?	1	2× platinum
2008	Nik & Jay	Kommer Igen	1	Platinum
2009	Nik & Jay	Endnu En	2	Platinum
2009	Joey Moe	Yo-Yo	3	Platinum
2009	Joey Moe	Jorden Er Giftig	11	Gold
2010	Morten Breum	Domestic	3	Gold
2010	Burhan G	Tættere På Himlen	1	Platinum
2010	Morten Breum	Fest	2	Platinum
2010	Sisse Marie	Every Time	1	Gold
2011	Burhan G	Søvnløs	4	Platinum
2011	Nik & Jay	Mod Solnedgangen	1	2× platinum
2011	Nik & Jay	Gi' Mig Dine Tanker	6	Platinum
2011	Nik & Jay	Udødelige	7	Gold
2011	Clemens	Byen Sover	3	Gold
2011	Erik & Kriss	Lighter	6 (NO)	Platinum
2011	Erik & Kriss	My City	15 (NO)	Platinum
2011	Joey Moe	Du' En Ener	27	Platinum
2012	Nik & Jay	Vi Vandt i Dag (feat. Landsholdet)	2	Platinum
2012	Clemens	Ingen Kender Dagen	12	Platinum
2012	Joey Moe	Gi' Mig	1	Platinum
2012	Clemens	Tog Det Som En Mand (feat. Nastasia)	12	2× Platinum
2012	Joey Moe & Nik & Jay	Tænder En Ild	28	Gold
2013	Nik & Jay	United (feat. Lisa Rowe)	1	3× Platinum
2013	Nik & Jay	Ocean of You (feat. Søren Huss)	6	Platinum
2013	Nik & Jay	#pæntnejtak	4	Platinum
2013	Nik & Jay	Clappin'	-	Gold
2014	Nik & Jay	Forstadsdrømme	5	Platinum
2014	Nik & Jay	Novembervej	10	Platinum
2015	Cisilia	Vi To Datid Nu	4	2× Platinum
2015	Cisilia	Luftballon	21	Gold
2016	Kongsted & Cisilia	Wild Child	14	Platinum
2016	TopGunn	Længe Siden	11	Gold
2017	TopGunn	Hyggesang	16	Platinum
2018	Cisilia	Kold December (feat. hasan shah)	17	Gold
2018	Skinz	Jaloux	39	Gold
2018	Citybois	Helt Fair (feat. ICEKIID)	28	Gold
2019	TopGunn	Nik & Jay (feat. Benjamin Hav)	8	Platinum
2019	TopGunn	Detaljen	12	Gold
2019	TopGunn	Hyg Hver Dag	14	Gold
2019	ICEKIID	Øjne På Mig (feat. Kesi)	-	Gold

== Albums ==
Year	Artist	Title	Peak chart position	Certification
2002	Nik & Jay	Nik & Jay	2	6× platinum
2003	Alex	13	10	Gold
2004	Nik & Jay	2	1	7× platinum
2006	Nik & Jay	3: Fresh, Fri, Fly	1	3× platinum
2006	Joey Moe	MoeTown	12	-
2008	Nik & Jay	De Største	1	6× platinum
2010	Joey Moe	Grib Natten	20	-
2011	Nik & Jay	Engle Eller Dæmoner	1	3× platinum
2011	Joey Moe	Fuldmåne	4	Platinum
2012	Joey Moe	Midnat	3	Gold
2013	Nik & Jay	Copenhagen Pop Cartel	-	Gold
2013	Nik & Jay	United	2	2× Platinum
2015	Cisilia	Unge Øjne	1	Platinum

== Non-single tracks ==
Songs contributed to albums not mentioned above:

Year	Artist	Song	Album	Peak chart position	Certification
2002	Blå Øjne	Alle Øjne Kigger På Dig Nu	Tæt På	15	Gold
2007	Emilia	Lär Mig Att Älska	Små Ord Av Kärlek	22 (SWE)	-
2009	J. Holiday	Forever Ain't Enough	Round 2	4 (USA)	-
2010	Burhan G	Kryptonit	Burhan G	5	7× platinum
2010	Burhan G	I stedet for dig	Burhan G	5	7× platinum

== See also ==
- Clemens
- Erik & Kriss
- Burhan G
- J. Holiday
- Morten Breum
- Christian Brøns
