= Nik & Jay =

Danish hip-hop/pop duo

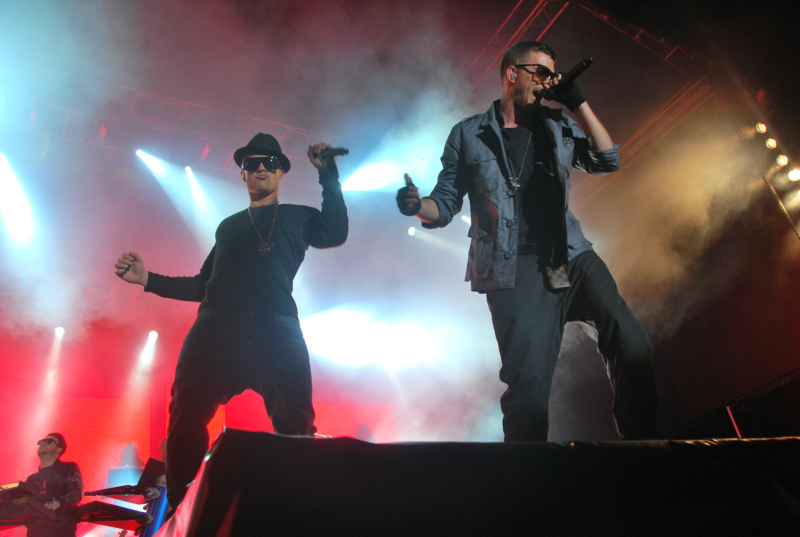
- Nik & Jay in July 2010. (Photo: Lars Schmidt)

Background information
- Origin: Værløse, Denmark
- Genres: Hip hop; R&B; pop
- Years active: 2002–present
- Label: Nexus Music
- Members: Niclas Genckel Petersen; Jannik Brandt Thomsen
- Website: nikogjay.dk

Nik & Jay is a Danish hip-hop/pop duo made of Niclas Genckel Petersen (born 8 November 1980 in Herlev) and Jannik Brandt Thomsen (born 16 June 1981).

Their #2 single "Hot!" won them Hit of the Year and Best New Artist at the Danish Music Awards in 2003. Other hits have included "En Dag Tilbage" (One Day Left), "Lækker" (Hot), "Kan Du Høre Hende Synge?" (Can you hear her sing?) and "Boing!".

They released a CD and DVD of their concert tour from 2003.

The single "Boing!" and the album, 3: Fresh - Fri - Fly earned them even more success with a larger variety of ages among the fans.

Nik and Jay played soccer together in Værløse, Denmark during their youth. Nik sang in a punk band and rollerbladed while Jay was a prominent skateboarder. They began to party together then eventually began to produce music.

== Discography ==
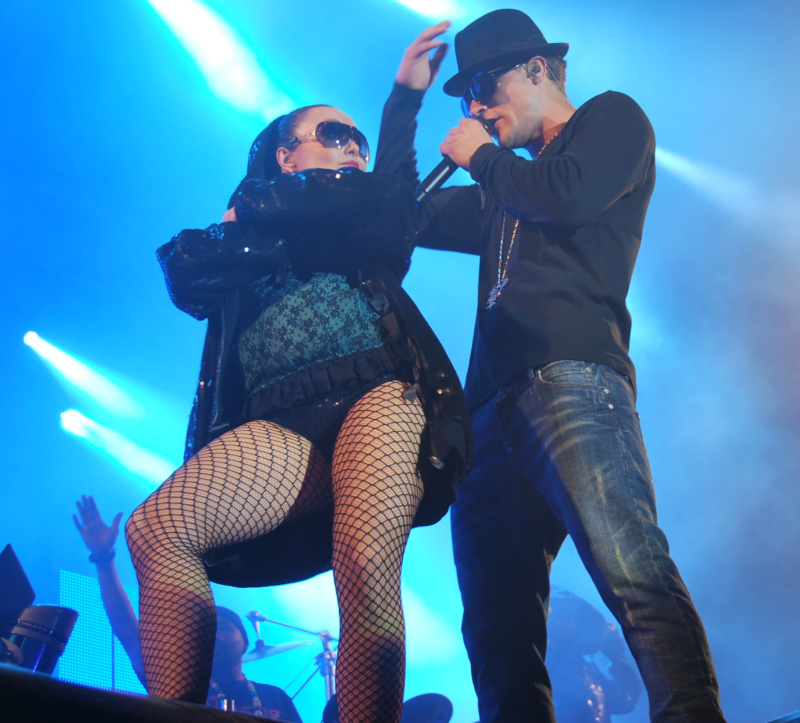
Niclas Petersen and a dancer, July 2010. (Photo: Lars Schmidt)

=== Albums ===
==== Studio albums ====
| Title | Album details | Peak chart positions | Certifications |
| Title | Album details | DEN | Certifications |
|---|---|---|---|
| Nik & Jay | Released: 2002; Label: Nexus Music/EMI/Medley | 2 | IFPI DEN: 8× Platinum |
| 2 | Released: April 26, 2004; Label: Nexus Music/Medley | 1 | IFPI DEN: 8× Platinum |
| 3: Fresh, Fri, Fly | Released: September 25, 2006; Label: Nexus Music | 2 | IFPI DEN: 7× Platinum |
| Engle eller dæmoner | Released: January 25, 2012; Label: Copenhagen/Universal Music | 1 | IFPI DEN: 3× Platinum |
| United | Released: October 28, 2013; Label: Copenhagen/Universal Music | 2 | IFPI DEN: 3× Platinum |
| Længe leve drømmene | Released: December 1, 2019; Label: Copenhagen/Universal Music | 2 | IFPI DEN: Platinum |

==== Compilation albums ====
| Title | Album details | Peak chart positions | Certifications |
| Title | Album details | DEN | Certifications |
|---|---|---|---|
| De Største | Released: 2008; Format: 2xCD + DVD | 1 | IFPI DEN: 2× Platinum |
| De første fra Nik & Jay | Released: 2008 | — | IFPI DEN: Platinum |

==== Live albums ====
| Title | Album details |
|---|---|
| Det vi gør | Released: 2003; Format: DVD |

==== Extended plays ====
| Title | EP details |
|---|---|
| Copenhagen Pop Cartel | Released: March 8, 2013; Label: Copenhagen/Universal Music |

=== Singles ===
==== As main artist ====
| Title | Year | Peak position | Certifications | Album |
| Title | Year | DEN | Certifications | Album |
|---|---|---|---|---|
| "Nik & Jay" | 2002 | 3 | | Nik & Jay |
| "Hot!" | 2002 | — | IFPI DEN: 3× Platinum | Nik & Jay |
| "Elsker hende mere" | 2003 | — | IFPI DEN: Gold | Nik & Jay |
| "Ta' mig tilbage" | 2003 | — | | Nik & Jay |
| "Pop-pop!" | 2004 | — | | 2 |
| "En dag tilbage" | 2004 | — | IFPI DEN: Platinum | 2 |
| "Lækker" | 2004 | — | IFPI DEN: Platinum | 2 |
| "Kan du høre hende synge" | 2005 | — | IFPI DEN: Gold | 2 |
| "Strip" | 2005 | — | IFPI DEN: Gold | 2 |
| "Boing!" | 2006 | 2 | IFPI DEN: 3× Platinum | 3: Fresh, Fri, Fly |
| "Når et lys slukkes" | 2006 | 4 | IFPI DEN: Platinum | 3: Fresh, Fri, Fly |
| "I Love Ya" | 2006 | 8 | IFPI DEN: Platinum | 3: Fresh, Fri, Fly |
| "Et sidste kys" | 2007 | 2 | IFPI DEN: Platinum | 3: Fresh, Fri, Fly |
| "Op på hesten" | 2007 | — | | 3: Fresh, Fri, Fly |
| "Kommer igen!" | 2008 | 1 | IFPI DEN: Platinum | De største |
| "Endnu en" | 2008 | 2 | IFPI DEN: Platinum | De største |
| "Mod solnedgangen" | 2011 | 1 | IFPI DEN: 2× Platinum | Engle eller dæmoner |
| "Gi' mig dine tanker" | 2011 | 6 | IFPI DEN: Platinum | Engle eller dæmoner |
| "Udødelige" | 2011 | 7 | IFPI DEN: Gold | Engle eller dæmoner |
| "Mit hjerte" | 2012 | — | | Engle eller dæmoner |
| "Vi vandt i dag" (feat. Landsholdet) | 2012 | 2 | IFPI DEN: Platinum | Non-album single |
| "United" (feat. Lisa Rowe) | 2013 | 1 | IFPI DEN: 3× Platinum | Copenhagen Pop Cartel (EP) |
| "Clappin'" | 2013 | 20 | | Copenhagen Pop Cartel (EP) |
| "Ocean of You" (feat. Søren Huss) | 2013 | 6 | IFPI DEN: Platinum | Copenhagen Pop Cartel (EP) |
| "#pæntnejtak" | 2013 | 4 | IFPI DEN: Gold | United |
| "Forstadsdrømme" | 2013 | 5 | IFPI DEN: Platinum | United |
| "Novembervej" | 2013 | 20 | IFPI DEN: 3× Platinum | United |
| "Stop! Dans!" | 2013 | 35 | | United |
| "De vigtigste skridt" (feat. Kristian Leth) | 2014 | 27 | | United |
| "Magisk" | 2016 | 20 | IFPI DEN: Platinum | Længe leve drømmene |
| "Skytsengel | 2016 | 34 | | Længe leve drømmene |
| "Hele vejen" | 2017 | 13 | IFPI DEN: Platinum | Længe leve drømmene |
| "Linje H" | 2017 | 12 | IFPI DEN: Platinum | Længe leve drømmene |
| "Længe leve drømmene" | 2019 | 40 | | Længe leve drømmene |
| "Det' den vibe" | 2019 | 28 | | Længe leve drømmene |
| "Hot Sauce" | 2019 | 39 | | Længe leve drømmene |
| "Magnolia" (with Morten) | 2019 | 18 | IFPI DEN: Platinum | Længe leve drømmene |
| "Dagslys" | 2022 | 27 | | Non-album singles |
| "KBH" | 2026 | 10 | | Non-album singles |
"—" denotes items which were not released in that country or failed to chart.

==== As guest artist ====
| Title | Year | Peak position | Certifications | Album |
| Title | Year | DEN | Certifications | Album |
|---|---|---|---|---|
| "Girl Talk" (Dhani featuring Nik & Jay) | 2004 | — | | Non-album single |
| "Hvad nu hvis?" (Alex feat. Nik & Jay) | 2007 | 1 | IFPI DEN: Platinum | Non-album single |
| "Højere vildere (Skru op for den bitch)" (Rune RK and Morten Breum feat. Nik & Jay) | 2008 | — | | Non-album single |
| "Domestic" (Morten Breum feat. Nik & Jay) | 2009 | 3 | IFPI DEN: Gold | Drop! |
| "Tættere på himlen" (Burhan G feat. Nik & Jay) | 2010 | 1 | IFPI DEN: 2× Platinum | Burhan G |
| "My City" (Erik & Kriss with Nik & Jay) | 2011 | — | | Non-album single |
| "Tænder en ild" (Joey Moe feat. Nik & Jay) | 2012 | 28 | | Midnat |
| "You're My Fire" (Carpark North feat. Nik & Jay) | 2014 | 22 | | Phoenix |
"—" denotes items which were not released in that country or failed to chart.

Appearances

- 2005: "Hvor små vi er (as part of charity Giv til Asien) (#1)

=== DVDs ===
- 2003: "Det Vi Gør" (DVD)
- 2008: "De største"

== Awards ==
- Best Danish Act for the NRJ Radio Awards 2003.
- They were nominated for Best Danish Act at EMA06
- In 2005 they won Best Danish Artist at the Nordic Music Awards.
- They have won the People's Choice Award at the Danish DeeJay Awards for years 2003, 2005, 2006 and 2007.
