= Joey Moe =

Danish singer

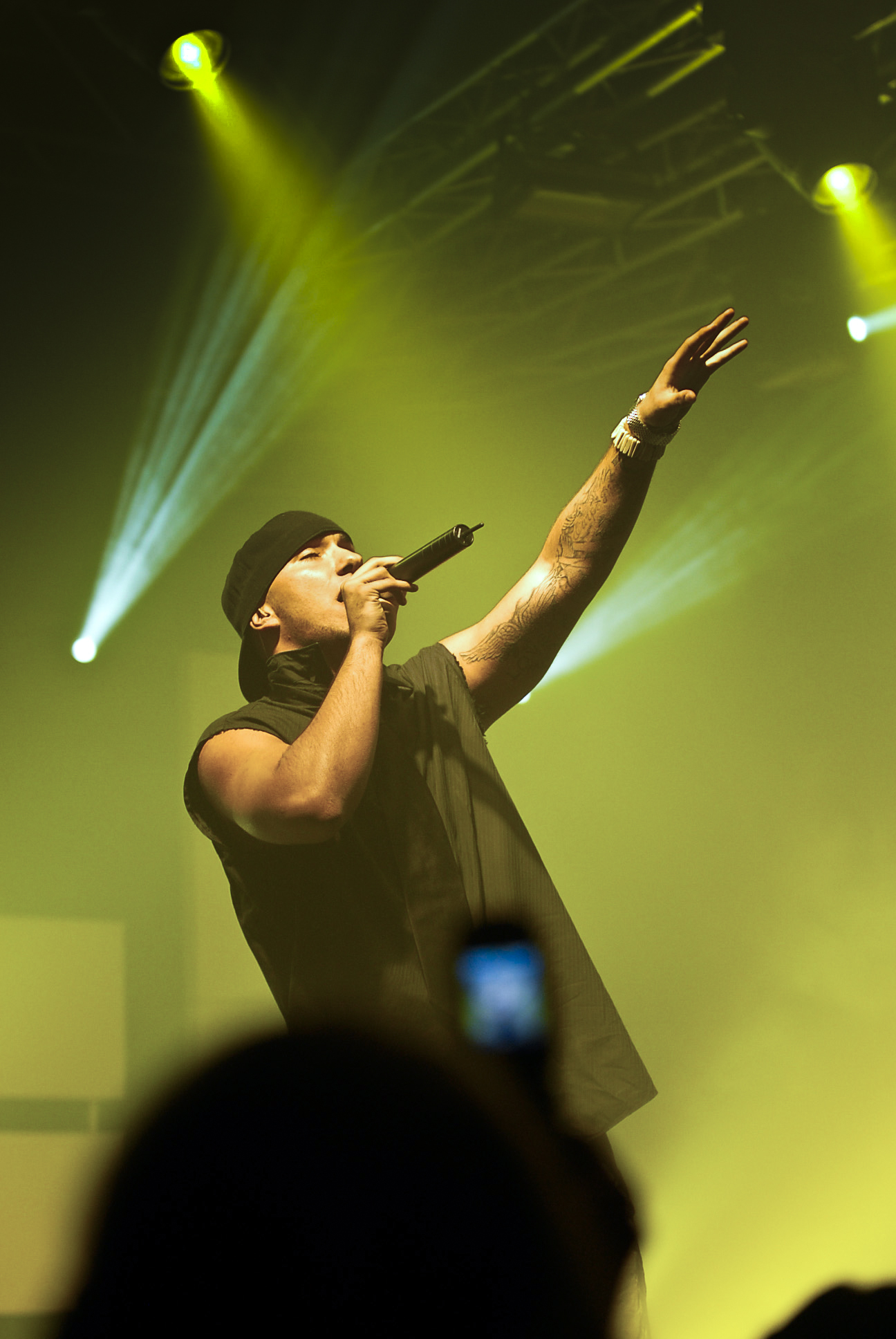
- Moe in 2007

Background information
- Birth name: Joey Lanni Moe Lynghave
- Born: 8 June 1985 (age 40); Copenhagen, Denmark
- Genres: R&B; pop; hip hop
- Occupations: Singer; record producer
- Instrument: Vocals
- Years active: 1996–present
- Labels: Nexus Music
- Website: joeymoe.dk

Joey Lanni Moe Lynghave (born 8 June 1985) is a Danish singer and producer. During his career, he has collaborated with a number of other Danish artists.

== Career ==
Joey Moe graduated from Sankt Annae Gymnasium (high school) in 2004. In 1996, when he was only 10, he formed a boy band named Nothing Special with Theis Keller who later on became part of another Danish boy band, Fu:el, that took part in a Danish Popstar competition in 2003.

After the dissolution of Nothing Special, Moe continued with music, particularly alongside rapper Jinks, both eventually joining the Nexus Music record label owned by producers Jon & Jules and Nik & Jay.

In 2009, he released a major dance single, "Yo-Yo", that reached No. 3 on the official Danish Singles Chart. The song also topped the dance charts for many months, receiving platinum status. He also received the Voice Prisen '09 award. In February 2010, he released internationally an English version of "Yo-Yo" on the record label Universal, which garnered airplay in Germany, Austria, Poland, Switzerland and Sweden.

He has also written for Basim on the single "Befri dig selv" and for Nicolai on the songs "Når du danser for mig" and "Du er en stjerne".

== Discography ==
Moe in 2021

Studio albums

- 2006: MoeTown
- 2010: Grib natten
- 2011: Fuldmåne
- 2012: Fuldmåne 2.0
- 2012: Midnat
- 2013: Aurora
- 2014: Joey
- 2017: Klarsyn

=== Appearances ===
- 2007: "If I Want To" on Rich Kids film soundtrack
- 2009: Gaza song – Sænke Slagskibe (charity)
- 2009: Nexus Xtra Vol. 1 (mixtape with materials from Nik & Jay, Joey Moe and Jinks)
