= Addition Financial Arena =

Indoor arena in Orlando, Florida, US

- "The Dungeon"

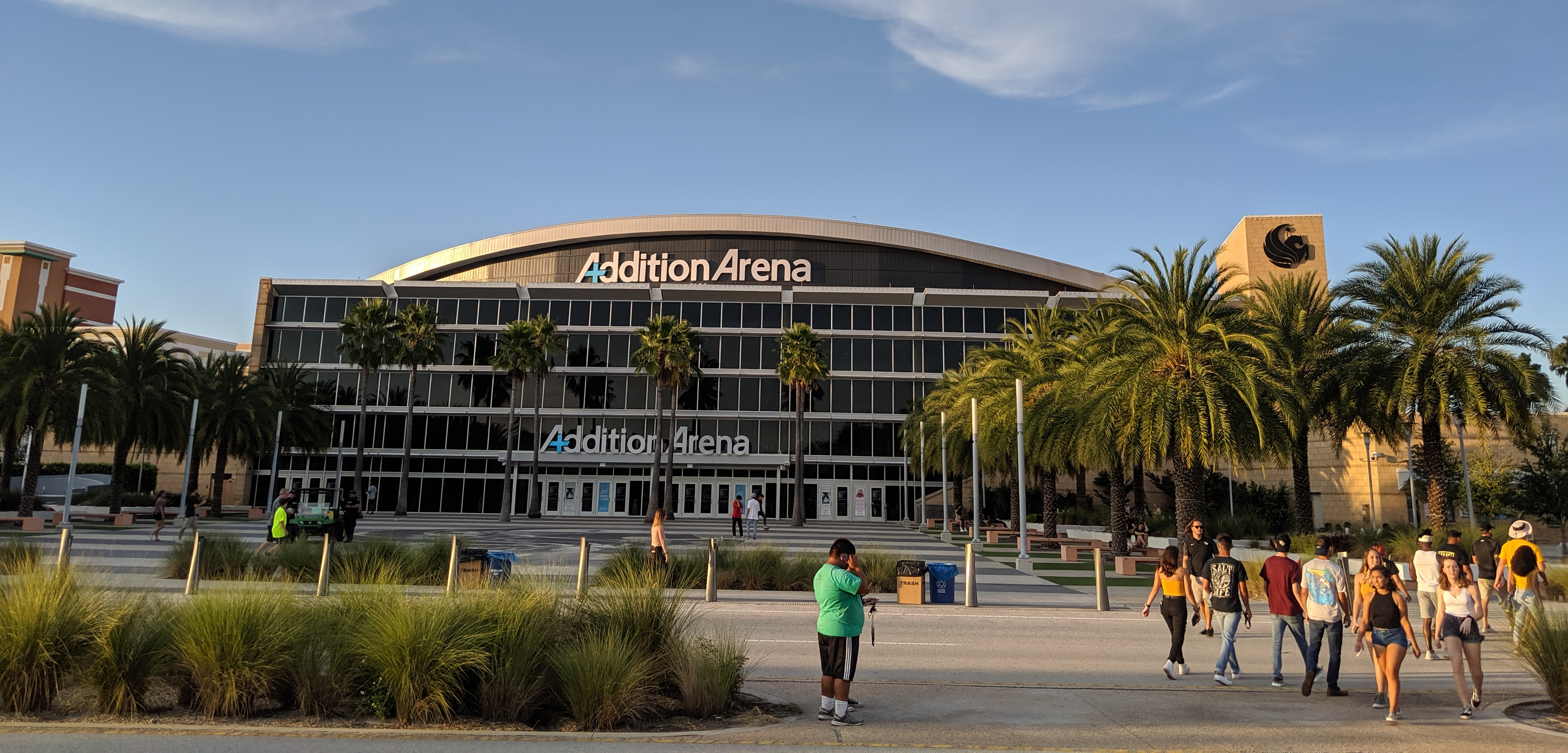
- Interactive map of Addition Financial Arena
- Former names: CFE Arena (2013–2019); UCF Arena (2007–2013); UCF Convocation Center (planning/construction)
- Address: 12777 Gemini Blvd N
- Location: Orlando, Florida, U.S.
- Coordinates: 28.6068°N 81.1976°W
- Owner: University of Central Florida
- Operator: Spectra Experiences
- Capacity: Sports; MMA/boxing: 10,000; Basketball: 9,432; Arena football: 8,803 Concerts: General admission: 8,067; Half House: 5,195; End Stage 180: 7,919; End Stage 220: 8,483; End Stage 270: 9,322; End Stage 360: 9,830
- Surface: Multi-surface
- Public transit: UCF Transit Center,

Construction
- Groundbreaking: 2006
- Opened: September 8, 2007
- Cost: $107 million ($171 million in 2025 dollars)
- Architect: HOK Sport Venue Event
- Structural engineers: Bliss & Nyitray, Inc.
- Services engineers: Smith Seckman Reid, Inc.
- General contractor: KUD International

Tenants
- UCF Knights (NCAA) (2007–present); Orlando Valkyries (PVF/MLV) (2024–present); Central Florida Crusaders (NISL) (2022–2024); Orlando Predators (AFL) (2014); Orlando Fantasy (LFL) (2010)

Website
- additionfiarena.com

Addition Financial Arena (formerly known as CFE Arena and UCF Arena) is a sports and entertainment arena located near Orlando in Orange County, Florida, United States, on the main campus of the University of Central Florida. The arena is owned by the university, and is managed by Oak View Group. It was constructed beginning in 2006 as a replacement for the original UCF arena, and as a part of Knights Plaza. The arena is home to the UCF Knights men's and women's basketball teams. The arena also hosted the annual Science Olympiad in 2012 and 2014.

The arena is 252,000 square feet (23,000 m^{2}) and boasts a capacity of over 9,400 for basketball, and has 17 luxury suites. As of January 2022, the attendance record for the arena is 10,011, its first and only ever sellout crowd, for a March 22, 2017 NIT Quarterfinals matchup with the Illinois Fighting Illini. The arena can be configured for concerts, family events, musical theatre, commencements, and other stage shows and sporting events. Local high schools often host graduations at the arena. One of UCF's biggest events, Knight-Thon, is also held at the arena. The fundraiser is a dance marathon which raises money for Children's Miracle Network.

== Original arena ==
The arena was originally built in 1991 with a capacity of 5,100. It was home to men's basketball, women's basketball, and volleyball, and was also used for events such as concerts and commencements. It has hosted the Atlantic Sun Conference men's basketball tournament three times, in 1994, 1995, and 2002. The last basketball game played in the original facility was on March 3, 2007, when the UCF men's team beat the East Carolina Pirates, 77–64, in Conference USA play.

While basketball moved into the new arena, the men's and women's volleyball teams continue to play their regular-season games at the venue.

The venue's upper deck also serves as the men's and women's basketball teams' practice facility courts.

== History ==
Interior of the Addition Financial Arena, UCF's multi-purpose indoor sports arena

A new arena was built in 2007, as part of a larger project to create an athletic village known as Knights Plaza. The new arena, located in the space in front of the original arena, is double the seating capacity of its predecessor, including 7,479 fixed standard seats, 500 club seats, 1,328 retractable seats, 188 disabled seats, 16 luxury suites (seating capacity 192, total capacity 256), two-party suites (total capacity 60) and loge box seating for 64. According to the promoters' guide, the new arena has a basketball capacity of 9,465, and can hold up to 10,072 for concert events. The student section has been dubbed the "Knightmare."

The new arena was completed in September 2007 and is the home to both the men's and women's basketball teams. This expansion made the Addition Financial Arena the second largest arena complex in Orlando. Beginning in 2008, the grounds around arena hosted "Light Up UCF", a holiday celebration that features an outdoor ice skating rink. For the event, the arena is decorated with thousands of lights that are synchronized to holiday music.

In October 2008, the Addition Financial Arena was home to one of the largest presidential debate watch parties ever. On the front lawn of the arena, the debate was projected onto a large inflatable movie screen while a Lupe Fiasco concert was taking place inside the arena. The presidential debate, which was the final debate of the election, was then replayed for the thousands of attendees as they were leaving the concert. Lupe Fiasco acknowledged that the debate would be shown after the show, and encouraged the attendees to stay and watch it because of the significance of the election.

In 2010, the Legends Football League team Orlando Fantasy played at the arena. In 2014, it served as the home of the Orlando Predators of the Arena Football League.

On May 18–19, 2012, the arena hosted the opening and closing ceremonies of the 2012 Science Olympiad National Tournament.

In addition to its use as a basketball arena, the arena is regularly used to host other events on campus, including career fairs, graduation ceremonies, concerts, and public speakers. Addition Financial Arena has increasingly been used in recent years as an alternative to the much larger Kia Center in downtown Orlando.

Professional wrestling promotion All Elite Wrestling held an episode of their weekly television show AEW Dynamite at the arena on October 23, 2021. AEW would return to the arena to hold three shows in a three day span, March 4, 2022 to March 6, 2022. AEW held an episode of their other weekly show AEW Rampage, a fan fest, and then their PPV AEW Revolution In December 2024, AEW Worlds End was held at the arena.

=== Naming ===
UCF expressed interest numerous times in selling the naming rights to the arena. At one point, AirTran Airways was in negotiations to purchase naming rights, but no agreement was ever reached. On May 22, 2013, the UCF Board of Trustees officially announced that the school had entered into a naming rights contract with CFE Federal Credit Union, which has had a long-standing history with UCF. The deal was slated for seven years and was worth $3.95 million, or $564,285.72 per year. The new name took effect on May 23, 2013.

On May 1, 2019, CFE changed its name to Addition Financial. Coinciding with the change, the arena's name changed from CFE Arena to Addition Financial Arena on the same date. The arena's naming rights deal was not affected by the sponsor's name change.

On August 18, 2022, UCF announced that Addition Financial had extended their naming rights for the facility through 2034. The 12-year extension is worth $20 million.

== Events ==
The arena holds many different types of events every year. This includes graduation ceremonies, sports, award ceremonies, concerts, and more. In 2013, the arena hosted 356 events and served 394,121 attendees. The arena hosts the annual FIRST Robotics Competition Orlando Regional every year in March, one of the largest FIRST events outside of their World Finals event. It ranked fifth in university venues in the U.S. in 2014 in terms of gross ticket sales and attendance.

=== Entertainment ===
Addition Financial Arena has hosted concerts by high-profile musicians such as Lady Gaga, Katy Perry, Elton John, and Drake. The arena also served as the venue for the University of Central Florida's series of annual entertainment events for their students like the Homecoming Concert Knight, Comedy Knight, KnightFest or Pegasus Palooza.

Entertainment events held at Addition Financial Arena
| Date | Artist | Opening act(s) | Tour / concert name | Attendance | Revenue | Notes |
|---|---|---|---|---|---|---|
| September 8, 2007 | Reba McEntire | Melissa Peterman | —N/a | —N/a | —N/a | First show at the venue |
| November 1, 2007 | Fall Out Boy | Gym Class Heroes; Cute Is What We Aim For; Plain White T's | Young Wild Things Tour | —N/a | —N/a | |
| November 10, 2007 | Elton John | — | Rocket Man: Greatest Hits Live | 9,921 / 9,921 | —N/a | Venue's first sold-out show and largest concert attendance as of 2017 |
| February 23, 2008 | Michael Bublé | Naturally 7 | Call Me Irresponsible Tour | 8,897 / 8,897 | $582,636 | |
| March 28, 2008 | Avenged Sevenfold; Bullet for My Valentine; Atreyu; Blessthefall; Idiot Pilot | D'espairsRay; The Underneath; Mucc | Taste of Chaos Festival Tour 2008 | 7,765 / 7,765 | $284,805 | |
| April 29, 2008 | Santana | The Derek Trucks Band | Live Your Light Tour | 5,537 / 7,668 | $348,169 | |
| May 18, 2008 | Duran Duran | Your Vegas | The Red Carpet Massacre Tour | —N/a | —N/a | |
| October 18, 2008 | Dolly Parton | — | Backwoods Barbie Tour | —N/a | —N/a | |
| November 14, 2008 | Sarah Brightman | — | The Symphony World Tour | —N/a | —N/a | Fernando Lima and Mario Frangoulis were the special guests. |
| December 13, 2008 | Carrie Underwood | Little Big Town | Carnival Ride Tour | —N/a | —N/a | |
| January 24, 2009 | Alan Jackson; Zac Brown Band | — | —N/a | 5,553 / 6,608 | $308,655 | |
| February 18, 2009 | Slipknot | Coheed and Cambria; Trivium | All Hope Is Gone World Tour | —N/a | —N/a | |
| March 4, 2009 | Mötley Crüe | Hinder; Theory of a Deadman; The Last Vegas | Saints of Los Angeles Tour | —N/a | —N/a | |
| April 22, 2009 | Fall Out Boy | Cobra Starship; All Time Low; Metro Station; Hey Monday | Believers Never Die Tour Part Deux | —N/a | —N/a | |
| October 1, 2009 | The Killers | Chairlift | Day & Age World Tour | —N/a | —N/a | |
| January 3, 2010 | Lady Gaga | Jason Derulo; Semi Precious Weapons | The Monster Ball Tour | 6,753 / 6,785 | $283,886 | |
| April 21, 2010 | Drake | k-os Francis & The Lights | Campus Consciousness Tour | 7,947 / 8,000 | $79,735 | |
| August 28, 2010 | Ednita Nazario | — | Soy... El Concierto | 3,436 / 4,588 | $179,085 | |
| September 5, 2010 | Paramore | Tegan and Sara; New Found Glory; Kadawatha | Honda Civic Tour | 7,300 / 8,002 | $199,564 | |
| October 10, 2010 | Bob Dylan | — | Never Ending Tour 2010 | 3,441 / 6,525 | $147,014 | |
| March 5, 2011 | Kid Rock | — | Born Free Tour | —N/a | —N/a | |
| April 20, 2011 | Wiz Khalifa | Mac Miller | Campus Consciousness Green Carpet Tour | —N/a | —N/a | |
| May 22, 2011 | Luis Miguel | — | Luis Miguel Tour | 2,612 / 4,500 | $167,496 | |
| June 9, 2011 | Katy Perry | Robyn; DJ Skeet Skeet | California Dreams Tour | 7,792 / 7,792 | $350,640 | |
| August 24, 2011 | Chiddy Bang; Big Sean | The Hood Internet | Taste of UCF Concert | —N/a | —N/a | |
| October 22, 2011 | Lupe Fiasco; Panic! At The Disco; Eric Hutchinson | DJ Wizz Kid | Black and Gold Revolution Homecoming Concert Knight | 823 / 823 | $16,460 | |
| December 4, 2011 | Paul Simon | — | So Beautiful or So What Tour | 2,805 / 4,000 | $210,140 | |
| January 21, 2012 | Rise Against | A Day to Remember; The Menzingers | Endgame Tour | 5,443 / 5,988 | $179,007 | |
| January 27, 2012 | Avicii | — | House for Hunger Tour | —N/a | —N/a | |
| February 17, 2012 | Celtic Woman | — | Believe Tour | 2,219 / 5,159 | $109,328 | |
| February 4, 2012 | Miranda Lambert | Chris Young; Jerrod Niemann | On Fire Tour | 6,513 / 7,110 | $306,376 | |
| February 24, 2012 | Casting Crowns | Matthew West; Royal Tailor; Lindsay McCaul | Come to the Well Tour | 5,135 / 7,587 | $129,851 | |
| September 2, 2012 | Meek Mill; Tyga | DJ Demp | Back to School Labor Day Concert | —N/a | —N/a | Lundo, Andrew Floyd, and Big Head were the special guests. |
| October 26, 2012 | Lynyrd Skynyrd | — | Last of a Dyin' Breed Tour | 2,669 / 5,581 | $84,650 | |
| October 27, 2012 | Snoop Dogg | — | UCF Homecoming Concert 2012 | 3,522 / 7,510 | $6,720 | |
| November 30, 2012 | Wiz Khalifa | Juicy J Chevy Woods; Lola Monroe; Tuki Carter; Berner | The 2050 Tour | —N/a | —N/a | |
| April 9, 2013 | Kendrick Lamar; Steve Aoki | — | VERGE Tour | —N/a | —N/a | |
| May 15, 2013 | Cirque du Soleil | — | Quidam | 16,258 | $940,000 | |
| May 16, 2013 | Cirque du Soleil | — | Quidam | 16,258 | $940,000 | |
| May 17, 2013 | Cirque du Soleil | — | Quidam | 16,258 | $940,000 | |
| May 18, 2013 | Cirque du Soleil | — | Quidam | 16,258 | $940,000 | |
| May 19, 2013 | Cirque du Soleil | — | Quidam | 16,258 | $940,000 | |
| September 19, 2013 | fun. | Tegan and Sara | Most Nights Tour | —N/a | —N/a | |
| September 23, 2013 | Imagine Dragons | Paper Route; The Neighbourhood | Night Visions Tour | —N/a | —N/a | |
| October 8, 2013 | Sigur Rós | Julianna Barwick | Sigur Rós World Tour | 1,700 / 3,000 | $62,989 | |
| October 11, 2013 | OneRepublic | TeamMate | truthLIVE Tour | —N/a | —N/a | |
| November 5, 2013 | Paramore | Hellogoodbye; Metric | The Self-Titled Tour | —N/a | —N/a | |
| October 14, 2014 | Five Finger Death Punch; Volbeat | Nothing More; Hellyeah | Five Finger Death Punch and Volbeat Fall Tour | 5,901 / 7,656 | $239,867 | |
| October 20, 2014 | B.o.B | Icona Pop | No Genre Tour (UCF Homecoming 2014: Concert Knight) | —N/a | —N/a | |
| February 26, 2015 | Kid Ink; Hoodie Allen | — | KnightFest 2015 | —N/a | —N/a | |
| October 15, 2015 | Zedd | Dillon Francis; Alex Metric | True Colors Tour | —N/a | —N/a | |
| November 7, 2015 | Mary J. Blige | Tamar Braxton | MJB Live! | —N/a | —N/a | |
| January 28, 2016 | Tool | Primus; 3Teeth | North American Tour 2016 | 7,871 / 8,116 | $613,421 | |
| March 31, 2016 | The Chainsmokers | Daya | KnightFest 2016 | —N/a | —N/a | |
| April 14, 2016 | Pentatonix | Us The Duo; AJ Lehrman | Pentatonix World Tour | 6,961 / 7,470 | $388,055 | |
| May 16, 2016 | Amy Schumer | — | Spring Stand Up Comedy Tour 2016 | 4,450 / 4,725 | $203,947 | |
| June 4, 2016 | Ellie Goulding | — | Delirium World Tour | 6,308 / 7,660 | —N/a | |
| July 6, 2016 | Halsey | Bad Suns | Badlands Tour | —N/a | —N/a | |
| September 18, 2016 | Meghan Trainor | Hailee Steinfeld | The Untouchable Tour | 6,230 / 6,515 | $258,079 | |
| November 10, 2016 | Chris Young | Dustin Lynch; Cassadee Pope | I'm Comin' Over Tour | 4,450 / 4,725 | $203,947 | |
| March 17, 2017 | Casting Crowns | Danny Gokey; Unspoken | The Very Next Thing Tour | —N/a | —N/a | |
| March 30, 2017 | DNCE | Knights of the Turn Tables | KnightFest 2017 | —N/a | —N/a | |
| April 25, 2017 | Daniel Tosh | — | tosh.show | 6,869 / 7,681 | $270,665 | |
| August 22, 2017 | Lil Jon | Throttle | Pegasus Palooza 2017 | —N/a | —N/a | |
| August 30, 2017 | Bryson Tiller | H.E.R. Metro Boomin | Set It Off Tour | —N/a | —N/a | |
| October 12, 2017 | Martin Garrix | Jacquees | UCF Homecoming: Concert Knight 2017 | —N/a | —N/a | |
| December 31, 2017 | Kevin Hart | — | Irresponsible Tour | —N/a | —N/a | |
| May 17, 2018 | ODESZA | — | 2018 A Moment Apart Tour | —N/a | —N/a | |
| August 21, 2018 | Metro Boomin | — | Metro Boomin Live at UCF | —N/a | —N/a | |
| November 8, 2018 | A$AP Ferg | Ella Mai | UCF Homecoming: Concert Knight 2018 | —N/a | —N/a | |
| December 7, 2018 | Migos | Tee Grizzley; BlocBoy JB; La4ss | Migos Live in Concert | —N/a | —N/a | |
| January 25, 2019 | Bring Me the Horizon | Thrice; Fever 333 | First Love World Tour | 4,514 / 6,395 | $189,989 | |
| February 10, 2019 | Adam Sandler | — | 100% Fresher Tour | —N/a | —N/a | Rob Schneider was the special guest. |
| April 1, 2019 | Why Don't We | EBEN | 8 Letters Tour | —N/a | —N/a | |
| October 12, 2019 | for KING & COUNTRY | — | Burn the Ships Tour | —N/a | —N/a | |

== See also ==
- Greater Orlando
- List of NCAA Division I basketball arenas

Events and tenants
| Preceded by First arena | Home of the Orlando Fantasy; 2010 | Succeeded by Last arena |
| Preceded by Kohl Center | Home of the Science Olympiad National Tournament; 2012 | Succeeded by Nutter Center |
| Preceded by Nutter Center | Home of the Science Olympiad National Tournament; 2014 | Succeeded by Bob Devaney Sports Center |
| Preceded by Amway Center | Home of the Orlando Predators; 2014 | Succeeded by Kia Center |
