= Tim Bergling Foundation =

Mental health awareness foundation

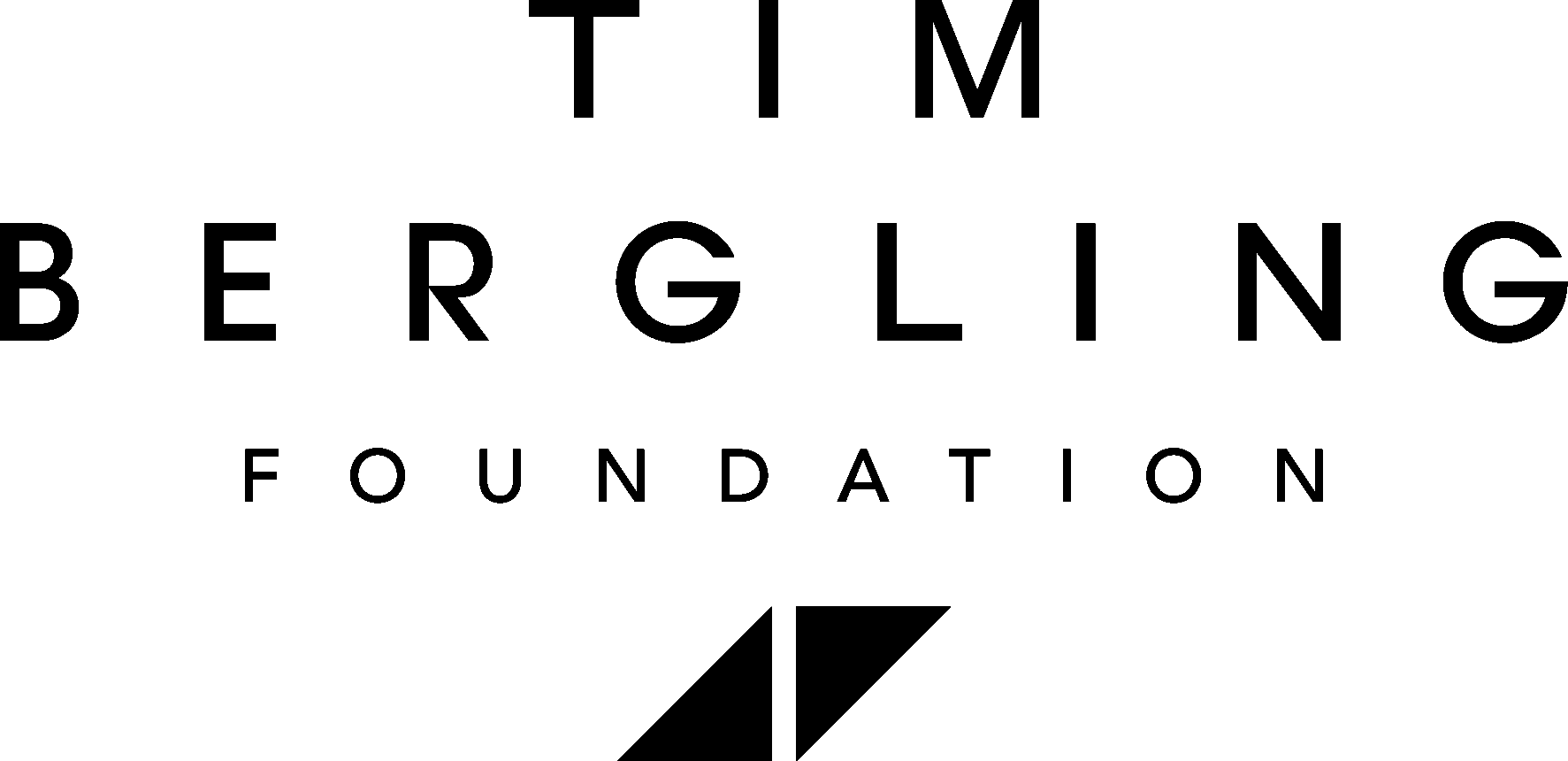

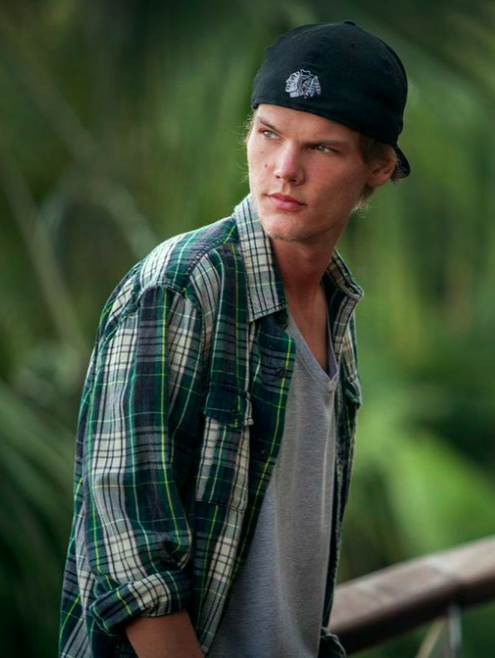
- Avicii; the foundation's name sake and inspiration of its creation.
- Formation: 26 March 2019; 7 years ago
- Founders: Klas Bergling; Anki Lidén
- Type: Charity
- Website: timberglingfoundation.org

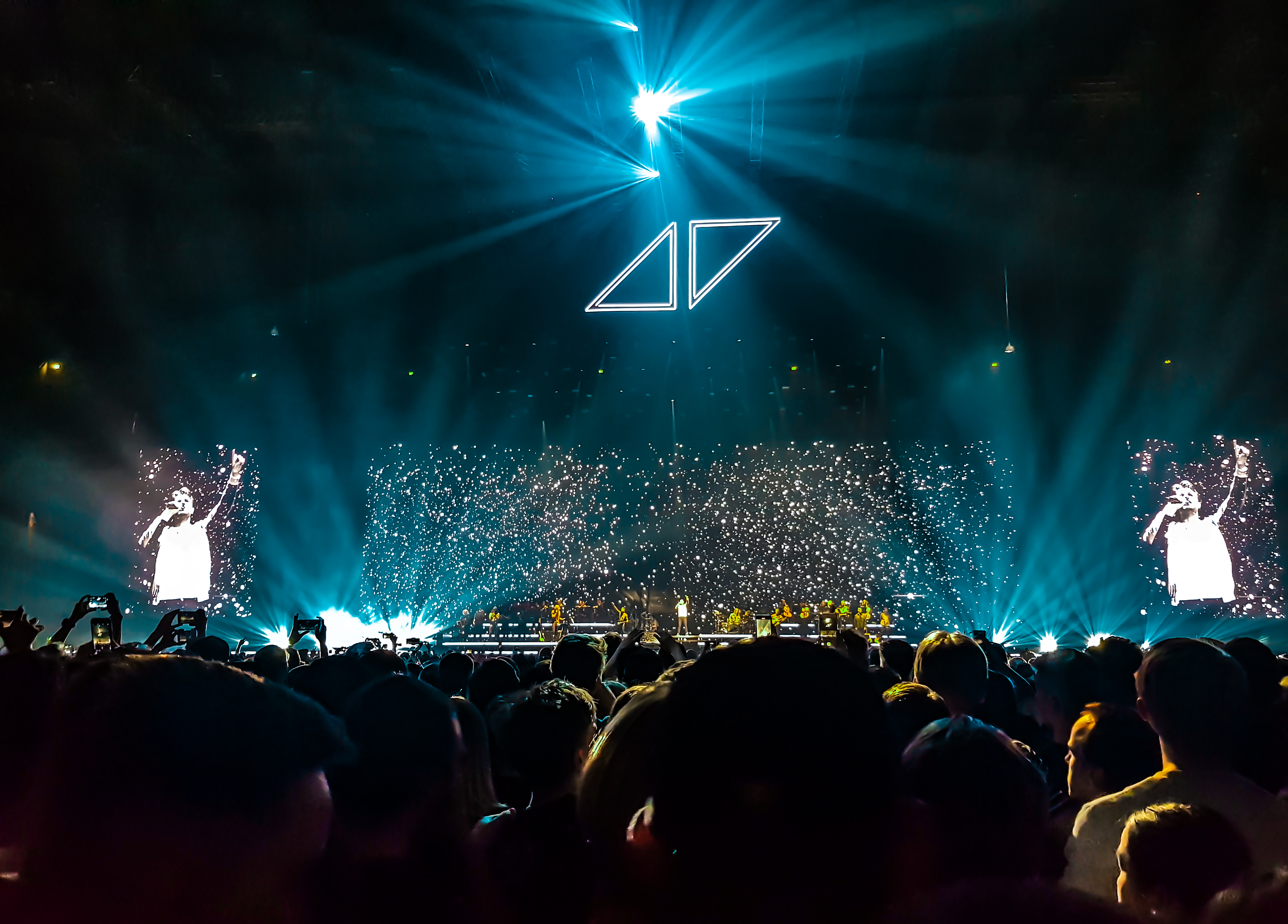
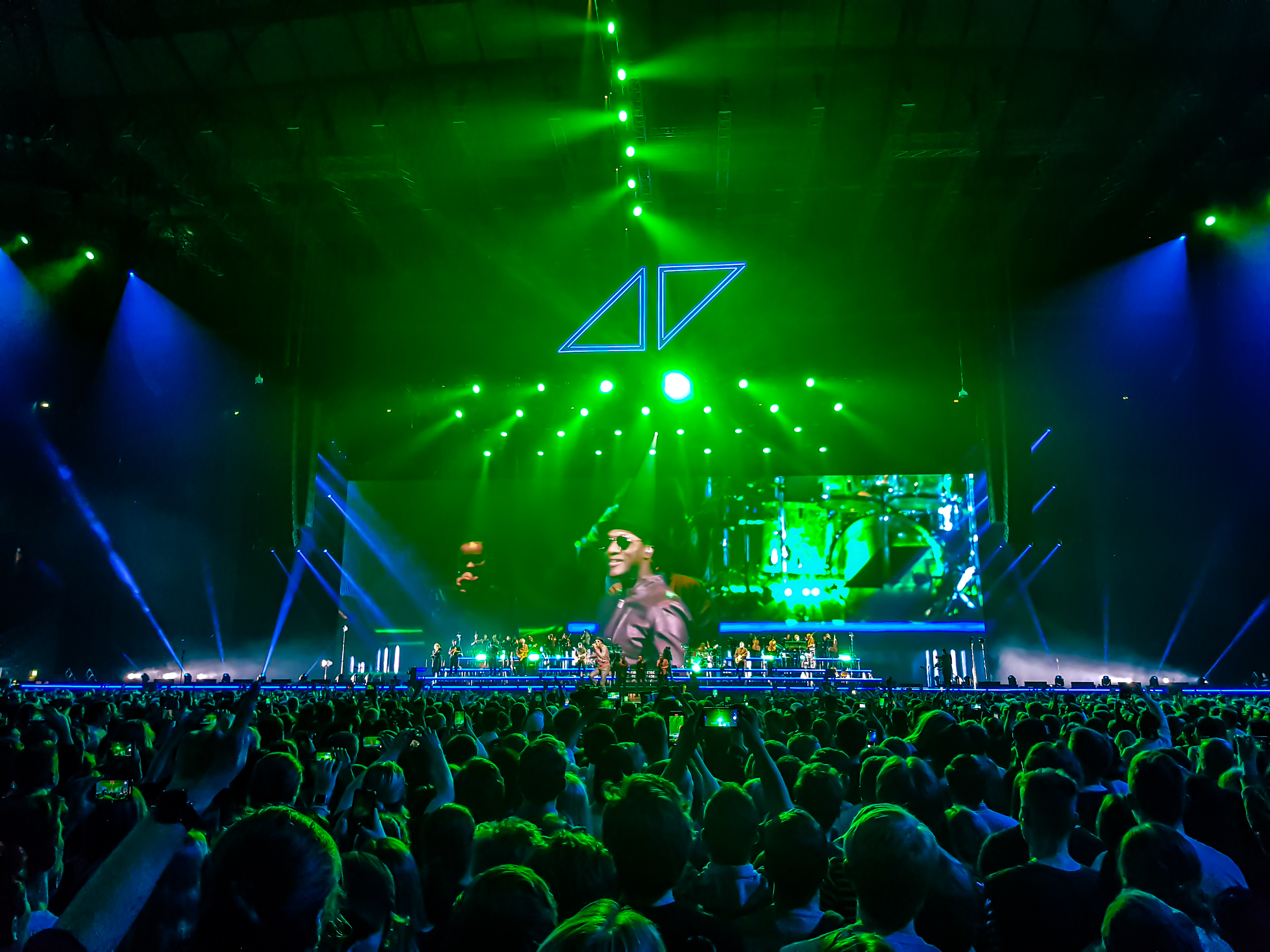
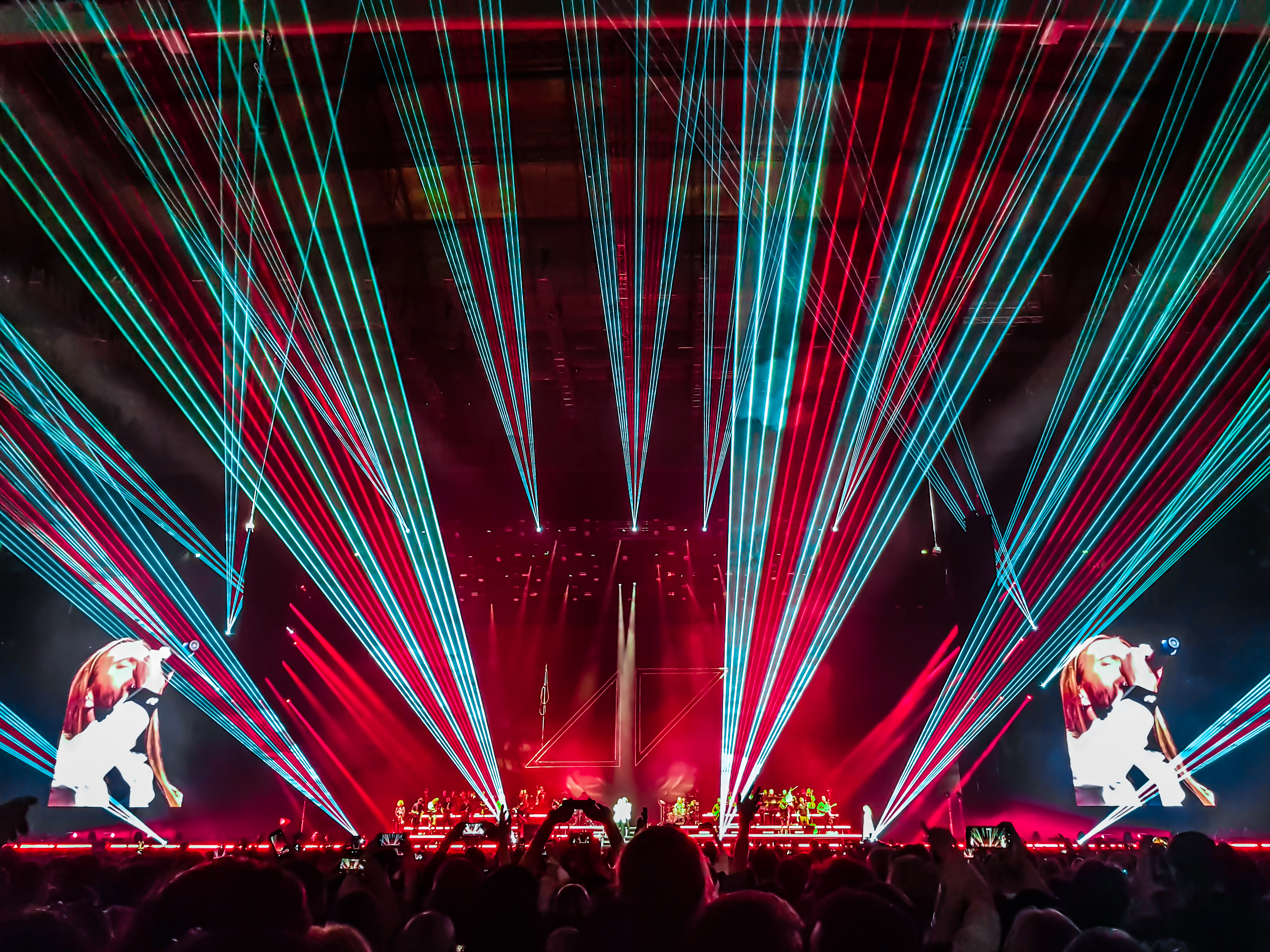
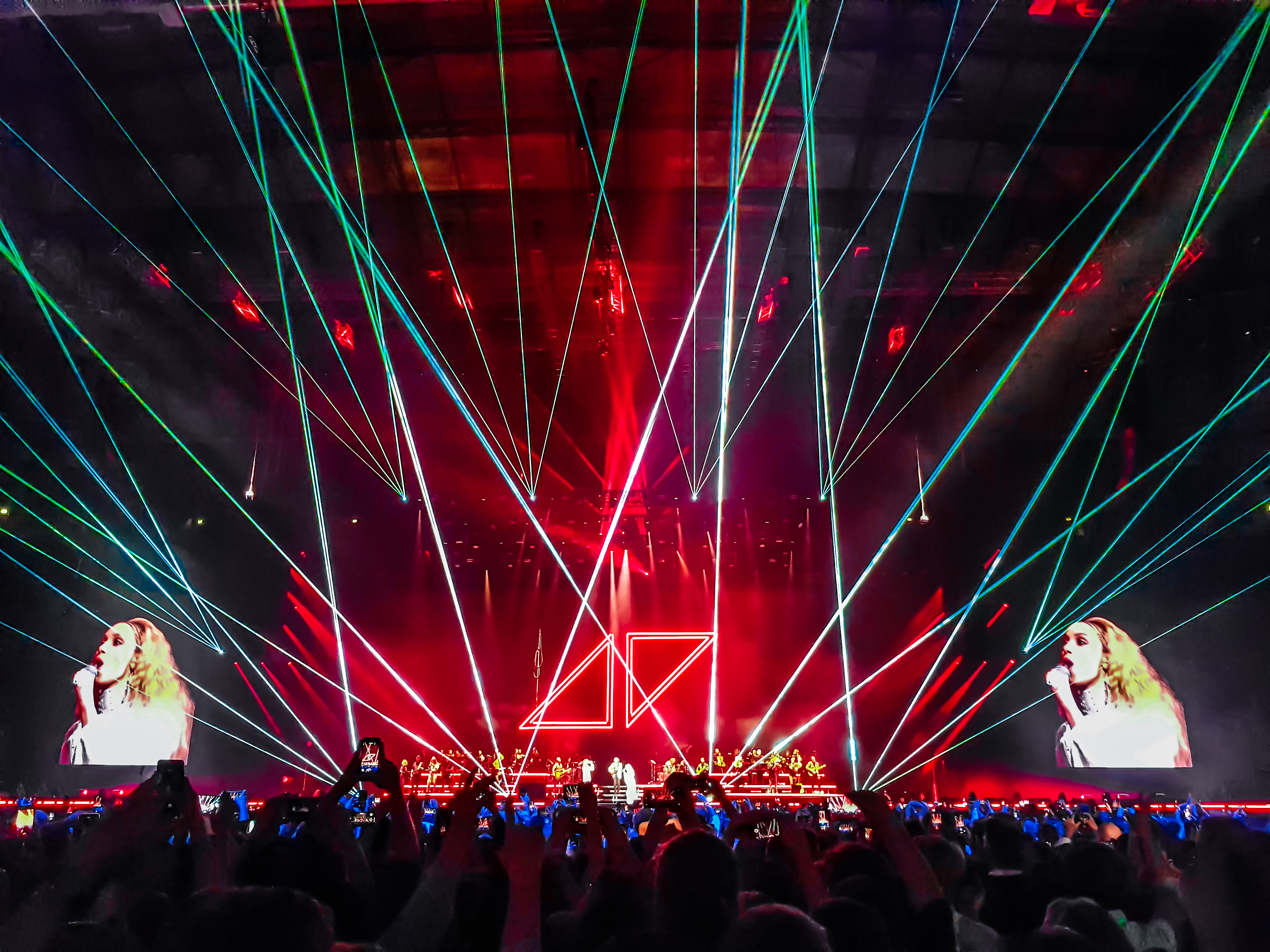
Pictures from a tribute concert in December 2019 that raised money for the foundation.

The Tim Bergling Foundation is a foundation created by the family of the Swedish DJ Tim Bergling, known as Avicii, in March 2019, to "honour his memory and continue to act in his spirit" after Bergling committed suicide due to mental health issues. In addition to mental health awareness and suicide prevention, the foundation supports initiatives where Avicii had a passion, such as climate change, global hunger, and wildlife conservation.

== Funding ==
The organization has received funding from the following sources:

- Proceeds from the sale of Avicii's posthumous album Tim (2019).
- Proceeds from the sale of Tim (2021), an official biography written by Måns Mosesson.
- Proceeds from ticket sales to tribute concerts, including a concert at Friends Arena in December 2019.
- Proceeds from ticket sales to Avicii Experience, a museum in Stockholm dedicated to Avicii.
- Proceeds from the sale of 75% of Bergling's master recordings and publishing rights to Pophouse Entertainment in September 2022. The proceeds were estimated at over $100 million.

== Philanthropy ==
The foundation's philanthropic activities include:

- Financially supports suicide prevention organizations including Mind, Bris, and Suicide Zero
- Equips schools with podcast gear and training so healthcare personnel can talk openly with students about mental health and drug or alcohol risks
- Builds music studios in Sweden to offer young people recreational spaces to process experiences.
