= Avici (disambiguation) =

Avīci, or Avichi, is the lowest level of Hell in Buddhism.

Avici may also refer to:

- Avīci (01), a 2017 extended play by Avicii
- Avici (Korean: 아비) a 21 November 2015 (season 6) episode of KBS Drama Special (Korean: 드라마 스페셜)

== See also ==
- Avicii (born Tim Bergling; 1989–2018), Swedish electronic music artist
  - Avicii: True Stories, a 2017 biographical documentary film about the artist
- Avichi Meiyappan (1907–1979), Indian filmmaker
