= Inox Festival =

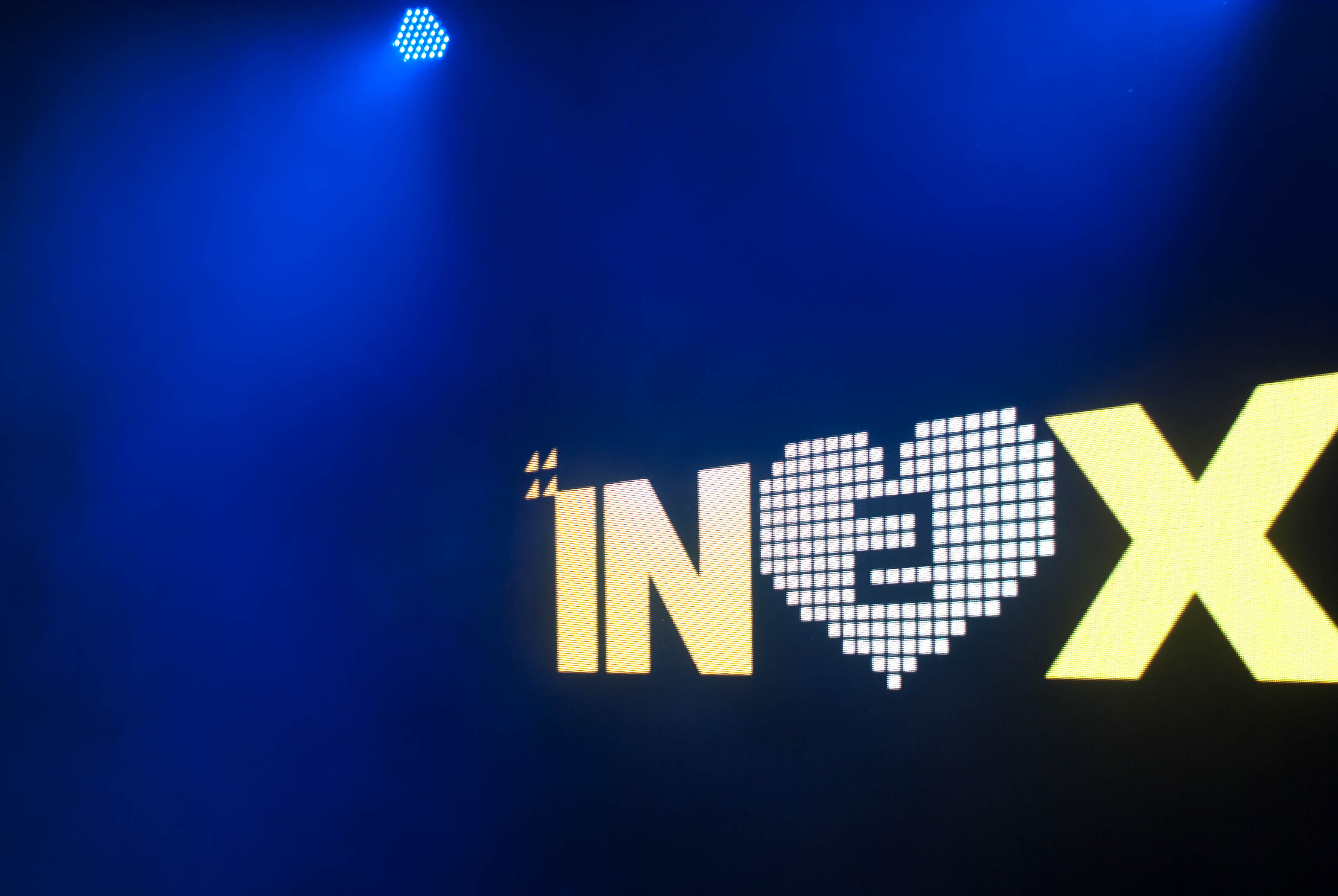
- Inox Festival 2011 Stage
- Genre: Electronic dance music
- Locations: Toulouse, France
- Years active: 2003–present
- Website: http://www.inox-festival.com/

Inox festival was created in 2003 by Marc TAMBON, owner of “La Dune” nightclub in Toulouse, France. The electronic music festival is famous for having hosted DJ's such as Joachim Garraud, Avicii, Sebastien Drums and many others. After the success of the festival, Inox owner created Inox club events in La Dune and changed the club's name into Club Rouge. Due to high demands, Inox Festival expended to Strasbourg in 2009. In 2010 the first Inox Park opened in Paris. The Paris Festival lasted three days and was a success. Since then, Inox has been doing worldwide festivals in places such as Rio de Janeiro.

== Inox Festivals ==
=== Toulouse ===
The Toulouse Inox Festival was created in May 2003. The festival has since taken place every year in "Club Rouge" located in Toulouse. Inox is a three-day electronic music festival. In 2011, the Toulouse Festival had approximately 35000 people attending.

==== Artists ====
2005

- Carl Cox
- Sasha
- Tom Pooks
- David Guetta
- Erick Morillo
- David Moreno
- Javier Munoz
- Reche
- Didier Sinclair
- Eric Prydz
- Laurent Wolf
- Pendulum
- Verse
- NU Balance
- Le Lutin
- Miss Ficel
- Brooks
- BlackStrobe deck and EFX
- AlterEgo
- Darren Price

2006

- Carl Cox
- Jeff Mills
- Felix Da Housecat
- Deep Dish
- David Guetta
- Tom Pooks
- Booka Shade
- Bob Sinclar
- Antony
- Ricardo Villalobos
- Tania Vulcano
- Monika Kruse
- Marc Romboy
- Dirty Princess
- Digitalism
- Robbie Rivera
- Joachim Garraud
- Andrew Weatherall
- Martin Solveig
- Dj Ralf
- André Dalcan
- Greg Delon
- LTJ Bukem feat MC Conrad
- Elisa Do Brasil

2007

- Monika Kruse
- Joris Voorn
- Jeff Mills
- John Digweed
- Dave Seaman
- Nick Warren
- Jimmy Van M
- Technasia
- IorDee
- José Louis
- Martin Solveig
- Bob Sinclar
- David Vendetta
- Sven Vath
- Tekel
- Dominik Eulberg
- Steve Angello
- David Guetta
- Joachim Garraud
- Eric Prydz aka Cirez D
- Scan X
- Anthony Rother
- D'Julz
- Alex Under
- André Dalcan

2008

- David Guetta
- Joachim Garraud
- Sebastien Leger
- John Digweed
- Sasha
- Scarlett Etienne
- Samy, Charly B
- Tonio
- Greg Modi In
- Aria
- Tomstom
- Dirty B
- Squal

2009

- David Guetta
- Eric Prydz
- Bob Sinclar
- Fedde le Grand
- Martin Solveig
- Axwell
- Joachim Garraud
- Laidback Luke
- Sebastien Leger
- Dirty South
- Dj Ralf
- Sebatien Bennett
- Philippe B
- Richie Hawtin
- Dubfire
- 2 Many Dj's
- Luciano
- Dj Hell
- Dave Clarke
- Boys Noize
- Marco Carola
- Agoria vs Oxia
- Dj Mehdi
- Guy Gerber
- David Carretta
- Micro Clima

2010

- David Guetta
- Dubfire
- Martin Solveig
- Chris Liebing
- Crookers
- Marco Carola
- Joachim Garraud
- Laidback Luke
- Sino Live
- Technasia & Dosem
- Antoine Clamaran
- Tocadisco
- Chukie
- Monika Kruse
- Gaiser
- Afrojack
- Zombie Nation
- Surkin
- Anja Schneider
- Bart B More
- Arno Cost
- Avicii
- Teo Moss
- Sebastien Benett
- Tristan Garner

2011

- Avicii
- Magda
- Kiko
- Carl Cox
- Tristan Garner
- David Guetta
- Sebastien Drums
- Martin Solveig
- Dj Ralf
- Moonbeam
- Umek
- Felix Kröcher
- Miss Kittin
- Stephane Bodzin
- Gaiser
- Richie Hawtin
- Joachim Garraud

=== Strasbourg ===
After the success of several Toulouse festivals, Inox expanded northwards to Strasbourg in 2009. On the night of 14 November 2009, approximately 8000 electronic music fans participated to Strasbourg Inox festival at Salle Rhénus located in Place Foire des Expositions. Since then, electronic music fans from France and all around the world have had the opportunity every November to see some of the most world-renowned DJs. The second Strasbourg Inox festival took place in November 2010, with DJs including Laidback Luke, Joachim Garraud and Martin Solveig performing. The third Strasbourg Inox festival is to be held in November 2011.

==== Artists ====
2009

- Bob Sinclar
- Joachim Garraud
- Antoine Clamaran
- Dj Ralf
- Luciano
- Dubfire
- Chris Liebing
- Josh Wink

2010

- Martin Solveig
- Laidback Luke
- Joachim Garraud
- Mathieu Bouthier
- Jeff Mills
- Popof
- Felix Kröcher
- Dan Ghenacia

== INOX Paris Park ==
The Inox Park Paris is an electronic festival lasting 12 hours. The festival takes place on l'île des Impressionnistes at Chatou (78400) every September since 2010. The 2011 edition attracted more than 12.000 spectators.

=== Artists ===
2010

- Eric Prydz
- Bob Sinclar
- Martin Solveig
- Dubfire
- Richie Hawtin
- Jeff Mills
- Popof
- Loco Dice
- Antoine Clamaran
- Joachim Garraud
- D'Julz
- Sebastien Benett

2011

- Joachim Garraud
- Avicii
- Axwell
- Beat Torrent
- BeatauCue
- D'Julz
- Mathieu Bouthier
- Nasser
- Skrillex
- Steroe Heroes
- Steve Aoki
- Sven Väth
- Technasia
- Michael Kaiser
- Remain

2012

- Armin Van Buuren
- Laidback Luke
- Alesso
- Joachim Garraud
- Hardwell
- R3hab
- Michael Calfan
- Jidax
- Dubfire
- Steve Lawler
- Oliver Huntemann
- Popof
- Maetrik
- Steve Aoki
- Valentino Jorno
- Flux Pavilion
- Borgore
- Zedd
- Tommy Trash
- Cyberpunkers

== See also ==
- List of electronic music festivals
