= Stories World Tour =

2015 concert tour by Avicii

- Tour by Avicii
- Associated album: Stories
- Start date: 27 February 2015
- End date: 28 August 2015
- Legs: 4
- No. of shows: 9 in Oceania; 2 in Asia; 9 in North America; 15 in Europe; 35 total

Avicii concert chronology
- True Tour (2014); Stories World Tour (2015)

The Stories World Tour was the second and final worldwide concert tour by Swedish DJ Avicii.

== Tour dates ==
Date	City	Country	Venue
Oceania
27 February 2015 (Note: The concert on February 28, 2015, at Mount Smart Stadium in Auckland was part of Future Sound System.)	Auckland	New Zealand	Mount Smart Stadium
28 February 2015 (Note: The concert on February 28, 2015, at Randwick Racecourse in Sydney was part of the Future Music Festival.)	Sydney	Australia	Randwick Racecourse
1 March 2015 (Note: The concert on March 1, 2015, at Randwick Racecourse in Sydney was part of the Good Life Music Festival.)	Sydney	Australia	Randwick Racecourse
1 March 2015 (Note: The concert on March 1, 2015, at HBF Arena in Perth was part of the Future Music Festival.)	Perth	Australia	HBF Arena
2 March 2015 (Note: The concert on March 2, 2015, at HBF Arena in Perth was part of the Good Life Music Festival.)	Perth	Australia	HBF Arena
6 March 2015 (Note: The concert on March 6, 2015, at RNA Showgrounds in Brisbane was part of the Good Life Music Festival.)	Brisbane	Australia	RNA Showgrounds
7 March 2015 (Note: The concert on March 7, 2015, at RNA Showgrounds in Brisbane was part of the Future Music Festival.)	Brisbane	Australia	RNA Showgrounds
8 March 2015 (Note: The concert on March 8, 2015, at Flemington Racecourse in Melbourne was part of the Future Music Festival.)	Melbourne	Australia	Flemington Racecourse
9 March 2015 (Note: The concert on March 9, 2015, at Flemington Racecourse in Melbourne was part of the Good Life Music Festival.)	Melbourne	Australia	Flemington Racecourse
9 March 2015 (Note: The concert on March 9, 2015, at Adelaide Showgrounds in Adelaide was part of the Future Music Festival.)	Adelaide	Australia	Adelaide Showgrounds
Asia
13 March 2015 (Note: The concert on March 13, 2015, at Changi Exhibition Centre in Singapore was part of the Future Music Festival.)	Singapore	Singapore	Changi Exhibition Centre
14 March 2015	Jakarta	Indonesia	Become One Festival
North America
27 March 2015	Miami	United States	Ultra Music Festival
28 March 2015	Las Vegas	United States	Encore Las Vegas
31 March 2015	Las Vegas	United States	Encore Las Vegas
11 April 2015	Las Vegas	United States	Encore Las Vegas
18 April 2015	Las Vegas	United States	Encore Las Vegas
1 May 2015	Las Vegas	United States	Encore Las Vegas
9 May 2015	Las Vegas	United States	Encore Las Vegas
16 May 2015	Las Vegas	United States	Encore Las Vegas
24 May 2015	Las Vegas	United States	Encore Las Vegas
Europe
29 May 2015 (Note: The concert on May 29, 2015, at Ullevi in Gothenburg was part of the Summerburst.)	Gothenburg	Sweden	Ullevi
30 May 2015 (Note: The concert on May 29, 2015, at Bislett Stadion in Oslo was part of the Findings Festival.)	Oslo	Norway	Bislett Stadion
Africa
1 June 2015 (Note: The concert on June 1st, 2015 at OLM Souissi in Rabat was part of the Mawazine Festival.)	Rabat	Morocco	Mawazine
Europe
5 June 2015 (Note: The concert on June 5, 2015, at Commerzbank-Arena in Frankfurt was part of the World Club Dome.)	Frankfurt	Germany	Commerzbank-Arena
12 June 2015 (Note: The concert on May 29, 2015, at Gärdet in Stockholm was part of the Summerburst.)	Stockholm	Sweden	Gärdet
13 June 2015	Landgraaf	Netherlands	Pinkpop Festival
3 July 2015	Dublin	Ireland	Marlay Park
4 July 2015 (Note: The concert on July 4, 2015, at London in United Kingdom was part of the Wireless Festival.)	London	United Kingdom	Finsbury Park
10 July 2015	Le Barcarès	France	Electrobeach Music Festival
11 July 2015	Chorley	United Kingdom	T in the Park
11 July 2015	Kinross	United Kingdom	T in the Park
24 July 2015	Boom	Belgium	Tomorrowland
31 July 2015	Cluj-Napoca	Romania	Untold Festival
7 August 2015	Skanderborg	Denmark	Skanderborg Festival
8 August 2015	Helsinki	Finland	Weekend Festival
21 August 2015	Graz	Austria	Lake Festival
28 August 2015	Daresbury	United Kingdom	Creamfields
29 August 2015	Daresbury	United Kingdom	Creamfields
