= Anton Körberg =

Swedish television presenter, musician and actor

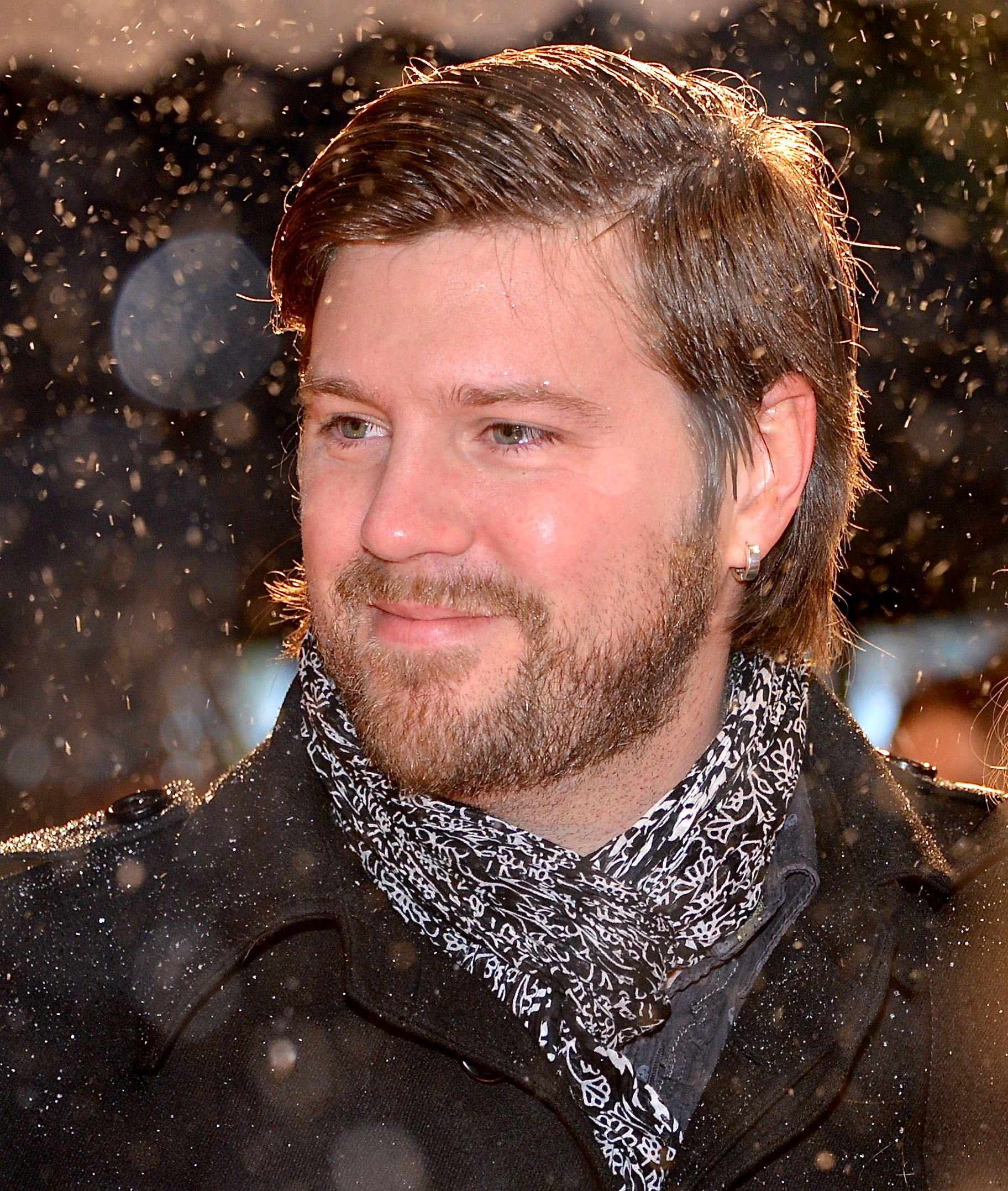
- Körberg in 2012
- Born: 24 November 1977 (age 48)
- Occupations: Actor, television presenter, musician
- Parents: Tommy Körberg (father); Anki Lidén (mother)
- Relatives: Avicii (half-brother)

Dan Anton Fabian Körberg (born 24 November 1977) is a Swedish television presenter, musician and actor.

He is the son of Tommy Körberg and Anki Lidén. He is also the half-brother of the late DJ Avicii. He played the character Adam Frick in the TV-series Vita lögner (1997–1998) broadcast on TV3, he has presented the game show ”Pussel” broadcast on TV4, and the comedy clip show ”All världens reklam” broadcast on TV11. He has also acted in the TV-series Karatefylla broadcast on TV6. Körberg plays the drums in the country rockband "Boots On" and also the band Roxie 77 aka "Happy Pill" with guitarist Ryan Roxie who has played with Alice Cooper, Slash and Electric Angels.

Between 2009 and 2015, he was the presenter of the morning show Morronrock on the radio station Rockklassiker.

As a voice actor he made the Swedish voices for the character Spitelout Jorgenson in How to Train Your Dragon (2010), and P.H. in the movie Hop (2011).
