= Birger Bergling =

Swedish scenographer and costume designer

- Born: Carl Birger Bergling; 1 February 1903; Djursholm, Danderyd, Stockholm
- Died: 21 June 1973 (aged 70); Österåker, Stockholm
- Resting place: Skogskyrkogården, Stockholm, Sweden
- Occupations: Scenographer, costume designer
- Spouse: Else Kalf (m. 1930; died 1970)
- Children: 5
- Parents: Otto Bergling (father); Gusta Marie Rian (mother)
- Relatives: Avicii (grandson)

Carl Birger Bergling (1 February 1903 – 21 May 1973) was a Swedish scenographer and costume designer at the Royal Swedish Opera.
