= List of awards and nominations received by Avicii =

Avicii awards and nominations
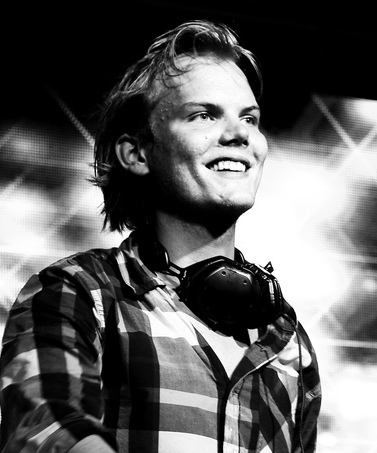
- Avicii in 2011
Awards and nominations
	Wins	Nominations
American Music Awards	1	2
Billboard Music Awards	1	6
Echo Music Awards	2	2
Grammy Awards	0	2
iHeartRadio Music Awards	1	2
International Dance Music Awards	1	4
MTV Europe Music Awards	4	9
MTV Video Music Awards	1	6
Teen Choice Awards	1	1
World Music Awards	2	8
- Totals
Wins	20
Nominations	46

This is a list of awards and nominations received by Swedish DJ and producer, Avicii (1989–2018).

== American Music Awards ==
The American Music Awards is an annual American music awards show created by Dick Clark in 1973, which airs on ABC. Avicii received three nominations and won one.

Year	Nominee / work	Award	Result
2013	Avicii	Favorite Electronic Dance Music Artist	Won
2014	Avicii	Favorite Electronic Dance Music Artist	Nominated
2019	Avicii	Favorite Electronic Dance Music Artist	Nominated

== Billboard Music Awards ==
The Billboard Music Awards are an annual awards show from Billboard Magazine, Avicii received six nominations and won once.

Year	Nominee / work	Award	Result
2014	"Wake Me Up"	Top Radio Song	Nominated
2014	"Wake Me Up"	Top Dance/Electronic Song	Won
2014	True	Top Dance/Electronic Album	Nominated
2014	Avicii	Top Dance/Electronic Artist	Nominated
2015	Avicii	Top Dance/Electronic Artist	Nominated
2018	Avīci (01)	Top Dance/Electronic Album	Nominated
2020	Avicii	Top Dance/Electronic Artist	Nominated
2020	Tim	Top Dance/Electronic Album	Nominated

== DJ Magazine top 100 DJs ==
Year	Position	Notes	Ref.
2010	39	New Entry	
2011	6	—	
2012	3	—	
2013	3	—	
2014	6	—	
2015	7	—	
2016	11	—	
2017	28	—	
2018	15	—	

== Echo Music Awards ==
The Echo Music Awards is an annual music awards ceremony presented by Deutsche Phono-Akademie in Germany. Avicii won two awards.

Year	Nominee / work	Award	Result
2014	Avicii	Electronic Dance Music National/International	Won
2014	Avicii	Hit des Jahres	Won

== GAFFA Awards ==
=== Denmark GAFFA Awards ===
Delivered since 1991, the GAFFA Awards are a Danish award that rewards popular music by the magazine of the same name.

Year	Nominee / work	Award	Result	Ref.
2013	Himself	Best Foreign New Act	Won	

=== Sweden GAFFA Awards ===
Delivered since 2010, the GAFFA Awards (Swedish: GAFFA Priset) are a Swedish award that rewards popular music awarded by the magazine of the same name.

Year	Nominee / work	Award	Result	Ref.
2014	True: Avicii by Avicii	Best Dance	Won	

== Grammis Awards ==
The Grammis are music awards presented annually to musicians and songwriters in Sweden. The oldest Swedish music awards, they were instituted as a local equivalent of the Grammy Awards given in the United States.

Year	Category	Work	Outcome	Ref.
2012	Best Electro/Dance	"Levels"/"Fade into Darkness"	Nominated	
2012	Best Innovator	—	Won	
2012	Best Song	"Levels"	Won	
2012	Best International Success	—	Nominated	
2013	Best Electro/Dance	"Silhouettes"/"Superlove"	Nominated	
2014	Best Album	True	Nominated	
2014	Best Artist	—	Won	
2014	Best Electro/Dance	True	Nominated	
2014	Best Song	"Wake Me Up"	Nominated	
2014	Best Producer	—	Nominated	
2014	Best Innovator	—	Nominated	
2015	Best Electro/Dance	"The Days"/"The Nights"	Nominated	
2015	Best Song	"The Days"	Nominated	
2016	Best Electro/Dance	Stories	Nominated	
2016	Best Song	"Waiting for Love"	Nominated	
2018	Best Electro/Dance	Avīci (01)	Nominated	
2018	Best Song	"Without You"	Nominated	
2020	Best Electro/Dance	TIM	Won	
2020	Best Electro/Dance	"SOS"	Won	
2020	Best Composer	—	Nominated	

== Grammy Awards ==
The Grammy Awards are awarded by the National Academy of Recording Arts and Sciences of the United States. Avicii received no awards from two nominations.

Year	Nominee / work	Award	Result
2012	"Sunshine" (David Guetta & Avicii)	Best Dance Recording	Nominated
2013	"Levels"	Best Dance Recording	Nominated

== iHeartRadio Music Awards ==
The iHeartRadio Music Awards is an awards show created by iHeartRadio. Avicii received two nominations and won an award.

Year	Nominee / work	Award	Result
2014	"Wake Me Up"	Best Lyrics	Nominated
2014	"Wake Me Up"	EDM Song of the Year	Won

== International Dance Music Awards ==
The International Dance Music Awards are held annually as part of the Winter Music Conference. Avicii has received five nominations and won two.

Year	Nominee / work	Award	Result
2013	Avicii	Best Artist (Solo)	Won
2013	Avicii	Best European DJ	Nominated
2013	Avicii	Best Remixer	Nominated
2013	Levels Podcast	Best Podcast	Nominated
2020	TIM	Best Album	Won

== MTV Europe Music Awards ==
The MTV Europe Music Awards were established in 1994 by MTV Networks Europe, Avicii received seven nominations and won three.

Year	Nominee / work	Award	Result
2012	Avicii	Best Electronic	Nominated
2012	Avicii	Best Swedish Act	Nominated
2013	Avicii	Best Electronic	Won
2013	Avicii	Best Swedish Act	Won
2013	Avicii	Best Northern European Act	Nominated
2015	Avicii	Best Electronic	Nominated
2015	Avicii	Best Swedish Act	Nominated
2018	Avicii	Best Swedish Act	Won
2019	Avicii	Best Swedish Act	Won

== MTV Video Music Awards ==
The MTV Video Music Awards are presented annually by MTV and honor accomplishments in the music video medium. Avicii has received six nominations.

Year	Nominee / work	Award	Result
2012	"Levels"	Best Electronic Dance Music Video	Nominated
2012	"Levels"	Best Choreography	Nominated
2014	"Wake Me Up"	Best Pop Video	Nominated
2014	"Hey Brother"	Best Video with a Social Message	Nominated
2018	"Lonely Together" (feat. Rita Ora)	Best Dance Video	Won
2018	"Lonely Together" (feat. Rita Ora)	Best Visual Effects	Nominated

== Teen Choice Awards ==
The Teen Choice Awards is an annual award ceremony to honour the year's biggest achievements in entertainment and is voted by teen viewers. Avicii has won an award.

Year	Nominee / work	Award	Result
2014	"Wake Me Up"	Choice EDM Song	Won

== World Music Awards ==
The World Music Awards is an annual awards ceremony that honors best selling artists in the record industry. Avicii received eight nominations.

Year	Nominee / work	Award	Result
2014	"Wake Me Up"	World's Best Song	Nominated
2014	"Wake Me Up"	World's Best Video	Nominated
2014	True	World's Best Album	Nominated
2014	Avicii	World's Best Male	Nominated
2014	Avicii	World's Best Live Act	Nominated
2014	Avicii	World's Best Electronic Dance Artist	Won
2014	Avicii	World's Best Entertainer of the Year	Nominated
2014	Avicii	World's Best Swedish Act	Won
