= House for Hunger =

2012 concert tour by Avicii

- Tour by Avicii
- Start date: January 5, 2012
- End date: January 31, 2012
- No. of shows: 26 in North America

Avicii concert chronology
- House for Hunger (2012); True Tour (2014)

House for Hunger was a tour by musician Avicii announced in 2011 where Avicii donated his entire income from the tour to the charity Feeding America.

== Overview ==
The tour featured 26 shows in 27 days and raised over $1 million for Feeding America which was estimated to provide 8 million meals to families across the United States.

The tours efforts were continued in 2013 with Avicii again donating funds during two Grammy week performances to the FEED Foundation. Chairman and co-founder of Feeding America, Lauren Bush said “We’re thrilled to be the beneficiary of Avicii and House of Hunger’s continued efforts to raise funds for the fight against hunger. Avicii is truly leading the charge in inspiring young people, and the house music industry, to get involved and to give back.” The donation was estimated to provide 2 million school meals to programs in the most impoverished parts of Africa.

== Tour dates ==
Date	City	Country	Venue
January 5, 2012	Detroit	United States	The Fillmore Detroit
January 6, 2012	Minneapolis	United States	Epic Nightclub
January 7, 2012	Milwaukee	United States	The Rave
January 8, 2012	Pittsburgh	United States	Stage AE Amphitheater
January 9, 2012	Hanover	United States	Dartmouth College
January 10, 2012	St. Louis	United States	The Pageant
January 12, 2012	Kansas City	United States	Midland Theatre
January 13, 2012	Boulder	United States	Boulder Theater
January 14, 2012	Reno	United States	Reno Downtown Ballroom
January 15, 2012	Tucson	United States	University of Arizona
January 15, 2012	Phoenix	United States	Phoenix Convention Center
January 16, 2012	Austin	United States	Austin Music Hall
January 17, 2012	San Antonio	United States	Cowboys Dancehall
January 18, 2012	El Paso	United States	Buchanan's Event Center
January 19, 2012	Houston	United States	Stereo Live
January 20, 2012	Dallas	United States	The Palladium
January 21, 2012	New York City	United States	Lavo Nightclub
January 24, 2012	Madison	United States	Orpheum Theatre
January 25, 2012	Seattle	United States	Paramount Theatre
January 26, 2012	Rochester	United States	Main Street Armory
January 27, 2012	Orlando	United States	University of Central Florida
January 28, 2012	San Juan	United States	Coliseum of Puerto Rico
January 29, 2012	Squaw Valley	United States	Summit Series
January 30, 2012	Kingston	United States	Ryan Center
January 31, 2012	Amherst	United States	Mullins Center
