= Tim (biography) =

2021 book by Måns Mosesson

Tim: The Official Biography of Avicii
- Author: Måns Mosesson
- Language: English
- Publisher: Sphere Books
- Publication date: November 16, 2021
- Publication place: Sweden

Tim: The Official Biography of Avicii is a 2021 book about Avicii, written by Swedish writer Måns Mosesson. The book is published by Sphere Books.

== History ==
In April 2021, it was announced that a biography of Avicii had been written by Måns Mosesson after travelling to locations such as Stockholm, Miami, Ibiza, and Los Angeles, where Tim lived and worked.

== Reception ==
Kitty Empire of The Guardian wrote, "There are no kneejerk conclusions here, just candour and context: pressure, both external and internal, absolutely played a role in Avicii’s unravelling, as did the US prescription opioid scandal." Katie Bain of Billboard said the book "offers an in-depth, honest and compassionate view of the life of Bergling, as he grew from a shy child to a teenager self-conscious about his acne to the global face of a new and revolutionary musical genre."
