= Anki Lidén =

Swedish actress

- Born: Anna Catarina Lidén; 5 April 1947 (age 79); Karlsborg, Sweden
- Occupation: Actress
- Years active: 1971–present
- Partners: Tommy Körberg; Klas Bergling
- Children: Anton; Tim

Anna Catarina Lidén (born 5 April 1947) is a Swedish actress. She has appeared in more than 50 films and television shows since 1971. She is the mother of Tim Bergling, a musician and DJ who was better known as Avicii.

== Selected filmography ==
- Polare (1976)
- Father to Be (1979)
- To Be a Millionaire (1980)
- My Life as a Dog (1985)
- Allra käraste syster (1988)
- Beck – Sista vittnet (2002)
