= Avicii: True Stories =

Documentary about the Swedish DJ and record producer Avicii

- Film poster
- Directed by: Levan Tsikurishvili
- Written by: Levan Tsikurishvili
- Produced by: Levan Tsikurishvili
- Starring: Tim Bergling; David Guetta; Wyclef Jean; Nile Rodgers; Tiësto; Chris Martin
- Edited by: Johan Lindvall; Francesco Loi; Nils Moström
- Production companies: Piece of Magic Entertainment; Black Dalmatian Films; SF Bio
- Distributed by: Netflix
- Release date: 26 October 2017
- Running time: 97 minutes
- Country: United States
- Languages: English; Swedish

Avicii: True Stories is a 2017 documentary film directed by Levan Tsikurishvili, about the Swedish DJ and record producer Avicii, with special appearances by David Guetta, Wyclef Jean, Nile Rodgers, Tiësto and Chris Martin. Avicii: True Stories premiered on 26 October 2017, in selected cinemas worldwide and was released on Netflix in the United States, the United Kingdom, and Australia on 28 December 2018.

== Synopsis ==
Avicii: True Stories is Tim Bergling's own story, told from the inside and made from his extensive personal and family archive and behind-the-scenes footage. The director, Levan Tsikurishvili, followed Bergling for over four years while capturing footage of his experiences and thinking. Tsikurishvili documented all stages of his career, including his decision to quit touring in 2016.

== Cast ==
- Tim Bergling
- David Guetta
- Wyclef Jean
- Nile Rodgers
- Chris Martin
- Tiesto
- Laidback Luke

Alex Ebert, Aloe Blacc, Carl Falk, Fredrik Boberg, Johan Bjerkelund, Sandro Cavazza, Salem Al Fakir, Per Dickson, and Michael Einziger also made appearances in the documentary.

== Soundtrack ==
- Robyn – "Hang with Me" (Avicii remix)
- Avicii – "Levels"
- Armin van Buuren – "Drowning" (Avicii remix)
- Rick Ross – "Hustlin'"
- Avicii – "Wake Me Up"
- Coldplay – "A Sky Full of Stars"
- Avicii – "Sunset Jesus"
- Avicii feat. Sandro Cavazza – "Lord"
- Avicii feat. Sandro Cavazza – "Without You"
- Avicii – "Ten More Days"
- Avicii – "Feeling Good"

== Production ==
The documentary featured appearances by colleagues such as Chris Martin, Nile Rodgers, David Guetta and Wyclef Jean. Some parts were filmed in Madagascar and Australia.

Director Levan Tsikurishvili quoted on his documentary:

"The documentary gives a very close explanation of how he felt. I'm happy and thankful that we were able to put so many of his years on film, to show others how he really was. As a collaborator, and a film-maker, that's what I can do for him. I wanted to do a brutally honest film about Tim as a person and not only about Avicii. Everybody knows Avicii but very few people know Tim. I think this documentary really shows Tim's struggle and strength of character. Being a worldwide superstar artist is not as easy as it looks on Instagram."

— Levan Tsikurishvili, director

== Release ==
Avicii: True Stories had a limited theatrical release on 26 October 2017. On 20 April 2018, Bergling killed himself while on holiday in Muscat, Oman. The documentary was released worldwide on Netflix on 28 December 2018.

== Reception ==
Review aggregator website Rotten Tomatoes reported an approval rating of 83%, based on six reviews, with an average rating of 9/10.

Joshua Speiser, writing for Film Threat, stated that the film was "well worth viewing; a portrait of an incredibly talented artist who "captured lightning in a bottle" time and again during his tragically short life." Frank Scheck, writing for The Hollywood Reporter, said that the film "delivers a visceral portrait of the personal cost that can arise from a meteoric rise to fame." Ben Kenigsberg, writing for The New York Times, described the film as "a portrait of an artist who loved making music but hated the stresses of performing", concluding: "the director, Levan Tsikurishvili, never reconciles the movie's competing impulses. It's part promotional video, part backstage doc and — in retrospect — part tragedy."

Katie Walsh, writing for the Los Angeles Times, criticized the film for not acknowledging Bergling's death at the end, concluding that "There's a sense of dread as the film wraps up, knowing where the real-life story ended, and it's increasingly out of step with the rosy picture painted by Tsikurishvili. Is he compelled to update the film or leave us with an image of Bergling in his freest moment? Ultimately, it feels like only part of the story, and therefore not entirely true."

=== Awards and nominations ===
Avicii: True Stories qualified for Oscar consideration on 1 November 2018.
