= Avicii =

Swedish DJ and music producer (1989–2018)

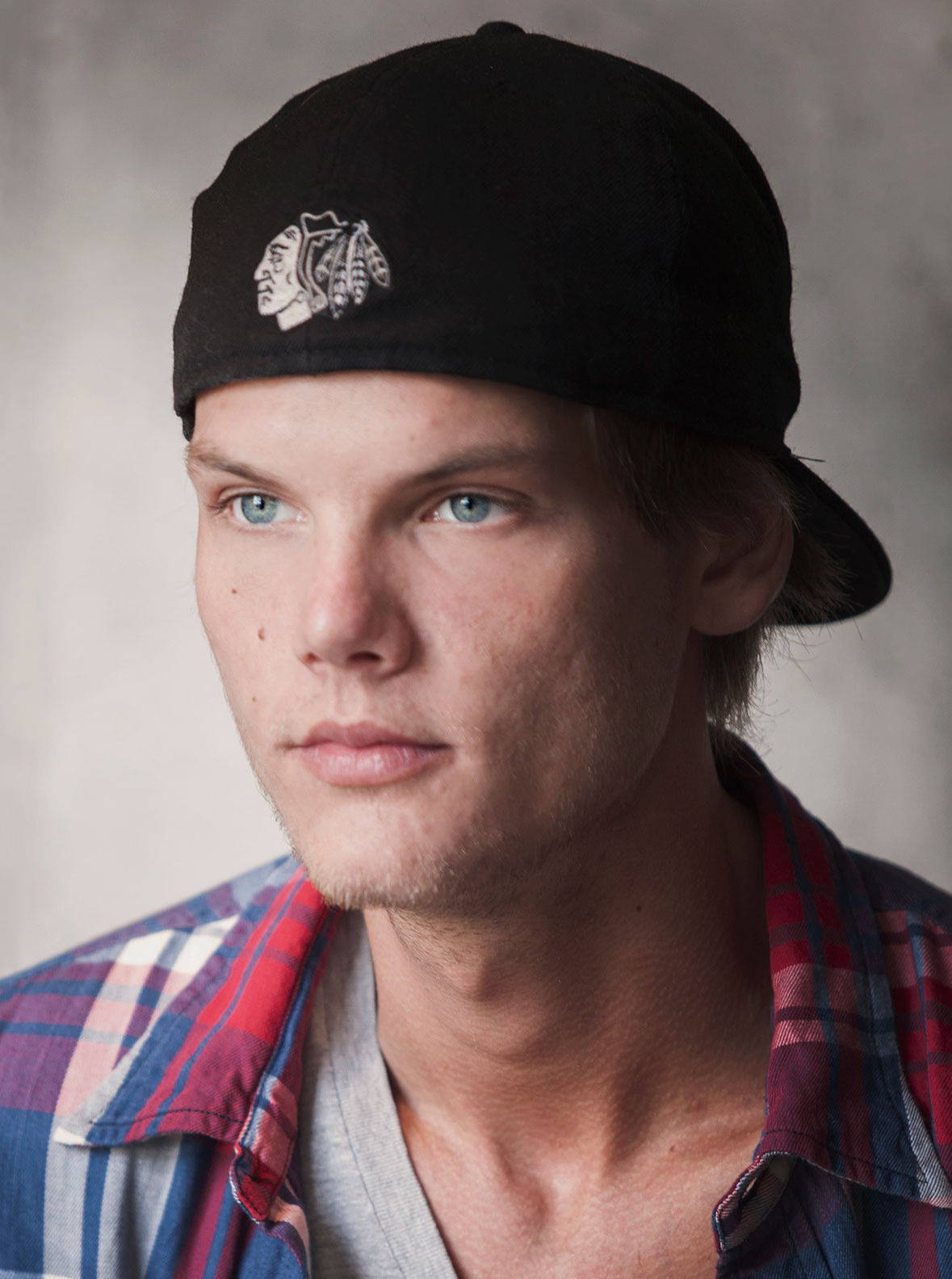
- Avicii in 2014
- Born: Tim Bergling; 8 September 1989; Stockholm, Sweden
- Died: 20 April 2018 (aged 28); Muscat, Oman
- Resting place: Hedvig Eleonora Church, Stockholm
- Other names: Tim Berg; Tom Hangs; Timberman
- Occupations: DJ; remixer; record producer
- Years active: 2006–2018
- Parents: Anki Lidén; Klas Bergling
- Relatives: Anton Körberg (half-brother); Birger Bergling (paternal grandfather)
- Awards: Full list
- Musical career
- Genres: EDM; house
- Labels: Avicii Music AB; PRMD; Universal Music AB
- Website: avicii.com

Tim Bergling (Note: Swedish pronunciation: [ˈtɪmː ˈbæ̂rjlɪŋ].) (8 September 1989 – 20 April 2018), known professionally as Avicii, (Note: Pronounced /əˈviːtʃi/ ə-VEE-chee in English, [aˈvɪ̌tːɕɪ] in Swedish) was a Swedish DJ, remixer, and record producer. His music consisted primarily of pop-oriented house music, often blended with other genres such as folk, country, bluegrass, soul, and blues. He is considered one of the most popular and successful electronic dance music (EDM) artists of all time, and was credited with "leading EDM into the mainstream" by Variety.

Avicii began posting remixes on Internet forums when he was 16 and in 2007 signed with the Dejfitts Plays record label. After winning a BBC Radio 1 competition in 2008, he signed a talent management agreement with Arash Pournouri. "Levels" (2011) was his first entry on the Billboard Hot 100. His debut studio album, True (2013), peaked in the top 10 in more than 15 countries; the lead single, "Wake Me Up", became a most-streamed song on Spotify. Both his album Stories (2015) and the EP Avīci (01) (2017) reached number one on the Swedish Sverigetopplistan chart. His third and final album, Tim (2019), was released posthumously and reached number one on the Billboard Top Dance Albums chart.

Avicii, a self-described shy person, suffered from anxiety and depression and used alcohol as a coping mechanism. In 2012, Avicii was hospitalized for 11 days in New York City with acute pancreatitis caused by alcoholism. Between 2012 and 2014, to treat pain from the pancreatitis, Avicii was prescribed opioids and became addicted. In March 2014, he underwent surgery to remove his appendix and gallbladder and entered a drug rehabilitation facility in 2015. Due to these health issues, Avicii announced his retirement from touring in March 2016. He experienced significant anxiety and in 2018, while on vacation in Muscat, Oman, Avicii died by suicide at the age of 28, using a broken wine bottle to cause "massive bleeding".

Avicii's accolades included four MTV Europe Music Awards, two International Dance Music Awards, one American Music Award, and one Billboard Music Award. He was nominated for a Grammy for his work on "Sunshine" with David Guetta in 2012 and "Levels" in 2013.

== Life and career ==
=== 1989–2010: Early life and career ===
Tim Bergling was born in Stockholm, Sweden, on 8 September 1989; he was the son of Klas Bergling, who ran an office supply business, and actress Anki Lidén. He had three siblings, one of whom is the actor Anton Körberg. At age eight, Tim started mixing music in his bedroom.

Inspired by one of his brothers who was also a DJ, Bergling began making music at the age of 16; he taught himself to use a pirated copy of FL Studio. In May 2007, Bergling signed a recording contract with the Dejfitts Plays record label. He was a member of the Laidback Luke Internet forum under the user name "Timberman", where he posted to get feedback on his music. During this period, he remixed tracks by Little Boots, Robyn, and Dizzee Rascal. Bergling adopted his moniker Avicii, a respelling of Avīci, the lowest level of naraka, or hell, in Buddhism. He chose the moniker because his real name was already in use when he created his page on Myspace.

In April 2010, under the name Tim Berg, Avicii released "Bromance", an instrumental track, via Joia Records, a Swedish independent dance label. After the track became popular, in October 2010, Avicii added vocal elements from Samuele Sartini's track "Love U Seek" (featuring singer Amanda Wilson) to the track and released the song "Seek Bromance" via Ministry of Sound under license from Sirup Music. It reached the top 20 in several countries, including Belgium, France, the Netherlands, the United Kingdom, and Sweden. In 2010, he signed with the European A&R team at EMI Music Publishing.

=== 2011–2013: "Levels" ===
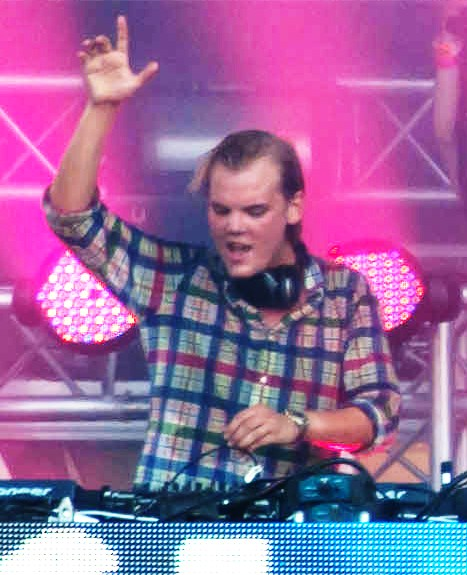
Avicii at the Inox Festival in September 2011

"Fade into Darkness", which samples a track from Penguin Cafe Orchestra, was released in July 2011. Leona Lewis sampled the track on her single "Collide", released in August 2011. The samples were not credited to Avicii as he thought Lewis was only going to sample the original track by Penguin Cafe Orchestra. Avicii then attempted to legally block the release of the single; Lewis agreed to give Avicii credits on her track.

In October 2011, Avicii released "Levels", which launched him into the mainstream. "Levels" reached the top ten in 15 countries. The song is considered to be his "career-making early signature song".

Avicii's collaboration track "Sunshine" with David Guetta was nominated for a Grammy Award for Best Dance Recording in February 2012 but lost to "Scary Monsters And Nice Sprites" by Skrillex. In April 2012, he released "Silhouettes", which features vocals from Salem Al Fakir. It charted in several European countries.

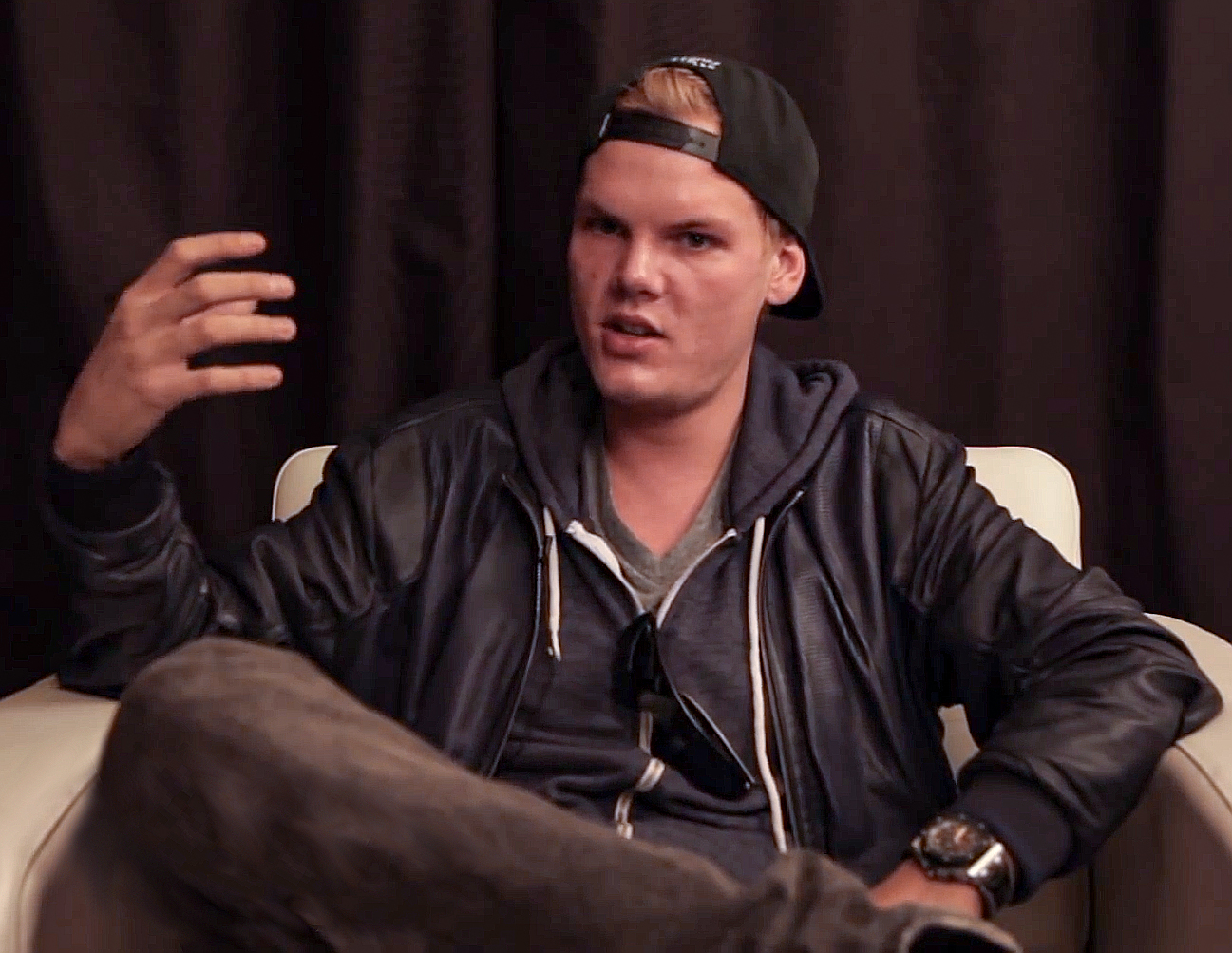
Avicii during an interview in May 2012

In June 2012, after reaching two million followers on Facebook, Avicii released "Two Million".

In August 2012, Avicii performed at the 2012 Lollapalooza festival in Grant Park in Chicago. He toured the U.S. that summer, playing bigger venues than on his previous tour, but the tour was regarded as a flop as many seats were empty.

Also in August 2012, he released "Dancing in My Head" (Avicii's 'Been Cursed' Mix), featuring vocals from Eric Turner, on Beatport.

In September 2012, Avicii became the first DJ to headline Radio City Music Hall. At his performance at Radio City Music Hall, he gave a preview of "Stay with You," a collaboration with Mike Posner. In November 2012, Avicii's song "Last Dance" was released.

In December 2012, Avicii released the song "I Could Be the One", a collaboration with Nicky Romero that features Noonie Bao on vocals. The single entered at number one on the UK Singles Chart on 17 February 2013―for the week ending 23 February 2013―becoming both Avicii's and Nicky Romero's first chart-topping single in Britain.

In January 2013, Avicii partnered with Ericsson to create the world's first "crowdsourced" hit song. It led to the song "X You", released in February 2013; Avicii acted as executive producer and created the song. Also in January 2013, Avicii released "Three Million" featuring Negin to celebrate his Facebook page reaching three million followers.

In February 2013, at the 55th Annual Grammy Awards, Avicii was nominated for Grammy Award for Best Dance/Electronic Recording for "Levels".

From late February to early March 2013, Avicii toured Australia as a headline act in the Future Music Festival alongside The Prodigy and The Stone Roses. In late February 2013, he embarked on his first South American tour, with concerts in Argentina, Colombia, Brazil, and Chile.

=== 2013–2014: True ===
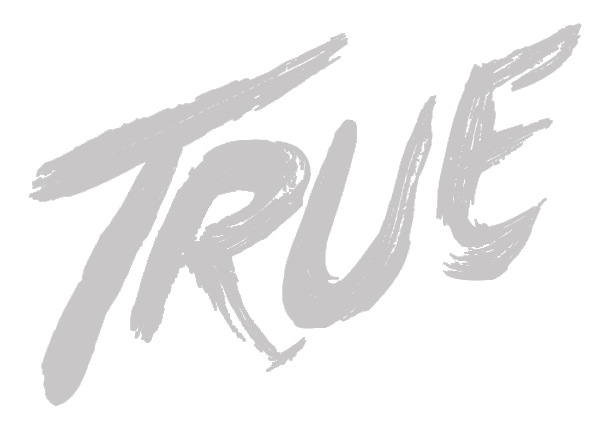
Avicii's logo for his album True

In March 2013, during his Main Stage set at the Ultra Music Festival in Miami, Avicii premiered new experimental tracks from his upcoming album True, with a live band including Mac Davis, Dan Tyminski, Audra Mae, Aloe Blacc, Mike Einziger, Ben Kenney, and Jose Pasillis II. Many of the new songs received mixed critical reviews; the audience "booed" him as it was not the house music that they expected. That same month, Avicii won Best Artist (Solo) at the 28th Annual International Dance Music Awards.

In April 2013, Avicii and ex-ABBA members Björn Ulvaeus and Benny Andersson composed the anthem for the Eurovision Song Contest 2013. The song was performed for the first time in the final in May 2013. In June 2013, "Wake Me Up", featuring vocals from Aloe Blacc was released. It peaked at number one on the Spotify Global Chart, and Avicii was the second-most-streamed artist worldwide. "Wake Me Up" spent 14 weeks as the number one hit on the Billboard Hot Dance/Electronic Songs chart, a record at that time. "Wake Me Up" sold 267,000 copies in its first week on sale and overtook Robin Thicke's "Blurred Lines" as the UK's fastest-selling single of 2013. The song peaked at number one in 22 countries.

In August 2013, Avicii performed "Lay Me Down" with Nile Rodgers and Adam Lambert at Rodgers's fundraiser, "All For The East End". The song, which was released the following month, features Lambert on vocals and Rodgers on guitar.

True was released in September 2013. The single "Hey Brother", with vocals by Dan Tyminski, was released in October. That same month, DJ Mag ranked Avicii third on the 2013 list of "Top 100 DJs".

In November 2013, Avicii won his first award—"Best Electronic"—at the MTV Europe Music Awards. That same month he won the American Music Award for Favorite Electronic Dance Music Artist.

In December 2013, Avicii released the album's fourth single, "Addicted to You", with vocals by Audra Mae.

In February 2014, his song "Wake Me Up" was Spotify's most-streamed song and became the first song to ever exceed 200 million listeners on the platform. "Wake Me Up" remained the most-streamed song on the platform for 506 days until it was overtaken by English singer-songwriter Ed Sheeran's song "Thinking Out Loud" in May 2015.

In March 2014, Avicii released a remixed edition of his album True titled True: Avicii By Avicii, containing his remixes of all the tracks except "Heart Upon My Sleeve". The album's promotion was supposed to begin at the 2014 Ultra Music Festival, but Avicii was hospitalised on 28 March and was unable to play his closing set at the festival.

In April 2014, in collaboration with Carlos Santana, Wyclef Jean, and Alexandre Pires, Avicii released the official 2014 FIFA World Cup anthem, "Dar um Jeito (We Will Find a Way)", which was performed at the closing ceremony in July 2014. It was also included on the album 2014 FIFA World Cup, which was released in the US in May 2014.

In May 2014, "Wake Me Up" was nominated for Top Radio Song and won Top Dance/Electronic Song at the 2014 Billboard Music Awards.

Avicii collaborated with Chris Martin from Coldplay, co-writing, co-producing, and playing piano for the track "A Sky Full of Stars" from the band's sixth studio album, Ghost Stories, which was released in May 2014.

"Lovers on the Sun", a track Avicii co-produced with David Guetta, was released in June 2014.

In 2014, Avicii collaborated with Madonna to produce the tracks "Wash All Over Me" and "Rebel Heart" for her 2015 album, Rebel Heart; the tracks were leaked in December 2014.

=== 2014–2015: Stories ===
Logo of Avicii's album Stories

In July 2014, Avicii told Rolling Stone his next album, Stories, would include collaborations with Jon Bon Jovi, Serj Tankian of System of a Down, Chris Martin, Wyclef Jean, and Matisyahu. Avicii described the album as "a lot more song-oriented".

"Lose Myself", a collaboration between Avicii and Chinese singer Wang Leehom, was released on 1 September 2014. The song was created as the theme song for the Storm Electronic Music Festival in Shanghai. On 8 September 2014, Avicii's 25th birthday, he decided to cancel his remaining performances that year due to health concerns. Still, the following day he announced through the release of a new single, "The Days" later in 2014; the song is a collaboration between Avicii and Robbie Williams and was released as the first single from Avicii's album Stories on 3 October 2014. On 17 November 2014, Wyclef Jean released a track titled "Divine Sorrow" featuring Avicii that was part of Product Red's campaign "Share the Sound of an AIDS-Free Generation".

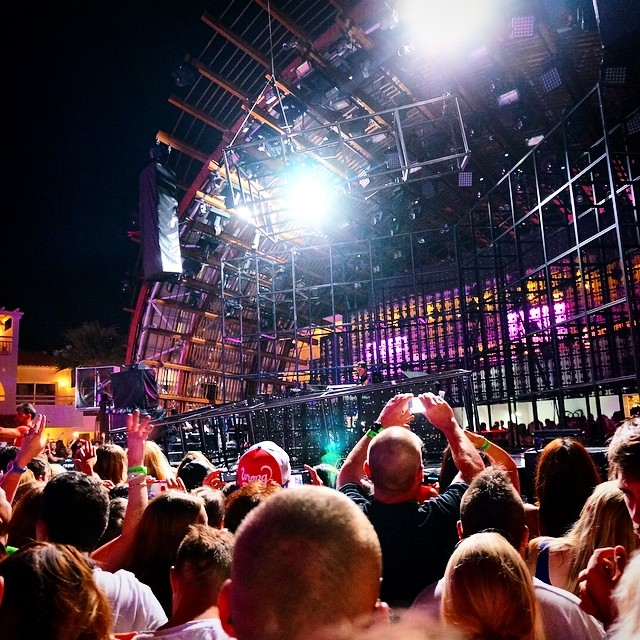
Avicii performing at Ushuaïa Nightclub in August 2014

On 2 March 2015, Avicii performed his upcoming single "Heaven" with Chris Martin on vocals live at Australia's Future Music Festival. On 27 March, during his live performance at Ultra Music Festival in Miami, Avicii premiered new tracks from Stories, and in April 2015, he released three full sets on the Internet, which included "Heaven", "Waiting for Love", and some of his IDs: "For a Better Day", "City Lights", "Can't Catch Me", "True Believer", "What Would I Change It To", "Can't Love You Again" (previously leaked on the Internet under the name "Don't Call"), and "Attack".

On 6 May 2015, Avicii released a rework of Nina Simone's version of "Feeling Good". By August, Avicii was ranked sixth on Forbes's list of "The World's Highest-Paid DJs 2015", with earnings of US$19 million.

That same month, the Swedish newspaper Göteborgs-Posten confirmed through an interview with Avicii that his second album, Stories, would be released in late 2015. In July 2015, Avicii premiered the album's track "Broken Arrows" featuring Zac Brown of the Zac Brown Band, on Episode 37 of the podcast LE7ELS. On 18 July 2015, Avicii announced he had finished production on Stories after two years of work. On 4 August 2015, it was announced the final singles before the release of Stories would be "For a Better Day" featuring American singer Alex Ebert, and "Pure Grinding" featuring vocals from Kristoffer Fogelmark and Earl St. Clair. "For a Better Day" and "Pure Grinding" were released on 28 August.

In September, Avicii's representatives announced to Billboard he would postpone all remaining tour dates for 2015, citing a hectic touring schedule and the pressures of releasing Stories. That same month, Avicii announced the release of "Stories – Megamix" on the music-streaming platform Spotify. Stories was released on 2 October 2015; it reached number one on the Swedish Sverigetopplistan chart, the Norwegian VG-lista chart, and the US Billboard Top Dance Albums chart. In November, Avicii stated on Quora it was "highly likely" a new album would be released in 2016.

=== 2016: Retirement from touring ===
Avicii's logo, which he used throughout his career

In 2016, Avicii's commercial success continued: a report by Inc. magazine listed Avicii Music AB as the sixth-fastest-growing company in Europe, with a revenue of €7.7 million in 2014. Commercial enterprises that year included a partnership with The Coca-Cola Company on a global campaign song, "Taste the Feeling", featuring Australian singer Conrad Sewell. The song became the theme for Coca-Cola's UEFA Euro 2016 campaign. On 19 March 2016, at Ultra Music Festival, Avicii debuted a "treasure trove of new music", according to We Rave You, "Faster Than Light", "Without You", "Our Love" and "Unbreakable". but ten days later, Avicii posted on his website that he would be retiring from touring later that year, citing health concerns.

Studio work continued, though. Avicii was working on his third studio album, and in April performed in Dubai, as part of his final shows; he performed an unreleased track, "All I Need", featuring Australian singer-songwriter Sia. On 3 June 2016, Avicii released a collaboration with Otto Knows titled "Back Where I Belong". On 28 August 2016, Avicii performed his final show at Ushuaïa Ibiza Beach Hotel.

In December 2016, a representative of Avicii Music AB announced Avicii was no longer working with his long-time manager Arash Pournouri, At Night Management, and Pournouri's record label PRMD, and that Avicii had signed with Universal Music Sweden and was expected to release his third studio album in 2017.

=== 2017–2018: Avīci (01) and Avicii: True Stories ===
In August 2017, Avicii released the six-track EP Avīci (01), which reached number one on the Swedish Sverigetopplistan chart. The two singles from the album, "Without You" and "Lonely Together", reached number one and number three on the Swedish chart. In November, a remix package for "Lonely Together" was released, featuring remixes by Alan Walker, DJ Licious, Jaded, and Dexter.

In an interview with Pete Tong on BBC Radio 1, Avicii stated the EP is one of three parts of his third studio album. In September 2017, Avicii announced a documentary directed by his long-time collaborator Levan Tsikurishvili titled Avicii: True Stories, which chronicles Avicii's retirement from touring. He continued cooperating into 2018. On January 4, American singer Anderson East released the single "Girlfriend", which was co-written with Avicii for Anderson's album Encore. On 10 February 2018, Avicii released "Ghost", a collaboration with Swedish singer-songwriter Daniel Adams-Ray.

Following Avicii's death that April, news outlets reported that at the time of his death, he had over 200 unreleased songs, some finished and others still in development; it was suggested his unreleased material comprised some of his best work. In August 2018, producer Carl Falk, who co-produced some songs on Stories in 2015 and Avīci (01) in 2017, stated he was finalising the Chris Martin collaboration "Heaven" (originally written during the Stories sessions) and that it might be released in a few months, along with Avicii's third album.

=== Posthumous releases and tributes ===
The album Tim, which Avicii was working on just before his death, was released in June 2019, with a lead single, "SOS" released on 10 April. All proceeds from the sale of the album went towards the Tim Bergling Foundation. Two more singles released from the album, "Tough Love" and "Heaven". The music video for "Heaven" includes clips of Avicii holidaying in Madagascar after his retirement from touring in 2016. On 27 June, Billboard cited "Heaven" as one of the best dance songs of the first half of 2019.

In October, the release of the video game Avicii Invector was announced. Gameplay would include single and multiplayer versions, and players would recreate 25 of Avicii's songs. A portion of the profits was to be donated to the Tim Bergling Foundation. Rebecca May of The Guardian rated the game 4/5 stars, describing it as "an immersive musical tribute". In November, Avicii won Best Swedish Act at the 2019 MTV Europe Music Awards, his third win after 2013 and 2018. A tribute concert version of "Fades Away" featuring singer MishCatt was released on December 5.

On 24 January 2020, the single "Forever Yours", a collaboration with Kygo and Sandro Cavazza, was released. The song was first performed at Ultra Music Festival in 2016. Kygo and Sandro Cavazza performed the song live at the Avicii Tribute Concert at Stockholm's Friends Arena in December 2019. On 15 February, Tiësto premiered three unreleased Avicii singles on his radio show Tiësto's Club Life: a fifth collaboration with Aloe Blacc called "I Wanna Be Free", a fifth collaboration with Sandro Cavazza called "We Burn", and a fifth collaboration with Wyclef Jean called "Now That We Found Love". In April, Avicii's album Tim won Best Album at the 2020 International Dance Music Awards.

In June, "Wake Me Up" was certified diamond by the Recording Industry Association of America (RIAA). On October 30, 2020, the American singer Cam released the track "The Otherside", which Avicii co-wrote. The version included on the eponymous album does not feature the DJ's original instrumentals, which were removed to align with the album's country style, but it retains the lyrics written by Avicii. A biography titled Tim – The Official Biography of Avicii was released in the UK and North America on 16 November 2021. Kitty Empire of The Guardian described it as "An honest study of the shy young man turned superstar DJ". A second tribute concert was held at the Avicii Arena on 1 December, and a third tribute concert, titled "Together for a Better Day", was held at the same venue on 6 December 2023.

On 14 February 2024, Zac Brown Band's lead singer, Zac Brown, announced Avicii's remix of their song "Beautiful Drug" would be released on 16 February. On 19 April, it was announced the documentary Avicii – I'm Tim would premiere at the Tribeca Festival on 9 June 2024. Directed by Henrik Burman, the film features interviews with David Guetta, Chris Martin, Nile Rodgers, and others. On 23 May, a SiriusXM radio channel titled "Avicii Radio: Music for a Better Day" was launched.

On June 14, Swedish author Mörs Mosesson published a photo book depicting Avicii's childhood and life, The Life and Music of Tim Bergling, proceeds from which were donated to the Tim Bergling Foundation. At the end of 2024, Netflix released Avicii's final live performance, titled Avicii: My Last Show, which took place on 28 August 2016 at Ushuaïa Ibiza Beach Hotel. The performance was simultaneously released with the documentary Avicii – I'm Tim.

On February 14, 2025, the single "Forever Yours (Tim's 2016 Ibiza Version)" was released. The song was finished in 2016, but since the documentary's release, pressure to release the song has increased. A "Creative Journey" video was posted on the same day as the song's release; it features rare studio footage of Avicii listening to the demo with friends and performing it at his last concert. A greatest hits album, Avicii Forever, was released on 16 May 2025. On November 6, the first episode of the documentary "Stories on Stories" was released on the video-sharing website YouTube. The three-part series includes previously unseen archival footage of studio sessions from 2014 and 2015 that produced some songs on Stories (2015). Episode Two was released on 4 December.

== Work ==
=== Influences ===
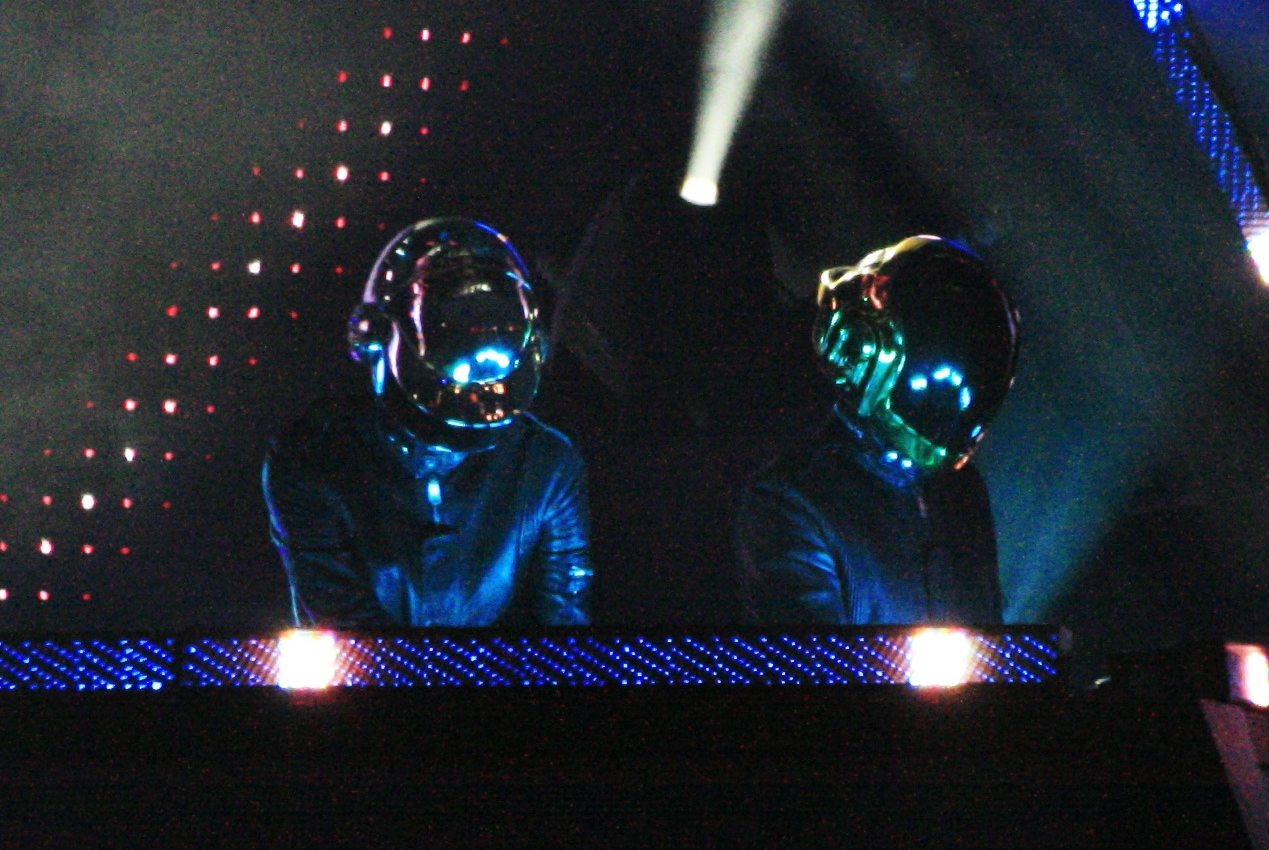
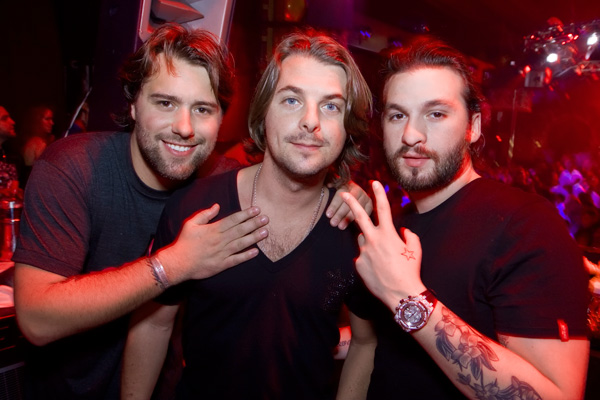
Daft Punk (top) and Swedish House Mafia (bottom) were both influences on Avicii's music.

On his influences, Avicii has stated:

Initially when starting out, sound-wise it was mostly the Swedish house producers, mainly Eric Prydz and Axwell, but also Steve Angello and Seb Ingrosso. Nowadays for some, this is quite a different question. Id say the musicians that has influenced me the most in terms of lyrics, melody and arrangement has been: Earth wind and fire, Ray Charles, Stevie Wonder, Nina Simone, Etta James, Coldplay, [Red Hot Chili Peppers], [System of a Down], Paul Simon, Michael Jackson, Smokey Robinson, Little Dragon, Of Monsters and Men, Mumford and Sons, The Beatles, Nile Rodgers – I could go on forever here (Guess I kind of already have :) – BUT my production, meaning the electronic music that is always there, sometimes more apparent and sometimes not as much, I still owe to Eric Prydz, [Swedish House Mafia] and Daft Punk.

=== Musical style ===
Avicii's early work was in deep house and progressive house styles, usually based on a four-chord structure, sub-bass, and a simple synth melody. His debut studio album, True, blends musical genres, including folktronica. While making the album, Avicii wanted to fuse electronic music with soul, funk, blues, folk, and country because he felt EDM had become too focused on "dirty drops". Its first single, "Wake Me Up", is a folk music crossover, which, according to Katie Bain of The Observer, "tapped into the market potential of mixing EDM and country, a template many artists have since recreated". A Variety editor commented Avicii's "distinct sound" consists of "soaring synths and keening melodies". Ian Youngs of the BBC noted Avicii's biggest hits have elements in common: "insistent, escapist" house music production, guest vocals to "lend accessibility and depth", and "irresistible" melodies. Musicians such as Kygo, Skrillex, Diplo, Gryffin, Martin Garrix, and Cheat Codes cited Avicii as a source of inspiration.

== Philanthropy ==
In 2011, after achieving widespread commercial success, Avicii began working with his manager and executive producer Ash Pournouri to start House for Hunger, a charity dedicated to alleviating global hunger. The goal was to raise $1 million from ticket sales for a 25-date US tour that began in January. The goal was reached, and the funds were donated to Feeding America. In early 2013, Avicii donated all proceeds from his "Avicii X You" project to House for Hunger.

That same year, Avicii partnered with Macy's to sell a $20 "Play Button" pin, a wearable MP3 player with 1.8 GB of free storage and a playlist that included Avicii, Moby, Hardwell, and Nicky Romero. As part of this initiative, $60,000 was donated to the FEED Foundation. In 2014, Avicii lent support to HIV/AIDS organisations. In November, he collaborated with Product Red to launch the "Ultimate Year of Music with Avicii". That same month, Wyclef Jean released the song "Divine Sorrow", featuring Avicii, with proceeds going to the Product Red Global Fund. He also supported campaigns against human trafficking and gang violence when he directed the videos for his tracks "For a Better Day" and "Pure Grinding".

== Personal life ==
=== Relationships ===
Avicii met Emily Goldberg, an American student, in 2011; they dated for two years. He then dated Racquel Bettencourt, a Canadian student and model with whom he lived in California; the couple separated in late 2014. On the podcast Sofia with an F, Bettencourt said she and Avicii restarted their relationship in 2016; a pregnancy resulted in a miscarriage. At the time of his death, he was dating Tereza Kačerová, a Czech model; they kept their relationship private.

=== Health ===
When Avicii was a teenager, he smoked marijuana for the first time, leading to feelings of paranoia and derealization. Avicii confessed his substance use to his parents and expressed concern of a psychosis. They took him to a child psychologist.

Avicii suffered from anxiety and depression. He was self-conscious of his appearance, specifically his nose and acne. As a shy person, being recognized by fans in public, performing, and a grueling tour schedule led him to drink alcohol as a coping mechanism. He also had poor eating habits and did not sleep much. He wore caps because he thought his hair looked bad.

"I just got into a habit, because you rely on that encouragement and self-confidence you get from alcohol, and then you get dependent on it." - Avicii in 2013

In January 2012, Avicii was hospitalised for 11 days in New York City with acute pancreatitis that was caused by alcoholism. Between 2012 and 2014, Avicii was prescribed opioids for the pain caused by his pancreatitis, including OxyContin and Vicodin, to which he developed an addiction. To wean himself off the addiction, in 2014, he began taking buprenorphine/naloxone, a milder opioid. He said that "Of course, I didn't listen to the majority of doctors". In addition to changing his habits, doctors recommended that Avicii have his gallbladder removed; however, he put off the surgery due to a busy schedule. As a result, his appendix ruptured.

In March 2014, Avicii underwent surgery and had both his appendix and gallbladder removed.

In 2015, his father, his manager Ash Pournouri and his tour manager, his bodyguard, and his older brother staged an intervention for him in Ibiza. After several hours of resistance, Avicii agreed to enter a drug rehabilitation facility.

He announced in March 2016 he would be retiring from touring. In the documentary Avicii: True Stories (2017), directed by his close and longtime collaborator Levan Tsikurishvili, Avicii spoke about his physical and mental health struggles. The documentary depicts the pressure from his management to continue performing live in spite of his objections.

Following his retirement, Avicii took up Transcendental Meditation, which he credited with reducing his anxiety, and started seeing a therapist. In the summer of 2017, he traveled to the Amazon rainforest in Peru to drink ayahuasca. Before his death, he was working with a trainer, eating healthy foods, studying philosophy, and meditating. He read Science of Being and Art of Living by Maharishi Mahesh Yogi.

Avicii's manager, Arash Pournouri, said he knew of Avicii's anxieties but refused to label them a problem of mental health. His management team became aware of Avicii's painkiller addiction in November 2014, and they staged two unsuccessful interventions for him. Pournouri rescheduled many shows to allow Avicii to recover in Stockholm. Having discovered his client's alcoholism, Pournouri forbade promoters from offering Avicii alcohol, clearing out his minibar and focusing on his recovery. Issues worsened when there was no crew to stop Avicii during his recuperation. Pournouri met with Avicii's father, Klas, in 2014 to share concerns about Avicii's health.

Pournouri claimed to have cancelled two more world tours, against Avicii's wishes, which would have earned up to approximately US$2.9 million in profits.

=== Residence ===
In 2013, Avicii bought a 7,000 square-foot house on one-third of an acre in Hollywood Hills for $15.5 million. It was sold for $17.5 million just after his death.

== Death ==
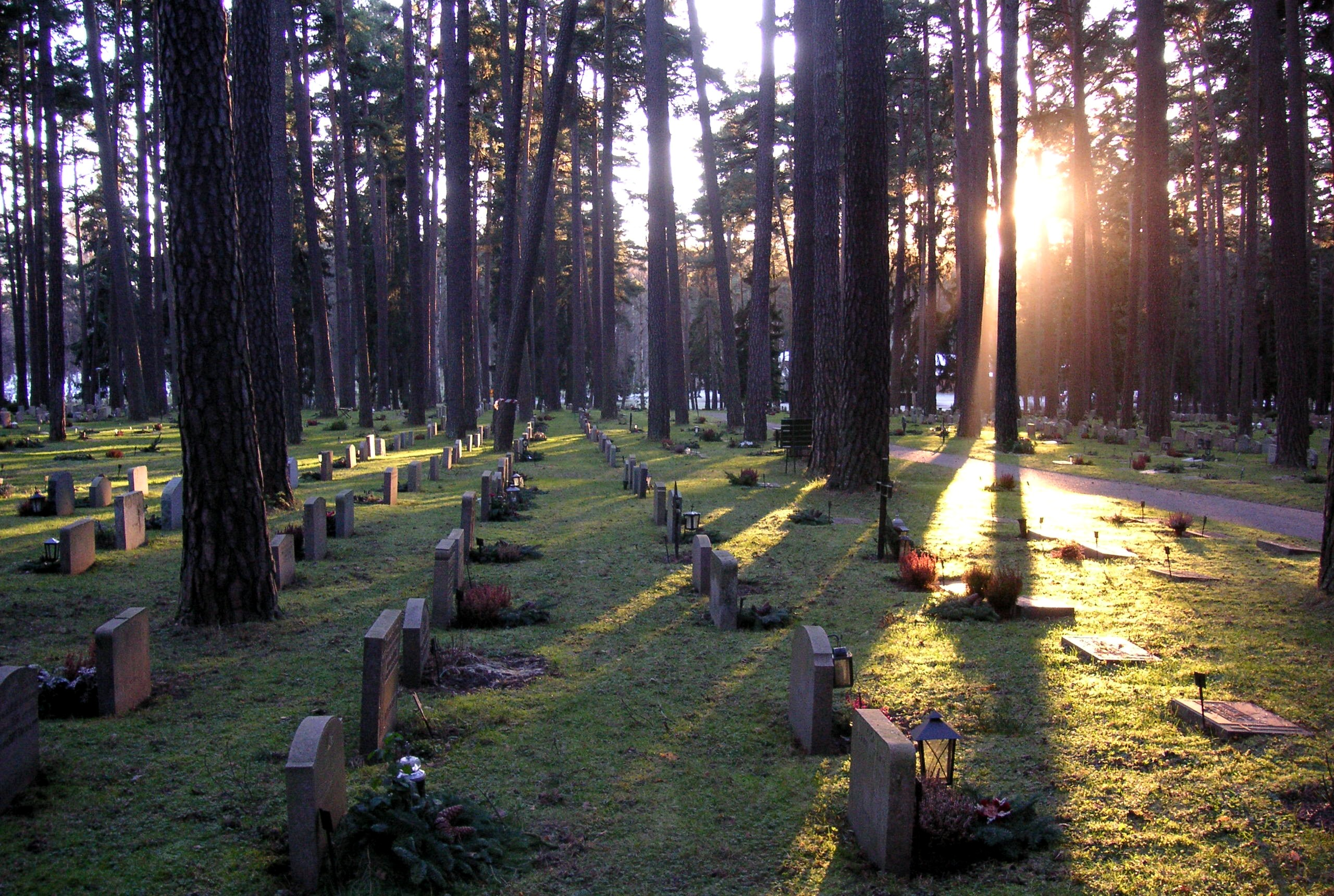
Tim Bergling's funeral service was held at Skogskyrkogården cemetery.

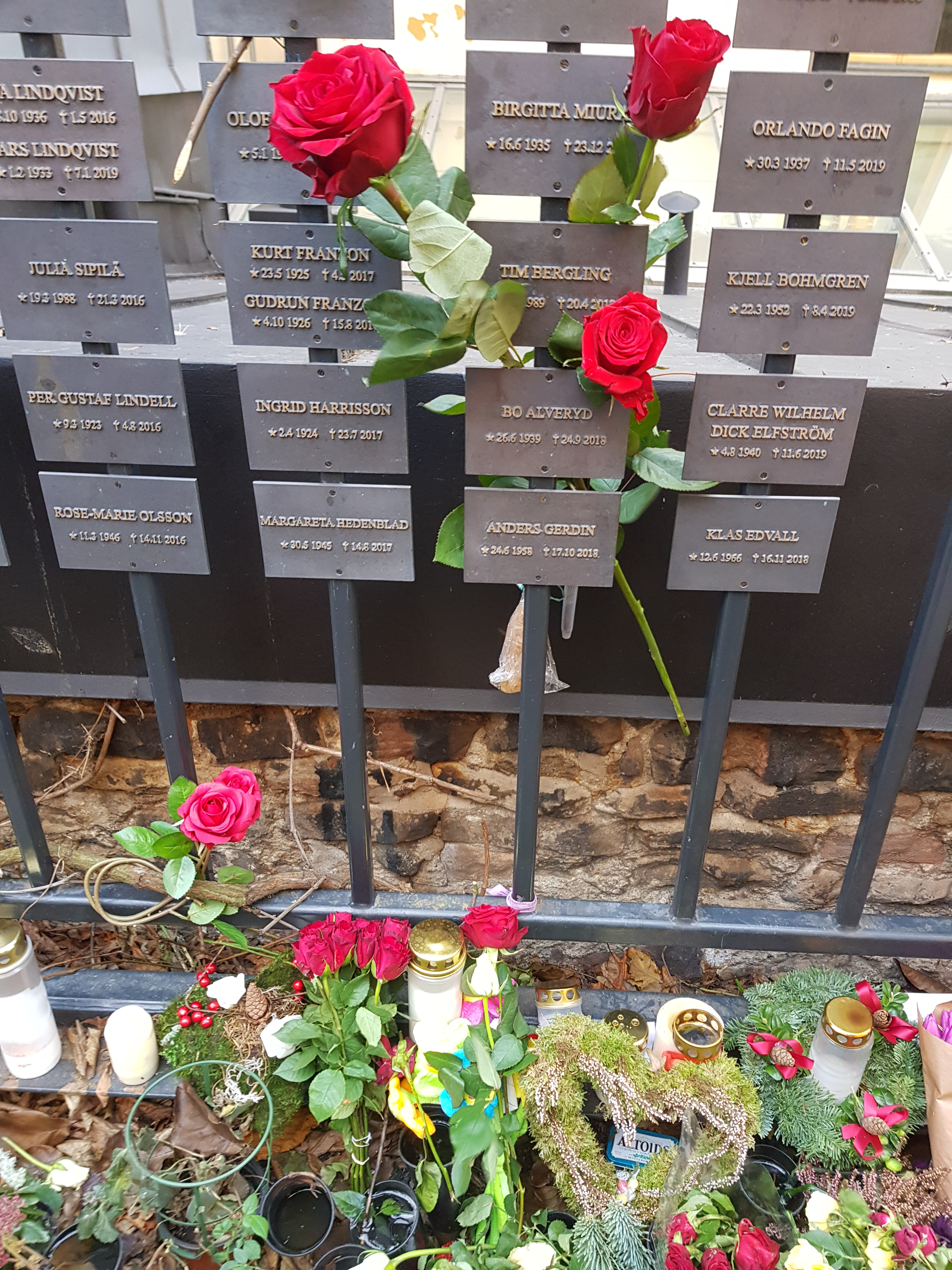
A plaque in memory of Bergling, among others, at Hedvig Eleonora Church, where his cremated remains are buried

Avicii was stressed due to high pressure from management and fans to continue touring and maintaining his public persona. He experienced significant anxiety over the possibility of disappointing his fans and was deeply affected by the "flood of hate mail" he received after cancelled performances.

On 8 April 2018, Avicii traveled to Muscat, Oman for a vacation, where he visited friends in the country’s royal family, the Al Bu Said dynasty. A day after arriving, he held a conference call with members of his management team to discuss which guest artists he wanted to recruit for new music. He also posed for photos with fans at the Muscat Hills Resort and went kite-surfing and sailing with friends.

In a conversation with Avicii's father on the day before Avicii's death, a friend expressed concern about Bergling's mental state and his meditations and noted that he wasn't eating or speaking. The last post in Avicii's diary read: "The shedding of the soul is the last attachment, before it restarts!". After a worrisome conversation with Avicii, his brother reportedly flew to Oman to attempt to "bring him home".

On 20 April 2018, at a luxury estate and private farmhouse owned by the Al Bu Said dynasty in Muscat, Avicii died by suicide at the age of 28, using a broken wine bottle to cause "massive bleeding".

The Royal Oman Police carried out two autopsies and announced on 21 April there was "no criminal suspicion" or evidence of foul play in Avicii's death.

A private funeral service was held on 8 June 2018 at Skogskyrkogården cemetery in Stockholm, only attended by close friends and immediate family. His body was cremated and his remains were buried later that month in an ash grave at Hedvig Eleonora Church, near where Avicii grew up.

=== Estate ===
Avicii died without a will and testament. Per Swedish law, his assets, including financial assets valued at $25.5 million/£20 million/SEK231 million after settling debts and paying expenses, went to his parents. In September 2022, Avicii's family sold 75% of his master recordings and publishing rights to Pophouse Entertainment; they retained a 25% interest to maintain some creative control over use. The deal was estimated to be worth "nine figures", or over $100 million, and proceeds were donated to the Tim Bergling Foundation to ensure that it will be able to fund its general expenses in the long term.

=== Tributes ===
==== From his family ====
Bergling's family released an open letter stating:

Our beloved Tim was a seeker, a fragile artistic soul searching for answers to existential questions. An over-achieving perfectionist who travelled and worked hard at a pace that led to extreme stress. When he stopped touring, he wanted to find a balance in life to be able to be happy and to do what he loved most – music. He really struggled with thoughts about Meaning, Life, Happiness. He could now not go on any longer. He wanted to find peace. Tim was not made for the business machine he found himself in; he was a sensitive guy who loved his fans but shunned the spotlight. Tim, you will forever be loved and sadly missed. The person you were and your music will keep your memory alive. We love you, The Family.

==== From fellow musicians ====
Several hours after learning of Avicii's death, Kygo concluded his set at Coachella by playing "Without You" in memory of Avicii. Onstage, Kygo described Avicii as "a true musical genius".

Two days later, OneRepublic paid tribute to Avicii by performing his song "Wake Me Up" during their show in Mumbai, India.

At the 2018 Billboard Music Awards, The Chainsmokers and Halsey paid tribute to Avicii, including an emotional discussion about mental health, before presenting the winner of the Top Hot 100 Song.

In May 2018, Tiësto played a medley of Avicii's songs at EDC Las Vegas. Aloe Blacc joined Tiësto on stage to perform "Wake Me Up".

At BBC Radio 1's Big Weekend in May 2018, Rita Ora, Avicii's most recent collaborator, described him as "a really good friend" who "changed [her] life". Ora paid similar tributes at King's Day and Capital's Summertime Ball.

At the 2018 edition of Tomorrowland, which Michael Thivaios (Like Mike) described as Avicii's home, DJs Axwell Λ Ingrosso, Don Diablo, Nicky Romero, Dimitri Vegas & Like Mike, and Zedd played his music in their sets. Thivaios referred to Avicii as "one of [his] best friends" and "a great inspiration". Avicii's songs "Levels" and "Wake Me Up" came second and eighth, respectively, in Tomorrowland 2018's most-played songs.

In July 2018, Arty released a song called "Tim" as a tribute to Avicii.

At Creamfields in 2018, Kaleidoscope Orchestra performed a special tribute consisting of Avicii's greatest dance hits.

In October 2018, Vicetone released "South Beach" a tribute song influenced by Avicii's music.

Upon his death in May 2018, artists including Eric Prydz, Imagine Dragons, Skrillex, Calvin Harris, Hardwell, Deadmau5, Marshmello, Zedd, and Robbie Williams paid tribute to Avicii on Twitter.

One year after his death, tributes on social media were paid by Nicky Romero, DJ Snake, Nile Rodgers, the organisers of Tomorrowland, and others.

In 2019, Madonna paid tribute to Avicii in her song "Funana" from her album Madame X.

In April 2020, Aloe Blacc hosted a 24-hour, livestreamed tribute to Avicii on his YouTube channel; the tribute included concert footage, videos, DJ interviews, and fan duets.

In November 2021, Basshunter recorded the song "Life Speaks to Me" as a tribute to Avicii.

==== Other tributes ====
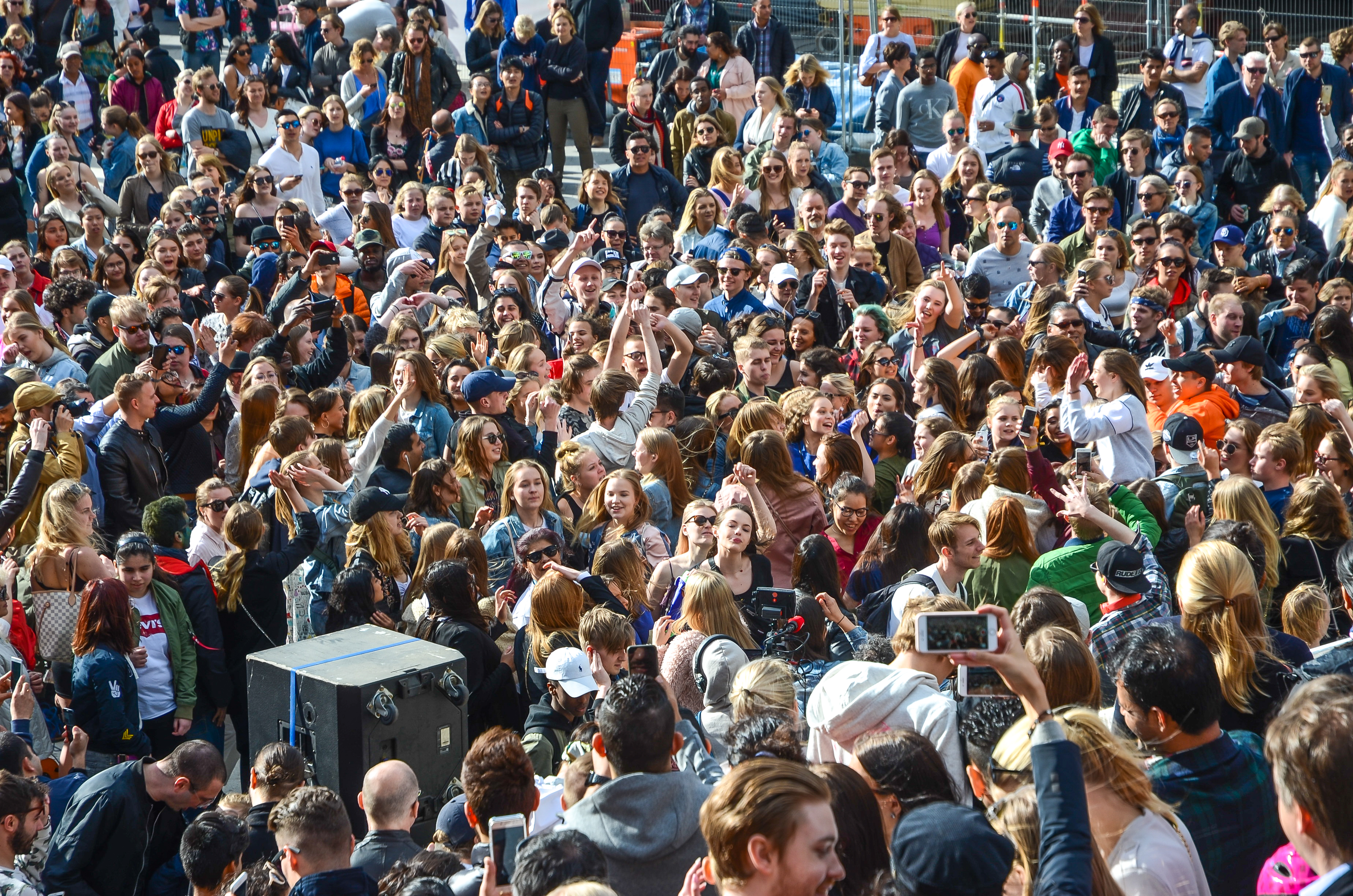
A fan memorial gathering in Stockholm, Sweden, the day following Avicii's death

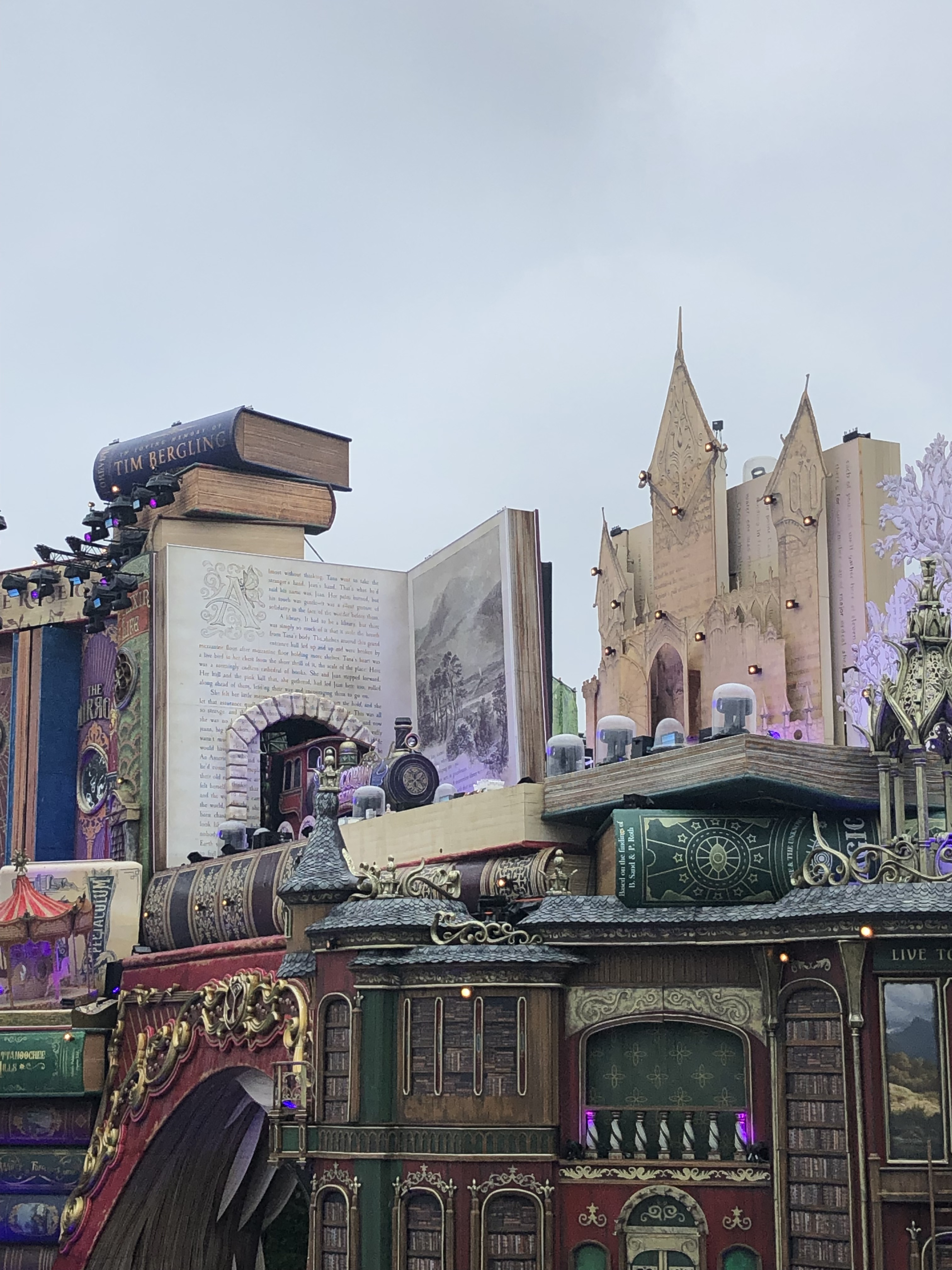
A giant book in tribute to Avicii (top left of image) as part of the Tomorrowland main stage in 2019

In April 2018, Malgosia Fiebig played a collection of Avicii's songs on the carillon of bells within the Dom Tower of Utrecht.

In May 2018, during the first night of the finale of the 14th season of The Voice, coach Alicia Keys performed Avicii's "Wake Me Up" as part of her coach duet with the last remaining artist on her team, Britton Buchanan.

In November 2018, Bergling's family organised a public memorial service at Hedvig Eleonora Church in Stockholm, Sweden. Hundreds of fans filled the church to mourn and pay their respects. The service featured an orchestral choir that played music linked to events in Avicii's life and ended with a version of his 2013 song "Wake Me Up".

At the 61st Annual Grammy Awards in February 2019, tributes were set aside for Avicii, Mac Miller, and Aretha Franklin, who all died in 2018.

In April 2019, a billboard on Sunset Boulevard in Los Angeles, California, included the words "TIM BERGLING: 1989 – FOREVER" underneath the Avicii logo.

In April 2019, the Mounted Royal Guards and the Life Guards' Dragoon Music Corps of the Swedish Army paid tribute to Avicii during a ceremony at Stockholm Palace, where brass renditions of his songs "Without You", "Hey Brother" and "Wake Me Up" were played.

The 2019 edition of Tomorrowland included a tribute in the decoration of the festival's main stage. The theme was books; one of the books had the words: "In loving memory of Tim Bergling".

In October 2019, Madame Tussauds in New York City revealed a wax figure of Avicii.

In December 2019, a sold-out tribute concert was held in Stockholm featuring David Guetta, Kygo, Dimitri Vegas & Like Mike, Nicky Romero, and Laidback Luke headlining, along with vocalists with whom Avicii had worked, playing alongside a 30-piece orchestra, fulfilling one of Avicii's dreams for his music in a live setting. All profits went to the Tim Bergling Foundation.

In May 2021, the Ericsson Globe in Stockholm was renamed the Avicii Arena. To commemorate the new name, the Royal Stockholm Philharmonic Orchestra recorded a performance of the Avicii song "For a Better Day", with vocals provided by Ella Tiritiello.

In April 2023, five years after his death, Avicii's biggest hits and the album Stories were played all day on Tomorrowland's One World Radio.

In July 2025, a memorial space was set up at Tomorrowland called "Avicii Forever: The Tribute", where fans watched exclusive and archived footage of Avicii.

== Legacy ==
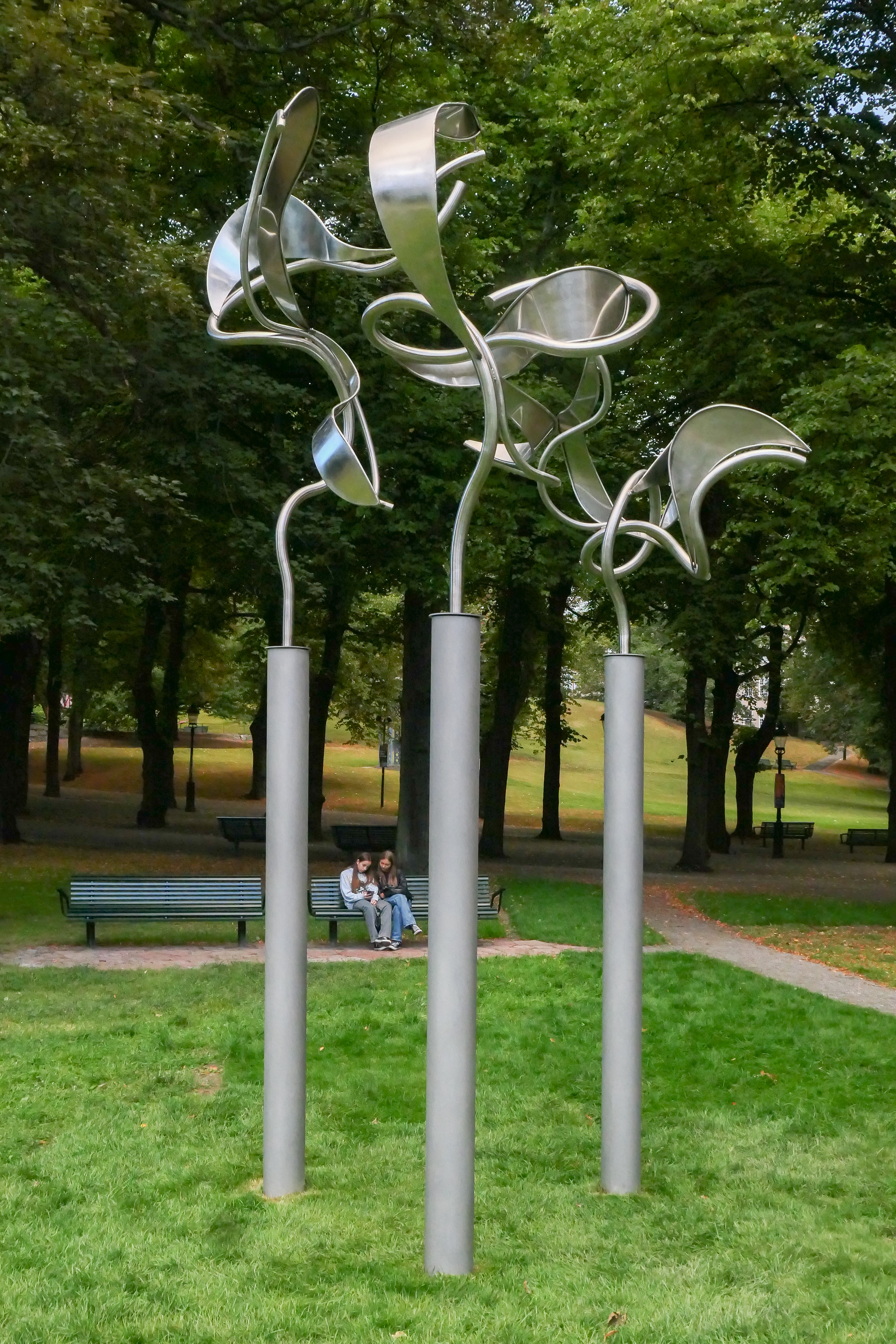
"Standing Waves", a statue in Humlegården, designed by Adèle Essle Zeiss and Liva Isakson in honour of Avicii

=== Music innovation ===
Many artists in the electronic dance music (EDM) genre have cited Avicii as an influence on their work, and many of these paid tribute to him after his death. Alan Walker and DubVision described him as an "icon" in EDM. Norwegian DJ Kygo cited Avicii as "[his] biggest inspiration and the reason why [he] started making electronic music". Other artists, such as Diplo, Sebastian Ingrosso, Felix Jaehn, and Martin Garrix, the last of whom collaborated with Avicii on his 2015 single "Waiting for Love", have also cited him as a source of inspiration. The songs "Levels" and "Seek Bromance" were named as points of inspiration.

On the day of Avicii's death, The Washington Post wrote an article calling him a pioneer artist who attempted to bridge the gap between country and electronic music, crediting his 2013 hits "Wake Me Up" and "Hey Brother" as examples of this movement. Avicii is also credited for influencing other attempts at continuing this genre crossover, including songs such as Zedd's "The Middle" and Hailee Steinfeld's "Let Me Go".

Writing the day after Avicii's death, Marcus Dowling of Mixmag described him as the artist "most responsible for the mainstream pop crossover success of electronic music", said his 2011 single "Levels" had "elevated electro into the pop cultural stratosphere" and that Avicii had become "a living legend". Several publications credit Avicii as one of the DJs who took electronic music to Top 40 radio in the early 2010s. He is also considered one of the most popular and most successful EDM artists of all time.

Avicii influenced several mainstream artists outside electronic music. Nile Rodgers said, in terms of melody writing, Avicii was "maybe one of the best, if not the best I've ever worked with". Mike Einziger of Incubus said, "Some of the work we did together is some of the music I'm most proud of in my whole life". Dan Reynolds of Imagine Dragons said, "working with [Avicii] was one of my favorite collaborative moments". Charlie Puth said Avicii was "The man who really opened my eyes as to what my productions could one day sound like". Eric Clapton said he was "inspired by Avicii" and dedicated a song off his Christmas album, Happy Xmas, to him.

In November 2019, Billboard named Avicii's 2011 hit "Levels" one of the 100 songs that define the 2010s, while his 2013 single "Wake Me Up" came 13th and was the highest-charting EDM song on the Official Charts Company's chart of the decade.

=== Tim Bergling Foundation ===
In March 2019, Bergling's family launched the Tim Bergling Foundation, focusing on mental illness and suicide prevention. The foundation works internationally and aims to educate people and businesses about suicide and mental health. The foundation also works to mitigate climate change, manage business development, and conserve endangered species. Since 2019, several music industry figures have cited Avicii's death as a reason for the increased awareness of mental health in the industry.

=== Avicii Experience Museum ===
Inspired by ABBA The Museum, the Avicii Experience opened in February 2022 with a ceremony by Prince Carl Phillip and Princess Sofia, alongside Bergling's father, Klas, in Space Stockholm, a digital-culture centre near Sergels torg. The museum features reconstructions of Bergling's childhood bedroom and Los Angeles mansion and offers the ability to remix recordings of Avicii's most popular works and unreleased music. The museum was the idea of Bergling's parents, who wanted to give fans a place to remember and celebrate the work of Avicii and learn about his music-creation process. The interactive museum also includes exhibitions depicting several stages in Avicii's life, including a simulation of the high-paced lifestyle he experienced before his retirement from touring in 2016. These exhibits are designed to give visitors an understanding of the health issues Avicii faced. Exhibitions are also dedicated to raising awareness of mental health problems in young people and the wider music industry.

== Filmography ==
Year	Title	Role	Notes
2017	Avicii: True Stories	Himself	Documentary
2024	Avicii – I'm Tim	Himself	Documentary

== Discography ==
Studio albums

- True (2013)
- Stories (2015)
- Tim (2019)

== Concert tours ==
- House for Hunger (2012)
- True Tour (2014)
- Stories World Tour (2015)

== In popular culture ==
- Avicii was depicted on a Swedish postage stamp issued 15 January 2015 by PostNord Sverige.
- Avicii was named in the 2015 song "I Took a Pill in Ibiza" by Mike Posner. Posner recounts the event when he went to an Avicii show in Ibiza and got a mystery pill from someone, with the starting lyrics "I took a pill in Ibiza / To show Avicii I was cool". The song was made in the week they wrote a song together in Sweden called "Stay with You".
- Avicii was the codename of the OnePlus Nord, a smartphone released in 2020.
- On 8 September 2021, Google released a doodle to pay homage to Bergling on what would have been his 32nd birthday during National Suicide Prevention Week.

== See also ==
- Popular music in Sweden
- Tim Bergling Foundation
