= Happened on a Saturday Night =

2020 song by Tebey

Single by Tebey

from the album The Good Ones
- Released: June 12, 2020
- Genre: Country
- Length: 2:53
- Label: Jayward; Sony Canada
- Songwriter(s): Tebey Ottoh; Danick Dupelle; Jimmy Thow
- Producer(s): Danick Dupelle

Tebey singles chronology
| "The Good Ones" (2019) | "Happened on a Saturday Night" (2020) | "Shotgun Rider" (2021) |

Music video
- "Happened on a Saturday Night" on YouTube

"Happened on a Saturday Night" is a song co-written and recorded by Canadian country artist Tebey. The song was co-written with Danick Dupelle and Jimmy Thow. It was the third single from Tebey's third studio album The Good Ones.

== Background ==
Tebey said the song is about "life changing, epic moments in life" and "connections, friendships, new love and great memories that can present themselves when you least expect them". The song was only written as a result of the COVID-19 pandemic. Tebey and Danick Dupelle could not get together to finish his album The Good Ones in early 2020 as planned due to pandemic restrictions, which led to more time for additional songwriting, subsequently resulting in "Happened on a Saturday Night" being written.

== Critical reception ==
Chris Country said the song is "ultra-catchy", describing it as "the perfect tune to have us all reminiscing about our most memorable summer nights". Courtney Fielder of Country100 called the song the "perfect song to cruise on into a weekend with".

== Commercial performance ==
"Happened on a Saturday Night" reached a peak of number 8 on the Billboard Canada Country chart dated November 21, 2020, marking Tebey's seventh Top 10 hit. It also peaked at number 98 on the Billboard Canadian Hot 100, his first charting entry there since his cover of "Wake Me Up" in 2014. It has been certified Gold by Music Canada.

== Music video ==
The official music video for "Happened on a Saturday Night" was directed by Ryan Nolan and premiered on July 18, 2020.

== Charts ==
| Chart (2020) | Peak position |
|---|---|
| Canada (Canadian Hot 100) | 98 |
| Canada Country (Billboard) | 8 |

== Certifications ==
| Region | Certification | Certified units/sales |
|---|---|---|
| Canada (Music Canada) | Gold | 40,000^{‡} |
^{‡} Sales+streaming figures based on certification alone.
