= The Good Ones =

The Good Ones may refer to:

- The Good Ones (album), a 2021 album by Tebey, or its title track
- "The Good Ones" (Brooklyn Nine-Nine), the opening episode of the eighth season of the American TV series
- "The Good Ones" (Gabby Barrett song), 2020
- "The Good Ones" (Tebey and Marie-Mai song), 2019

== See also ==
- "Good Ones" song by Charli XCX, 2021
- Good One, comedy album by Tig Notaro, 2011
