= Who's Gonna Love You =

2018 song by Tebey

Single by Tebey

from the EP Love a Girl
- Released: April 2018
- Genre: Country
- Length: 3:06
- Label: Road Angel; Warner Canada; Jayward
- Songwriters: Tebey Ottoh; Ryan Lafferty
- Producers: Danick Dupelle; Tebey

Tebey singles chronology
"Denim on Denim" (2018)	"Who's Gonna Love You" (2018)	"Good Jeans" (2019)

Music video
- "Who's Gonna Love You" on YouTube

"Who's Gonna Love You" is a song co-written and recorded by Canadian country artist Tebey. The song was co-written with Ryan Lafferty. It was the second single from Tebey's second extended play Love a Girl, and his first #1 hit on the Billboard Canada Country chart.

== Background ==
Tebey described the song as "an ode to all the amazing, patient women who put up with men". The chorus lyrics, "Who’s gonna love you if I don't?" depict the man responding to the woman, who jokingly asks him that question in a playful manner.

== Critical reception ==
Front Porch Music said the song has "a sultry sound and is really great to listen to". Complete Country said the song gives off "summer love vibes".

== Commercial performance ==
"Who's Gonna Love You" reached a peak of #1 on the Billboard Canada Country chart for the week of November 24, 2018, marking his first Number One hit. It was certified Gold by Music Canada.

== Music video ==
The official music video for "Who's Gonna Love You" was directed by Emma Higgins and premiered on July 28, 2018.

== Charts ==
Chart (2018)	Peak position
Canada Country (Billboard)	1

== Certifications ==
Region	Certification	Certified units/sales
Canada (Music Canada)	Gold	40,000^{‡}
^{‡} Sales+streaming figures based on certification alone.
