= What Was I Drinking =

2022 song by Tebey

Single by Tebey
- Released: January 14, 2022
- Genre: Country
- Length: 2:57
- Label: Jayward; Sony Canada
- Songwriter(s): Tebey Ottoh; Danick Dupelle; Jimmy Thow
- Producer(s): Tebey; Danick Dupelle

Tebey singles chronology
"Song of the Summer" (2021)	"What Was I Drinking" (2022)	"Sink With the Sun" (2022)

Lyric Video
- "What Was I Drinking" on YouTube

"What Was I Drinking" is a song co-written and recorded by Canadian country artist Tebey. He co-wrote the track with Danick Dupelle and Jimmy Thow, and co-produced it with Dupelle. It was intended to be the lead single off Tebey's album Tulum, but the album release did not occur.

== Background ==
Tebey wrote the song with his frequent collaborators Jimmy Thow and Danick Dupelle while in Mexico, with the title "What Was I Drinking" being partly inspired by a night out the three had during the trip. The three went out for several drinks one night and subsequently all woke up feeling "violently ill", with Thow remarking to Tebey "what were we drinking". Tebey stated that the track sounded more like country music than his recent contemporary-influenced singles. The track was released ahead of his appearance at the 2022 C2C: Country to Country festival in the United Kingdom.

== Critical reception ==
Top Country named the song their "Pick of the Week" for February 18, 2022, citing it as the "perfect song to get you in the mood" for the Family Day long weekend.

== Accolades ==
Year	Association	Category	Result	Ref
2022	Canadian Country Music Awards	Record Producer of the Year - Danick Dupelle, Tebey Ottoh	Nominated	
2023	Country Music Association of Ontario	Single of the Year	Nominated	

== Commercial performance ==
"What Was I Drinking" reached a peak of number 14 on the Billboard Canada Country chart. It debuted as the most added song at all formats of Canadian radio according to Mediabase, ahead of Ed Sheeran's The Joker and the Queen.

== Music video ==
The official lyric video for "What Was I Drinking" was directed by Brent Hallman and premiered on April 7, 2020. It features an animated stick figure of Tebey acting out the story of the song. Tebey also released an acoustic performance video on April 28, 2022. It was recorded in Nashville and features him on vocals alongside Danick Dupelle, Mike Melancon, and Stephan LaPlante as a supporting band.

== Charts ==
Chart (2022)	Peak position
Canada Country (Billboard)	14
