= Denim on Denim =

Denim on Denim may refer to:

- Denim on Denim (song), a 2018 by Tebey
- Denim on Denim (album), a 2010 album by Library Voices
