= The Man (Aloe Blacc song) =

2014 single by Aloe Blacc

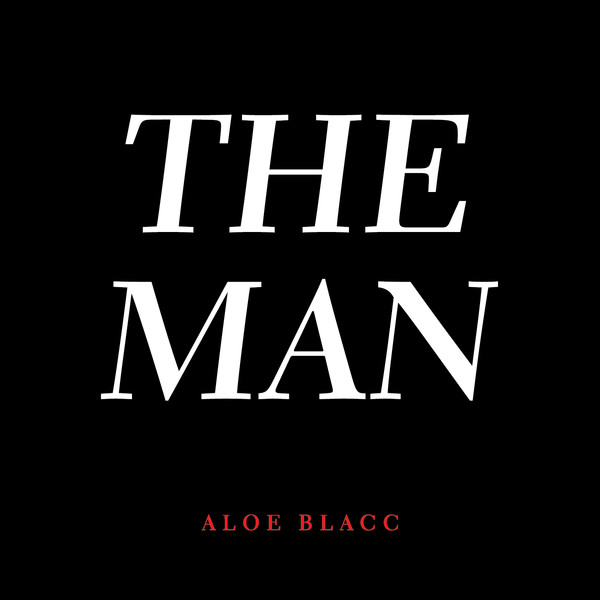

Single by Aloe Blacc

from the album Lift Your Spirit
- Released: January 21, 2014
- Recorded: 2013
- Genre: Soul; R&B
- Length: 4:16 (album version); 3:29 (radio edit)
- Label: Interscope
- Songwriters: Egbert Dawkins III; Sam Barsh; Daniel Seeff; Khalil Abdul Rahman; Elton John; Bernie Taupin
- Producers: DJ Khalil; Dontae Winslow; Alex Finkin

Aloe Blacc singles chronology
"Wake Me Up" (2013)	"The Man" (2014)	"Here Today" (2014)

"The Man" is a song by American singer Aloe Blacc. First included on his EP Wake Me Up, the song was later released as the second single from his third studio album, 2013's Lift Your Spirit, on Interscope Records. Blacc co-wrote the track with Sam Barsh, Daniel Seeff, and its producer DJ Khalil and Alex Finkin. Additionally, Elton John and Bernie Taupin are credited as songwriters as the song interpolates the melody and the lyric "you can tell everybody" from John's 1970 song "Your Song".

"The Man" is Blacc's most successful single as a solo artist to date; it sold 2.5 million copies in the United States as of December 2014, peaking at number eight on the Billboard Hot 100. Outside of the United States, "The Man" topped the charts in the United Kingdom, and peaked within the top ten of the charts in Australia, Ireland, New Zealand, and Sweden. On January 22, 2014, a remix of "The Man" featuring American rapper Kid Ink was released.

== Music video ==
A lyric video to accompany the release of "The Man" was first released to YouTube on January 10, 2014.

The song's official music video followed on March 3, 2014.

== Commercials ==
In December 2013, "The Man" was used as the soundtrack for a series of Beats by Dre commercials promoting the company's "Hear What You Want" campaign, which featured several notable sports personalities, including NFL players Richard Sherman of the Seattle Seahawks and Colin Kaepernick of the San Francisco 49ers, NBA player Kevin Garnett of the Brooklyn Nets, and Chelsea FC football player Cesc Fabregas, wearing Beats headphones to block out the sound of heckling from disgruntled fans.

The song was used extensively at the 2014 NFL draft, being played 108 times over the course of the three-day event. MLB also used the song for its ads for the 2014 MLB All-Star Game. The ad shows different highlights and celebrations of possible All-Stars for 2014.

== Charts ==
=== Weekly charts ===
Chart (2014)	Peak position
Australia (ARIA)	10
Austria (Ö3 Austria Top 40)	19
Belgium (Ultratop 50 Flanders)	29
Belgium Urban (Ultratop Flanders)	4
Belgium (Ultratop 50 Wallonia)	46
Canada Hot 100 (Billboard)	14
Czech Republic Airplay (ČNS IFPI)	35
Czech Republic Singles Digital (ČNS IFPI)	16
Denmark (Tracklisten)	11
Euro Digital Song Sales (Billboard)	1
France (SNEP)	23
Germany (GfK)	22
Hungary (Rádiós Top 40)	33
Hungary (Single Top 40)	28
Ireland (IRMA)	4
Italy (FIMI)	75
Netherlands (Dutch Top 40)	10
Netherlands (Single Top 100)	16
New Zealand (Recorded Music NZ)	5
Norway (VG-lista)	11
Poland (Polish Airplay Top 100)	10
Scotland Singles (OCC)	1
Slovakia Airplay (ČNS IFPI)	21
Slovakia Singles Digital (ČNS IFPI)	59
Slovenia (SloTop50)	32
South Africa (EMA)	8
Spain (PROMUSICAE)	46
Sweden (Sverigetopplistan)	6
Switzerland (Schweizer Hitparade)	40
UK Singles (OCC)	1
UK Hip Hop/R&B (OCC)	1
US Billboard Hot 100	8
US Hot R&B/Hip-Hop Songs (Billboard)	4
US Adult Alternative Airplay (Billboard)	20
US Adult R&B Songs (Billboard)	18
US Adult Pop Airplay (Billboard)	17
US Pop Airplay (Billboard)	7
US Rhythmic Airplay (Billboard)	10

=== Year-end charts ===
Chart (2014)	Position
Australia (ARIA)	65
Belgium Urban (Ultratop Flanders)	23
Canada (Canadian Hot 100)	78
France (SNEP)	96
Netherlands (Dutch Top 40)	46
Netherlands (Single Top 100)	81
New Zealand (Recorded Music NZ)	39
Sweden (Sverigetopplistan)	37
UK Singles (Official Charts Company)	53
US Billboard Hot 100	48
US Hot R&B/Hip-Hop Songs (Billboard)	13
US Mainstream Top 40 (Billboard)	47

== Certifications ==
Region	Certification	Certified units/sales
Australia (ARIA)	Platinum	70,000^{^}
Germany (BVMI)	Gold	150,000^{‡}
Italy (FIMI)	Gold	15,000^{‡}
New Zealand (RMNZ)	Platinum	15,000^{*}
Sweden (GLF)	2× Platinum	80,000^{‡}
United Kingdom (BPI)	Platinum	600,000^{‡}
United States (RIAA)	Platinum	2,500,000
Streaming
Denmark (IFPI Danmark)	2× Platinum	5,200,000^{†}
^{*} Sales figures based on certification alone.^{^} Shipments figures based on certification alone.^{‡} Sales+streaming figures based on certification alone.^{†} Streaming-only figures based on certification alone.

== Release history ==
Region	Date	Format	Label
United States	January 21, 2014	Contemporary hit radio	Interscope Records
United States	January 21, 2014	Rhythmic contemporary radio	Interscope Records
United States	February 4, 2014	Urban adult contemporary radio	Interscope Records
United Kingdom	March 28, 2014	Digital download	Interscope Records
United States	June 10, 2014	Digital download (Draft Day mix)	Interscope Records
