= The Good Ones (album) =

Studio album by Tebey
- Released: January 22, 2021
- Genre: Country pop
- Length: 24:10
- Label: Jayward Artist Group; The Orchard; Sony Music Canada
- Producer: Tebey; Danick Dupelle

Tebey chronology
Love a Girl (2018)	The Good Ones (2021)

Singles from The Good Ones
- 1. "Good Jeans" Released: May 10, 2019; 2. "The Good Ones" Released: October 9, 2019; 3. "Happened on a Saturday Night" Released: June 12, 2020; 4. "Shotgun Rider" Released: January 12, 2021; 5. "Song of the Summer" Released: June 14, 2021

The Good Ones is the third studio album by Canadian-American country music artist Tebey. It was released on January 22, 2021, through his label Jayward Artist Group, and distributed by Sony Music Canada, and The Orchard in the US. It includes the Top 10 Canada Country singles "Good Jeans", "The Good Ones" (with Marie-Mai), and "Happened on a Saturday Night", as well as the singles "Shotgun Rider" and "Song of the Summer".

== Background ==
Tebey and producer Danick Dupelle had initially intended to finish recording the album in early 2020 before the COVID-19 pandemic hit. He remarked that they "couldn’t get together for several months to complete it, and it’s actually good that we didn’t", because he would never have written the single "Happened on a Saturday Night" otherwise.

== Track listing ==
Adapted from Spotify.
No.	Title	Writer(s)	Length
1.	"Shotgun Rider"	Tebey Ottoh; Danick Dupelle; Jimmy Thow	3:07
2.	"Happened on a Saturday Night"	Tebey; Dupelle; Thow	2:53
3.	"The Good Ones" (with Marie-Mai)	Tebey; Kylie Sackley; Matt Rogers	3:43
4.	"Song of the Summer"	Tebey; Dupelle; Thow	3:06
5.	"Bad for Me"	Tebey; Dupelle; Emma-Lee Doty	2:45
6.	"Good Jeans"	Tebey; Dupelle; Thow	2:42
7.	"See You Around"	Tebey; Dupelle; Thow	2:41
8.	"Doing It Again"	Tebey; Colin Munroe; Kelly Archer	3:09
Total length:			24:10

== Charts ==
=== Singles ===
Year	Single	Peak chart positions		Certifications
Year	Single	CAN Country	CAN	Certifications
2019	"Good Jeans"	2	—	
2019	"The Good Ones" (with Marie-Mai)	8	— (Note: "The Good Ones" did not enter the Canadian Hot 100, but has peaked at number 14 on the Canadian Digital Song Sales component chart.)	MC: Gold
2020	"Happened on a Saturday Night"	8	98	MC: Gold
2021	"Shotgun Rider"	12	—	
2021	"Song of the Summer"	—	—	

== Awards and nominations ==
Year	Association	Category	Nominated work	Result	Ref.
2022	Country Music Association of Ontario	Music Video of the Year	"Song of the Summer" (Tebey and Una Healy)	Nominated	
2022	Country Music Association of Ontario	Record Producer of the Year	The Good Ones (Tebey and Danick Dupelle)	Nominated	
2022	Country Music Association of Ontario	Single of the Year	"Shotgun Rider"	Won	
