= We Write the Story =

Single by Avicii, B&B and Choir

from the album Eurovision Song Contest: Malmö 2013
- Released: 18 May 2013
- Recorded: April 2013
- Genre: EDM; pop rock
- Length: 6:33
- Label: Geffen
- Songwriters: Benny Andersson; Tim Bergling; Ash Pournouri; Björn Ulvaeus

Avicii singles chronology
| "X You" (2013) | "We Write the Story" (2013) | "Wake Me Up" (2013) |

Audio
- "We Write the Story" on YouTube

"We Write the Story" is a song composed by Swedish musicians Björn Ulvaeus, Benny Andersson and Avicii, as the anthem for the Eurovision Song Contest 2013 in Malmö. The track, released on 18 May 2013 (the day of the contest's final), is credited to Avicii, B&B & Choir on iTunes and Spotify. The song peaked at number 73 on the Dutch singles chart.

== Release and background ==
It was announced by the European Broadcasting Union (EBU) and host broadcaster SVT on 15 April 2013 that Björn Ulvaeus, Benny Andersson and Avicii would compose an anthem for the Eurovision Song Contest 2013 in Malmö. The idea of a "Eurovision Anthem" had existed since the start of the planning for the 2013 contest. Ulvaeus, Andersson and Avicii were on the very top of the list of musicians that SVT wished to collaborate with.

Andersson and Ulvaeus, who made up half of ABBA—alongside Agnetha Fältskog and Frida Lyngstad—said they agreed with SVT's "vision for the contest". The collaboration was hailed as a "union of two of Sweden's biggest musical exports". The song was performed for the first time by an on-stage choir at the start of the final on 18 May 2013.

The song is written in the key of E major.

== Track listing ==
Digital download

1. "We Write the Story" – 6:33
2. "We Write the Story" (Edited Version) – 4:04

== Credits and personnel ==
- Benny Andersson – composition, vocals
- Avicii – composition
- Choir – vocals
- Ash Pournouri – composition
- Björn Ulvaeus – composition, vocals

== Charts ==
| Chart (2013) | Peak position |
|---|---|
| Netherlands (Single Top 100) | 73 |

It is also worth noting that it debuted at 199 midweek according to the Official Charts Company on the UK Singles Chart, but did not enter the top 200 on the official week ending chart.
