= X You =

Single by Avicii
- Released: 26 February 2013
- Recorded: December 2012 – February 2013
- Genre: Progressive house
- Length: 6:51 (original mix); 3:20 (radio edit)
- Label: LE7ELS, UMG
- Songwriter: Tim Bergling
- Producers: Avicii; Kian Sang; Naxsy; Martin Kupilas; Ваня Хакси; Jonathan Madray; Mateusz Kolata; TheW; Christian Westphalen

Avicii singles chronology
"I Could Be the One" (2012)	"X You" (2013)	"We Write the Story" (2013)

Music video
- "Avicii - X You" on YouTube

"X You" is a progressive house song produced by Swedish house producer and DJ Avicii. The track was released as a digital download in Sweden on 26 February 2013. It is the final production for Avicii's successful project "Avicii X You". The song features sequences from Kian Sang (melody), Naxsy (bassline), Martin Kupilas (beat and rhythm), Ваня Хакси (break), Jonathan Madray, Mateusz Kolata, TheW and Christian Westphalen (effects). The song is written in the key of G minor, at a tempo of 126 BPM.

== Music video ==
The video for "X You" was released on Avicii's VEVO YouTube channel on 26 February 2013. The music video contains various clips of Avicii at work on the song and other short clips of nature for 5–10 seconds. It also contains text explaining the project, how many people contributed, the winners and the contributing countries. The video concludes with a time of 3 minutes and 46 seconds.

As of May 2025, the video has received over 17 million views.

== Track listing ==
Digital download
No.	Title	Length
1.	"X You" (Radio Edit)	3:20
2.	"X You" (Original Mix)	6:51

== Charts ==
=== Weekly charts ===
Chart (2013)	Peak position
Belgium (Ultratip Bubbling Under Flanders)	34
Netherlands (Single Top 100)	83
Sweden (Sverigetopplistan)	19
UK Singles (Official Charts)	47
UK Dance (Official Charts)	9
US Hot Dance/Electronic Songs (Billboard)	37

=== Year-end charts ===
Chart (2013)	Position
Sweden (Sverigetopplistan)	83

== Certifications ==
Region	Certification	Certified units/sales
Sweden (GLF)	Platinum	40,000^{‡}
^{‡} Sales+streaming figures based on certification alone.

== Release history ==
Region	Date	Format	Label
Sweden	22 February 2013	Digital download	LE7ELS
United Kingdom	22 February 2013	Digital download	LE7ELS
Russia	22 February 2013	Digital download	LE7ELS
