= The Wait (Tebey album) =

Studio album by Tebey
- Released: December 4, 2012
- Genre: Country
- Length: 37:36
- Label: Road Angel
- Producer: Tebey; Jason Barry

Tebey chronology
The Wait (2012)	Two (2014)

Singles from The Wait
- 1. "All About Us" Released: September 24, 2011; 2. "I'm in the Mood" Released: March 12, 2012; 3. "Somewhere in the Country" Released: October 22, 2012

The Wait is the debut album by Canadian country music artist Tebey. It was released on December 4, 2012 via Road Angel Entertainment. Tebey produced the album with Jason Barry. They were nominated for Record Producer(s) of the Year at the 2013 Canadian Country Music Association Awards for their work on the album. The single "Somewhere in the Country" peaked at number 80 on the Billboard Canadian Hot 100.

== Critical reception ==
Noah Siegel of New Canadian Music wrote that the tracks are "earnest and as tightly crafted as any modern country gets."

== Track listing ==
No.	Title	Length
1.	"All About Us"	3:56
2.	"I'm in the Mood"	3:42
3.	"Somewhere in the Country"	3:49
4.	"Resurrected Heart"	4:53
5.	"Love's Got a Hold on You"	3:22
6.	"Strangers" (featuring Tara Oram)	3:42
7.	"If I Didn't Know Better"	3:35
8.	"If I Lost You"	3:33
9.	"Good Time Comin' On"	3:41
10.	"Freedom"	3:23
Total length:		37:36

== Chart performance ==
=== Singles ===
Year	Single	Peak chart positions	
Year	Single	CAN Country	CAN
2011	"All About Us"	38	—
2012	"I'm in the Mood"	43	—
2012	"Somewhere in the Country"	11	80
"—" denotes releases that did not chart
