= Tebey =

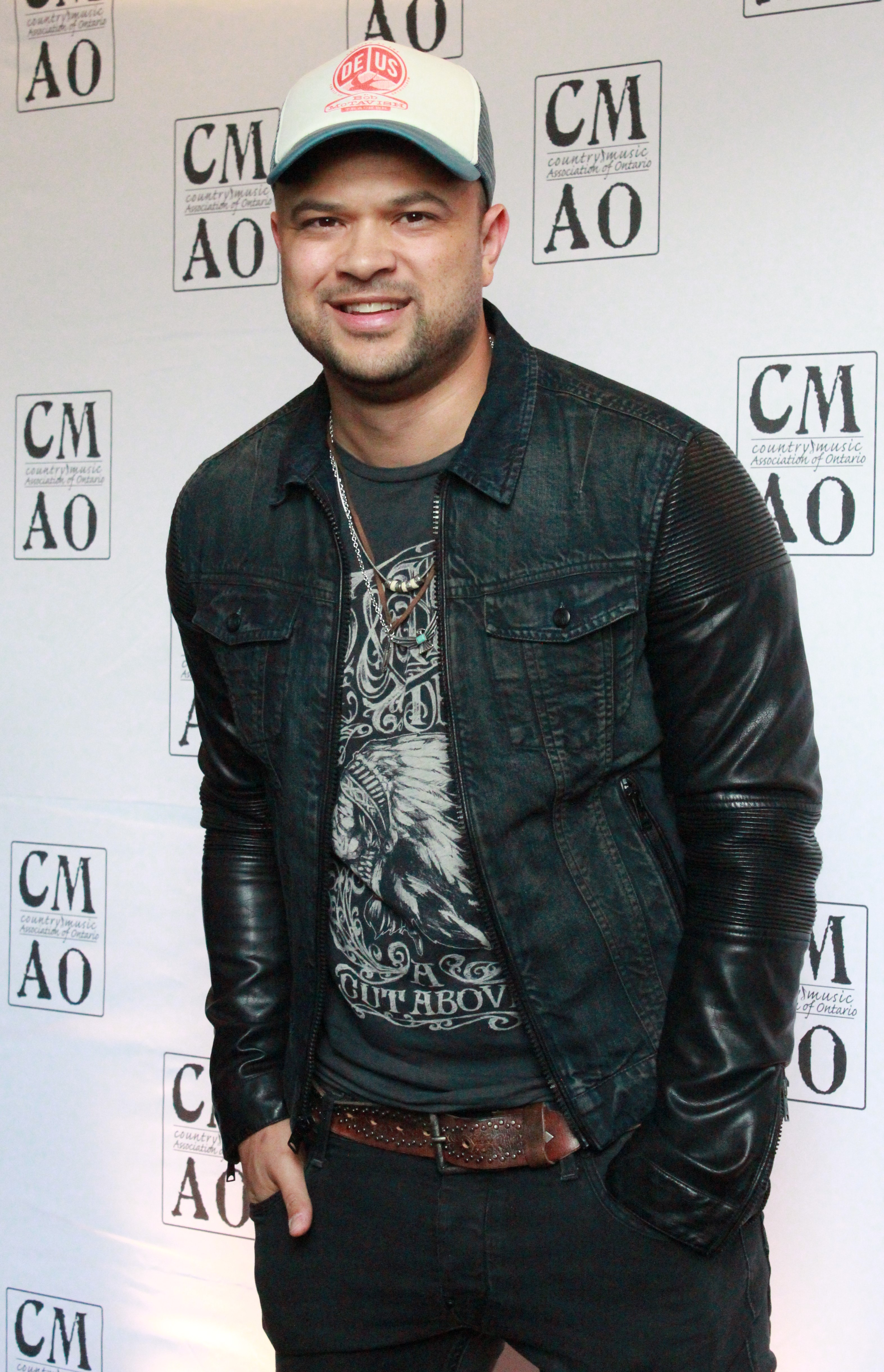

Background information
- Born: Tebey Solomon Ottoh; October 14, 1983 (age 43); Peterborough, Ontario, Canada
- Origin: Burlington, Ontario, Canada
- Genres: Country, pop
- Occupation: Singer-songwriter
- Years active: 2002–present
- Labels: BNA; RAE; Warner Music Canada; Jayward Artist Group Inc.
- Website: tebeyofficial.com

Tebey Solomon Ottoh (born October 14, 1983), known mononymously as Tebey, is a Canadian-American country music singer and multi-genre songwriter. His debut single, "We Shook Hands (Man to Man)", hit No. 47 on the Billboard Hot Country Songs charts and remains his only American chart hit. He has composed several singles for other artists, in addition to releasing music of his own. Tebey has landed seven songs in the top ten of the Canada Country airplay chart, including the number one hit "Who's Gonna Love You" in 2018.

== Early life ==
He started singing in church at the age of five and then began to sing at local events. In 1990 and again in 1994, he won the 14-and-under male division of the Canadian Open Country Singing Contest, and in 1996 and 1998, the 18-and-under male division. At 15, he signed a development deal with a major Nashville record label and moved to that city with his father, a Nigerian-born electronics engineer, with his mother and siblings staying back at their family home in Burlington, Ontario.

After three years, he and his father returned to Burlington. Ottoh was a high school football player at Assumption Catholic High School. But his Nashville career took a belated turn as Ottoh was signed to BNA Records as a singer and Warner Chappell Music as a staff songwriter in 2000. Soon after, he signed fellow Canadian Bruce Allen as his manager.

== Career ==
In 2002 and 2003, his performance of "We Shook Hands (Man to Man)" became a charted country radio hit in the United States and Canada. Tebey was the subject of a segment on CBC Radio's Sounds Like Canada, and nominated for a 2004 Canadian Radio Music Award for Best New Group or Solo Artist (Country), against Damian Marshall, Deric Ruttan, Heather Dawn and Jason Blaine.

Returning to Canada, Tebey became a professional songwriter in popular music outside of country. Artists for whom he has written include Sony BMG recording artist Rex Goudie (including co-writing the No. 1 Hot AC single "Run"), Shawn Desman (including co-writing his No. 1 pop/r&b single "Let's Go"), 2006 Canadian Idol winner Melissa O'Neil, Open Road/Universal country Tara Oram and On Ramp/EMI artist Brad Johner. Tebey also has a co-penned song on Big & Rich's million selling album Between Raising Hell and Amazing Grace platinum.

As a country music artist, Tebey has had several hit singles in Canada. His songs "Somewhere In The Country" and "Till It's Gone" were Top 10 radio hits in 2012 and 2013 respectively. In 2014, Tebey's country cover of Avicii's "Wake Me Up" reached No. 5 on the Canadian country music radio airplay chart and has sold in excess of 40,000 copies, being certified Canadian Gold. In 2014 Tebey signed a record deal with Road Angel Entertainment, a sub label of the parent company, Warner Music Canada. In February 2018 Tebey released the first single "Denim on Denim" off his EP Love a Girl.

In 2019, Tebey launched his own record label, Jayward Artist Group, with management executive Jill Snell. He signed himself and Quebecois country artist Matt Lang to the new label. His third album The Good Ones was released on the new label in January 2021. It includes the singles "Good Jeans", "Happened on a Saturday Night", "Shotgun Rider", "Song of the Summer", and the title track "The Good Ones", a duet with pop artist Marie-Mai.

In 2022, Tebey released "What Was I Drinking", the lead single from an album initially slated for a late 2022 release titled Tulum. The album release did not materialize, but he continued to release more singles. In January 2024, he released the single "Hold Your Horses". He followed that up with a cover of The Weeknd's single "Blinding Lights". In November 2024, he released "Hangover at My Place", a duet with Tenille Arts.

== Songwriting ==
Currently signed to BMG Music Publishing in Los Angeles, Tebey has seen his songs recorded by various artists in both the country and pop music genres. Notable pop artists to have recorded his songs include One Direction, Flo Rida, Fifth Harmony, Cher and The Veronicas. On April 16, 2017, Tebey scored his first Billboard Country No. 1 as a songwriter when his song "Somebody Else Will" became Justin Moore's eighth No. 1 song. He scored his first Canada Country No. 1 as a songwriter with Gord Bamford's "Dive Bar" in 2018.

In 2007, Tebey signed a worldwide co-publishing deal with Ole Media Management. He subsequently then moved to Nashville, Tennessee where he currently resides. In 2008, Tebey has found himself traveling quite frequently to Stockholm Sweden, and Los Angeles to write for projects outside of the country music genre. His recent co-writers include production team The Runners, Francci Richard, Location Songs, Kristian Lundin, and Lonny Bereal.

In 2009, Tebey co-wrote the Teairra Mari single featuring Flo Rida called "Cause A Scene". The music video was shot in Las Vegas on April 7. The album was released by Fo'Reel Ent/Warner Bros that summer. On September 11, 2011, Tebey scored his first-ever UK No. 1 single as a songwriter when his song "All About Tonight", recorded by Pixie Lott (Mercury Records), debuted at No. 1 with over 88,000 copies sold. On September 18, the song also topped the official UK Radio Airplay Chart, surpassing Maroon 5's "Moves Like Jagger". The song was also nominated for Single of The Year at the 2012 Brit Awards.

In 2012, Tebey wrote and co-produced the One Direction songs "They Don't Know About Us" and "Loved You First" from their second album, "Take Me Home".

== Discography ==
=== Studio albums ===
Title	Details
The Wait	Release date: December 4, 2012; Label: Road Angel
Two	Release date: March 11, 2014; Label: Road Angel/Warner Music Canada
The Good Ones	Release date: January 22, 2021; Label: Jayward Artist Group/The Orchard/Sony Music Canada

=== Extended plays ===
Title	Details
Old School	Release date: July 8, 2016; Label: Road Angel/Warner Music Canada
Love a Girl	Release date: April 27, 2018; Label: Tebey Music

=== Singles ===
Year	Title	Peak chart positions			Certifications	Album
Year	Title	CAN	CAN Country	US Country	Certifications	Album
2003	"We Shook Hands (Man to Man)"	—	—	47		Non-album singles
2007	"Damned If I"	—	—	—		Non-album singles
2011	"All About Us"	—	38	—		The Wait
2012	"I'm in the Mood"	—	43	—		The Wait
2012	"Somewhere in the Country"	80	11	—		The Wait
2013	"Till It's Gone"	88	8	—		Two
2013	"Let It Down"	—	24	—		Two
2013	"Wake Me Up" (with Emerson Drive)	56	5	—	MC: Gold	Two
2014	"Now I Do"	—	19	—		Non-album single
2015	"When the Buzz Wears Off"	—	16	—		Old School
2015	"Jealous of the Sun"	—	19	—		Old School
2016	"Lightweight"	—	37	—		Old School
2016	"Old School"	—	—	—		Old School
2018	"Denim on Denim"	—	5	—	MC: Platinum	Love a Girl
2018	"Who's Gonna Love You"	—	1	—	MC: Gold	Love a Girl
2019	"Good Jeans"	—	2	—		The Good Ones
2019	"The Good Ones" (with Marie-Mai)	— (Note: "The Good Ones" did not enter the Canadian Hot 100, but has peaked at number 14 on the Canadian Digital Song Sales component chart.)	8	—	MC: Gold	The Good Ones
2020	"Happened on a Saturday Night"	98	8	—	MC: Gold	The Good Ones
2021	"Shotgun Rider"	—	12	—		The Good Ones
2021	"Song of the Summer" (solo or with Una Healy)	—	—	—		The Good Ones
2022	"What Was I Drinking"	—	14	—		Non-album singles
2022	"Sink with the Sun"	—	32	—		Non-album singles
2024	"Hold Your Horses"	—	28	—		Non-album singles
2024	"Blinding Lights (Country Version)"	—	20	—		Non-album singles
2025	"Hangover at My Place" (with Tenille Arts)	—	38	—		Non-album singles
2026	"That's Gonna Leave a Memory"	—	26	—		TBA
"—" denotes releases that did not chart or were not released to that territory

=== Christmas singles ===
Year	Title	Peak positions
Year	Title	CAN Country
2021	"Christmas (Baby, Please Come Home)"	49

=== Music videos ===
Year	Title	Director
2012	"Somewhere in the Country"	Stephano Barberis
2013	"Let It Down"	David Tenniswood
2014	"Now I Do"	Andrew MacCormack
2015	"When the Buzz Wears Off"	David Tenniswood
2015	"Jealous of the Sun"	David Pichette
2016	"Lightweight"	Jeff Johnson
2016	"Old School"	Stephen Knifton
2018	"Denim on Denim"	Emma Higgins
2019	"The Good Ones" (with Marie-Mai)	Raphael Mazzucco
2020	"Happened on a Saturday Night"	Ryan Nolan
2020	"Shotgun Rider"	Sean Cartwright

== Awards and nominations ==
Year	Association	Category	Result
2013	Canadian Country Music Association	Rising Star	Nominated
2014	Canadian Country Music Association	Rising Star	Nominated
2017	Country Music Association of Ontario	Male Artist of the Year	Nominated
2017	Country Music Association of Ontario	Fan's Choice	Nominated
2019	Canadian Country Music Association	Album of the Year – Love A Girl	Nominated
2019	Canadian Country Music Association	Record Producer of the Year (with Danick Dupelle) – "Who's Gonna Love You"	Nominated
2020	Canadian Country Music Association	Fans’ Choice Award	Nominated
2020	Canadian Country Music Association	Male Artist of the Year	Nominated
2021	Country Music Association of Ontario	Fans' Choice	Nominated
2022	Country Music Association of Ontario	Fans' Choice	Nominated
2022	Country Music Association of Ontario	Music Video of the Year – "Song of the Summer" (with Una Healy)	Nominated
2022	Country Music Association of Ontario	Record Producer of the Year (with Danick Dupelle)	Nominated
2022	Country Music Association of Ontario	Single of the Year – "Shotgun Rider"	Won
2022	Canadian Country Music Association	Record Producer of the Year (with Danick Dupelle) - "What Was I Drinking"	Nominated
2023	Country Music Association of Ontario	Fans' Choice	Nominated
2023	Country Music Association of Ontario	Male Artist of the Year	Nominated
2023	Country Music Association of Ontario	Music Video of the Year – "Sink with the Sun"	Nominated
2023	Country Music Association of Ontario	Record Producer of the Year (with Danick Dupelle)	Nominated
2023	Country Music Association of Ontario	Single of the Year – "What Was I Drinking"	Nominated
2024	Canadian Country Music Association	Innovative Campaign of the Year - "Blinding Lights" Case Study	Won
2025	Country Music Association of Ontario	Fans' Choice	Nominated
2025	Country Music Association of Ontario	Music Video of the Year - "Blinding Lights (Country Version)"	Nominated
2025	Country Music Association of Ontario	Single of the Year - "Blinding Lights (Country Version)"	Nominated
2025	Country Music Association of Ontario	Songwriter(s) of the Year - "Hangover at My Place" (with Griffen Palmer, Stuart Walker, Danick Dupelle)	Nominated
