= Two (Tebey album) =

Studio album by Tebey
- Released: March 11, 2014
- Genre: Country
- Label: Road Angel; Warner Canada
- Producer: Tebey; Danick Dupelle

Tebey chronology
The Wait (2012)	Two (2014)	Old School (2016)

Singles from Two
- 1. "Till It's Gone" Released: March 12, 2013; 2. "Let It Down" Released: October 14, 2013; 3. "Wake Me Up" Released: November 27, 2013

Two is the second studio album by Canadian country music artist Tebey. It was released on March 11, 2014, via Road Angel Entertainment and distributed by Warner Music Canada. The album includes a cover of Avicii's "Wake Me Up" featuring Emerson Drive. It reached the top 10 on the Billboard Canada Country chart.

== Critical reception ==
Mark Weber of the Lacombe Express wrote that "Tebey sounds terrific from song to song, like he’s pouring an unbridled expression and enthusiasm into every note."

== Track listing ==
No.	Title	Length
1.	"Wake Me Up" (featuring Emerson Drive)	4:35
2.	"Till It's Gone"	3:22
3.	"Let It Down"	3:09
4.	"I'd Be Lying"	4:25
5.	"Take Me Back"	3:36
6.	"Two"	2:59
7.	"Hot Mess"	2:53
8.	"Music Man"	3:28
9.	"Anything Less"	3:51
10.	"Tipsy"	4:02

== Charts ==
=== Singles ===
Year	Single	Peak chart positions	
Year	Single	CAN Country	CAN
2013	"Till It's Gone"	8	88
2013	"Let It Down"	24	—
2013	"Wake Me Up"	5	56
"—" denotes releases that did not chart
