= Old School (EP) =

EP by Tebey
- Released: July 8, 2016
- Genre: Country
- Length: 21:06
- Label: Road Angel; Warner Canada
- Producer: Tebey; Danick Dupelle; Sam Ellis

Tebey chronology
Two (2014)	Old School (2016)	Love a Girl (2018)

Singles from Old School
- 1. "When the Buzz Wears Off" Released: April 7, 2015; 2. "Jealous of the Sun" Released: October 2, 2015; 3. "Lightweight" Released: May 6, 2016; 4. "Old School" Released: September 2016

Old School is the debut extended play by Canadian country music singer, Tebey. It was released July 8, 2016 through Road Angel Entertainment and Warner Music Canada. The EP includes the top-20 Canada Country singles "When the Buzz Wears Off" and "Jealous of the Sun", as well as Tebey's top-5 cover of Avicii's "Wake Me Up", which was also included on his 2014 album, Two.

Tebey co-wrote all five of the original tracks on the extended play and co-produced every song with Danick Dupelle, except for "Lightweight". He toured in support of the record in July and August 2016.

== Singles ==
"When the Buzz Wears Off" serves as the record's first single and was released on April 7, 2015. It reached a peak position of 16 on the Canada Country airplay chart dated July 18, 2015.

The second single, "Jealous of the Sun", was released October 2, 2015. It peaked at 19 on the Canada Country chart.

"Lightweight" was released May 6, 2016 as the third single and official lead single for the EP. It entered the Canada Country chart at number 48 on the chart dated July 2, 2016 and eventually reached a peak position of 37 on the chart dated August 6, 2016.

=== Other songs ===
Tebey and Emerson Drive's cover of Avicii's "Wake Me Up" is also included on the extended play. It was previously recorded for Tebey's second studio album, Two (2014) and released as a single from that album in 2013. It charted at number 56 on the Canadian Hot 100 and at number 5 on Canada Country, making it his most successful single to date.

== Track listing ==
No.	Title	Writer(s)	Length
1.	"Old School"	Tebey Ottoh; Danick Dupelle; Kylie Sackley	2:50
2.	"When the Buzz Wears Off"	Ottoh; Kelly Archer	3:38
3.	"Jealous of the Sun"	Ottoh; Dupelle; Emily Weisband	3:14
4.	"Everybody Knows It But You"	Ottoh; Dupelle; Sackley	3:29
5.	"Lightweight"	Ottoh; Sam Ellis; Cole Taylor	3:20
6.	"Wake Me Up" (featuring Emerson Drive)	Tim Bergling; Aloe Blacc; Mike Einziger	4:35
Total length:			21:06

Notes

- All songs produced by Tebey and Danick Dupelle, except "Lightweight", produced by Sam Ellis.

== Charts ==
=== Singles ===
Year	Single	Peak chart positions
Year	Single	CAN Country
2015	"When the Buzz Wears Off"	16
2015	"Jealous of the Sun"	19
2016	"Lightweight"	37
2016	"Old School"	—
