= The Good Ones (Tebey and Marie-Mai song) =

2019 song by Tebey and Marie-Mai

Single by Tebey and Marie-Mai

from the album The Good Ones
- Released: September 28, 2019
- Genre: Country pop
- Length: 3:43
- Label: Jayward; Sony Canada; The Orchard
- Songwriter(s): Tebey Ottoh; Kylie Sackley; Matt Rogers
- Producer(s): Tebey; Danick Dupelle

Tebey singles chronology
"Good Jeans" (2019)	"The Good Ones" (2019)	"Happened on a Saturday Night" (2020)

Marie-Mai singles chronology
"Jamais Trop Tard" (2014)	"The Good Ones" (2019)	"Sans Lendemain" (2020)

Music video
- "The Good Ones" on YouTube

"The Good Ones" is a song recorded by Canadian country artist Tebey and Canadian pop singer Marie-Mai. The song was written by Tebey with Kylie Sackley and Matt Rogers. It was the second single off Tebey's third studio album, The Good Ones.

== Background ==
Tebey said while writing the song, he thought of "looking back at a lost love". The song was not originally intended to be a duet, but Tebey felt it was better served as a duet after recording the demo. He said Marie-Mai, a French-Canadian pop star, was his first choice and as they shared a mutual friend he was able to send her the song. Marie-Mai stated that she loves "trying different genres and breaking out of the boxes", and that she agreed to do the song immediately after hearing it.

== Critical reception ==
Sterling Whitaker of Taste of Country said the song blends "contemporary country and lush pop elements for a progressive sound". The song was named Top Country Pick of the Week for October 11, 2019.

== Commercial performance ==
"The Good Ones" reached a peak of number 8 on the Billboard Canada Country chart dated March 7, 2020, marking Tebey's sixth Top 10 hit. It also peaked at number 14 on the Hot Canadian Digital Song Sales chart, his second charting entry there after "Wake Me Up" in 2014. The song has been certified Gold by Music Canada.

== Music video ==
The official music video for "The Good Ones" was directed by Raphael Mazzucco and premiered on Taste of Country on September 28, 2019. The video was filmed on Mazzucco's property in Connecticut and features both singers.

== Charts ==
Chart (2020)	Peak position
Canada Country (Billboard)	8
Canada Digital Songs (Billboard)	14

== Certifications ==
Region	Certification	Certified units/sales
Canada (Music Canada)	Gold	40,000^{‡}
^{‡} Sales+streaming figures based on certification alone.

== Release history ==
Region	Date	Format	Label	Ref.
Various	28 September 2019	Digital download; streaming	Jayward; The Orchard	
Canada	9 October 2019	Country radio	Jayward; Sony Canada	
