= Lift Your Spirit =

Studio album by Aloe Blacc
- Released: October 25, 2013
- Recorded: 2011–2013
- Genres: Pop; R&B; soul
- Length: 42:29
- Label: Interscope
- Producers: DJ Khalil; Pharrell Williams; Theron Feemster; Rock Mafia

Aloe Blacc chronology
Wake Me Up (2013)	Lift Your Spirit (2013)	Christmas (2015)

Singles from Lift Your Spirit
- 1. "Wake Me Up" Released: September 30, 2013; 2. "The Man" Released: January 21, 2014; 3. "Here Today" Released: June 23, 2014

Lift Your Spirit is the third studio album by American musician Aloe Blacc. The album was released on October 25, 2013, through Interscope Records. It was released in the United States on March 11, 2014, and April 7, 2014, in the United Kingdom. The album has charted in Austria, Germany and Switzerland. It includes production and co-songwriting from DJ Khalil, Pharrell Williams, Elton John, Theron Feemster and Rock Mafia. Strings for the entire album were arranged and recorded by Daniel "Danny Keyz" Tannenbaum. The album received a nomination for the Grammy Award for Best R&B Album at the 57th Grammy Awards in 2015. The song "Ticking Bomb" was used as the official theme song of WWE PPV event Payback 2014.

== Background ==
In an interview with Billboard in the US, Blacc talked about his new album saying, "It's called 'Lift Your Spirit, and I've got production by Pharrell Williams, the Rock Mafia, DJ Khalil - and we're working on making a fantastic album that blends together a lot of different styles of music - sort of the same way we blended dance music and country on 'Wake Me Up!".

== Singles ==
"Wake Me Up" was released as the lead single from the album on September 30, 2013. The song has charted in Austria, Belgium, France, Germany, the Netherlands and Switzerland. In an interview with Billboard's Keith Caulfield at Sunday's American Music Awards, he revealed that even though the song doesn't officially include him as a featured artist like many electronic music songs, he isn't craving the extra attention, instead hoping it becomes a pleasant surprise for some people down the road, he said, "It's one of those things where it's bittersweet for the fans' sake; I want my fans to know that I'm doing something new" He is credited as a co-writer on the song, having come up with the lyrics on an airplane, he said, "I was thinking to myself, 'My life is a dream. Wake me up when it's over, when I walked into the session with Mike Einziger on guitar and Avicii, Mike was playing his guitar chords and these words... the way I sang them just felt right. We ended up recording it that night and I drove home listening to this acoustic version that Avicii eventually made into a fantastic hit. It's a wonderful experience."

"The Man" was released as the second single from the album on January 21, 2014, in the United States and March 30, 2014, in the United Kingdom. The song peaked at number 8 on the US Billboard Hot 100 and number 1 on the UK Singles Chart. "The Man" interpolates part of Elton John's "Your Song" in the chorus.

"Can You Do This" was released as a single in late 2014. The video features Kaley Cuoco and Kevin Hart.

Promotional singles

"Lift Your Spirit" was released as the free iTunes Single of the Week for the week of March 11, 2014 in the United States.

== Critical reception ==
Professional ratings
Aggregate scores
Source	Rating
Metacritic	64/100
Review scores
Source	Rating
AllMusic	3.5/5 stars
Digital Spy	1/5 stars
Exclaim!	7/10
The Guardian	2/5 stars
The Independent	4/5 stars
HipHopDX	3/5 stars
New York Daily News	4/5 stars
The Observer	3/5 stars
PopMatters	6/10
Rolling Stone	3/5 stars

Upon the album's North American release, at Metacritic, which assigns a normalized rating out of 100 to reviews from mainstream critics, the album received an average score of 64, which indicates "generally favorable reviews", based on 13 reviews.

== Commercial performance ==
On November 8, 2013, the album entered the Austrian Albums Chart at number 43. On November 10, 2013, the album entered the Swiss Albums Chart at number 22; it dropped to number 46 in its second week, number 71 in its third week, then dropped to number 90 in its fourth week. On December 15, 2013, the album re-entered the chart at number 86. The album peaked at number 16 on the German Albums Chart. On December 13, the album re-entered the Austrian Albums Chart at number 60. On March 31, 2014, the album entered the New Zealand Albums Chart at number 10, dropping to number 27 in its second week.

== Track listing ==
Standard edition
No.	Title	Writer(s)	Producer(s)	Length
1.	"Wake Me Up" (acoustic)	Tim Bergling; Egbert Nathaniel Dawkins III; Mike Einziger	DJ Khalil	3:45
2.	"The Man"	Dawkins III; Elton John; Bernie Taupin; Sam Barsh; Daniel Seeff; Khalil Abdul Rahman	DJ Khalil	4:15
3.	"Soldier In the City"	Dawkins III; Harold Lilly; D. Farmer; Ethan Farmer	DJ Khalil	3:25
4.	"Love Is the Answer"	Dawkins III; Pharrell Williams	Pharrell Williams	3:44
5.	"Here Today"	Dawkins III	DJ Khalil	3:54
6.	"Wanna Be with You"	Dawkins III; Theron Feemster	Theron Feemster	3:44
7.	"Lift Your Spirit"	Dawkins III	DJ Khalil	3:26
8.	"Red Velvet Seat"	Dawkins III; Lilly; E. Walls; Farmer	DJ Khalil	3:23
9.	"Can You Do This"	Dawkins III; Pranam Injeti; Daniel Tannenbaum; Rahman	DJ Khalil	2:56
10.	"Ticking Bomb"	Dawkins III; Antonina Armato; Tim James; Adam Schmalholz	Rock Mafia	3:36
11.	"Eyes of a Child"	Dawkins III; Lilly; Walls; Farmer	DJ Khalil	6:13

Deluxe edition
No.	Title	Writer(s)	Producer(s)	Length
12.	"Chasing"	Dawkins III; Farmer; Lilly	DJ Khalil	4:22
13.	"The Hand Is Quicker"	Dawkins III; Farmer; Lilly	DJ Khalil	5:02
14.	"Owe It All"	Dawkins III; Farmer; Lilly	DJ Khalil	3:53
15.	"Hello World (The World Is Ours)"	Dawkins III	Rock Mafia	3:13
16.	"The Man" (Draft Day mix)	Dawkins III; John; Taupin; Barsh; Seeff; Abdul Rahman	DJ Khalil	3:59

Limited edition bonus disc
No.	Title	Writer(s)	Producer(s)	Length
1.	"Chasing"	Dawkins III; Farmer; Lilly	DJ Khalil	4:22
2.	"The Hand Is Quicker"	Dawkins III; Farmer; Lilly	DJ Khalil	5:02
3.	"Owe It All"	Dawkins III; Farmer; Lilly	DJ Khalil	3:53

=== US version ===
Standard edition
No.	Title	Writer(s)	Producer(s)	Length
1.	"The Man"	Dawkns III; John; Taupin; Barsh; Seeff; Rahman	DJ Khalil	4:15
2.	"Love Is the Answer"	Dawkins III; Williams	Williams	3:44
3.	"Wake Me Up" (acoustic)	Bergling; Dawkins III; Einziger	DJ Khalil	3:45
4.	"Here Today"	Dawkins III	DJ Khalil	3:54
5.	"Can You Do This"	Dawkins III; Injeti; Tannenbaum; Rahman	DJ Khalil	2:56
6.	"Chasing"	Dawkins III; Farmer; Lilly	DJ Khalil	4:22
7.	"The Hand Is Quicker"	Dawkins III; Farmer; Lilly	DJ Khalil	5:02
8.	"Ticking Bomb"	Dawkins III; Armato; James; Adam Schmalholz	Rock Mafia	3:36
9.	"Red Velvet Seat"	Dawkins III; Lilly; E. Walls; Farmer	DJ Khalil	3:23
10.	"Owe It All"	Dawkins III; Farmer; Lilly	DJ Khalil	3:53

Target exclusive bonus tracks
No.	Title	Writer(s)	Producer(s)	Length
11.	"Lift Your Spirit"	Dawkins III	DJ Khalil	3:26
12.	"Eyes of a Child"	Dawkins III; Lilly; Walls; Farmer	DJ Khalil	6:13

== Charts ==
=== Weekly charts ===
Chart (2013–14)	Peak position
Australian Albums (ARIA)	19
Austrian Albums (Ö3 Austria)	43
Belgian Albums (Ultratop Flanders)	33
Belgian Albums (Ultratop Wallonia)	37
Dutch Albums (Album Top 100)	39
French Albums (SNEP)	12
German Albums (Offizielle Top 100)	16
Italian Albums (FIMI)	80
New Zealand Albums (RMNZ)	10
Portuguese Albums (AFP)	29
Scottish Albums (Official Charts)	8
Swedish Albums (Sverigetopplistan)	17
Swiss Albums (Schweizer Hitparade)	22
UK Albums (Official Charts)	5
UK R&B Albums (Official Charts)	1
US Billboard 200	4
US Top R&B/Hip-Hop Albums (Billboard)	2
US Top Rap Albums (Billboard)	1

=== Year-end charts ===
Chart (2014)	Position
French Albums (SNEP)	151
US Billboard 200	147
US Top R&B/Hip-Hop Albums (Billboard)	29
US Top R&B Albums (Billboard)	16

== Release history ==
Region	Date	Format	Label
Austria	October 25, 2013	Digital download, CD	Interscope Records
Germany	October 25, 2013	Digital download, CD	Interscope Records
Switzerland	October 25, 2013	Digital download, CD	Interscope Records
United States	March 11, 2014	Digital download, CD	Interscope Records
United Kingdom	April 7, 2014	Digital download, CD	Interscope Records
