= Denim on Denim (song) =

2018 song by Tebey

Single by Tebey

from the EP Love a Girl
- Released: February 9, 2018
- Genre: Country pop
- Length: 2:46
- Label: Road Angel; Warner Canada; Jayward
- Songwriter(s): Tebey Ottoh; Kelly Archer; Nathan Spicer
- Producer(s): Danick Dupelle

Tebey singles chronology
"Old School" (2016)	"Denim on Denim" (2018)	"Who's Gonna Love You" (2018)

Music video
- "Denim on Denim" on YouTube

"Denim on Denim" is a song recorded by Canadian country artist Tebey. He co-wrote the song with Kylie Sackley and Matt Rogers. It was the lead single off Tebey's second extended play Love a Girl, and his debut single to radio in the United Kingdom.

== Background ==
Tebey remarked that co-writer Nathan Spicer came up with the keyboard synthesizer sound for the opening of the track, and other co-writer Kelly Archer came up with the title "Denim on Denim". He initially did not want to write the song because he felt it was lacking a concept. After the three discussed it, they came up with the full idea and wrote the entire song. He said the song is "just one of those records that I didn’t know what the response was gonna be because it’s quite progressive". He said he was "very nervous" about releasing the song to country radio, and that it was "awesome" to see both the radio and fans embrace the song.

== Commercial performance ==
"Denim on Denim" reached a peak of number 5 on the Billboard Canada Country chart dated May 26, 2018, marking Tebey's second Top 10 hit. According to Nielsen BDS, "Denim on Denim" was the third most-played domestic song on Canadian country radio in 2018 after "Good Together" by James Barker Band and "Long Live the Night" by the Reklaws. It later became his first single to be certified Platinum by Music Canada.

== Music video ==
The official music video for "Denim on Denim" was directed by Emma Higgins and premiered on February 18, 2018.

== Charts ==
Chart (2018)	Peak position
Canada Country (Billboard)	5

== Certifications ==
Region	Certification	Certified units/sales
Canada (Music Canada)	Platinum	80,000^{‡}
^{‡} Sales+streaming figures based on certification alone.
