= Wake Me Up (EP) =

EP by Aloe Blacc
- Released: October 22, 2013
- Recorded: 2011–2013
- Length: 18:17
- Labels: Aloe Blacc Recording, Inc. XIX Recordings LLC; Interscope

Aloe Blacc chronology
Energy Live Session: Aloe Blacc & the Grand Scheme (2013)	Wake Me Up (2013)	Lift Your Spirit (2013)

Wake Me Up is an EP by American singer Aloe Blacc. After the big success of "Wake Me Up!" by Avicii, Blacc recorded a solo acoustic version of the song, and released it on this similarly-titled EP (without the exclamation mark). It was released on October 22, 2013 on Aloe Blacc Recording, Inc. under exclusive license to XIX Recordings LLC/Interscope Records. The EP release was successful in its own right charting on a number of singles charts, notably Belgium, France, the Netherlands and Switzerland.

== Track listing ==
All five tracks including "Wake Me Up" were solo interpretations by Aloe Blacc.

No.	Title	Length
1.	"The Man"	4:15
2.	"Wake Me Up" (acoustic)	3:45
3.	"Love Is the Answer"	3:44
4.	"Can You Do This"	2:56
5.	"Ticking Bomb"	3:37
Total length:		18:17

== Chart performance ==
Chart (2013)	Peak position
US Billboard 200	32
US Heatseekers Albums	1

== "Wake Me Up" single ==
Besides appearing on the Wake Me Up EP as track number 2 in the 5-track EP, the song "Wake Me Up" was available as a promo stand-alone single on Interscope Records and made available online for download via iTunes. The track also appears on Blacc's studio album Lift Your Spirit.

A music video of Blacc's solo version was launched as a music video in collaboration with the immigrant rights group National Day Laborer Organizing Network and the ABC* Foundation's Healing Power of Music Initiative. The video was directed by Alex Rivera and the cast were real life immigrant activists.
