= Wake Me Up (Avicii song) =

2013 single by Avicii

Single by Avicii

from the album True
- Released: 17 June 2013
- Recorded: 2012–2013
- Genre: Folktronica; progressive house; EDM
- Length: 4:09
- Label: PRMD; Island
- Songwriters: Tim Bergling; Egbert Dawkins; Mike Einziger
- Producers: Avicii; Arash Pournouri

Avicii singles chronology
"We Write the Story" (2013)	"Wake Me Up" (2013)	"You Make Me" (2013)

Music video
- "Wake Me Up" on YouTube

"Wake Me Up" (sometimes listed as "Wake Me Up!") is a song by Swedish DJ and record producer Avicii. It was released as the lead single from his debut album True on 17 June 2013, by PRMD Music and Island Records. It was written by Avicii, Mike Einziger of Incubus, and American soul singer Aloe Blacc, who provides vocals for the track. Mike Einziger provides acoustic guitar, while Peter Dyer provides keyboard on the song.

Avicii introduced "Wake Me Up" for the first time live on stage at the Ultra Music Festival in Miami. The experimental rendering (accompanied by a live band with instruments and vocalists, including Blacc, Einziger and Incubus members Ben Kenney on bass and José Pasillas on drums) reportedly confused and angered a section of the electronic dance festival community. Subsequently, Avicii achieved critical and commercial success with the release of the single worldwide.

"Wake Me Up" has been named as the highest charting dance track of the 2010s, sitting at number 13 in the 100-strong list from the official UK Singles Chart. It is the only song to crack the Billboard Decade-End without making the top three during any week. It also reached number one in much of Europe and charted well in various countries.

The song has been described as a "summer anthem" by Variance Magazine and, throughout the 2013 festival season, Avicii included it as part of the opening or closing sequence of his sets at EDC Las Vegas, EDC London, Tomorrowland, Creamfields, Electric Zoo and the iTunes Festival. Due to the success of the song, Blacc later released an acoustic version of "Wake Me Up" in his solo EP Wake Me Up. It was also released as a promotional stand-alone single on Interscope Records, made available online for downloads via iTunes. A separate music video was also made. The Blacc single charted on various charts.

== Background ==
In an interview with the Daily Star, Avicii, who had previously labelled "Wake Me Up!" as "a fun experiment" during an exclusive chat with MTV UK, said: "I had a demo with Mac Davis singing, the guy who wrote some songs that were covered by Elvis Presley, but I needed another singer to do the parts. At the same time I was tipped off about doing another track with Aloe Blacc, and I started working on that track. When I was with Mike Einziger from Incubus, we came up with the chord progression and the melody for 'Wake Me Up!' but no real lyrics. None of us sing and we really needed to get that demo down and the only person I knew that lived in LA was Aloe, so I called him and he was free. Lyrics come really easy to him so he wrote them in a couple of hours and we finished the track."

Aloe Blacc, who is not credited on the track, explained to The Huffington Post: "I started writing the lyrics at the top of 2013, travelling back from Switzerland. I started in hip hop music back in the 90s and I never expected to be singing and have an actual career as a musician, but I'm travelling all over the world and I thought 'Life is a dream, wake me up when it's all over'. I was invited to the studio with Avicii and Mike Einziger from Incubus, and when I got to the studio they had already come up with a chord progression of the song. I came in with the lyrics and I just developed the melody as I heard the chords, and we all thought it was something very strong. We finished the song that night as an acoustic version, then Avicii made the dance mix in a couple of days, and that's what we released to the world, and that was his release." Blacc later released an acoustic version of the song which was included on his solo EP Wake Me Up. It was also released as a promotional stand-alone single by Interscope Records and made available online for download via iTunes. The single also charted in its own right in various charts.

== Composition ==
"Wake Me Up" is a folktronica song, blending elements of EDM, soul and country music. Musically, it is written in the key of B minor and runs at 124 beats per minute (BPM). It follows a chord progression of Bm/G/D/A – Bm/G/D/F#, with Blacc's vocals ranging from B_{2} to B_{4}.

== Critical reception ==
Robert Copsey of Digital Spy gave the song a positive review, stating:

"As chart-friendly EDM continues to reach the furthest corners of the globe, staying ahead of the pack can prove a tricky task – especially when more and more acts arrive on the scene turning out mixes with identikit build-ups, tired lyrics and uninspired breakdowns that newcomers to the arena lap up with excitement. Kudos to Avicii then, who has dared to try something a little different for his latest offering. "So wake me up when it's all over/ When I'm wiser and I'm older," featured artist Aloe Blacc sings over dialled-up, country-flecked guitar strums that sound like Mumford & Sons on speed. The jig-along chorus may conjure up images of Brits-on-tour, but to be honest, what summer anthem doesn't?".

At the end of the year, Rolling Stone listed "Wake Me Up" at number 26 on its list of 100 Best Songs of 2013.

== Commercial performance ==
The single has peaked at number one in 22 countries to date, including Australia, New Zealand, Hungary, Ireland, the United Kingdom and several European countries, in addition to reaching the top 10 in six others. The song is also the most searched on the Apple owned music identifying app Shazam with more than 23 million in February 2018.

In Australia, the song debuted at number 42 on 24 June. Two weeks later it reached the top spot, making it both Avicii's and Blacc's highest-charting single in the country. On its sixth week at the top, 12 August, "Wake Me Up" became the longest-running number one by a Swedish act since Roxette's 1989 hit "The Look". In Ireland, "Wake Me Up" spent seven consecutive weeks at number one. "Wake Me Up!" has performed well in the North American music markets, having peaked in Canada and the United States at number two and number four, respectively. It spent 21 weeks in the top ten of the Billboard Hot 100, and 54 non-consecutive weeks overall, making it the first Dance/Electronic song to stay over a year on that chart. It also reached number one position in the 7 September 2013 issue of Billboard's Dance/Mix Show Airplay Chart. In Canada it was the second best-selling song of 2013 with 519,000 copies sold (523,000 for all versions combined). It is the first dance/electronic song to sell over 4 million copies in the U.S., and as of August 2015 it has sold over 4,060,000 copies.

In July 2013, "Wake Me Up" entered at the number one on the UK Singles Chart, becoming Avicii's second UK number one and selling 88,000 copies in its first day and 267,000 in its first week, becoming Britain's fastest-selling single of 2013 at the time of writing. Following three weeks at number one, "Wake Me Up" spent a further four consecutive weeks at number two, and a total of 11 consecutive weeks in the top ten. By October 2013, the single had sold over 1 million copies in the UK, becoming the 140th single to do so in UK chart history and the third single of 2013 to do so. "Wake Me Up" was also the fifth most streamed track of 2013 in the UK. The song also spent nine consecutive weeks at number one on the UK Dance Chart until being replaced by Avicii's next single "You Make Me".

== Music videos ==
A lyric video to accompany the release of "Wake Me Up" was first released on YouTube 28 June 2013, at a total length of four minutes and thirty two seconds, and teaser clips for the official video were also released.

The official video for the song was released a month after the lyric video on 29 July. It was directed by celebrity photographer Mark Seliger and co-directed and edited by CB "Barney" Miller (former guitarist for 1980's pop band Miller Miller Miller & Sloan). It features a woman and a young girl, intended to be sisters, portrayed respectively by Russian model Kristina Romanova and Laneya Grace. It depicts them and how they are different from the people in their dreary village, as Laneya mentioned that people are seen looking at the two often with disgust and revulsion except for one of them. One morning, Kristina gets up early and rides off on a horse to a nearby city. Once in the city, she finds how welcoming and accepting the people are of her. She notices a woman with the Avicii logo birthmark like the one on her lower arm. They meet others and then jump into a truck and are then shown to be attending an Avicii concert. The next morning, Kristina rides back home on the horse and tells Laneya that she found "somewhere [they] belong" as they pack up all their belongings and depart the village for good. The video ends with them walking down the highway as they move into the city and shots from the concert and one of the staring villagers from the beginning seeming to notice and depressed by the sisters' departure before resuming her uninspired life.

The video includes product placement from Denim & Supply by Ralph Lauren and the Sony Xperia Z smartphone, used to capture a group selfie at the concert. The video was shot by the Santa Clara River orange groves, in the town of Piru, California, northwest of Los Angeles, and Downtown LA as well as concert footage from an Avicii performing at the 2013 Ultra Music Festival in Miami. As of January 2025, the video has 2.4 billion views on Avicii's official YouTube channel, making it one of the 60 most viewed videos on the site.

In addition, his own channel Avicii collaborated with the YouTube channel "Yo Mama" to produce the official music video for the single on his remix album, True: Avicii By Avicii. It was directed by Zachary James and Alex Negrete.

== Track listing ==
- Digital download
1. "Wake Me Up" – 4:09
2. "Wake Me Up" (Mr. Worldwide Remix) – 3:38
- Digital download — remixes
1. "Wake Me Up" (Avicii Speed remix) – 7:04
2. "Wake Me Up" (reggae mix) – 4:31
- Digital download — remixes
1. "Wake Me Up" (Avicii Speed remix) – 7:04
2. "Wake Me Up" (original extended mix) – 5:44
3. "Wake Me Up" (reggae remix) – 4:31
- Digital download — remixes (part 2)
1. "Wake Me Up" (PANG! Slow Things Down remix) – 6:12
2. "Wake Me Up" (EDX Miami Sunset remix) – 6:32
- CD single
1. "Wake Me Up" (radio edit) – 4:09
2. "Wake Me Up" (instrumental) – 4:32

== Credits ==
=== Personnel ===
- Avicii – songwriter, producer
- Aloe Blacc – lead vocals, songwriter
- Arash Pournouri – co-producer
- Mike Einziger – guitar, songwriter
- Peter Dyer – keyboards

Adapted from CD single and BMI website.

== Charts ==
=== Weekly charts ===
Chart (2013–2017)	Peak position
Australia (ARIA)	1
Austria (Ö3 Austria Top 40)	1
Belgium (Ultratop 50 Flanders)	1
Belgium (Ultratop 50 Wallonia)	1
Brazil (Billboard Brasil Hot 100)	1
Bulgaria Airplay (BAMP)	1
Canada Hot 100 (Billboard)	2
CIS Airplay (TopHit)	1
Colombia Airplay (National-Report)	19
Czech Republic Airplay (ČNS IFPI)	1
Czech Republic Singles Digital (ČNS IFPI)	4
Denmark (Tracklisten)	1
Finland (Suomen virallinen lista)	1
France (SNEP)	1
Germany (GfK)	1
Greece Airplay (IFPI)	1
Greece Digital Songs (Billboard)	1
Hungary (Dance Top 40)	1
Hungary (Rádiós Top 40)	1
Hungary (Single Top 40)	1
Ireland (IRMA)	1
Israel International Airplay (Media Forest)	1
Italy (FIMI)	1
Japan Hot 100 (Billboard)	6
Lebanon (Lebanese Top 20)	1
Luxembourg Digital Song Sales (Billboard)	1
Mexico Anglo Airplay (Monitor Latino)	2
Netherlands (Dutch Top 40)	1
Netherlands (Single Top 100)	1
New Zealand (Recorded Music NZ)	1
Norway (VG-lista)	1
Poland Airplay (ZPAV)	1
Poland Dance (ZPAV)	1
Portugal Digital Songs (Billboard)	1
Romania (Airplay 100)	1
Russia Airplay (TopHit)	1
Scottish Singles Sales (Official Charts)	1
Slovakia Airplay (ČNS IFPI)	1
Slovakia Singles Digital (ČNS IFPI)	22
Slovenia Airplay (SloTop50)	1
Slovakia Singles Digital (ČNS IFPI)	30
South Africa Airplay (EMA)	3
Spain (Promusicae)	1
Sweden (Sverigetopplistan)	1
Switzerland (Schweizer Hitparade)	1
UK Singles (Official Charts)	1
UK Dance (Official Charts)	1
Ukraine Airplay (TopHit)	10
US Billboard Hot 100	4
US Hot Dance/Electronic Songs (Billboard)	1
US Adult Contemporary (Billboard)	5
US Adult Pop Airplay (Billboard)	1
US Dance Club Songs (Billboard)	1
US Pop Airplay (Billboard)	1
US Rhythmic Airplay (Billboard)	14
US Rock & Alternative Airplay (Billboard)	5
Venezuela Pop Rock General (Record Report)	1

Chart (2018)	Peak position
Canada Hot 100 (Billboard)	8
Portugal (AFP)	22
US Billboard Hot 100	34

2021–2026 weekly chart performance
Chart (2021–2026)	Peak position
Belarus Airplay (TopHit)	135
Colombia Anglo Airplay (National-Report)	3
CIS Airplay (TopHit)	119
Estonia Airplay (TopHit)	150
Global 200 (Billboard)	95
Kazakhstan Airplay (TopHit)	193
Latvia Airplay (TopHit)	98
Lithuania Airplay (TopHit)	77
Romania Airplay (TopHit)	73
Russia Airplay (TopHit)	164
Ukraine Airplay (TopHit)	169

=== Monthly charts ===
2026 monthly chart performance
Chart (2026)	Peak position
Lithuania Airplay (TopHit)	88

=== Year-end charts ===
Chart (2013)	Position
Australia (ARIA)	4
Austria (Ö3 Austria Top 40)	1
Belgium (Ultratop Flanders)	1
Belgium (Ultratop Wallonia)	8
Canada (Canadian Hot 100)	7
France (SNEP)	7
Germany (Official German Charts)	1
Hungary (Dance Top 40)	11
Hungary (Rádiós Top 40)	9
Israel International Airplay (Media Forest)	2
Netherlands (Dutch Top 40)	2
Netherlands (Single Top 100)	1
New Zealand (Recorded Music NZ)	8
Russian Airplay (TopHit)	14
Slovenian Airplay (SloTop50)	1
Spain (PROMUSICAE)	5
Sweden (Sverigetopplistan)	1
Switzerland (Schweizer Hitparade)	1
Ukrainian Airplay (TopHit)	27
UK Singles (Official Charts Company)	3
US Billboard Hot 100	19
US Adult Top 40 (Billboard)	35
US Dance Club Songs (Billboard)	6
US Hot Dance/Electronic Songs (Billboard)	3
US Mainstream Top 40 (Billboard)	17
Chart (2014)	Position
Belgium (Ultratop Flanders)	30
Belgium (Ultratop Wallonia)	37
Brazil Airplay (Crowley)	63
Canada (Canadian Hot 100)	21
France (SNEP)	68
Germany (Official German Charts)	92
Hungary (Dance Top 40)	25
Hungary (Single Top 40)	31
Japan (Japan Hot 100)	80
Japanese Adult Contemporary (Billboard)	16
Netherlands (Single Top 100)	44
Russian Airplay (TopHit)	24
Slovenian Airplay (SloTop50)	17
Spain (PROMUSICAE)	46
Sweden (Sverigetopplistan)	8
Switzerland (Schweizer Hitparade)	34
Ukrainian Airplay (TopHit)	81
UK Singles (Official Charts Company)	70
US Billboard Hot 100	22
US Adult Contemporary (Billboard)	8
US Adult Top 40 (Billboard)	23
US Hot Dance/Electronic Songs (Billboard)	2
US Mainstream Top 40 (Billboard)	41
US Rock Airplay (Billboard)	44
Chart (2015)	Position
France (SNEP)	178
Chart (2018)	Position
Hungary (Single Top 40)	69
Portugal Download (AFP)	187
Sweden (Sverigetopplistan)	15
US Hot Dance/Electronic Songs (Billboard)	49
Chart (2019)	Position
Sweden (Sverigetopplistan)	59
Chart (2021)	Position
Sweden (Sverigetopplistan)	94
Chart (2022)	Position
Australia (ARIA)	100
Global Excl. US (Billboard)	114
Chart (2023)	Position
Romanian Airplay (TopHit)	137
Chart (2024)	Position
Australian Dance (ARIA)	9
CIS Airplay (TopHit)	178
Chart (2025)	Position
CIS Airplay (TopHit)	164
Romanian Airplay (TopHit)	180
Sweden (Sverigetopplistan)	88

=== Decade-end charts ===
Chart (2010–2019)	Position
Australia (ARIA)	11
Germany (Official German Charts)	4
Netherlands (Dutch Top 40)	3
Netherlands (Single Top 100)	3
Ukrainian Airplay (TopHit)	167
UK Singles (Official Charts Company)	13
US Billboard Hot 100	57
US Hot Dance/Electronic Songs (Billboard)	4

=== All-time charts ===
Chart	Position
UK Singles (Official Charts Company)	43
US Billboard Pop Songs (1992–2017)	12

== Certifications ==
Region	Certification	Certified units/sales
Australia (ARIA)	15× Platinum	1,050,000^{‡}
Austria (IFPI Austria)	2× Platinum	60,000^{*}
Belgium (BRMA)	4× Platinum	80,000^{‡}
Brazil (Pro-Música Brasil)	6× Diamond	1,500,000^{‡}
Canada (Music Canada)	Platinum	523,000
Denmark (IFPI Danmark)	2× Platinum	60,000^{^}
Finland (Musiikkituottajat)	Gold	8,647
France	—	200,000
Germany (BVMI)	11× Gold	1,650,000^{‡}
Italy (FIMI)	5× Platinum	150,000^{‡}
Japan (RIAJ)	Platinum	250,000^{*}
Mexico (AMPROFON)	2× Platinum	120,000^{*}
Netherlands (NVPI)	8× Platinum	160,000^{^}
New Zealand (RMNZ)	9× Platinum	270,000^{‡}
Norway (IFPI Norway)	7× Platinum	70,000^{‡}
Portugal (AFP)	4× Platinum	80,000^{‡}
Spain (Promusicae)	4× Platinum	240,000^{‡}
Sweden (GLF)	13× Platinum	520,000^{‡}
Switzerland (IFPI Switzerland)	3× Platinum	90,000^{^}
United Kingdom (BPI)	7× Platinum	4,200,000^{‡}
United States (RIAA)	11× Platinum	11,000,000^{‡}
Streaming
Denmark (IFPI Danmark)	6× Platinum	10,800,000^{†}
Japan (RIAJ)	Platinum	100,000,000^{†}
Spain (Promusicae)	2× Platinum	16,000,000^{†}
Summaries
Worldwide (IFPI)	—	11,100,000
^{*} Sales figures based on certification alone.^{^} Shipments figures based on certification alone.^{‡} Sales+streaming figures based on certification alone.^{†} Streaming-only figures based on certification alone.

== Release history ==
Country	Date	Format	Label
Worldwide	17 June 2013	Digital download	PRMD; Universal
Italy	17 June 2013	Digital download	PRMD; Universal
Spain	17 June 2013	Digital download	PRMD; Universal
United Kingdom	17 June 2013	Digital download	PRMD; Universal
United States	2 July 2013	Digital download	PRMD; Universal; Island
United States	29 July 2013	Adult contemporary radio	PRMD; Universal; Island
United States	29 July 2013	Triple A radio	PRMD; Universal; Island
United States	30 July 2013	Alternative radio	PRMD; Universal; Island
United States	30 July 2013	Mainstream radio; rhythmic top 40 radio	PRMD; Universal; Island

== Acoustic version ==
"Wake Me Up"
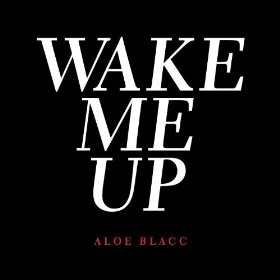

Single by Aloe Blacc

from the album Wake Me Up EP and Lift Your Spirit
- Released: 30 September 2013
- Recorded: 2013
- Genre: Folk; soul
- Length: 3:45
- Label: Interscope
- Songwriters: Mike Einziger; Tim Bergling; Egbert Nathaniel Dawkins III
- Producer: DJ Khalil

Aloe Blacc singles chronology
"Green Lights" (2011)	"Wake Me Up" (2013)	"The Man" (2014)

Music video
- "Wake Me Up (acoustic)" on YouTube

On 30 September 2013, Blacc released his own acoustic version of the song. The track appeared on the Wake Me Up EP as track number two in the 5-track EP. "Wake Me Up (Acoustic)" was released as a promotional stand-alone single on Interscope Records and made available online for downloads via iTunes. The track also appears on Blacc's full studio album Lift Your Spirit.

=== Music video ===
In October 2013, Blacc released the music video for "Wake Me Up". Blacc collaborated with the immigrant rights group National Day Laborer Organizing Network and the ABC* Foundation's Healing Power of Music Initiative. The director is Alex Rivera. The cast were real life immigrant activists: Hareth Andrade Ayala (a Virginia leader in the immigrant youth movement working to stop her own father's deportation), Agustin Chiprez Alvarez (a Los Angeles day laborer), and Margarita Reyes (who was deported with her mother as a child despite being born in the US).

=== Chart performance ===
==== Weekly charts ====
Chart (2013)	Peak position
Austria (Ö3 Austria Top 40)	71
Belgium (Ultratip Bubbling Under Flanders)	3
Belgium (Ultratop 50 Wallonia)	30
France (SNEP)	20
Germany (GfK)	42
Netherlands (Single Top 100)	24
Switzerland (Schweizer Hitparade)	23
UK Singles (Official Charts Company)	79
US Bubbling Under Hot 100 (Billboard)	11

==== Year-end charts ====
Chart (2013)	Position
France (SNEP)	188
Chart (2014)	Position
France (SNEP)	189

=== Certifications ===
Region	Certification	Certified units/sales
Brazil (Pro-Música Brasil)	Gold	30,000^{‡}
^{‡} Sales+streaming figures based on certification alone.

== Cover versions ==
=== Tebey version ===
"Wake Me Up"

Single by Tebey featuring Emerson Drive

from the album Two
- Released: 27 November 2013
- Genre: Country
- Length: 4:35
- Label: TebeyMusic; Road Angel (CAN); The Talent Associates (US)
- Producers: Tebey; Danick Dupelle

Tebey singles chronology
"Let It Down" (2013)	"Wake Me Up" (2013)	"Now I Do" (2014)

Emerson Drive singles chronology
"She Always Gets What She Wants" (2013)	"Wake Me Up" (2013)	"Who We Are" (2015)

"Wake Me Up" was covered in the style of country music in 2013 by the Canadian country singer Tebey featuring the band Emerson Drive. This version was released to digital retailers via TebeyMusic on 27 November 2013 as the third single from the former's second studio album, Two (2014) before impacting radio in January 2014. The song was released in the US on 28 January 2014 through The Talent Associates. It was well received by Canadian country radio, peaking at No. 5 on the Canada Country airplay chart. The song is also included on Tebey's 2016 EP, Old School.

==== Track listing ====
Digital download
No.	Title	Length
1.	"Wake Me Up" (featuring Emerson Drive)	4:35

==== Chart performance ====
"Wake Me Up", as performed by Tebey and Emerson Drive, entered the Canadian Hot 100 at No. 63 for the week ending 1 February 2014. It peaked at No. 56 for the week ending 29 March 2014, which position it held for one chart week.

==== Weekly charts ====
Chart (2014)	Peak position
Canada Hot 100 (Billboard)	56
Canada Country (Billboard)	5

==== Certifications ====
Region	Certification	Certified units/sales
Canada (Music Canada)	Gold	40,000^{‡}
^{‡} Sales+streaming figures based on certification alone.

=== Britton Buchanan and Alicia Keys version ===
"Wake Me Up"

Single by Britton Buchanan and Alicia Keys

from the album The Complete Season 14 Collection
- Released: 21 April 2018
- Label: Republic Records

"Wake Me Up" was covered by the American recording artists Alicia Keys and Britton Buchanan during Season 14 of the singing competition The Voice. Buchanan and Keys performed the song as a tribute to Avicii who had died a little over a month earlier. Studio version of the song was released as a single on 21 May 2018 through Republic Records. The song appears on Buchanan's album The Complete Season 14 Collection (The Voice Performance).

==== Track listing ====
Digital download
No.	Title	Length
1.	"Wake Me Up" (The Voice Performance)	3:28

==== Live performance ====
Buchanan and Keys performed the song live on the Season 14 finale of The Voice on 21 May 2018. They performed a stripped down rendition of the song and dedicated their performance to Avicii, with Keys saying "This one's for you Avicii! We're celebrating life, love and finding ourselves!". Amanda Bell of Entertainment Weekly wrote that "his whimpering tones are a good match for this piece, and her ability to break away is always pretty strong" but concluded that the performance was "still a bit boring".

=== Spark Productions cover ===
In the United Kingdom, the original release date was intended to be 8 September 2013. In the absence of the original, a group called "Spark Productions" took advantage and released a cover version of it; this version reached number 26 on the UK Singles Chart before Avicii conceded to public demand and decided to release it early, with the Official Charts Company announcing on 15 July 2013 that it would be released that week.

=== Children in Need 2014 version ===
"Wake Me Up"

Single by Gareth Malone's All Star Choir
- Released: 9 November 2014
- Recorded: 2014
- Genre: Pop
- Length: 3:55
- Label: Decca

Music video
- "Wake Me Up" on YouTube

Performed by Gareth Malone's All Star Choir, the song was released as the official BBC Children in Need single for 2014. Choirmaster and broadcaster Gareth Malone has previously had chart success after putting together non-singers and turning them into a cohesive choir. In 2011, he guided the Military Wives – a group of women with partners serving overseas in the army – to Christmas number one with the song "Wherever You Are". In 2012, in collaboration with Gary Barlow, Malone produced the song "Sing", as part of the Diamond Jubilee celebrations, with the Commonwealth Band being joined by the Military Wives.

Malone was chosen to create the official Children in Need single for 2014, and his efforts were captured in a two-part series, Gareth Malone's All Star Choir, which aired on 3 November and 10 November. The BBC press release said that Malone would "bring together an array of untrained voices from the world of television sport and theatre" for the single.

The celebrities that make up the All Star Choir are Margaret Alphonsi, Jo Brand, Radzi Chinyanganya, John Craven, Mel Giedroyc, Nitin Ganatra, Larry Lamb, Alice Levine, Fabrice Muamba, Craig Revel Horwood, Linda Robson and Alison Steadman.

==== Promotion and live performances ====
Gareth Malone went on numerous television and radio shows to promote the song, including some presented by celebrities who feature on the record. This included spots on Loose Women, Blue Peter, The One Show and Alice Levine's afternoon show on Radio 1.

==== Chart performance ====
After its release on 9 November, the song was placed at number 1 on the midweek Official Chart Update on Radio 1, ahead of "Thinking Out Loud" by Ed Sheeran and Cheryl's "I Don't Care", which was number one the previous weekend.

==== Weekly charts ====
Chart (2014)	Peak position
Euro Digital Song Sales (Billboard)	1
Scottish Singles Sales (Official Charts)	1
UK Singles (Official Charts)	1

=== MØ version ===
"Wake Me Up"

Promotional single by MØ

from the album Plæygirl
- Released: 6 December 2024
- Genre: Electropop
- Length: 4:15
- Label: Sony UK
- Composers: Tim Bergling; Aloe Blacc; Mike Einziger; Ash Pournouri
- Producer: Nick Sylvester

Music video
- "Wake Me Up" on YouTube

A cover of "Wake Me Up" was recorded by the Danish singer and songwriter MØ, as the promotional single for her album Plæygirl. It was released on 6 December 2024, via Sony Music.

According to MØ, she was inspired to record her version of the song, as a tribute to Avicii. She recalled hearing his song "Levels" back at a rooftop party in 2012, in New York; "[there's] something about the unapologetic, almost aggressive energy mixed with a haunting emotional depth made me make up my mind to follow my dreams of becoming an artist, whatever the cost. I was working with some of his friends out of his house in LA, in the days leading up to his passing. I remember having felt so honoured to be working out of this Scandinavian legend's studio. He changed music, and he changed me. Forever I will be remembered, enchanted and inspired by angel Avicii." Mø was a friend of the DJ before his death, and the two had previously collaborated in the track "Dear Boy".

=== Other notable covers ===
A cover of the song in Irish was uploaded onto YouTube on 9 August 2013, by TG Lurgan, a music project by the Irish-language summer college Coláiste Lurgan. The video received widespread coverage in the media. The video was a viral hit within the country and with Irish abroad, hitting a million views in one week.

The British band You Me at Six made a country version for BBC Radio 1's Live Lounge. James Shotwel commented that their cover "will be pulling at your heart strings all day long. The once fun-loving track has taken a turn for the melancholy, but it plays so well you'll hardly think twice about the change."

Jessica Mauboy covered the song on 14 October 2016 For her 2016 album, The Secret Daughter: Songs from the Original TV Series. It reached number 34 on the Australian ARIA Singles Chart.

In 2018, a collaboration by Tommee Profitt and Fleurie was charted on iTunes Top 50 and on Spotify's Top 50 Viral chart and was used in the trailer for Laika's movie Wildwood in 2026.

== See also ==
- List of Airplay 100 number ones of the 2010s
- List of best-selling singles
- List of best-selling singles in Australia
- List of best-selling singles in the United States
- List of million-selling singles in the United Kingdom
- List of Billboard Hot 100 top 10 singles in 2013
- List of number-one singles of 2013 (Australia)
- List of number-one hits of 2013 (Austria)
- List of number-one hits of 2013 (Denmark)
- List of top 10 singles in 2013 (France)
- List of number-one hits of 2013 (Germany)
- List of number-one singles of 2013 (Ireland)
- List of number-one hits of 2013 (Italy)
- List of number-one songs of 2013 (Mexico)
- List of number-one singles from the 2010s (New Zealand)
- List of number-one singles of 2013 (Poland)
- List of number-one hits of 2013 (Scotland)
- List of number-one singles of 2013 (Spain)
- List of number-one hits of 2013 (Switzerland)
- List of UK Singles Chart number ones of the 2010s
- List of number-one dance singles of 2013 (U.S.)
- Hedonism
