= Emma Higgins (filmmaker) =

Canadian filmmaker

Emma Higgins is a Canadian filmmaker from Vancouver, British Columbia. She is most noted as the winner of the Juno Award for Video of the Year at the Juno Awards of 2021, for her music video for Jessie Reyez's "No One's in the Room". She was also a nominee in the same category at the Juno Awards of 2018 for Mother Mother's "The Drugs", and at the Juno Awards of 2023 for Reyez's "Fraud".

She has also directed music videos for artists including Brett Kissel, Ingrid Andress, Tegan and Sara, Tebey, Wes Mack, Cold Creek County and Nikki Yanovsky.

Her debut feature film, Sweetness, went into production in 2024, and is slated to premiere at SXSW in 2025.
