= Sons of Daughters =

Canadian country music duo

- Origin: Vancouver, British Columbia, Canada
- Genres: Country
- Years active: 2013–present
- Labels: Open Road; Fontana North
- Past members: Chrystal Leigh; Jimmy Thow
- Website: www.sonsofdaughters.com

Sons of Daughters was a Canadian country music duo, composed of Chrystal Leigh and Jimmy Thow. They were featured on season one of CTV's The Launch. Their first widely released single "Ain’t Gonna Be Lonely Long" charted in the top 15 of the Canadian country radio play charts for four consecutive weeks in 2019. They were nominated for the Rising Star Award of the Canadian Country Music Association (CCMA) in 2019 and 2020.

== Discography ==
=== Extended plays ===
List of extended plays, with selected details
Title	Details
Pick Your Poison	Released: 2016; Label: self-released
Love in a Bar	Released: 2019; Label: Open Road

=== Singles ===
List of singles, with selected chart positions, showing year released and album name
Title	Year	Peak chart positions	Album
Title	Year	CAN Country	Album
"Ain't Gonna Be Lonely Long"	2019	13	Love in a Bar
"I Picture You"	2019	44	Non-album singles
"Drinks Well with Others"	2020	—	Non-album singles
"—" denotes a recording that did not chart or was not released in that territory.

=== Music videos ===
List of music videos, showing year released and directors
Title	Year	Director(s)
"Ain't Gonna Be Lonely Long"	2018	Wes Mack
"What If We Stay"	2019	Travis Didluck
"I Picture You"	2020	Ryan Nolan
"Drinks Well with Others"	2020	Brian K. Vaughan

== Awards and nominations ==
Year	Award	Category	Nominee/work	Result	Ref.
2019	CCMA Awards	Rising Star Award	Sons of Daughters	Nominated	
2020	CCMA Awards	Rising Star Award	Sons of Daughters	Nominated	
