= Tinie Tempah discography =

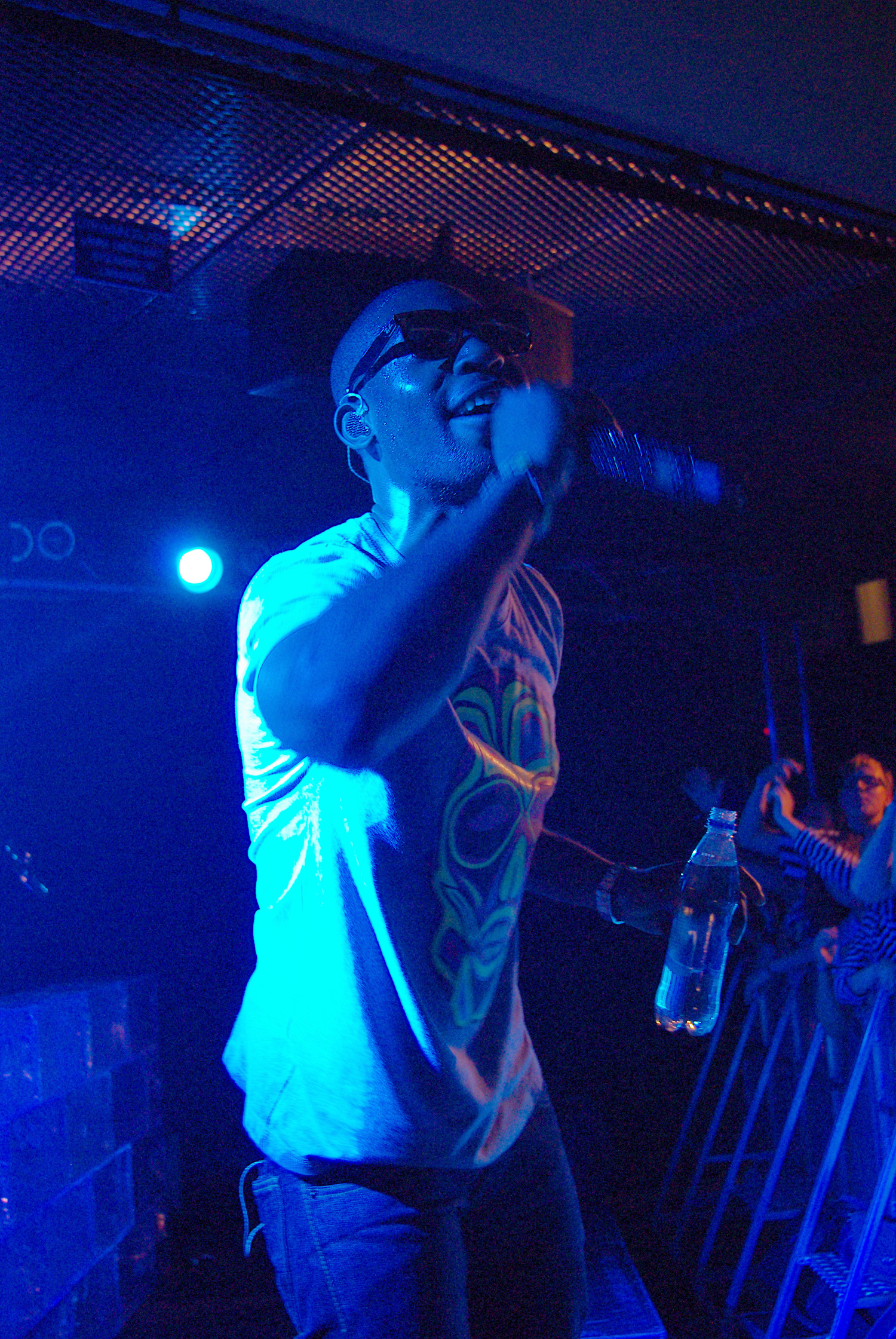
- Tinie at the 2010 Way Out West Festival
- Studio albums: 4
- Extended plays: 2
- Singles: 42
- Music videos: 32

The discography of Tinie Tempah, a British rapper, contains four studio albums, two extended plays, forty-two singles (including twelve as a featured artist and 7 number 1 singles.) and thirty-two music videos.

Tinie released his debut single "Pass Out" in February 2010. Featuring the track's producer Labrinth, the single debuted at number one on the UK chart. "Frisky" was released in June 2010 as Tinie's second single, which debuted at number two in the UK and number three in Ireland. The rapper's debut studio album Disc-Overy (2010) reached number one in the United Kingdom, where it has since been certified as double platinum by the British Phonographic Industry (BPI). An additional two singles preceded the release of the album: "Written in the Stars", which features Eric Turner and "Miami 2 Ibiza", a collaboration with Swedish House Mafia; the latter of which reached number four in the UK. "Written in the Stars" saw Tinie attain international chart success, reaching number twelve on the Billboard Hot 100, which also became his second number one single in the United Kingdom. The singles "Invincible", featuring Kelly Rowland; "Wonderman", featuring Ellie Goulding; "Simply Unstoppable" and "Till I'm Gone", featuring Wiz Khalifa were all released from Disc-Overy, reaching peaks of number eleven, number twelve, number thirty-three and number twenty-four respectively in the United Kingdom.

The campaign for Tinie's second studio album Demonstration (2013) was launched in August 2013 with the release of "Trampoline". Featuring 2 Chainz, the single debuted at number three in the United Kingdom and became Tinie's fifth UK top ten hit in the process. "Children of the Sun", which features John Martin, was released in October 2013 ahead of the album, reaching a peak of number six. Demonstration was released on 4 November in the United Kingdom and debuted at number three, also reaching peaks of number twenty-two in Australia and number forty in New Zealand.

== Albums ==
=== Studio albums ===
Title	Album details	Peak chart positions								Certifications
Title	Album details	UK	AUS	AUT	CAN	IRE	NZ	SWI	US	Certifications
Disc-Overy	Released: 1 October 2010; Label: Disturbing London, Parlophone; Formats: CD, LP, digital download	1	71	—	24	2	31	73	21	BPI: 3× Platinum; RMNZ: Platinum
Demonstration	Released: 1 November 2013; Label: Disturbing London, Parlophone; Formats: CD, LP, digital download	3	22	66	—	13	40	29	—	BPI: Gold
Youth	Released: 14 April 2017; Label: Disturbing London, Parlophone; Formats: CD, LP, digital download	9	—	—	—	76	—	99	—	BPI: Gold; RMNZ: Gold
The Night's Not Dead	Released: 16 October 2026; Label: Imhotep Records; Formats: CD, LP, digital download	20	—	—	—	—	—	—	—	
"—" denotes an album that did not chart or was not released in that territory.

=== Mixtapes ===
Title	Details	Peak chart positions
Title	Details	UK
Chapter 1 Verse 1-22	Released: 22 January 2005; Label: Disturbing London; Format: Digital download	—
Hood Economics Room 147	Released: 26 November 2007; Label: Disturbing London; Format: Digital download	—
The Micro Mixtape (hosted by DJ Whoo Kid)	Released: 5 December 2010; Label: Disturbing London; Format: Digital download	—
Foreign Object (hosted by DJ Whoo Kid)	Released: 12 May 2011; Label: Disturbing London; Format: Digital download	—
Happy Birthday	Released: 16 December 2011; Label: Disturbing London; Format: Digital download	97
Junk Food	Released: 14 December 2015; Label: Disturbing London; Format: Digital download	73
"—" denotes an album that did not chart or was not released in that territory.

== Extended plays ==
Title	Details
Sexy Beast Vol. 1	Released: 3 June 2009; Label: Disturbing London; Format: Digital download
iTunes Festival: London 2010	Released: 6 August 2010; Label: Disturbing London; Format: Digital download
9PM	Released: 7 August 2026; Label: Imhotep Records; Format: Digital download
12AM	Released: 4 September 2026; Label: Imhotep Records; Format: Digital download
3AM	Released: 2 October 2026; Label: Imhotep Records; Format: Digital download

== Singles ==
=== As lead artist ===
Title	Year	Peak chart positions										Certifications	Album
Title	Year	UK	AUS	AUT	DEN	IRE	NL	NZ	SWE	SWI	US	Certifications	Album
"Tears" (featuring Cleo Sol)	2008	— (Note: "Tears" did not enter the UK Singles Chart Top 100, but debuted and peaked at number 50 on the UK Independent Singles Chart.)	—	—	—	—	—	—	—	—	—		Non-album single
"Pass Out"	2010	1	70	—	—	6	54	33	—	—	—	BPI: 2× Platinum; ARIA: Gold; RMNZ: Platinum	Disc-Overy
"Frisky" (featuring Labrinth)	2010	2	—	—	—	3	—	—	—	—	—	BPI: Platinum	Disc-Overy
"Written in the Stars" (featuring Eric Turner)	2010	1	34	75	18	1	19	13	10	47	12	BPI: 2× Platinum; ARIA: Platinum; MC: Platinum; GLF: Platinum; RIAA: Platinum; RMNZ: Platinum	Disc-Overy
"Miami 2 Ibiza" (Note: "Miami 2 Ibiza" is also included on Swedish House Mafia's second studio album Until Now.) (with Swedish House Mafia)	2010	4	—	36	22	5	10	—	10	19	—	BPI: Platinum; ARIA: 2× Platinum; GLF: 5× Platinum; RMNZ: Gold	Disc-Overy
"Invincible" (featuring Kelly Rowland)	2010	11	38	62	—	13	53	5	—	33	—	BPI: Silver; RMNZ: Gold	Disc-Overy
"Wonderman" (featuring Ellie Goulding)	2011	12	—	—	—	16	—	—	—	—	—	BPI: Gold	Disc-Overy
"Till I'm Gone" (featuring Wiz Khalifa)	2011	24	—	—	—	32	—	—	—	69	90	BPI: Silver	Disc-Overy
"Trampoline" (featuring 2 Chainz)	2013	3	61	—	—	29	—	—	—	—	—	BPI: Silver	Demonstration
"Children of the Sun" (featuring John Martin)	2013	6	74	43	—	22	—	—	—	47	—	BPI: Silver	Demonstration
"Lover Not a Fighter" (featuring Labrinth)	2014	16	—	—	—	30	—	—	—	—	—		Demonstration
"Not Letting Go" (Note: "Not Letting Go" is also included on the deluxe edition of Jess Glynne's debut studio album I Cry When I Laugh.) (featuring Jess Glynne)	2015	1	24	—	—	8	42	31	—	—	—	BPI: Platinum; ARIA: Gold; RMNZ: Platinum	Youth
"Girls Like" (featuring Zara Larsson)	2016	5	15	—	25	12	10	17	21	—	—	BPI: Platinum; ARIA: Platinum; IFPI Den: Gold; RMNZ: 2× Platinum	Youth
"Mamacita" (featuring Wizkid)	2016	45	—	—	—	71	—	—	—	—	—	BPI: Silver	Youth
"Text from Your Ex" (featuring Tinashe)	2017	23	—	—	—	60	—	—	—	—	—	BPI: Silver	Youth
"Find Me" (featuring Jake Bugg)	2017	—	—	—	—	—	—	—	—	—	—		Youth
"Dum Dum" (with Kideko and Becky G)	2017	—	—	—	—	—	—	—	—	—	—		Non-album singles
"Top Winners" (featuring Not3s)	2020	64	—	—	—	—	—	—	—	—	—		Non-album singles
"Moncler" (featuring Tion Wayne)	2020	—	—	—	—	—	—	—	—	—	—		Non-album singles
"Whoppa" (featuring Sofía Reyes & Farina)	2020	—	—	—	—	—	—	—	—	—	—		Non-album singles
"Diamonds" (with Martin Garrix and Julian Jordan)	2021	—	—	—	—	—	—	—	—	—	—		Non-album singles
"Love Me Like This" (featuring Maia Wright)	2021	—	—	—	—	—	—	—	—	—	—		Non-album singles
"How You Samba" (with Kris Kross Amsterdam & Sofia Reyes)	2023	—	—	—	—	—	4	—	—	—	—		Non-album singles
"Blazin" (with Timmy Trumpet & Enisa)	2023	—	—	—	—	—	—	—	—	—	—		Non-album singles
"Eat It Up" (with Skepsis featuring Carla Monroe)	2025	— (Note: "Eat It Up" did not enter the UK Singles Chart Top 100, but peaked at number 86 on the UK Singles Downloads Chart, and at number 89 on the UK Singles Sales Chart.)	—	—	—	—	—	—	—	—	—		The Night's Not Dead
"Closer" (with Abi Flynn)	2025	—	—	—	—	—	—	—	—	—	—		The Night's Not Dead
"Energy" (with Alex Mills)	2025	—	—	—	—	—	—	—	—	—	—		The Night's Not Dead
"Living Life" (with Daecolm)	2026	—	—	—	—	—	—	—	—	—	—		The Night's Not Dead
"Heaven or Hell" (with Reggie)	2026	—	—	—	—	—	—	—	—	—	—		The Night's Not Dead
"To the Floor (Vai Descendo)" (with Tropkillaz and Afrojack)	2026	—	—	—	—	—	—	—	—	—	—		The Night's Not Dead
"—" denotes a single that did not chart or was not released in that territory.

=== As featured artist ===
Title	Year	Peak chart positions								Certifications	Album
Title	Year	UK	AUS	AUT	DEN	FRA	IRE	NL	NZ	Certifications	Album
"Eyes Wide Shut" (JLS featuring Tinie Tempah)	2011	8	—	—	—	—	14	—	—	BPI: Gold	Outta This World
"Hitz" (Chase & Status featuring Tinie Tempah)	2011	39	—	—	—	—	—	—	—		No More Idols
"Earthquake" (Labrinth featuring Tinie Tempah)	2011	2	4	—	—	—	12	55	5	BPI: 2× Platinum; ARIA: 4× Platinum; RMNZ: 2× Platinum	Electronic Earth
"R.I.P." (Rita Ora featuring Tinie Tempah)	2012	1	10	51	26	—	11	56	28	BPI: Platinum; ARIA: Platinum; IFPI DEN: Gold; RMNZ: Gold	Ora
"Drinking from the Bottle" (Calvin Harris featuring Tinie Tempah)	2013	5	16	—	—	62	9	44	34	BPI: Platinum; ARIA: 2× Platinum; RMNZ: Gold	18 Months
"Tsunami (Jump)" (DVBBS and Borgeous featuring Tinie Tempah)	2014	1	10	—	—	—	7	—	8	BPI: Gold; ARIA: Platinum; RMNZ: Gold	Demonstration (iTunes version)
"Crazy Stupid Love" (Cheryl Cole featuring Tinie Tempah)	2014	1	43	—	—	172	1	—	—	BPI: Platinum	Only Human
"Slick Rick" (J Spades featuring Tinie Tempah & Professor Green)	2015	—	—	—	—	—	—	—	—		Non-album single
"Turn the Music Louder (Rumble)" (KDA featuring Tinie Tempah & Katy B)	2015	1	—	—	—	—	55	—	—	BPI: Platinum	Honey and Youth
"Forever" (Sigma featuring Quavo, Tinie Tempah, Yxng Bane & Sebastian Kole)	2017	—	—	—	—	—	—	—	—		Non-album single
"Bancomat" (Sfera Ebbasta featuring Tinie Tempah)	2018	—	—	—	—	—	—	—	—		Rockstar
"More Life" (Torren Foot featuring Tinie Tempah and L Devine)	2020	— (Note: "More Life" did not enter the UK Singles Chart Top 100, but peaked at number 88 on the UK Singles Downloads Chart, and at number 95 on the UK Singles Sales Chart.)	—	—	—	—	—	—	—		Non-album single
"—" denotes a single that did not chart or was not released in that territory.

=== Promotional singles ===
Title	Year	Peak chart positions	Album
Title	Year	UK	Album
"Simply Unstoppable (Yes Remix)" (featuring Travis Barker)	2011	33	Non-album single
"Hanging On" (Ellie Goulding featuring Tinie Tempah)	2012	144	Halcyon
"Don't Sell Out" (featuring Candice Pillay)	2013	70	Demonstration
"5 Minutes"	2014	—	Demonstration
"Tears Run Dry" (featuring Sway Clark II)	2014	—	Demonstration
"Chasing Flies" (featuring Nea)	2017	—	Youth
"Something Special"	2017	—	Youth
"Shadows" (featuring Bipolar Sunshine)	2017	—	Youth
"Holy Moly"	2017	—	Youth
"—" denotes a single that did not chart or was not released in that territory.

=== Other charted songs ===
Title	Year	Peak chart positions	Album
Title	Year	UK	Album
"Game Over" (Tinchy Stryder featuring Giggs, Devlin, Example, Professor Green, Tinie Tempah and Chipmunk)	2010	22	Third Strike
"We Bring the Stars Out"^{[a]} (featuring Labrinth and Eric Turner)	2011	40	Non-album single
"Someday (Place in the Sun)" (featuring Ella Eyre)	2013	87	Demonstration
"It's OK" (featuring Labrinth)	2013	180	Demonstration

Notes

- ^{a} - The song was released for download following a performance at the 2011 BRIT Awards and was a mash-up of singles "Written in the Stars", "Miami 2 Ibiza" and "Pass Out".

== Guest appearances ==
Title	Year	Album
"Connections" (Chipmunk featuring Tinie Tempah)	2007	What Ever the Weather Vol. 2
"Pay Attention" (Bruza, D.E.Velopment, Tinie Tempah and Triple Threat)	2007	Shock to the System
"Warning" (D.O.K featuring Bruza, Tinie Tempah, Mz Bratt, Royal, Badness, D.E.Velopment, Krucial and Triple Threat)	2007	Shock to the System
"Ride My Bike" (Bruza, Tinie Tempah, D Dark and Elrae)	2007	Shock to the System
"Round and Round" (Terror Danjah featuring Bruza, Wretch 32 and Tinie Tempah)	2007	Shock to the System
"Future's Bright" (D.O.K featuring Mz Bratt, Tinie Tempah, Youf, Elrae and Jo-Ci)	2007	Shock to the System
"Zumpi Huntah" (Terror Danjah featuring Badness, Mz Bratt, Royal, Bruza, Youf, D.E.Velopment, D Dark, Triple Threat, Tinie Tempah, Krucial, Loudmouth Melvin and 2NICE)	2007	Shock to the System
"Be Cool (Remix)" (Wretch 32 featuring Wizzy Wow, Bashy, Chipmunk, Scorcher, Sway and Tinie Tempah)	2008	Wretchrospective
"Afar" (G FrSH featuring Tinie Tempah)	2009	Legoman: Where's My Brick
"Africa" (Mdot-E featuring Tinchy Stryder and Tinie Tempah)	2009	Red Carpet
"Stylo (Labrinth SNES Remix)" (Gorillaz featuring Mos Def, Bobby Womack and Tinie Tempah)	2010	On Melancholy Hill
"Clock My Swagger (Remix)" (Smiler featuring Smart, Glam and Tinie Tempah)	2010	Clarity
"Hello Good Morning (Team UK Remix)" (Diddy - Dirty Money featuring Tinie Tempah and Tinchy Stryder)	2010	Hello Good Morning
"Bass Down Low (Tinie Tempah Remix)" (Dev featuring Tinie Tempah)	2011	The Night the Sun Came Up
"John" (Chipmunk featuring Tinie Tempah)	2011	SPAZZZ.COM
"#imballin" (G FrSH featuring Tinie Tempah)	2013	Legoman II
"Spend Some Money" (Dizzee Rascal featuring Tinie Tempah)	2013	The Fifth
"Lord Forgive Me" (Krept & Konan featuring Tinie Tempah)	2013	Young Kingz
"Slick Rick (Remix)" (J. Spades featuring Tinie Tempah)	2014	Slick Rick (Remix)
"Really Love (Digital Farm Animals Remix)" (KSI featuring Tinie Tempah, Craig David, Yxng Bane and Digital Farm Animals)	2020	Non-album remix

== Music videos ==
Title	Year	Director(s)
"Wifey"	2006	Adam Brown
"Hood Economics"	2007	Adam Brown
"Tears"	2008	Adam Brown
"Pass Out"	2009	Tim Brown
"Frisky" (featuring Labrinth)	2010	Tim Brown
"Written in the Stars" (featuring Eric Turner)	2010	Alex Herron
"Miami 2 Ibiza" (Swedish House Mafia vs. Tinie Tempah)	2010	Christian Larson
"Game Over" (Tinchy Stryder featuring Giggs, Devlin, Example, Professor Green, Tinie Tempah and Chipmunk)	2010	Adam Powell
"Invincible" (featuring Kelly Rowland)	2010	Max & Dania
"Eyes Wide Shut" (JLS featuring Tinie Tempah)	2010	Syndrome
"Wonderman" (featuring Ellie Goulding)	2011	Robert Hale
"Simply Unstoppable" (with Travis Barker)	2011	Al Sux
"Hitz" (Chase & Status featuring Tinie Tempah)	2011	AG Rojas
"Till I'm Gone" (featuring Wiz Khalifa)	2011	Dori Oskowitz
"Earthquake" (Labrinth featuring Tinie Tempah)	2011	Syndrome
"Angels & Stars" (Eric Turner featuring Lupe Fiasco and Tinie Tempah)	2012	P.R. Brown
"R.I.P." (Rita Ora featuring Tinie Tempah)	2012	Emil Nava
"Drinking from the Bottle" (Calvin Harris featuring Tinie Tempah)	2013	AG Rojas
"Trampoline" (featuring 2 Chainz)	2013	Dawn Shadforth
"Children of the Sun" (featuring John Martin)	2013	Jon Augustavo
"Lover Not a Fighter" (featuring Labrinth)	2014	Emil Nava
"5 Minutes"	2014	Si&Ad
"Tears Run Dry"	2014	Rankin
"Not Letting Go" (featuring Jess Glynne)	2015	Charlie Robins
"We Don't Play No Games" (featuring MoStack and Sneakbo)	2015	VERTEX
"Girls Like" (featuring Zara Larsson)	2016	Craig Moore
"Mamacita" (featuring Wizkid)	2016	Craig Moore
"Something Special"	2017	Veryrare
"Chasing Flies" (featuring Nea)	2017	Emil Nava
"Text from Your Ex" (featuring Tinashe)	2017	Craig Moore
"Shadows" (featuring Bipolar Sunshine)	2017	Oliver Jennings
"Find Me" (featuring Jake Bugg)	2017	Frost
