= Frisky =

Frisky may refer to:

- Frisky (automobile) a family of British microcars produced 1957–1964
- Frisky Tom, a 1981 arcade game
- Mister Frisky, a racehorse
- ST Frisky, a tugboat, previously the Empire Rita
- "Frisky" (Sly and the Family Stone song)
- "Frisky" (Tinie Tempah song)
- Frisky (film), US title for the 1954 Italian film Bread, Love and Jealousy
- Frisky, a 2015 comedy film
- The Frisky (website), a Women's Entertainment & Lifestyle website
- Frisky, the godmother of Bluey in Bluey

== See also ==
- Friskies, a brand of cat food
- Frisky & Mannish, a musical comedy cabaret double act based in London
