= Invincible (Tinie Tempah song) =

2010 single by Tinie Tempah

Single by Tinie Tempah featuring Kelly Rowland

from the album Disc-Overy
- Released: 27 December 2010
- Recorded: 2010
- Length: 3:21
- Label: Parlophone
- Songwriters: Eshraque Mughal; Patrick Okogwu; Phillipe-Marc Anquetil
- Producer: iSHi

Tinie Tempah singles chronology
"Game Over" (2010)	"Invincible" (2010)	"Eyes Wide Shut" (2011)

Kelly Rowland singles chronology
"Forever and a Day" (2010)	"Invincible" (2010)	"Gone" (2011)

Music video
- "Invincible" on YouTube

"Invincible" is a song by English rapper Tinie Tempah. Written by Tempah, co-written and produced by iSHi, the song features guest vocals from American recording artist, Kelly Rowland. It was released on 26 December 2010, serving as the fourth official single from Tempah's debut album, Disc-Overy. The song was conceived by Tempah as a tribute to the music which Rowland used to release when she was part of Destiny's Child. Critics noted the song's production, which consists of brassy horns and a piano riff similar to David Guetta and Rowland's hit single "When Love Takes Over" (2009). An accompanying music video sees Tempah travelling through London reminiscing about his humble beginnings. Rowland appears as a projected image on the buildings.

== Composition ==
"Invincible" was written by Eshraque "iSHi" Mughal, Phillipe-Marc Anquetil & Tinie Tempah, and produced by iSHi. It features American recording artist Kelly Rowland. Jon O'Brien from Allmusic noted that the song's "huge piano riffs" were similar to those on "When Love Takes Over", a collaboration between Rowland and David Guetta. Robert Copsey of Digital Spy describes the composition as "a suitably bump n' grind-able beat & brassy horns." Tempah revealed that the track was a tribute to Rowland's time in Destiny's Child, "music he grew up listening to". Rowland commented on working with Tinie: "I just love Tinie. What I really like is that he's himself and not trying to be anyone else – people respect that."

== Critical reception ==
"Invincible" received mixed reviews from critics. Ailbhe Malone from NME said "Invincible" was one of two low points on the album. Malone said "it only features Kelly Rowland warbling happily while Tinie takes care of the rest. The astonishing thing is that on any other record, this low point would have been a stand-out track. With Tinie, only the best will do." Josh Holliday from Virgin Media was also not impressed with the song saying that "whilst the Kelly Rowland collab 'Invincible', comes across as a schmaltz-sodden 'Empire State of Mind' take, were Jay-Z and Alicia Keys gazing longingly into one another's pupils, serenading spurned love between the two hip hop behemoths instead of an ode addressing the very city whose sky is diurnally pierced by the very skyscraper that embellishes the Disc-Overy artwork."

Robert Copsey from Digital Spy gave the song a mixed review saying "in truth we're inclined to side with his label on this one. Lyrics about the 'highest mountains' and 'driest deserts' backed by a lighter-than-air trance riff might be reminiscent of the girls in album track mode back in 2001, but after his forward-looking recent d'n'b-cum-electropop efforts, we'll take the 2010 Tinie any day." However Alex Petridis from The Guardian said Rowland's vocal performance made it seem as if she was "busting a gut". Fraser McAlpine from BBC Chart Blog said "[Invincible is] a song in which Tinie takes the time to consider where he has come from and what he has achieved, through the lens of a relationship, so that Kelly has something to sing about. It is this lens which separates this song from a LOT of other hip hop songs. And to be fair, he really has come a long way in a very short time, so it's probably fair comment. His aunt's house must be FULL of clothes by now".

== Chart performance ==
"Invincible" made its UK Singles Chart debut at number fifty-seven on 16 October 2010, the same week that Tempah's album, Disc-Overy hit debuted at number one on the UK Albums Chart. Rowland's own single "Forever and a Day" also made its chart debut that same week, opening at number forty-nine. "Invincible" was one of five songs from Tempah to chart during his album's release week, the others being "Written in the Stars" (number three), "Pass Out" (number forty-three), "Wonderman" (number forty-five) and "Frisky" (number fifty). The single also made its R&B Singles Chart debut at number twenty. "Invincible" would only remain in the Singles chart for another week before dropping out. However upon confirmation of its release as a single, "Invincible" returned to the singles chart at number sixty-four. It has since peaked at number eleven on the UK Singles Chart and number four on the UK R&B Chart. To date it is Tempah's lowest charting UK single, missing out on a top-three chart position as his previous three singles from Disc-Overy achieved. It also peaked at number eighteen in Ireland, making it Tempah's lowest charting single in Ireland. In contrast, it is Rowland's highest-charting single since June 2010 when she reached number nine with "Commander", and beat Rowland's previous single "Forever and a Day" which only managed to reach number forty-nine. The single also became Rowland's sixth best selling solo single in the UK with 200,000 copies being sold as of November 2011.

== Music video ==
The music video was directed by Max & Dania and premiered on Kiss TV on 7 December 2010 at 1 pm. It was then uploaded to YouTube the same day, but the video date shows 6 December. It shows Tinie Tempah rapping in a sequined suit. Scenes of him performing at St. Paul's Academy where he studied, with Reggie Yates on BBC Radio 1 when "Pass Out" went to number 1, clips from "Frisky" and "Written in the Stars" and other memories are all shown – which some are shown playing on the side of buildings. Kelly Rowland is in a science lab coat and a pretty red glittery dress and is also seen on the side of buildings too.

== Formats ==
- Digital download / CD Single
1. "Invincible" – 3:21
2. "Invincible" (Acoustic) – 3:21
3. "Invincible" (Instrumental) – 3:20

== Charts ==
=== Weekly charts ===
Chart (2010–11)	Peak position
Australia (ARIA)	38
Australia (ARIA Urban Singles)	14
Austria (Ö3 Austria Top 40)	62
CIS Airplay (TopHit)	197
Germany (GfK)	39
Ireland (IRMA)	13
Italy (FIMI)	33
Netherlands (Urban Top 100)	16
New Zealand (Recorded Music NZ)	5
Scotland Singles (OCC)	10
Switzerland (Schweizer Hitparade)	33
UK Singles (OCC)	11
UK Hip Hop/R&B (OCC)	4

=== Year-end charts ===
Chart (2011)	Position
UK Singles Chart	166

== Certifications ==
Region	Certification	Certified units/sales
New Zealand (RMNZ)	Gold	7,500^{*}
United Kingdom (BPI)	Silver	256,000
^{*} Sales figures based on certification alone.

== Release history ==
Region	Date	Format	Label
Ireland	27 December 2010	Digital download	Parlophone
United Kingdom	27 December 2010	Digital download	Parlophone
Germany	11 February 2011	CD single	Parlophone
