= Wonderman (Tinie Tempah song) =

2011 single by Tinie Tempah

Single by Tinie Tempah featuring Ellie Goulding

from the album Disc-Overy
- B-side: "Simply Unstoppable"
- Released: 7 March 2011
- Recorded: 2009–2010
- Genre: Electro; grime; folktronica
- Length: 3:41
- Label: Parlophone
- Songwriters: Labrinth; Tinie Tempah; Marc Williams
- Producer: Labrinth

Tinie Tempah singles chronology
"Eyes Wide Shut" (2011)	"Wonderman" (2011)	"Simply Unstoppable" (2011)

Ellie Goulding singles chronology
"Your Song" (2010)	"Wonderman" (2011)	"Lights" (2011)

Audio sample
- "Wonderman": file; help

Music video
- "Wonderman" on YouTube

"Wonderman" is a song by the English rapper Tinie Tempah featuring the English singer Ellie Goulding. It was released on 7 March 2011 as the fifth single from Tinie Tempah's debut studio album, Disc-Overy (2010). The song was produced by long-time collaborator Labrinth. who has also worked with Tinie Tempah on "Pass Out" and "Frisky", and mixed by James F Reynolds, who mixed the entire Disc-Overy album. The single peaked at number 12 on the UK Singles Chart.

== Background ==
Ellie Goulding provides guest vocals on this track, which lays Tempah's rap over a dreamy electropop beat. She told the BBC programme Newsbeat: "He's one of these people I believe in, and not just because of his music, but because he's a lovely person. [The track is] about not having all that much when you're little and then working very hard and then having a lot more than you used to have and being very grateful. So I can relate to it – it's really cool." Tempah told The Sun how he met Goulding: "We met properly earlier this year at the Dingwalls venue in Camden, North London, when we were on the same bill and just hit it off. She's just a really cool chick. She's come to watch a few of my shows and vice versa. We continued to stay in touch. The media kept saying. 'When are you guys going to work together?' So I was like 'You know what? Let's do it for the album.'" Labrinth also provided backing vocals although he was uncredited.

== Critical reception ==
Nick Levine of Digital Spy gave the song a positive review, giving it four out of five stars and stating: "A typically savvy Labrinth production, 'Wonderman' blends elements of rap, rock, electronica and dance into a parcel as glossily tempting as all the best pop – and then ribbons it with the inimitable quivery vocals of Ellie Goulding, sounding suitably celestial as she sings about "the chosen one" calling his name. And Tinie himself? Well, to his credit, he's still eking juice out of this well-squeezed theme – or maybe we're just suckers for a rapper who namechecks Kestral Lager and Benidorm in a song whose subject matter touches on the fatalistic, the supernatural and the biblical?"

== Live performances ==
Tempah and Goulding performed the track for the first time on live television at the 2011 BRIT Awards official launch ceremony in January 2011. Tempah and Goulding also performed the track at the Coachella Music and Arts Festival in April 2011. They also performed the track together at the 2011 Radio 1's Big Weekend.

== Chart performance ==
It entered the UK Singles Chart the week after Disc-Overy released on 17 October 2010 at number 45, slipping to number 66 the following week. "Wonderman" then made its first appearance in the top 40 on 30 January 2011 at number 40. The next week it climbed 26 places to number 14 before peaking at number 12. It finished as the 89th biggest selling single of 2011 in the UK, selling approximately 256,000 units that year.

== Music video ==
The music video was directed by Robert Hale. A press release stated that the music video is a "fun-filled homage to seventies classic The Six Million Dollar Man, with Tinie starring as 'The Wonderman' aided by his assistant, Ellie Goulding in their mission to save the world." The full official video was released on 19 January 2011 by Tempah's Vevo on YouTube. The video ends with the text "TO BE CONTINUED" with Tempah as the background.

== Track listing ==
Digital download
No.	Title	Length
1.	"Wonderman" (featuring Ellie Goulding)	3:41
2.	"Wonderman" (instrumental edit)	3:36
3.	"Wonderman" (Bare Noize remix)	4:14
4.	"Wonderman" (Jacob Plant remix)	4:47
5.	"Wonderman" (All About She remix)	3:46
6.	"Wonderman" (Dirty Duvall remix)	4:17

CD single
No.	Title	Length
1.	"Wonderman"	3:41
2.	"Wonderman" (instrumental edit)	3:36

Record Store Day 7" vinyl
No.	Title	Length
1.	"Wonderman"	3:41
2.	"Simply Unstoppable" (edit)	3:05

== Charts ==
=== Weekly charts ===
Chart (2011)	Peak position
Ireland (IRMA)	16
Scottish Singles Sales (Official Charts)	15
Slovakia Airplay (ČNS IFPI)	62
UK Singles (Official Charts)	12
UK Hip Hop/R&B (Official Charts)	3

=== Year-end charts ===
Chart (2011)	position
UK Singles (OCC)	89

== Certifications ==
Region	Certification	Certified units/sales
United Kingdom (BPI)	Gold	400,000^{‡}
^{‡} Sales+streaming figures based on certification alone.
