= All About She =

English electronic band

- Origin: London, England
- Genres: UK garage; house; drum and bass; R&B; electronic
- Years active: 2010–present
- Labels: Disturbing London; Atlantic
- Members: James Tadgell; Jon Clare; Vanya Taylor

All About She are an English band from High Wycombe, England. The band consists of record producers James Tadgell and Jon Clare, and singer Vanya Taylor. They were signed to Tinie Tempah's record label Disturbing London and have worked several times with him as well as other artists on the label. Tadgell and Clare, who have both previously worked with Devlin and Scorcher, wrote and produced "Intro", which opens Tinie Tempah's debut album Disc-Overy. Vanya provided vocals for Tinie's hit single "Simply Unstoppable" and Roska's song "Desire". Taylor has also performed backing vocals for Jessie J, and All About She created a remix of her single "It's My Party" for the deluxe edition of her second album, Alive. They also collaborated with Calvin Harris on the song "Love Now" from his fourth album, Motion (2014).

== Music career ==
=== 2013–present: Breakthrough ===
Their debut single "Bullet", featuring vocals from V V Brown, was released on 29 April 2013. The group's second single "Higher (Free)" was released on 29 November 2013, and entered the UK Singles Chart at number twenty and the UK Dance Chart at number five for the week ending 14 December 2013. They released a free six-track extended play titled Go Slow on 1 May 2014.

Since disbanding, group members James Tadgall & Jon Clare have rebranded as a duo & are now known as Yola Recoba.

== Discography ==
=== Extended plays ===
Title	Album details
Go Slow	Released: 1 May 2014; Label: Self-released; Format: Free digital download

=== Singles ===
==== As lead artist ====
Single	Year	Peak chart positions		Album
Single	Year	UK	UK Dance	Album
"Bullet" (featuring V V Brown)	2013	—	—	—N/a
"Higher (Free)"	2013	20	5	—N/a
"—" denotes single that did not chart or was not released.

==== As featured artist ====
Single	Year	Peak chart positions		Album
Single	Year	UK	UK Dance	Album
"Love Now" (Calvin Harris featuring All About She)	2014	—	—	Motion
"Fopspeen (Bound 2 U)" (Hush featuring All About She)	2016	—	—	Vonk EP
"—" denotes single that did not chart or was not released.

=== Remixes ===
Year	Song	Artist
2011	"Wonderman"	Tinie Tempah featuring Ellie Goulding
2013	"It's My Party" (All About She UKG Mix) (featuring MC Neat)	Jessie J
2013	"It's My Party" (All About She Night Mix)	Jessie J
2013	"Broken"	Daley
2014	"Rather Be"	Clean Bandit
2014	"Lover Not a Fighter"	Tinie Tempah featuring Labrinth
2014	"Tsunami (Jump)"	DVBBS and Borgeous featuring Tinie Tempah
2014	"Marilyn"	Alexa Goddard
2014	"So High"	Rascals
2014	"Living Without You"	Sasha Keable
2014	"Sing That Song"	TIEKS
2015	"Emotions" (Bootleg)	Mariah Carey
2015	"We Run the Block"	Bonkaz
2015	"Not Letting Go"	Tinie Tempah featuring Jess Glynne
2015	"Bury It There"	Kimberly Anne
2015	"Ride"	Lowell feat. Icona Pop

=== Production credits ===
Year	Title	Artist	Album
2010	"Intro"	Tinie Tempah	Disc-Overy
2013	"Daydreamer"	Sasha Keable	Black Book
2013	"Careless Over You"	Sasha Keable	Black Book
2013	"You Got Me"	Sasha Keable	Black Book
2013	"Lights"	Sasha Keable	Black Book
2014	"Love Now"	Calvin Harris (co-production)	Motion
2016	"Fopspeen (Bound 2 U)"	Hush	Fopspeen (Bound 2 U) - Single Vonk EP
