= Till I'm Gone =

2011 single by Tinie Tempah

Single by Tinie Tempah featuring Wiz Khalifa

from the album Disc-Overy
- Released: 17 May 2011
- Recorded: 2011
- Genre: Hip hop
- Length: 3:30 (album version); 3:45 (radio edit)
- Label: Parlophone
- Songwriters: Patrick Okogwu; Cameron Jibril Thomaz
- Producer: Stargate

Tinie Tempah singles chronology
"Hitz" (2011)	"Till I'm Gone" (2011)	"Love Suicide" (2011)

Wiz Khalifa singles chronology
"Bright Lights Bigger City" (2011)	"Till I'm Gone" (2011)	"Oh My" (2011)

"Till I'm Gone" is a song by British rapper Tinie Tempah featuring American rapper Wiz Khalifa. The song was produced by Norwegian production team Stargate. The single became the seventh overall single from Tempah's debut album Disc-Overy, becoming the second single in the United States following Written in the Stars, and the first single from the deluxe edition of the album in the United Kingdom. The single was released in the United States on 17 May 2011, before being released in the United Kingdom on 7 August 2011. The song was later used as the theme for two episodes of AMC's Breaking Bad.

== Background ==
In an interview with American magazine Rolling Stone, Tempah talked about Wiz Khalifa's contribution to the song: "I feel like we're in the same kind of situation, but in reverse. He's really huge out here now and I have a lot of presence in the Europe and U.K., and vice versa, so if there was ever a time to collaborate, now would be the time." Tempah performed the song live at The Box in New York City on 23 May 2011. He also performed the song on the Late Show with David Letterman in the same week. The video for the song was released on YouTube on 30 June 2011 and serves both the British and American markets.

== Music video ==
A teaser of the music video was released to Tinie Tempah's VEVO Channel on 24 June 2011. The official music video was released on the same channel shortly afterwards on 28 June 2011. Both Tempah and Khalifa appeared in the video, which features the pair in various locations across the globe including New York City, Amsterdam, Sydney, Tokyo and Singapore and dimensions of Los Angeles. The video was filmed in the Hollywood Hills Area and Downtown Los Angeles.

== Remixes ==
Dutch record producer Don Diablo released an official remix of the song in the United States, and later for free download worldwide. An official remix of the song, which was produced by Drumma Boy, was released on 29 August 2011 and it features Wiz Khalifa, Pusha T and Jim Jones. The remix was part of Tempah's Happy Birthday mixtape.

== Track listing ==
Digital download
No.	Title	Length
1.	"Till I'm Gone"	3:30

CD single
No.	Title	Length
1.	"Till I'm Gone" (radio edit)	3:45
2.	"Till I'm Gone"	3:30
3.	"Till I'm Gone" (instrumental edit)	3:30

== Charts ==
Chart (2011)	Peak position
Ireland (IRMA)	32
Scotland Singles (OCC)	29
Switzerland (Schweizer Hitparade)	69
UK Hip Hop/R&B (OCC)	6
UK Singles (OCC)	24
US Billboard Hot 100	90
US Hot R&B/Hip-Hop Songs (Billboard)	49
US Mainstream Top 40 (Billboard)	37
US Rap Songs (Billboard)	22
US Rhythmic (Billboard)	22

== Certifications ==
Region	Certification	Certified units/sales
United Kingdom (BPI)	Silver	200,000^{‡}
^{‡} Sales+streaming figures based on certification alone.

== Release history ==
Region	Date	Format	Label
United States	17 May 2011	Digital download	Capitol Records
United States	21 June 2011	Rhythmic airplay	Capitol Records
United States	12 July 2011	Mainstream airplay	Capitol Records
United Kingdom	7 August 2011	Digital download	Parlophone
