= Time for Livin' =

Time for Livin' may refer to:

- "Time for Livin'" (Sly and the Family Stone song), 1974
- "Time for Livin'", a 1968 song by the Association from Birthday
