= Loose Booty =

Loose Booty may refer to:

- "Loose Booty" (Sly and the Family Stone song)
- "Loose Booty", a song by Funkadelic from the 1972 album America Eats Its Young
- "Loose Booty", a song by Faster Pussycat from the 1992 album Whipped!
