= Until One =

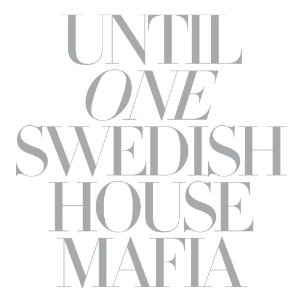

Compilation album by Swedish House Mafia
- Released: 25 October 2010
- Recorded: 2009–2010
- Genres: Electro house; progressive house; house
- Length: 79:26
- Labels: Virgin; EMI; Astralwerks
- Producers: Axwell; Steve Angello; Sebastian Ingrosso; Sander van Doorn; The Source; Laidback Luke; An21; TV Rock; Justice; Prok & Fitch; Daddy's Groove; Empire of the Sun; Donnie Sloan; Peter Mayes; Benny Benassi; Hal Ritson; Dirty South; Ken Nelson; Coldplay; David Guetta; Fred Rister; Max Vangeli; Louie Vega; Jay "Sinister" Sealee; Adrian Lux; Henrik B; Miike Snow; Daft Punk

Swedish House Mafia chronology
Until One (2010)	Until Now (2012)

Singles from Until One
- 1. "One" Released: 22 March 2010; 2. "Miami 2 Ibiza" Released: 1 October 2010

Until One is the debut compilation album by Swedish house music supergroup Swedish House Mafia. It was released on 22 October 2010.

== Critical reception ==
Professional ratings
Aggregate scores
Source	Rating
Metacritic	53/100
Review scores
Source	Rating
AllMusic	3/5 stars
Clash	1/10
Filter	73%
The Guardian	2/5 stars
Metro	2/5 stars
Spin	5/10
[V] Music	3/5 stars

On its release, Until One received generally mixed reviews from most music critics. At Metacritic, which assigns a normalised rating out of 100 to reviews from mainstream critics, the album received an average score of 54, based on 6 reviews, which indicates "mixed or average reviews".

== Singles ==
- "One" was the first single to be released from the album and was released in the UK on 6 September 2010, debuting at number 7. The single version, "One (Your Name)", featured vocals from Pharrell Williams of N.E.R.D.
- "Miami 2 Ibiza" was the second single to be released from the album and featured vocals from Tinie Tempah. First released on 1 October 2010, the single peaked at number 4 on the UK Singles Chart.

== Track listing ==
No.	Title	Artist	Length
1.	"Miami 2 Ibiza"	Swedish House Mafia vs. Tinie Tempah	3:24
2.	"Miami 2 Ibiza" (instrumental)	Swedish House Mafia	2:16
3.	"Reach Out"/"You Got the Love"	Sander van Doorn / The Source featuring Candi Staton	1:59
4.	"Leave the World Behind"	Axwell, Steve Angello, Sebastian Ingrosso & Laidback Luke featuring Deborah Cox	3:11
5.	"Nothing But Love" (Remode)	Axwell	3:05
6.	"Valodja"	Steve Angello & AN21	2:46
7.	"In the Air" (Axwell Remix)	TV Rock feat. Rudy	2:59
8.	"Kidsos"/"We Are Your Friends"	Sebastian Ingrosso / Justice vs. Simian	3:59
9.	"Walk with Me" (Axwell & Daddy's Groove Remix)	Prok & Fitch pres. Nanchang Nancy	2:29
10.	"Tivoli"/"Walking on a Dream"	Steve Angello / Empire of the Sun	4:01
11.	"Satisfaction" (Isak Original Extended Mix)	Benny Benassi pres. The Biz	2:20
12.	"Show Me Love"	Steve Angello & Laidback Luke featuring Robin S	4:21
13.	"KNAS"	Steve Angello	3:14
14.	"Meich"/"Clocks"	Sebastian Ingrosso & Dirty South / Coldplay	3:55
15.	"How Soon Is Now" (Extended)	David Guetta, Sebastian Ingrosso & Dirty South featuring Julie McKnight	6:01
16.	"Swedish Beauty"/"Diamond Life"	AN21 & Max Vangelli / Louie Vega & Jay "Sinister" Sealee featuring Julie McKnight	5:32
17.	"Tell Me Why"	Supermode	2:51
18.	"Teenage Crime" (Axwell & Henrik B Remode)	Adrian Lux	2:44
19.	"Monday"	Steve Angello	3:00
20.	"Silvia" (Sebastian Ingrosso & Dirty South Remix)	Miike Snow	2:59
21.	"I Found U" (Remode)	Axwell	3:43
22.	"One More Time"	Daft Punk	3:22
23.	"One"	Swedish House Mafia	3:23
24.	"One (Your Name)"	Swedish House Mafia featuring Pharrell	3:03

Take One DVD
No.	Title	Length
1.	"Documentary Film"	44:00
2.	"One (Your Name) - Music Video"	3:19
3.	"In The Studio With Pharrell"	1:44
4.	"Axwell And The Coffee"	0:45
5.	"Sebastiam's Tour Trailer"	1:26
6.	"Steve's Ferrari"	0:52

Vinyl 10"
No.	Title	Length
1.	"One (Original Mix)"	5:49
2.	"Miami 2 Ibiza (Instrumental)"	6:45

== Charts ==
Chart performance for Until One
Chart (2010)	Peak position
Belgian Albums (Ultratop Flanders)	6
Belgian Albums (Ultratop Wallonia)	22
Danish Albums (Hitlisten)	31
Dutch Albums (Album Top 100)	8
French Albums (SNEP)	66
Italian Albums (FIMI)	81
Swedish Albums (Sverigetopplistan)	13
Swiss Albums (Schweizer Hitparade)	18
UK Compilation Albums (Official Charts)	2
UK Dance Albums (Official Charts)	1
US Billboard 200	139
US Top Dance Albums (Billboard)	4

== Certifications ==
Certifications for Until One
Region	Certification	Certified units/sales
Sweden (GLF)	Platinum	40,000^{‡}
United Kingdom (BPI)	Gold	100,000^{^}
^{^} Shipments figures based on certification alone.^{‡} Sales+streaming figures based on certification alone.

== Release history ==
Release history and formats for Until One
Region	Date	Format	Label	Catalogue
Germany	22 October 2010	CD	Polydor	B003UYJGZI
United Kingdom	25 October 2010	Digital download	Polydor	B003UYJGZI
United Kingdom	25 October 2010	CD	Polydor	B003UYJGZI
