= Love Suicide =

Song by Tinie Tempah featuring Ester Dean

from the album Disc-Overy
- Released: 1 October 2010
- Length: 4:07
- Label: Parlophone
- Songwriter(s): Patrick Okogwu; Espen Lind; Tor Erik Hermansen; Mikkel S. Eriksen; Amund Bjørklund; Chris Brown; Ester Dean
- Producer(s): Stargate

"Love Suicide" is a song by British rapper Tinie Tempah, featuring vocals from singer-songwriter Ester Dean. The song was produced by Norwegian production team Stargate. In some areas of Europe, the track was used as the official theme for the KS Media adverts, a television production company who used the track for certain advertisements.

== Track listing ==
- Digital download
1. "Love Suicide" – 4:07

== Chart performance ==
Chart (2011)	Peak position
Czech Republic (IFPI)	15
Netherlands (GFK)	20
Slovakia (IFPI)	12

== Release history ==
Region	Date	Format	Label
Various	10 October 2010	Digital download	Disturbing London; Parlophone
