= Small Talk (Sly and the Family Stone album) =

Studio album by Sly and the Family Stone
- Released: July 1974
- Recorded: 1974
- Studios: The Record Plant, Los Angeles
- Genres: Funk, soul
- Length: 37:27
- Label: Epic (PE 32930)
- Producer: Sly Stone

Sly and the Family Stone chronology
Fresh (1973)	Small Talk (1974)	High on You (1975)

Small Talk is the seventh album by Sly and the Family Stone, released by Epic and CBS Records in 1974. This album was the final LP to feature the original Family Stone, which broke up in January 1975.

The album's singles were "Time for Livin'" (the band's final Top 40 hit) and "Loose Booty". Pictured on the album cover with bandleader Sly Stone in a photograph by Norman Seeff are his then-wife Kathleen Silva and his son Sylvester Jr.

In addition to its standard stereo release, Small Talk was also released in quadraphonic sound.

== Music and lyrics ==
The album is more mellow and restful than earlier efforts, critic Alex Stimmel observes. Prominence of strings distinguishes the album from earlier recordings by the band, and violin player Sid Page is credited as a band member. According to critic Alex Stimmel, the string section is used to "cushion the mood, augment vocal lines, create melodies, or sting riffs once reserved for horns." Stimmel writes that this aspect of the music shows Sly Stone as "the producer-genius that he was." Other than that, the album has a spare sound in comparison to the band's earlier records. More than half the tracks include studio chatter, which according to Stimmel makes for "an air of spontaneity from the sessions, as if the tape was just rolling and the band was finally having a good time again." In addition to the single releases, other hard funk counterpoints to the mellow tunes are "Can't Strain My Brain" and "Better Thee Than Me".

Some lyrics reflect familial love, Stone having been recently married, yet the message music characteristic of the band's '60s hits returns for the last time in the "raucous, vengeful 'Time for Livin".

== Artwork ==
The cover of the album showed a picture of Stone, his wife Kathleen Silva, and baby Sly Jr. On 5 June 1974, the pair were married onstage at Madison Square Garden; the marriage lasted five months.

== Critical reception ==
Retrospective professional reviews
Review scores
Source	Rating
AllMusic	3/5 stars
Austin Chronicle	2/5 stars
Christgau's Record Guide	C
The Guardian	2/5 stars
Rolling Stone	3/5 stars
Uncut	2/5 stars

Reviewing the original LP for Let It Rock in 1974, Pete Wingfield said Small Talk follows mostly in the vein of the band's previous album, Fresh (1973) – "a little mellower, happier, more together maybe. Certainly more so than on Riot – the sniffing self-pity of that period has mercifully gone; a couple of cuts even approach the 'up' feel of [Stone's] early hits."

Less impressed was Village Voice critic Robert Christgau, who said, "Although you can hear different, you'd almost think Sly's sense of rhythm had abandoned him, because his first flop is a bellywhopper—its scant interest verbal, its only memorable song a doowop takeoff." Years later in Rolling Stone, he rated the CD reissue somewhat higher, but wrote that the album marked for Stone "the beginning of an end that proceeded through many false comebacks to yesterday, today and tomorrow."

In Canada, the album reached #13 on the weekly charts and #100 on the year-end chart.

== Track listing ==
All tracks written by Sylvester "Sly Stone" Stewart, except for "Small Talk", written by Sylvester Stewart and W. Silva. All songs produced and arranged by Sly Stone for Fresh Productions.

=== Side one ===
1. "Small Talk" – 3:22
2. "Say You Will" – 3:19
3. "Mother Beautiful" – 2:01
4. "Time for Livin'" – 3:17
5. "Can't Strain My Brain" – 4:09

=== Side two ===
1. "Loose Booty" – 3:47
2. "Holdin' On" – 3:39
3. "Wishful Thinkin'" – 4:26
4. "Better Thee Than Me" – 3:35
5. "Livin' While I'm Livin'" – 2:58
6. "This is Love" – 2:54

=== CD bonus tracks ===
Added for 2007 limited edition compact disc reissue:

- "Crossword Puzzle" (early version) - 3:47
- "Time for Livin'" (alternate take) - 4:00
- "Loose Booty" (alternate take) - 2:05
- "Positive" (previously unreleased instrumental) - 2:15

== Personnel ==
=== Sly and the Family Stone ===
- Sly Stone – vocals, organ, guitar, piano, harmonica, and more
- Freddie Stone – backing vocals, guitar
- Rose Stone – backing vocals, piano, keyboards
- Cynthia Robinson – trumpet
- Jerry Martini – saxophone
- Pat Rizzo – saxophone
- Sid Page – violin
- Rusty Allen – bass guitar
- Andy Newmark, Bill Lordan – drums
- Little Sister (Vet Stone, Mary McCreary, Elva Mouton) – backing vocals

=== Additional personnel ===
- Karat Faye – engineer
- Ed Bogas – string arranger
- Norman Seeff – cover photography
- John Berg, John Van Hamersveld – design
- Truman Thomas A/K/A True Gubmint – assistance on keyboards

== Charts ==
=== Weekly charts ===
Chart (1974)	Peak positions
U.S. Billboard Pop Albums	15
Canadian RPM Albums Chart	13
