= Simply Unstoppable =

Single by Tinie Tempah featuring Travis Barker and Katie Taylor

from the album Disc-Overy
- Released: 20 April 2011
- Recorded: 2011
- Genre: Hip hop; rap rock
- Length: 3:57 (YES remix); 3:33 (album version)
- Label: Parlophone
- Songwriters: Patrick Okogwu; Alexander Shuckburgh; Vanya Taylor
- Producers: Al Shux; Diplo; Travis Barker

Tinie Tempah singles chronology
| "Wonderman" (2011) | "Simply Unstoppable" (2011) | "Hitz" (2011) |

"Simply Unstoppable" is a song by British rapper Tinie Tempah, taken from his debut studio album, Disc-Overy. The song features uncredited vocals from British singer Vanya Taylor. On 20 April 2011 the track was released as a promotional single in the form of the YES remix, a remix featuring American drummer Travis Barker and Irish sportswoman Katie Taylor, exclusively for use in a Lucozade advertising campaign.

== Background ==
The Lucozade advert itself features Tempah, drummer Travis Barker and Irish boxer/footballer Katie Taylor, credited separately and later together as "The Wild Ones". An exclusive preview was posted on Lucozade's official Facebook page on 30 March 2011 and then aired on 12 April 2011. The advert was uploaded to YouTube on 7 April 2011 and has 1,095,000 views as of 18 August 2011. "Basically they approached me and explained to me the concept of the whole advert and video. I’ve been a big fan of the Lucozade adverts from when I was young, I’ve always found them really iconic and eye grabbing. I was up for it and then I heard Travis Barker and Katie were doing it and it doesn’t get any better than that. It was a privilege to work with Travis and from the energy in the room I knew the track and ad were going to be a bit special." said Tinie in an interview on how the advert came together and working with Travis Barker. On the advert and collaboration, Travis Barker said: "When they came to me with the idea of a collaboration and remix, I thought it would be cool to be part of it." Fans requested for the remix to be released as a single. Tempah said: "We're flattered that fans have asked for the track to be made available and they can now get their hands on the YES remix."

== Track listing ==
- Digital download
1. "Simply Unstoppable" (YES Remix) – 3:57
- Promotional CD single
1. "Simply Unstoppable" (YES Remix) – 3:57
2. "Simply Unstoppable" (Original Album Version) – 3:35
3. "Simply Unstoppable" (YES Instrumental) – 3:57

== Chart performance ==
| Chart (2011) | Peak position |
|---|---|
| UK Hip Hop/R&B (OCC) | 13 |
| UK Singles (OCC) | 33 |
