= Higher (Free) =

Single by All About She
- Released: 2 December 2013
- Genre: UK garage
- Length: 4:02
- Label: Disturbing London
- Songwriter(s): James Tadgell; Alahna Dressekie; John Clare; Vanya Taylor
- Producer(s): All About She

All About She singles chronology
| "Bullet" (2013) | "Higher (Free)" (2013) |

"Higher (Free)" is a song by British band All About She. It was released on 2 December 2013. The song entered the UK Singles Chart at number twenty on the week ending 14 December 2013.

== Music video ==
A music video to accompany the release of "Higher (Free)" was first released onto YouTube on 4 October 2013 at a total length of four minutes and eleven seconds. The video was directed by James Barber.

== Track listing ==
Digital download – single
| No. | Title | Length |
|---|---|---|
| 1. | "Higher (Free)" | 4:02 |

Digital download – EP
| No. | Title | Length |
|---|---|---|
| 1. | "Higher (Free)" | 4:02 |
| 2. | "Higher (Free)" (Steve Smart & Westfunk Remix) | 5:43 |
| 3. | "Higher (Free)" (Grant Nelson Remix) | 6:14 |
| 4. | "Higher (Free)" (Preditah Remix) | 3:56 |
| 5. | "Higher (Free)" (Billon Remix) | 5:45 |

== Credits and personnel ==
- Vocals – Vanya Taylor
- Lyrics – Vanya Taylor, Alahna Dressekie, James Tadgell, John Clare
- Producer – James Tadgell & John Clare
- Label – Disturbing London

== Charts ==
| Chart (2013) | Peak position |
|---|---|
| UK Dance (OCC) | 5 |
| UK Singles (OCC) | 20 |
