= Hood Economics – Room 147: The 80 Minute Course =

Mixtape by Tinie Tempah
- Released: 26 November 2007
- Recorded: 2006–07
- Genre: Grime; hip hop
- Length: 73:25
- Label: Disturbing London

Tinie Tempah chronology
Chapter 1 Verse 1–22 (2005)	Hood Economics – Room 147: The 80 Minute Course (2007)	Sexy Beast Vol. 1 (2009)

Singles from Hood Economics – Room 147: The 80 Minute Course
- 1. "Wifey" Released: 4 September 2006; 2. "Hood Economics" Released: 18 June 2007; 3. "Tears (Single Version)" Released: 19 August 2008

Hood Economics – Room 147: The 80 Minute Course is a street album released by British rapper Tinie Tempah on 26 November 2007 under his record label, Disturbing London. The album served as Tempah's first official release.

== Singles ==
"Wifey" and "Hood Economics" were released as digital only singles during 2006 and 2007, each with an accompanying music video released to Tinie's official YouTube account. "Tears" was released as the album's third and final single, and was completely reworked from its original appearance as a 1:11 skit to a full 4:15 track. The single version featured Cleo Sol and was released on a limited edition 12" vinyl, which contained remixes by Burgaboy, Tinchy Stryder and Ironik, as well as the main vocal mix.

== Track listing ==
No.	Title	Length
1.	"Intro"	1:13
2.	"When I Was Young"	3:03
3.	"Hold It Down (Remix)"	1:50
4.	"Mister (Freestyle)"	1:09
5.	"Fat Like Your Mother"	1:09
6.	"Fat Like Your Mother" (featuring Chipmunk)	0:48
7.	"Fat Like Your Mother" (featuring Mz. Bratt)	0:55
8.	"Fly Boy"	2:27
9.	"Run da Streets"	2:57
10.	"Be My Sunshine" (featuring Bashy)	2:19
11.	"Something About You" (featuring Kele Le Roc)	3:53
12.	"Tears"	1:11
13.	"Kill All a' Dem (Freestyle)"	4:32
14.	"Wifey"	3:18
15.	"Hood Economics"	3:32
16.	"Rockstar"	3:10
17.	"Postman Pat"	3:16
18.	"Love 2 Hate"	2:49
19.	"Girls"	4:16
20.	"Can't Knock 'Em Out"	3:08
21.	"Guiness (Freestyle)"	1:11
22.	"Perfect Girl" (featuring Ultra)	4:02
23.	"Barreto" (featuring Dusty Boyz)	1:31
24.	"Rock Dat"	2:57
25.	"Lil' Derek (Freestyle)"	2:09
26.	"Come Lay with Me (Remix)"	1:28
27.	"Supernova"	3:37
28.	"Let Me Know" (featuring Moni)	5:35
Total length:		73:25
