= Frisky (Sly and the Family Stone song) =

1973 single by Sly and the Family Stone

Single by Sly and the Family Stone

from the album Fresh
- Released: 1973
- Genre: Funk
- Length: 3:11
- Label: Epic
- Songwriter(s): Sylvester Stewart
- Producer(s): Sly Stone

Sly and the Family Stone singles chronology
"If You Want Me to Stay" (1972)	"Frisky" (1973)	"Time for Livin'" (1974)

"Frisky" is a song by American band Sly and the Family Stone and the second single from their sixth studio album Fresh (1973).

== Background ==
In his autobiography Thank You (Falettinme Be Mice Elf Agin), Sly Stone wrote:

"Frisky" was a picture of my room, the way I kept instruments all around the bed. A guitar, a keyboard, something to blow. An alto sax, I mean, not cocaine. I learned to play a little. I played what I could.

== Composition and critical reception ==
Stephen Davis of Rolling Stone remarked, "'Frisky' sounds like an outtake from Riot, yanked perhaps because it was just too heavy in that album's heavily doped-up context. Like much of Riot and the best of Sly, it is feeling music that is somewhat beyond the idea of dancing. The music and vocal make a graphic depiction of a certain mysterioso state of mind that not everybody can relate to. And here you got to respond to the lyrics that Sly croaks — I suggest that the song is the most graphic musical depiction of hard drug feelings since the days of Charlie Parker. The ear of the beholder, if you will." Reviewing Fresh for Shatter the Standard, Imani Raven described "Frisky" as among the album's "innovative compositions" and wrote it "offers a blend of soulful vocals and intricate organ work".

== Charts ==
Chart (1973)	Peak position
US Billboard Hot 100	79
US Hot R&B/Hip-Hop Songs (Billboard)	28
