= Disc-Overy =

Studio album by Tinie Tempah
- Released: 1 October 2010
- Recorded: 2009–10
- Genre: Hip hop; electronic; R&B
- Length: 44:45
- Label: Parlophone; Disturbing London
- Producer: Labrinth; All About She; iSHi; Al Shux; Naughty Boy; Swedish House Mafia; Emile; No I.D.; John Hill; Boi-1da; Alex da Kid; Stargate; Espionage

Tinie Tempah chronology
Disc-Overy (2010)	Demonstration (2013)

Singles from Disc-Overy
- 1. "Pass Out" Released: 28 February 2010; 2. "Frisky" Released: 7 June 2010; 3. "Written in the Stars" Released: 19 September 2010; 4. "Invincible" Released: 26 December 2010; 5. "Wonderman" Released: 7 March 2011; 6. "Till I'm Gone" Released: 17 May 2011

Professional ratings
Review scores
Source	Rating
AllMusic	4/5 stars
The A.V. Club	B−
BBC Music	mixed
Clash	8/10
Entertainment Weekly	B
The Guardian	4/5 stars
MusicOMH	2.5/5 stars
NME	8/10
Rolling Stone	3.5/5 stars
Slant Magazine	2.5/5 stars

Disc-Overy is the debut studio album by the British rapper Tinie Tempah, released in Ireland on 1 October 2010 and in the United Kingdom on 4 October, by Parlophone Records. The original album track list includes Kelly Rowland, Ellie Goulding, Labrinth, Emeli Sandé, Eric Turner, Wiz Khalifa, Swedish House Mafia and Range. Disc-Overy uses predominantly upbeat, dance-orientated production with lyrics concerning fame, youth and love. The album earned Tinie two Brit Awards in 2011 and has received Double-Platinum certification by the BPI. It also reached number one on the UK Albums Chart. In July 2011, Disc-Overy was announced as a nominee for the annual Mercury Music Prize.

Following the success of "Written in the Stars" as the album's North American lead single, it was announced that Disc-Overy would receive a United States release with a revised track list. The tracks "Obsession", "Invincible" featuring Kelly Rowland, and "Just A Little" featuring the Roc Nation artist Range were removed from the American track list, while new collaborations with Wiz Khalifa, Bei Maejor and Ester Dean were added. New production contributions came from Boi-1da, Alex da Kid and Stargate. The album was released in the United States on 17 May 2011. The three new tracks were later released in the United Kingdom on a deluxe edition of Disc-Overy, made available on 20 June 2011.

== Background ==
Discussing Disc-Overy, Tinie Tempah said, "If you've heard "Pass Out" and "Frisky" and think you know what to expect, you're wrong. I wanted this album to be really raw, not only in terms of the production but the guests. I was only interested in working with people I really respect and who I'm a fan of." He also said, "I met Ellie Goulding very early on, we swapped numbers and after that we started living very parallel worlds; the same festivals, interviews and so on. It made total sense to have her on the album."

== Chart performance ==
On its release, Disc-Overy received generally positive reviews, earning praise for its broad musical appeal and being compared with other crossover acts such as Dizzee Rascal and Tinchy Stryder. Following an anticipated release as a result of several setbacks from its original winter 2009 release date, Disc-Overy entered number the UK Album Chart at number one, selling 85,000 copies in its first week. Six singles from the album have attained UK chart success, including the number ones "Pass Out" and "Written in the Stars". Disc-Overy has received double platinum certification by British Phonographic Industry (BPI) and has sold over 750,000 copies in the UK alone since its release. It has spent fifty consecutive weeks in the UK Top 40 Albums Chart to date. In the US, the album debuted at number twenty-one on the Billboard 200 with 16,400 copies sold in the first week. In the second week, 6,300 copies were sold, making a total of 22,700 domestic units in two weeks.

== Singles ==
"Pass Out" was released as the album's first single on 28 February 2010. Produced by Labrinth, who also sang the vocal hook, the track entered the UK Singles Chart at number one, selling 92,000 copies in it first week. The track was later released on vinyl to promote the third annual Record Store Day, and a remix was recorded with Snoop Dogg for the American market, although it was later decided that the original version would be marketed in there. "Frisky" was released as the album's second single on 4 June 2010. The track features production and guest vocals by Labrinth. After a highly publicised chart battle with Dizzee Rascal and James Corden's official World Cup single "Shout", "Frisky" debuted and peaked at number two on the UK Singles Chart.

"Written in the Stars" was released as the album's third single on 27 September 2010. The track features guest vocals from the American singer and multi-instrumentalist Eric Turner, and was produced by iSHi. After first-week sales of over 115,000 copies, "Written in the Stars" entered the UK Singles Chart at number one, becoming Tinie Tempah's second number one on the chart and his third consecutive top three hit. The track was later released as Tempah's first single in the United States, reaching number twelve on the Billboard Hot 100. "Invincible" was released as the album's fourth official single on 26 December 2010. The track features guest vocals from the American singer Kelly Rowland. The track peaked at #11 on the UK Singles Chart after nine weeks in the Top 40.

"Wonderman" was released as the album's fifth official single on 7 March 2011. The track features guest vocals from the British singer-songwriter Ellie Goulding. The track peaked at number twelve on the UK Singles Chart, becoming Tempah's lowest charting single to date, one place behind its predecessor, "Invincible". "Till I'm Gone" was released as the first single from the deluxe edition of the album on 17 May 2011. It was also released as Tempah's second single in the United States. The track features guest vocals from the American rapper Wiz Khalifa. Despite not being released in the United Kingdom until August 2011, the track peaked at #24 on the UK Singles Chart.

=== Other notable charting songs ===
"Miami 2 Ibiza", was released as a single on 4 October 2010. The track is a collaboration between Tempah and the Swedish House Mafia, from the latter's album Until One (2010). The track peaked at #4 on the UK Singles Chart. "Simply Unstoppable" was released as a promotional single from the album on 20 April 2011, albeit in remixed form, in order to promote a Lucozade advertising campaign. The track peaked at #33 on the UK Singles Chart. The remix of the track features the drummer Travis Barker and the boxer Katie Taylor. "Love Suicide" also received some coverage in selected European countries, charting in Ireland at number 7, and in the Netherlands at number 20. The track features guest vocals from Ester Dean.

== Critical reception ==
On its release, Disc-Overy received generally positive reviews from music critics. At Metacritic, which assigns a normalized rating out of 100 to reviews from mainstream critics, the album received an average score of 72, based on 18 reviews, which indicates "generally favorable reviews".

== Track listing ==
No.	Title	Writer(s)	Producer(s)	Length
1.	"Intro"	Patrick Okogwu; John Clare; James Tadgell; Vanya Taylor	All About She	2:31
2.	"Simply Unstoppable"	Okogwu; Alexander Shuckburgh; Taylor	Al Shux	3:33
3.	"Pass Out"	Okogwu; Timothy McKenzie; Marc Williams	Labrinth; Da Digglar^{[a]}	4:28
4.	"Illusion"	Okogwu; Sam Frank; John Hill; Shuckburgh; Luke Steele	Al Shux; John Hill	3:16
5.	"Just a Little" (featuring Range)	Okogwu; Eshraque Mughal; Theodore Bowen	iSHi	3:03
6.	"Snap"	Okogwu; Mughal; Mark Asari; Talay Riley	iSHi	3:05
7.	"Written in the Stars" (featuring Eric Turner)	Okogwu; Mughal; Charlie Bernado; Eric Turner	iSHi	3:39
8.	"Frisky" (featuring Labrinth)	Okogwu; McKenzie; Williams	Labrinth; Da Digglar^{[a]}	4:56
9.	"Miami 2 Ibiza" (Swedish House Mafia vs. Tinie Tempah)	Okogwu; Steve Angello; Axel Hedfors; Sebastian Ingrosso	Swedish House Mafia	3:24
10.	"Obsession"	Okogwu; Emile Haynie	Emile	3:42
11.	"Invincible" (featuring Kelly Rowland)	Okogwu; Mughal; Philippe-Marc Anquetil	iSHi	3:22
12.	"Wonderman" (featuring Ellie Goulding)	Okogwu; McKenzie; Williams	Labrinth; Da Digglar^{[a]}	3:39
13.	"Let Go" (featuring Emeli Sandé)	Okogwu; Shahid Khan; Ben Harrison; Haynie; Emeli Sandé	Naughty Boy; Emile Haynie^{[b]}; Ben Harrison^{[b]}	4:17

Digital deluxe edition bonus tracks
No.	Title	Writer(s)	Producer(s)	Length
14.	"Pass Out" (Snoop Remix) (featuring Snoop Dogg)	Okogwu; McKenzie; Williams	Labrinth; Da Digglar^{[a]}; No I.D.^{[c]}	4:29
15.	"Written in the Stars" (Live at Glastonbury) (featuring Labrinth)	Okogwu; Mughal; Charlie Bernado; Eric Turner	iSHi	3:40

Digital deluxe edition bonus video EP
No.	Title	Director(s)	Length
1.	"Pass Out" (video)	Tim Brown	3:56
2.	"Frisky" (video)	Tim Brown	3:38
3.	"Written in the Stars" (video)	Alex Herron	3:36
4.	"Invincible" (video)	Colin Tilley	3:20
5.	"Wonderman" (video)	Robert Hale	3:51

Deluxe edition bonus tracks
No.	Title	Writer(s)	Producer(s)	Length
14.	"Till I'm Gone" (featuring Wiz Khalifa)	Okogwu; Mikkel S. Eriksen; Tor Erik Hermansen; Cameron Thomaz	StarGate	3:30
15.	"So Addicted" (featuring Bei Maejor)	Okogwu; Brandon Green; Matthew Samuels; Alexander Grant	Boi-1da; Alex da Kid	3:44
16.	"Love Suicide" (featuring Ester Dean)	Okogwu; Amund Bjorklund; Christopher Brown; Ester Dean; Eriksen; Hermansen; Espen Lind	StarGate; Espionage	4:08

French bonus track
No.	Title	Writer(s)	Producer(s)	Length
14.	"Pass Out" (French Version) (featuring Seth Gueko)	Okogwu; McKenzie; Williams	Labrinth; Da Digglar^{[a]}	3:45

Japanese bonus tracks
No.	Title	Writer(s)	Producer(s)	Length
14.	"Written in the Stars" (featuring Eric Turner) (Starkey Remix)	Okogwu; Mughal; Bernado; Turner	iSHi; Starkey^{[c]}
15.	"Written in the Stars" (The Arcade Southside Remix) (featuring Taio Cruz)	Okogwu; Mughal; Bernado; Turner	iSHi	3:33
16.	"Pass Out" (SBTRKT Remix)	Okogwu; McKenzie; Williams	Labrinth; Da Digglar; SBTRKT^{[c]}	4:46
17.	"Frisky" (featuring Labrinth) (Shy FX and Benny Page Digital Soundboy Remix)	Okogwu; McKenzie; Williams	Labrinth; Da Digglar^{[a]}; Shy FX^{[c]}; Benny Page^{[c]}	5:01

Disc-Overy: American version
No.	Title	Writer(s)	Producer(s)	Length
1.	"Intro"	Patrick Okogwu; John Clare; James Tadgell; Vanya Taylor	All About She	2:31
2.	"Simply Unstoppable"	Okogwu; Alexander Shuckburgh; Taylor	Al Shux	3:33
3.	"Pass Out"	Okogwu; Timothy McKenzie; Marc Williams	Labrinth; Marc Williams^{[a]}	4:28
4.	"Till I'm Gone" (featuring Wiz Khalifa)	Okogwu; Mikkel S. Eriksen; Tor Erik Hermansen; Cameron Thomaz	StarGate	3:30
5.	"Illusion"	Okogwu; Sam Frank; John Hill; Shuckburgh; Luke Steele	Al Shux; John Hill	3:16
6.	"So Addicted" (featuring Bei Maejor)	Okogwu; Brandon Green; Matthew Samuels; Alexander Grant	Boi-1da; Alex da Kid	3:44
7.	"Snap"	Okogwu; Mughal; Mark Asari; Talay Riley	iSHi	3:05
8.	"Written in the Stars" ((Radio Mix) featuring Eric Turner)	Okogwu; Mughal; Charlie Bernado; Eric Turner	iSHi	3:24
9.	"Frisky" (featuring Labrinth)	Okogwu; McKenzie; Williams	Labrinth	4:56
10.	"Miami 2 Ibiza" (Swedish House Mafia vs. Tinie Tempah)	Okogwu; Steve Angello; Axel Hedfors; Sebastian Ingrosso	Swedish House Mafia	3:24
11.	"Love Suicide" (featuring Ester Dean)	Okogwu; Amund Bjorklund; Christopher Brown; Ester Dean; Eriksen; Hermansen; Espen Lind	StarGate; Espionage	4:08
12.	"Wonderman" (featuring Ellie Goulding)	Okogwu; McKenzie; Williams	Labrinth; Da Digglar^{[a]}	3:39
13.	"Let Go" (featuring Emeli Sandé)	Okogwu; Shahid Khan; Ben Harrison; Haynie; Emeli Sandé	Naughty Boy; Emile Haynie^{[b]}; Ben Harrison^{[b]}	4:18

Notes

- Track listing and credits from album booklet.
- ^{^a} signifies a co-producer
- ^{^b} signifies an additional producer
- ^{^c} signifies a remixer
- "Intro" features uncredited vocals from Vanya Taylor.
- "Simply Unstoppable" features uncredited vocals from Vanya Taylor
- "Pass Out" features uncredited vocals from Labrinth
- "Illusion" features uncredited vocals from Sam Frank
- "Snap" features uncredited vocals from Mark Asari

== Charts and certifications ==
=== Weekly charts ===
Chart (2010–11)	Peak position
Australian Albums (ARIA)	71
Canadian Albums (Billboard)	24
European Top 100 Albums	7
German Newcomer Chart	16
Irish Albums (IRMA)	2
New Zealand Albums (RMNZ)	31
Scottish Albums (Official Charts)	1
Swiss Albums (Schweizer Hitparade)	73
UK Albums (Official Charts)	1
US Billboard 200	21
US Top R&B/Hip-Hop Albums (Billboard)	2

=== Year-end charts ===
Chart (2010)	Position
UK Albums (OCC)	29
Chart (2011)	Position
UK Albums (OCC)	28
US Top R&B/Hip-Hop Albums (Billboard)	89

=== Decade-end charts ===
Chart (2010–2019)	Position
UK Albums (OCC)	62

=== Certifications ===
Region	Certification	Certified units/sales
New Zealand (RMNZ)	Platinum	15,000^{‡}
United Kingdom (BPI)	3× Platinum	873,000
^{‡} Sales+streaming figures based on certification alone.

== Release history ==
Region	Date	Format	Label
Ireland	1 October 2010	Digital download; CD	Parlophone Records
Spain	4 October 2010	Digital download; CD	Parlophone Records
United Kingdom	4 October 2010	Digital download; CD	Parlophone Records
Germany	22 November 2010	Digital download; CD	Parlophone Records
Italy	22 November 2010	Digital download; CD	Parlophone Records
United States	17 May 2011	Digital download; CD	Capitol Records
Brazil	10 June 2011	Digital download; CD	Capitol Records

== See also ==
- List of UK Albums Chart number ones of the 2010s
- List of number-one albums from the 2010s (Scotland)
