= Hitz (song) =

Single by Chase & Status featuring Tinie Tempah

from the album No More Idols
- Released: 15 July 2011
- Recorded: 2010
- Genre: Hip-hop; electronica; grime
- Length: 3:08
- Label: Mercury; MTA; RAM
- Songwriters: Will Kennard; Saul Milton; Patrick Okogwu; Kivanc Sezen
- Producers: Chase & Status

Chase & Status singles chronology
"Time" (2011)	"Hitz" (2011)	"Flashing Lights" (2011)

Tinie Tempah singles chronology
"Simply Unstoppable" (2011)	"Hitz" (2011)	"Till I'm Gone" (2011)

Music video
- "Hitz" on YouTube

"Hitz" is a single from English record production duo Chase & Status, featuring vocals from British rapper Tinie Tempah. The single was released in the United Kingdom on 15 July 2011 as the fourth single from their second studio album, No More Idols. It peaked at number 39 on the UK Singles Chart and number 11 on the UK Dance Chart. The song features a spoken word sample from the 1973 film The Harder They Come. On 22 February 2012, it was featured in the BBC drama series Waterloo Road. Tinie re-used the "tick, tick, tick, tick, boom to you fellas" vocal sample on the Demonstration bonus track "5 Minutes", produced by Zane Lowe.

== Background ==
Originally the demo was sent to British rapper Dubbledge but Chase & Status later managed to get Tinie Tempah on the song instead. Dubbledge released his version titled "Chess" for free on 6 October 2011. The single version of the song features an additional chorus performed between Tempah's verses by Kivanc Sezen, which does not appear on the album version. The single version was released on 15 July 2011 as a digital download in the United Kingdom. A music video to accompany the release of "Hitz" was first released onto YouTube on 10 June 2011 at a total length of three minutes and fourteen seconds. The music video was filmed in New York and was directed by AG Rojas. The video portrays Tempah and Chase & Status performing the track in an underground club, while a young boy struggles to survive up on the surface.

== Track listing ==
- 12" vinyl
1. "Hitz" (Delta Heavy Remix) – 4:35
2. "Hitz" (16bit Remix) – 4:13
- Promotional CD single No. 1
1. "Hitz" (Single Version) – 3:08
2. "Hitz" (Wretch 32 Remix) – 3:30
- Promotional CD single No. 2
1. "Hitz" (Wretch 32 Remix) – 3:30
2. "Hitz" (16bit Remix) – 4:13
3. "Hitz" (Delta Heavy Remix) – 4:35
4. "Hitz" (Dillon Francis Remix) – 4:17
- Promotional CD single No. 3
1. "Hitz" (Wretch 32 Remix) – 3:30
2. "Hitz" (Original Clean Single Version) – 3:08
3. "Hitz" (Instrumental) – 3:08
- Digital download EP
1. "Hitz" (Single Version) – 3:08
2. "Hitz" (Wretch 32 Remix) – 3:30
3. "Hitz" (16bit Remix) – 4:13
4. "Hitz" (Delta Heavy Remix) – 4:35
5. "Hitz" (Dillon Francis Remix) – 4:17

== Credits and personnel ==
- Lead vocals – Tinie Tempah
- Producers – Saul Milton, William Kennard
- Songwriters – Saul Milton, Patrick Okogwu, William Kennard, Kivanc Sezen
- Backing vocals – Kivanc Sezen
- Label: Mercury Records

== Chart performance ==
Chart (2011)	Peak position
UK Dance (Official Charts)	11
UK Singles (Official Charts)	39

== Certifications ==
Region	Certification	Certified units/sales
United Kingdom (BPI)	Silver	200,000^{‡}
^{‡} Sales+streaming figures based on certification alone.

== Release history ==
Region	Date	Format	Label
United Kingdom	15 July 2011	12"; CD; digital download	Mercury
