= Time for Livin' (Sly and the Family Stone song) =

1974 single by Sly and the Family Stone

Single by Sly and the Family Stone

from the album Small Talk
- B-side: "Small Talk"
- Released: June 4, 1974
- Recorded: 1974
- Genre: Funk
- Length: 3:17
- Label: Epic
- Songwriter: Sylvester Stewart
- Producer: Sly Stone

Sly and the Family Stone singles chronology
"Frisky" (1973)	"Time for Livin'" (1974)	"Loose Booty" (1974)

"Time for Livin'" is a song by American band Sly and the Family Stone and the lead single from their seventh studio album Small Talk (1974).

American hip hop group Beastie Boys recorded a hardcore punk version of the song for their album Check Your Head (1992).

== Charts ==
Chart (1974)	Peak position
US Billboard Hot 100	32
US Hot R&B/Hip-Hop Songs (Billboard)	10
