= The Night's Not Dead =

Studio album by Tinie Tempah
- Released: 16 October 2026
- Length: 48:40
- Label: Imhotep Records
- Producers: August Twelfth; Dogger; Hargo; Sudley; Skepsis; A+E; Jason Cambridge; Matthew Early; Okan; Aladdin Awad; Daecolm; Sensu; Badger; Sid Stone; Peter Ferguson; Tom Demac; Punctual; Wilfy; Mombru; Xander; Billen Ted; Matt Wills; Afrojack; Stargate; Kai-A; Parkedup; Slic Vic

Tinie Tempah chronology
Youth (2017)	The Night's Not Dead (2026)

Singles from The Night's Not Dead
- 1. "Eat It Up" Released: 25 July 2025; 2. "Closer" Released: 26 September 2025; 3. "Energy" Released: 14 November 2025; 4. "Living Life" Released: 13 March 2026; 5. "Heaven or Hell" Released: 7 August 2026; 6. "To the Floor (Vai Descendo)" Released: 3 September 2026

Professional ratings
Review scores
Source	Rating
The Arts Desk	3/5 stars
MusicOMH	2/5 stars

The Night's Not Dead is the fourth studio album by British rapper Tinie Tempah, released on 16 October 2026 by Imhotep Records. It is his first album in nine years, following Youth (2017).

== Critical reception ==
Thomas H. Green of The Arts Desk says of the record, "The Night's Not Dead, on a couple of listens, seems lacking in such memorable stand-outs, but is full of feisty bounce and evokes its chosen mood well." Oliver Evans of MusicOMH, on the other hand, labels the album "far less inspired. Despite advocating for UK nightlife, all that Tinie Tempah can show on The Night's Not Dead is how he has lost touch with the dancefloor entirely."

Meanwhile, Jo Forrest of TotalNtertainment says, "Across the album and its wider campaign, Tinie is continuing to connect the underground with the mainstream – using his platform to put a spotlight on the artists, producers and sounds shaping what comes next."

== Track listing ==
The Night's Not Dead track listing
No.	Title	Writer(s)	Producer(s)	Length
1.	"Don't Ask Me About Last Night"	Liam Anthony Codner; Patrick Okogwu	August Twelfth	2:39
2.	"Start a Fight"	Okogwu; Harry Charles Gough; Robert Marc Smith	Dogger; Hargo	2:40
3.	"Backstage" (featuring Elipsa)	Okogwu; Molly Mexico Foster	Sudley	2:14
4.	"Eat It Up" (featuring Skepsis and Carla Monroe)	Okogwu; Carla Marie Nash; Jason Cambridge; Matthew Early; Reece Pullinger; Scott Jenkins	Skepsis	2:37
5.	"Closer" (featuring Abi Flynn)	Okogwu; Georgia Kate Millett Willacy	A+E; Cambridge; Early	4:41
6.	"10 Minutes Later"	Okogwu; Orkhan Orujov	Okan	3:23
7.	"Living Life" (featuring Daecolm)	Okogwu; Daecolm Holland	Aladdin Awad; Daecolm	2:37
8.	"Cause It Feels So Good"	Okogwu; Orujov; Jasmin Peterhans	Okan; Sensu	2:45
9.	"Rude" (featuring Badger and Travy)	Okogwu; Alexander Theodore Goodger-Marsh; Edward Phillips; Hayley Louise May; Lukman Omobolaji Onilenla; Pullinger	Badger; Sid Stone	2:10
10.	"Get My Attention"	Okogwu; Poppy Baskcomb; Tom Demac	Peter Ferguson; Demac	2:30
11.	"Energy" (featuring Alex Mills)	Okogwu; Mills; Holly Nikita Quin Ankrah; John Morgan; Codner; William Lansley	Punctual	3:13
12.	"Body 2 Body" (featuring Rahh)	Okogwu; Mills; Ankrah; Codner; Wilfred De Salis	Wilfy	3:43
13.	"Heaven or Hell" (featuring Reggie)	Okogwu; Christian Israel Mombru; Reginald John Sokeimeibi	Mombru; Xander	2:44
14.	"I Lied" (featuring Kah-Lo)	Okogwu; O'Donnell; Nana Rogues; Jake Bugg; Dominic McAllister	Billen Ted; Matt Wills	2:31
15.	"To the Floor (Vai Descendo)" (featuring Tropkillaz and Afrojack)	Okogwu; Andre Murilo da Silva; Jose Henrique Castanho de Godoy Pinheiro; Mikkel Storleer Eriksen; Nick van de Wall; Tor Erik Hermansen	Afrojack; Stargate	2:13
16.	"Long Way Home"	Okogwu; Alex Garfield; Robeal Yohannes Wauve	Kai-A; Parkedup	2:56
17.	"Studio Ghibli" (featuring HolyBrune)	Okogwu; Antoni Isidor Marí Marí; Antonio Lion Blakstad Molina; Antonio Prosper; Franco José Prats Alicio; Laura Chaudet; Pere Lluis Navarro Torres	Slic Vic	3:04
Total length:				48:40

Notes

- Credits are adapted from Tidal.

== Charts ==
Chart (2026)	Peak position
UK Albums (Official Charts)	20
UK Dance Albums (Official Charts)	1
UK Independent Albums (Official Charts)	3

== Release history ==
Region	Date	Format	Label
Worldwide	16 October 2026	Digital download	Imhotep Records
Worldwide	6 November 2026	CD; cassette	Imhotep Records
