= Brit Awards 2011 =

British music awards ceremony

- Date: 15 February 2011
- Venue: The O2 Arena
- Hosted by: James Corden

Highlights
- Most awards: Tinie Tempah and Arcade Fire (2)
- Most nominations: Tinie Tempah (4)

Television/radio coverage
- Network: ITV
- Viewership: 4.8 million

Brit Awards 2011 was the 31st edition of the British Phonographic Industry's annual pop music show, the Brit Awards. The awards ceremony was held on Tuesday 15 February 2011 at The O2 Arena in London for the first time in its history, moving from the original venue of Earls Court, also in London. The ceremony was hosted by James Corden. Leading the nominations was Tinie Tempah with four nominations. The artists with the most awards won were Tinie Tempah and Arcade Fire, with two wins each. The 2011 awards were billed as a reboot of the Brit Awards format featuring a different venue, a new award statuette designed by Vivienne Westwood and a greater emphasis placed on music, particularly live performances. Whilst the re-working of the show was generally well received, the TV audience was the lowest for five years, with an average viewership of 4.8 million viewers peaking at 5.9 million.

== Performances ==
Artist(s)	Song(s)	UK Singles Chart reaction (week ending 26 February 2011)	UK Albums Chart reaction (week ending 26 February 2011)
Take That	"Kidz"	31 (+168)	Progress – 10 (non-mover)
Adele	"Someone Like You"	1 (+46)	21 – 1 (non-mover); 19 – 4 (+2)
Rihanna	"Only Girl (In the World)" "S&M" "What's My Name?"	25 (+5); 6 (+5); 20 (−1)	Loud – 3 (non-mover)
Mumford & Sons	"Timshel"	did not chart	Sigh No More – 2 (+13)
Plan B	"She Said" "Prayin'"	72 (debut)^{[A]}	The Defamation of Strickland Banks – 7 (+17)
Arcade Fire	"Ready to Start"	did not chart	The Suburbs – 14 (+38)
Tinie Tempah; Eric Turner; Labrinth	"Written in the Stars" "Miami 2 Ibiza" "Pass Out"	40 (debut)^{[A]}	Disc-Overy – 6 (+19)
CeeLo Green; Paloma Faith	"Forget You"	19 (+16)	CeeLo Green; The Lady Killer – 11 (+7) Paloma Faith; Do You Want the Truth or Something Beautiful? – 54 (+27)

== Winners and nominees ==
British Album of the Year (presented by Roger Daltrey)	British Producer of the Year
Mumford & Sons – Sigh No More; Plan B – The Defamation of Strickland Banks; Take That – Progress; Tinie Tempah – Disc-Overy; The xx – xx	Markus Dravs; Ethan Johns; John Leckie; Mike Pela; Stuart Price
British Single of the Year (presented by Alan Carr)	Critics' Choice Award (presented by Mark Ronson and Ellie Goulding)
Tinie Tempah – "Pass Out"; Alexandra Burke featuring Pitbull – "All Night Long"; Cheryl Cole – "Parachute"; Florence and the Machine – "You Got the Love"; Matt Cardle – "When We Collide"; Olly Murs – "Please Don't Let Me Go"; Plan B – "She Said"; Scouting for Girls – "This Ain't a Love Song"; Taio Cruz – "Dynamite"; The Wanted – "All Time Low"	Jessie J; James Blake; The Vaccines
British Male Solo Artist (presented by Dizzee Rascal)	British Female Solo Artist (presented by Boy George)
Plan B; Mark Ronson; Paul Weller; Robert Plant; Tinie Tempah	Laura Marling; Cheryl Cole; Ellie Goulding; Paloma Faith; Rumer
British Group (presented by Dermot O'Leary)	British Breakthrough Act (presented by Fearne Cotton)
Take That; Biffy Clyro; Gorillaz; Mumford & Sons; The xx	Tinie Tempah; Ellie Goulding; Mumford & Sons; Rumer; The xx
International Album (presented by Boris Becker)
Arcade Fire – The Suburbs; CeeLo Green – The Lady Killer; Eminem – Recovery; Katy Perry – Teenage Dream; Kings of Leon – Come Around Sundown
International Male Solo Artist (presented by Lewis Hamilton)	International Female Solo Artist (presented by Cheryl Cole)
Cee Lo Green; Bruce Springsteen; David Guetta; Eminem; Kanye West	Rihanna; Alicia Keys; Katy Perry; Kylie Minogue; Robyn
International Group (presented by Simon Le Bon and John Taylor)	International Breakthrough Act (presented by Will Young and Avril Lavigne)
Arcade Fire; The Black Eyed Peas; Kings of Leon; The Script; Vampire Weekend	Justin Bieber; Bruno Mars; Glee Cast; The National; The Temper Trap

== Multiple nominations and awards ==
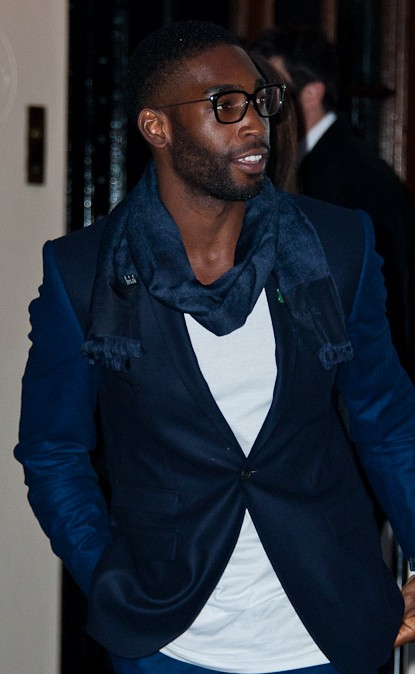
Two-time winner Tinie Tempah as most nominations and awards

Artists that received multiple nominations
Nominations	Artist
4	Tinie Tempah
3 (3)	Mumford & Sons
3 (3)	Plan B
3 (3)	The xx
2 (9)	Arcade Fire
2 (9)	CeeLo Green
2 (9)	Cheryl
2 (9)	Ellie Goulding
2 (9)	Eminem
2 (9)	Katy Perry
2 (9)	Kings of Leon
2 (9)	Rumer
2 (9)	Take That

Artists that received multiple awards
Awards	Artist
2 (2)	Arcade Fire
2 (2)	Tinie Tempah

== Moments ==
=== Adele's performance of "Someone Like You" ===
Adele performed her song "Someone Like You" at the ceremony with only a piano accompanying her. Her emotional performance was received with a standing ovation at the O2 Arena and the video received millions of hits on YouTube within days. The performance launched "Someone Like You" 46 spots up the UK charts to number one, and in the process, made Adele the first artist in the UK since The Beatles to have two top-five singles and two top-five albums at the same time.

=== James Corden, Justin Bieber, and Plan B ===
James Corden made jokes throughout the ceremony which drew criticism on social networking site Twitter. A targeted example was talking to acts in between awards when he came across Justin Bieber. In his trademark humour, Corden said to Bieber "You smell amazing! How old are you?". A bemused Bieber replied "thanks". Similarly, after Plan B's performance of his hit "Prayin'" finished with a man on fire, Corden described it as a really violent episode of Porridge and remarked "is Justin Bieber OK? The amount of hair products that boy uses. He could have gone up in flames." As the man on fire took to the stage during Plan B's performance, some of the crowd showed their disapproval and booed.

== Notes ==
- A These were released on iTunes as live performances.
