= Loose Booty (Sly and the Family Stone song) =

1974 single by Sly and the Family Stone

- Cover art from Spanish release

Single by Sly and the Family Stone

from the album Small Talk
- Released: 1974
- Genre: Funk
- Length: 3:46
- Label: Epic
- Songwriter(s): Sylvester Stewart
- Producer(s): Sly Stone

Sly and the Family Stone singles chronology
"Time for Livin'" (1974)	"Loose Booty" (1974)	"Family Again" (1976)

"Loose Booty" is a song by American band Sly and the Family Stone and the second single from their seventh studio album Small Talk (1974). An up-tempo funk track, it uses the names of Bible characters Shadrach, Meshach and Abednego as a chant.

The song was sampled in "Shadrach" by Beastie Boys, "Livin' Like Hustlers" by Above the Law and "Tie Goes To The Runner" by Public Enemy.

== Background ==
In his autobiography Thank You (Falettinme Be Mice Elf Agin), Sly Stone wrote of the song:

Mine was built on top of the story of Shadrach, Meshach, and Abednego. It was a Bible story: These men refused to worship King Nebuchadnezzar and were thrown in a fiery pit. But they didn't die. They came out, with a fourth figure leading them, the prophet Daniel. Shadrach, Meshach, and Abednego were figures of resistance. Louis Armstrong had a song about them. Martin Luther King, Jr. mentioned them when he wrote from the Birmingham Jail. I didn't retell the whole story but I wanted a taste of it in there. Music could help you resist everyday problems. Music could keep you out of the fire.

== Critical reception ==
In his review of Small Talk for Uncut, Peter Shapiro wrote "The great, weird 'Loose Booty', though, is almost worth the price of admission."

== Charts ==
Chart (1974)	Peak position
US Billboard Hot 100	84
US Hot R&B/Hip-Hop Songs (Billboard)	22
