= Miami 2 Ibiza =

2010 single by Swedish House Mafia and Tinie Tempah

Single by Swedish House Mafia vs. Tinie Tempah

from the album Until One
- Released: 1 October 2010
- Recorded: 2010
- Genre: Progressive house; hip house; EDM
- Length: 3:24 (original version); 6:15 (instrumental Version)
- Label: Virgin; EMI
- Songwriters: Axel "Axwell" Hedfors; Steve Angello; Sebastian Ingrosso; Patrick Okogwu
- Producer: Swedish House Mafia

Swedish House Mafia singles chronology
| "One" (2010) | "Miami 2 Ibiza" (2010) | "Save the World" (2011) |

Tinie Tempah singles chronology
| "Written in the Stars" (2010) | "Miami 2 Ibiza" (2010) | "Game Over" (2010) |

"Miami 2 Ibiza" is a song by Swedish house music group Swedish House Mafia and British rapper Tinie Tempah. It was released as the second and final single from the group's debut compilation album Until One (2010) by Virgin Records in October 2010. The song is also included on Tempah's debut album Disc-Overy (2010) and later on the group's second studio/compilation album, Until Now (2012). In January 2011, the single was certified gold in Australia.

== Critical reception ==
Nick Levine of Digital Spy gave the song a somewhat positive review stating:

"Urban British pop and commercial European dance are now such comfortable bedfellows that this collaboration between a trio of Scando knob-twiddling types and the best thing to come out of Plumstead since Shampoo barely raises a brow. Up next: Basshunter ft. Ms Dynamite? However, just because the two genres are comfortable bedfellows doesn't mean the earth moves every time they do the dirty. Tinie Tempah steers 'Miami 2 Ibiza' towards its big whooshy bridge and trancey arms-in-the-air chorus with his customary lyrical flair, but the result still feels like the musical equivalent of the Cam 'n' Cleggy coalition. You couldn't accuse it of being ineffective, but you wouldn't say it works entirely seamlessly either.

== Music video ==
The music video was directed by Christian Larson and was uploaded to YouTube on 1 October 2010. The video shows a videotape being made of a couple's vacation, with some shots of Tinie Tempah and the Swedish House Mafia performing. The video was shot chronologically and the shoot started in Miami. Larson said: "The video is also meant to depict a kind of powerful independent woman, someone who takes from life what they want and does what they want." Most of the video is set on one woman and follows her around with a video camera on a journey from Miami in Florida to Ibiza in Spain.

== Track listing ==
- Digital download
1. "Miami 2 Ibiza" - 3:24
- Digital download - Instrumental
1. "Miami 2 Ibiza" (Instrumental) - 6:15
- Digital EP
1. "Miami 2 Ibiza" (Clean Radio Edit) - 2:57
2. "Miami 2 Ibiza" (Explicit Radio Edit) - 2:57
3. "Miami 2 Ibiza" (Extended Vocal Mix) - 5:05
4. "Miami 2 Ibiza" (Instrumental) - 6:15
5. "Miami 2 Ibiza" (Sander Van Doorn Remix) - 5:57
6. "Miami 2 Ibiza" (Danny Byrd Remix) - 5:14
- 12" vinyl #1
1. "Miami 2 Ibiza" (Danny Byrd Instrumental) - 5:14
2. "Miami 2 Ibiza" (Danny Byrd Remix) - 5:14
3. "Miami 2 Ibiza" (Danny Byrd Dub) - 5:20
- 12" vinyl #2
1. "Miami 2 Ibiza" (Instrumental) - 6:15
2. "Miami 2 Ibiza" (Extended Vocal Mix) - 5:05
3. "Miami 2 Ibiza" (Sander Van Doorn Remix) - 5:57
- 2011 BRIT Awards Performance
1. "Written in the Stars" (featuring Eric Turner) / "Miami 2 Ibiza" / "Pass Out" (featuring Labrinth) (Live from the BRITs) - 4:43

== Charts ==
=== Weekly charts ===
| Chart (2010–11) | Peak position |
|---|---|
| Austria (Ö3 Austria Top 40) | 36 |
| Belgium (Ultratop 50 Flanders) | 3 |
| Belgium (Ultratop 50 Wallonia) | 3 |
| Canada (Canadian Hot 100) | 92 |
| Denmark (Tracklisten) | 22 |
| European Hot 100 Singles | 8 |
| Finland (Suomen virallinen lista) | 16 |
| France (SNEP) | 71 |
| Germany (GfK) | 46 |
| Hungary (Dance Top 40) | 19 |
| Ireland (IRMA) | 5 |
| Netherlands (Dutch Top 40) | 10 |
| Netherlands (Single Top 100) | 1 |
| Poland (Dance Top 50) | 12 |
| Scottish Singles Sales (Official Charts) | 4 |
| Slovakia Airplay (ČNS IFPI) | 18 |
| Sweden (Sverigetopplistan) | 10 |
| Switzerland (Schweizer Hitparade) | 19 |
| UK Dance (Official Charts) | 1 |
| UK Singles (Official Charts) | 4 |
| US Dance Club Songs (Billboard) | 1 |
| US Dance Airplay (Billboard) | 8 |

=== Year-end charts ===
| Chart (2010) | Position |
|---|---|
| Belgium (Ultratop Flanders) | 61 |
| Netherlands (Dutch Top 40) | 71 |
| Sweden (Sverigetopplistan) | 37 |
| UK Singles (Official Charts Company) | 74 |

| Chart (2011) | Position |
|---|---|
| Hungary (Dance Top 40) | 77 |
| Polish Dance Singles Chart | 32 |
| Sweden (Sverigetopplistan) | 89 |
| UK Singles (Official Charts Company) | 168 |
| US Dance Club Songs (Billboard) | 40 |
| US Dance/Mix Show Airplay (Billboard) | 35 |

== Certifications ==
| Region | Certification | Certified units/sales |
|---|---|---|
| Australia (ARIA) | 2× Platinum | 140,000^{‡} |
| Canada (Music Canada) | Gold | 40,000^{‡} |
| New Zealand (RMNZ) | Gold | 15,000^{‡} |
| Sweden (GLF) | 5× Platinum | 200,000^{‡} |
| United Kingdom (BPI) | 2× Platinum | 1,200,000^{‡} |
^{‡} Sales+streaming figures based on certification alone.

== Release history ==
| Region | Date | Format | Label |
|---|---|---|---|
| United Kingdom | 1 October 2010 | Digital download; 12" vinyl | Polydor |
| United States | 11 April 2011 | Digital download | Capitol Records |

== See also ==
- List of number-one dance hits of 2010 (UK)
- List of number-one dance singles of 2011 (U.S.)
