= Written in the Stars (Tinie Tempah song) =

2010 single by Tinie Tempah

Single by Tinie Tempah featuring Eric Turner

from the album Disc-Overy
- Released: 19 September 2010
- Recorded: November 2009
- Genre: Pop; pop rap; rap rock
- Length: 3:39
- Label: Disturbing London; Parlophone
- Songwriters: Patrick Okogwu; Eshraque Mughal; Eric Turner; Charlie Bernardo
- Producer: iSHi

Tinie Tempah singles chronology
| "Frisky" (2010) | "Written in the Stars" (2010) | "Miami 2 Ibiza" (2010) |

Eric Turner singles chronology
| "Written in the Stars" (2010) | "Angels & Stars" (2012) |

Music video
- "Written in the Stars" on YouTube

"Written in the Stars" is a song recorded by English rapper Tinie Tempah featuring American singer Eric Turner. It was released on 19 September 2010, through Disturbing London and Parlophone. It was written alongside Charlie Bernardo and producer iSHi, and is the third single from Tinie Tempah's debut studio album Disc-Overy (2010). Musically, the song has been described as pop, pop rap, and rap rock, with lyrics addressing overcoming hardship and finding success.

"Written in the Stars" received positive reviews from critics, who praised Turner's contributions and the song's message. Commercially, the song topped the UK Singles Chart, becoming Tinie Tempah's second domestic number one single, and peaked at number twelve on the Billboard Hot 100, becoming his highest-charting single in the United States. A music video for the song was directed by Alex Herron and uploaded onto YouTube on 13 August 2010, and depicts a young boy and his mother who suffer a financially insecure life.

"Written in the Stars" has featured in several sporting events: it was used by Major League Baseball for the 2011 postseason and by Sky Sports for their coverage of the Premier League from 2011 until 2015. It was also chosen by WWE as the theme song for WrestleMania XXVII, was the entrance song for the New York Giants at Super Bowl XLVI, and played at the closing ceremony of the 2012 Summer Olympics. Tinie Tempah also performed the song at the 2016 FA Cup Final.

== Background ==
"Written in the Stars" was written by "iSHi", Tempah, Turner and Charlie Bernardo and produced by iSHi. Tinie Tempah first revealed the song on 17 June 2010 performing it live on Sony Ericsson's Pocket TV along with "Frisky". Tempah said "Written in the Stars it is a real passionate track about the sort of struggle that I've had to face. You know I just really feel it as something to perform at festivals as well so I thought I might as well get my practice and start warming up now." The song was released on 27 September 2010, followed by Disc-Overy on 4 October 2010. ¨Written in The Stars¨ is written in the key of A minor.

== Critical reception ==
Robert Copsey of Digital Spy gave the song a very positive review:

Tempah makes abundantly clear on single number three that success wasn't handed to him on a platinum dinnerware set marked 'Doulton'. Au contraire, it was an exhausting journey of "believing and praying" in a dream that, for a time, "wasn't going nowhere" – and with his ear-snagging rhymes cloaked in a stadium-sized chorus courtesy of US newbie Eric Turner, we're all going to hear about it whether we want to or not. Oh Tinie, we'll never doubt your work hard, play hard mentality again..

== Music video ==
Tinie Tempah pointing up into the sky in the video.

The official music video was directed by Alex Herron and was released on YouTube by Parlophone on 13 August 2010, along with a 43-second trailer of the video three days before. The video, shot in New York City, features Tinie Tempah standing and rapping on the roof while Eric Turner is sitting on the piano in a white room playing the chorus. The narrative scenes see a young boy whose life is shaped by the fact he and his mother are subjected to a financially insecure life and he is regularly bullied by his peers. After an interview with Virgin Media, the rapper claimed the boy 'not to be his younger self in the tennis courts' – he was trying to portray the life of a city boy. It made its US debut on 1 February 2011.

== Chart performance ==
On 13 September 2010, "Written in the Stars" debuted on the New Zealand Singles Chart at number 22, beating "Pass Out", which peaked at number 33 on the chart in March 2010. It later peaked at number 16. The single also managed to chart in Switzerland, where it debuted at number 71 on 26 September 2010, Tempah's first single to make an impact in the country. On 3 October 2010, the track charted at No. 1 in the UK Singles Chart and UK R&B Chart, beating "Just the Way You Are" by Bruno Mars and "Let the Sun Shine" by Labrinth, making "Written in the Stars" Tinie Tempah's second number 1 in the UK after "Pass Out". "Written in the Stars" sold over 115,000 copies in its first week alone, which at that point of the year was a first week figure surpassed only by "California Gurls" by Katy Perry featuring Snoop Dogg (124,000) and the charity single "Everybody Hurts" by Helping Haiti (over 450,000). In the European Hot 100, the song debuted at number 5, the highest debut of the week. In January 2011, the single reached a peak position of number 34 and was certified Platinum in Australia. The song became Tinie Tempah's first song to chart on the Billboard Hot 100, debuting at number 91 for the week ending 5 March 2011 and peaking at number 12.

== Track listings ==
- Digital download
1. "Written in the Stars" (Album Version) – 3:40
- Digital EP
1. "Written in the Stars" (Album Version) – 3:39
2. "Written in the Stars" (Instrumental) – 3:39
3. "Written in the Stars" (The Arcade Southside Remix) (featuring Taio Cruz) – 3:33
- Promotional CD single
1. "Written in the Stars" (Radio Edit) – 3:33
2. "Written in the Stars" (Album Version) – 3:40
3. "Written in the Stars" (Instrumental) – 3:39
4. "Written in the Stars" (Remix) (featuring Ryan Tedder) – 3:40
- 2011 BRIT Awards Performance
1. "Written in the Stars" (featuring Eric Turner) / "Miami 2 Ibiza" / "Pass Out" (featuring Labrinth) (Live from the BRITs) – 4:43

== Charts ==
=== Weekly charts ===
| Chart (2010–2011) | Peak position |
|---|---|
| Australia (ARIA) | 34 |
| Austria (Ö3 Austria Top 40) | 75 |
| Belgium (Ultratip Bubbling Under Flanders) | 5 |
| Belgium (Ultratip Bubbling Under Wallonia) | 9 |
| Canada Hot 100 (Billboard) | 18 |
| Czech Republic Airplay (ČNS IFPI) | 3 |
| Denmark (Tracklisten) | 18 |
| Europe (European Hot 100 Singles) | 5 |
| Finland (Suomen virallinen lista) | 7 |
| France (SNEP) | 21 |
| Germany (GfK) | 83 |
| Ireland (IRMA) | 1 |
| Mexico Anglo (Monitor Latino) | 17 |
| Netherlands (Dutch Top 40) | 19 |
| Netherlands (Single Top 100) | 33 |
| New Zealand (Recorded Music NZ) | 13 |
| Norway (VG-lista) | 2 |
| Romania (Romanian Top 100) | 10 |
| Russia Airplay (TopHit) | 9 |
| Scotland Singles (OCC) | 1 |
| Slovakia Airplay (ČNS IFPI) | 12 |
| Sweden (Sverigetopplistan) | 10 |
| Switzerland (Schweizer Hitparade) | 47 |
| UK Singles (OCC) | 1 |
| UK Hip Hop/R&B (OCC) | 1 |
| Ukraine Airplay (TopHit) | 64 |
| US Billboard Hot 100 | 12 |
| US Dance Club Songs (Billboard) | 34 |
| US Dance/Mix Show Airplay (Billboard) | 11 |
| US Hot Rap Songs (Billboard) | 19 |
| US Pop Airplay (Billboard) | 7 |
| US Rhythmic Airplay (Billboard) | 12 |

=== Year-end charts ===
| Chart (2010) | Position |
|---|---|
| Russia Airplay (TopHit) | 170 |
| Sweden (Sverigetopplistan) | 38 |
| UK Singles (OCC) | 31 |

| Chart (2011) | Position |
|---|---|
| Brazil (Crowley) | 95 |
| Canada (Canadian Hot 100) | 68 |
| Romania (Romanian Top 100) | 13 |
| Russia Airplay (TopHit) | 39 |
| Ukraine Airplay (TopHit) | 99 |
| UK Singles (OCC) | 140 |
| US Billboard Hot 100 | 63 |
| US Mainstream Top 40 (Billboard) | 37 |
| US Rhythmic (Billboard) | 45 |

== Certifications ==
Certifications for Written in the Stars
| Region | Certification | Certified units/sales |
|---|---|---|
| Australia (ARIA) | Platinum | 70,000^{^} |
| Canada (Music Canada) | Platinum | 80,000^{*} |
| Denmark (IFPI Danmark) | Gold | 45,000^{‡} |
| New Zealand (RMNZ) | Platinum | 15,000^{*} |
| Norway (IFPI Norway) | 10× Platinum | 100,000^{*} |
| Sweden (GLF) | Platinum | 40,000^{‡} |
| United Kingdom (BPI) | 2× Platinum | 1,200,000^{‡} |
| United States (RIAA) | Platinum | 1,000,000^{*} |
^{*} Sales figures based on certification alone.^{^} Shipments figures based on certification alone.^{‡} Sales+streaming figures based on certification alone.

== In popular culture ==
=== Parody versions ===
In 2012, a parody of the video was made by the cast and crew of ITV soap opera Emmerdale in honour of the departure of character Aaron Livesy, played by Danny Miller, who is a big fan of the song. The role of Tinie Tempah was played by Adam Thomas, who plays Adam Barton (Aaron's best friend in the soap), and the role of Eric Turner was played by Kelvin Fletcher, who plays Andy Sugden. The video features many well-known Emmerdale actors such as Emma Atkins, Jeff Hordley, Lucy Pargeter, Sammy Winward, Nicola Wheeler, Charley Webb, Natalie Anderson, Sian Reese-Williams and veteran actor Freddie Jones.

In 2022, a parody of the YouTube video was made by 442oons at the start of the 2022–23 Premier League season, in reference to Sky Sports' coverage of Premier League football from 2011–12 to 2014–15, which used the song as its opening billboard.

=== Sports ===
The song was used in commercials for 2011 Major League Baseball postseason. The New York Giants used this song for their entrance for Super Bowl XLVI. The song was also used as the theme song for WWE WrestleMania 27 in 2011.

=== Television ===
The instrumental of the song was used as the theme song for Steps’ documentary, Steps reunion.

== Covers ==
The Mend performed a mashup of "(I Just) Died in Your Arms" and "Written in the Stars" for their semi-final performance on Britain's Got Talent in 2012.

Karmin recorded a cover of "Written in the Stars" on their YouTube channel.

== Release history ==
| Region | Date | Format | Label |
|---|---|---|---|
| Switzerland | 19 September 2010 | Digital download | Parlophone |
| United Kingdom | 24 September 2010 | Digital download | Parlophone |
| United States | 18 January 2011 | Digital download | Capitol |
| United States | 1 February 2011 | Mainstream airplay | Capitol |

== See also ==
- List of number-one singles of 2010 (Ireland)
- List of number-one singles from the 2010s (UK)
- List of number-one R&B hits of 2010 (UK)
