= Pass Out (Tinie Tempah song) =

2010 single by Tinie Tempah

Single by Tinie Tempah

from the album Disc-Overy
- Released: 28 February 2010
- Recorded: 2009
- Genre: Hip hop; electronic; grime; drum and bass
- Length: 4:28 (album version); 3:57 (radio edit)
- Label: Parlophone
- Songwriters: Timothy McKenzie; Patrick Okogwu; Marc Williams
- Producer: Labrinth

Tinie Tempah singles chronology
"Tears" (2008)	"Pass Out" (2010)	"Frisky" (2010)

Labrinth singles chronology
"Pass Out" (2010)	"Frisky" (2010)

U.S. cover
- U.S. cover for "Pass Out"

"Pass Out" is a single by British rapper Tinie Tempah. It is the lead single from his debut studio album Disc-Overy (2010) and his debut single on Parlophone. The song was a digital-only release and was available to download in the United Kingdom on 28 February 2010.

British producer and writer Labrinth provides uncredited vocals on the song's hook. "Pass Out" peaked at the top of the UK Singles Chart. A remix featuring American rapper Snoop Dogg was released in the United States on 16 November 2010 for digital download. In 2011, Labrinth revealed that Tinie would be releasing "Pass Out" in the US. It was re-serviced to radio stations in the United States as the third single from Disc-Overy in October 2011.

"Pass Out" won British Single of the Year at the 2011 Brit Awards and Best Contemporary Song at the 2011 Ivor Novello Awards. The song is featured on the Madden NFL 12 soundtrack.

== Background ==
After signing to Parlophone, Tinie Tempah was put together with producer Labrinth and the collaboration resulted in the first two singles for the label, "Frisky" and "Pass Out". Parlophone president Miles Leonard said the label was adamant that "Pass Out" would be the first single, saying: "It set new precedents for British urban music from what had been happening the year before. And it was a new sound; it sounded fresh, and like it came from the clubs. Both "Pass Out" & "Frisky" were mixed by London's up and coming mix engineer Mr Jones @ Detox Audio." However, the label thought the song may have had too much of "an edge" for daytime mainstream radio to take a risk in playing it, and so planned it as a low-key "set up single" that was instead made available to specialist radio stations. The song ended up getting such an enthusiastic reaction from specialist radio audiences that it was crossed over onto daytime mainstream rotation. The song also mentions Heidi Montag and Audrina Patridge from the American reality series The Hills, Uncle Fester from the American sitcom The Addams Family, action star Jean-Claude Van Damme and a suggested mention of Prince William ("Soon I'll be the King like Prince Charles' child").

BBC Radio 1 coverage includes plays from Zane Lowe, Jo Whiley, MistaJam (who gave the song its first radio play on 12 December 2009), Ras Kwame, Tim Westwood (who gave the record its premiere on BBC Radio 1Xtra on 7 December 2009), Trevor Nelson, Fearne Cotton and Nick Grimshaw. "Pass Out" received early playlist support from BBC Radio 1Xtra and Kiss along with strong spot plays on BBC Radio 1, including a "Record of the Week" with Nick Grimshaw. The song is also available as a free download on the game Tap Tap Revenge 3. "Pass Out" features in the UK commercial for Assassin's Creed: Brotherhood. It was also briefly featured in a scene in the 2011 remake of the film Arthur. American alternative hip hop group Chiddy Bang have also issued a remix of the song. McFly also did a cover of "Pass Out" at Towneley Festival 2011.

== Chart performance ==
"Pass Out" entered at number one on the UK Singles Chart and UK R&B Chart, selling just over 92,000 copies. The single held on to the top spot for two consecutive weeks (keeping "Rude Boy" by Rihanna at no.2) before falling one place in favour of Lady Gaga and Beyoncé's single "Telephone". The single spent a total of seven weeks within the top ten before falling to number thirteen. As of 17 July 2010, the single had spent a total of 19 weeks within the top forty of the UK Singles Chart. The song then re-entered the Top forty at number thirty at the start of 2011, showing the song's popularity, 44 weeks after release. It then re-entered again at number 32 a few weeks later, due to his performance at the 2011 BRIT awards. It spent a total of 65 weeks on the UK Singles Chart.

In the Republic of Ireland, "Pass Out" debuted number thirteen on the Irish Singles Chart. In its fourth week on the chart, the single climbed to its peak position of number six, where it remained for two consecutive weeks. The single spent a total of four weeks in the top 10 and, as of 3 June 2010, a total of thirty weeks within the top fifty. In New Zealand, "Pass Out" debuted in the New Zealand Singles Chart on 10 May 2010 at number 40. The following week, it climbed seven places to number 33, where it remained for two consecutive weeks.

== Music video ==
The music video is focused around Tinie rapping and Labrinth, who sings the chorus, coming into the shot. Other British rappers, including Skepta & JME from Boy Better Know, G Frsh and Wretch 32 also make cameo appearances. The video on Parlophone's official YouTube channel has had over 71 million views since its upload on 23 December 2009. Tim Bown, the director of the video, said in the behind-the-scenes video that they were trying to create graphical elements, including laser-cut props.

== Track listing ==
- Digital download – EP
1. "Pass Out" (Album Version) – 4:27
2. "Pass Out" (Clean Radio Edit) – 3:56
3. "Pass Out" (DC Breaks Remix) – 4:31
4. "Pass Out" (Instrumental) – 4:27
5. "Pass Out" (Video) – 3:56
- Record Store Day 7" vinyl
1. "Pass Out" (Album Version) – 4:27
2. "Pass Out" (SBTRKT Remix) – 4:46
- Promotional CD single
1. "Pass Out" (Clean Radio Edit) – 3:56
2. "Pass Out" (Album Version) – 4:27
3. "Pass Out" (Instrumental Version) – 4:27
4. "Pass Out" (Original Radio Edit) – 3:33
- 2011 BRIT Awards Performance
1. "Written in the Stars" (featuring Eric Turner) / "Miami 2 Ibiza" / "Pass Out" (featuring Labrinth) (Live from the BRITs) – 4:43

== Charts ==
=== Weekly charts ===
Chart (2010)	Peak position
Australia (ARIA)	70
European Hot 100 Singles	7
Germany (German Black Chart)	6
Ireland (IRMA)	6
New Zealand (Recorded Music NZ)	33
Scotland Singles (Official Charts)	1
UK Hip Hop/R&B (Official Charts)	1
UK Singles (Official Charts)	1

=== Year-end charts ===
Chart (2010)	Position
European Hot 100 Singles	70
UK Singles (OCC)	10

Chart (2011)	Position
UK Singles (OCC)	145

== Certifications ==
Region	Certification	Certified units/sales
New Zealand (RMNZ)	Platinum	30,000^{‡}
United Kingdom (BPI)	3× Platinum	1,800,000^{‡}
^{‡} Sales+streaming figures based on certification alone.

== Release history ==
Release dates and formats for "Pass Out"
Region	Date	Format	Label(s)	Ref.
United States	8 November 2011	Mainstream airplay	Capitol	

== See also ==
- List of UK Singles Chart number ones of the 2010s
- List of UK R&B Singles Chart number ones of 2010
