= Frisky (Tinie Tempah song) =

2010 single by Tinie Tempah

Single by Tinie Tempah featuring Labrinth

from the album Disc-Overy
- Released: 7 June 2010
- Recorded: 2010
- Genre: British hip hop; drum and bass
- Length: 3:41 (radio edit); 4:55 (album version)
- Label: Parlophone; DL
- Songwriters: Timothy McKenzie; Patrick Okogwu; Marc Williams
- Producers: Labrinth; Da Diggler

Tinie Tempah singles chronology
"Pass Out" (2010)	"Frisky" (2010)	"Written in the Stars" (2010)

Labrinth singles chronology
"Pass Out" (2010)	"Frisky" (2010)	"Let the Sun Shine" (2010)

"Frisky" is a song by English rapper Tinie Tempah, crediting the song's producer Labrinth as its featured artist. The track was released in the United Kingdom on 7 June 2010 as the second single from the musician's debut studio album, Disc-Overy (2010). On the chart week ending 19 June 2010, "Frisky" debuted at number two on the UK Singles Chart behind "Shout" by Shout for England; in Scotland, it debuted at number one, becoming Tempah's second number-one single there.

== Background ==
"Frisky" was first revealed on the radio show 'Koko Pop' on 17 April 2010, where both Tempah and Labrinth performed the track live. It was then four days later, on 21 April, that "Frisky" received its first radio play—from BBC Radio 1 DJ Zane Lowe. Speaking to Lowe of the track, Tempah said: "After Pass Out came out, there was a little bit of 'gosh', yeah the second one, we gotta get it right. Ultimately Zane, as you can probably tell, the record is about having a lot of fun and just trying to push boundaries and make unconventional music that doesn't have to sound a certain way. I just had fun with it, to be honest." before informing Lowe that "I learnt the kind of effective, during all the performances, especially doing Pass Out. It's a tune that kind of really connects with those sounds."

== Critical reception ==
Nick Levine of Digital Spy gave the song a very positive review:

He's already explained precisely how he likes to party - 'til he and his mates "pass out", of course - and now he's got something else to get off his rapidly-swelling chest. Namely his intention to get inside the knickers of a well-turned out, All Saints-sporting fitty who "likes to talk a lot - that's why I call her Trisha". Yes, Tinie Tempah's lines are just as ear-snagging here as they were on his chart-topping debut. Once again, Labrinth fulfils his part of the bargain too, cloaking them in a drum 'n' bass-cum-electropop production that's positively brimming with hooks and vocal trickery. The result? A bit like your barnet after a trip to a trendy East London barbers - sleek and shiny for sure, but pretty street with it..

== Track listings ==
Digital EP
No.	Title	Length
1.	"Frisky" (Album Version)	4:55
2.	"Frisky" (Radio Edit)	3:39
3.	"Frisky" (Shy FX & Benny Page Digital Soundboy Remix)	5:01
4.	"Frisky" (South Rakkas Crew 'Fuck Me' Remix)	4:55
5.	"Frisky" (Kurtis Mantronik 'La La La' Remix)	5:58

German CD single
No.	Title	Length
1.	"Frisky" (Radio Edit)	3:39
2.	"Frisky" (Craze & Hoax Remix)	4:55

Promotional CD single
No.	Title	Length
1.	"Frisky" (Album Version)	4:55
2.	"Frisky" (Radio Edit)	3:39
3.	"Frisky" (Instrumental)	4:55

Promotional EP
No.	Title	Length
1.	"Frisky" (Album Version)	4:55
2.	"Frisky" (Shy FX & Benny Page Digital Soundboy Remix)	4:34
3.	"Frisky" (TC Remix)	6:45
4.	"Frisky" (South Rakkas Crew 'Fuck Me' Remix)	4:55
5.	"Frisky" (Kurtis Mantronik Club Remix)	7:56
6.	"Frisky" (Craze & Hoak Remix)	4:55

== Music video ==
The HD video of the song was uploaded onto Parlophone's official YouTube channel on 21 April 2010. On the day, the track received 300 views; reaching 63,000 views by 23 April; and soon after over 140,000 views. Just three weeks after its upload to YouTube, the song had over 940,000 views. It passed the one million mark on 12 May and by 20 July it had over 4,500,000 views. The video features Tinie Tempah and Labrinth in a derelict stone building, surrounded by several female dancers (including Funda Önal) and bright disco lights.

== Usage in media ==
"Frisky" was featured in the soundtrack of the 2010 racing video game Need for Speed: Hot Pursuit.

== Charts ==
=== Weekly charts ===
Chart (2010)	Peak position
Europe (European Hot 100 Singles)	11
Ireland (IRMA)	3
Scotland Singles (OCC)	1
UK Singles (OCC)	2
UK Hip Hop/R&B (OCC)	1

=== Year-end charts ===
Chart (2010)	Position
UK Singles (OCC)	50

== Sales and certifications ==
Region	Certification	Certified units/sales
United Kingdom (BPI)	Platinum	600,000^{‡}
^{‡} Sales+streaming figures based on certification alone.

== Release history ==
Region	Date	Format	Ref.
United Kingdom	6 June 2010	Digital download	
Germany	7 June 2010	CD single	

== See also ==
- List of UK R&B Singles Chart number ones of 2010
