= Tinie Tempah =

British rapper and singer (born 1988)

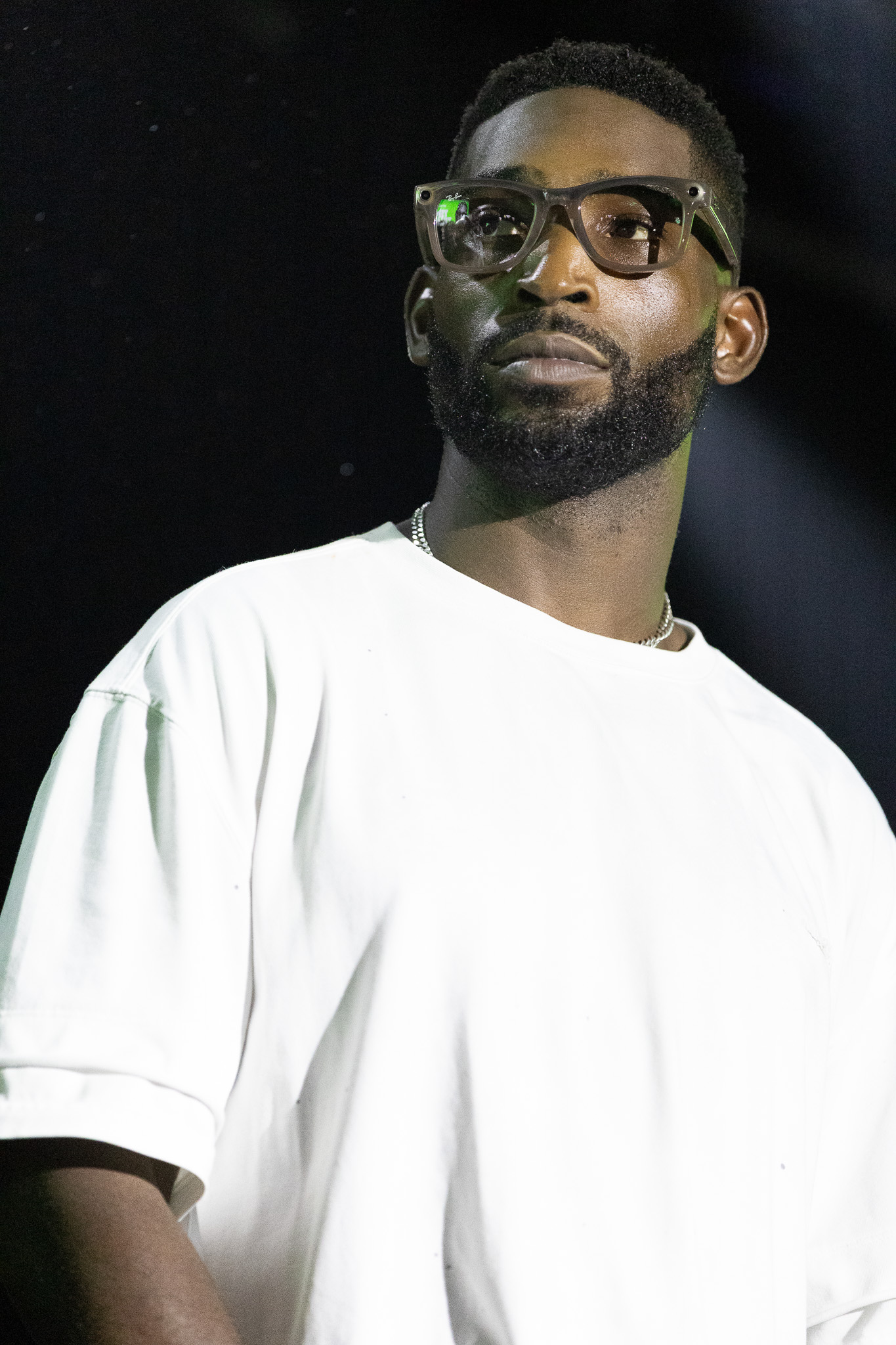
- Tinie in 2025

Background information
- Born: Patrick Chukwuemeka Okogwu; 7 November 1988 (age 38); London, England
- Origin: Plumstead, London, England
- Genres: Hip hop; electronic; dance-pop; UK rap
- Occupations: Rapper; singer; songwriter; television presenter; guitarist; pianist
- Instruments: Vocals; guitar; piano
- Years active: 2005–present
- Labels: Parlophone; Disturbing London
- Formerly of: V Click; Sick Combination; Magic Circle Squad; Nu Brand Flexxx; Aftershock
- Website: tinietempah.com

Patrick Chukwuemeka Okogwu (born 7 November 1988), better known by his stage name Tinie Tempah (pronounced "tiny temper"; formerly Tinie), is an English rapper, singer and television presenter. Born and raised in London, he created his own entertainment company Disturbing London in 2006, alongside Dumi Oburota. After signing with Parlophone in 2009 and releasing several mixtapes, he rose to fame with the UK number-one singles "Pass Out" and "Written in the Stars" in 2010.

He subsequently released his debut album Disc-Overy in October 2010, which also charted at number one and was certified platinum in 2011. He won two Brit Awards in 2011 for Best British Breakthrough Act and Best British Single. In November 2013, he released his second album, entitled Demonstration. Preceded by top ten singles "Trampoline" and "Children of the Sun", the album charted at number three and was certified gold by the BPI the next year.

In June 2015, he released "Not Letting Go", the first single from his third album Youth. This gave Tinie his sixth UK number one, surpassing Dizzee Rascal as the most by any UK rap artist.

== Early life ==
Tinie was born as Patrick Chukwuemeka Okogwu on 7 November 1988 in London, the son of Igbo parents from Nigeria, Patrick Okogwu Sr. and Rosemary Opiah. His middle name, Chukwuemeka, means "God has done more" in the Igbo language.

Until he was twelve years old, Tinie lived on the Aylesbury Estate in south-east London with his parents and three younger siblings: Kelly, Kelvin, and Marian. The family later moved to Plumstead, with Tinie attending St. Paul's Catholic School in nearby Abbey Wood. After earning 10 GCSEs, he sat A-Levels in Media Studies, Psychology, and Religious Studies at Saint Francis Xavier Sixth Form College. At twelve years old, Tinie conceived his stage name after viewing the music video for So Solid Crew's "21 Seconds". He used a thesaurus in class, juxtaposing "tempah" (temper), which he saw under "angry", with "tinie" (tiny), to ameliorate the aggressive sound of "tempah".

Regarding his London upbringing, Tinie states, "London is one of the only places in the world where you can live in a council block and see a beautiful semi-detached house across the street. Growing up around that was inspirational, it kept me motivated."

== Career history ==
=== 2005–2008: Early career ===
Tinie, then known as Tinie Tempah, began his music career in 2005 when he joined the Aftershock Hooligans, recording hundreds of songs amongst the fellow Hooligans. His first mixtape, "Chapter 1: Verse 22", was released via Aftershock Records in 2005, as a free mixtape. In 2006, Tinie gained a great deal of airplay on British music TV channel Channel U for his song "Tears", and later on gained more recognition for "Wifey". Later in the year, he collaborated on a track with grime artist Ultra and producers and songwriters Agent X. Many of his songs recorded with Aftershock between 2005 and 2006 were featured on the group's debut album Shock to the System (2007), which received support from BBC Radio 1Xtra DJs. He also released the mixtape Hood Economics Room 147: The 80 Minute Course in 2007 and left the group later that year, stating that he felt Aftershock didn't respect him as an artist and that it was time to move on.

Tinie, together with his former manager Dumi Oburota founded the independent label Disturbing London primarily as an outlet for Tinie's music, but with the idea of also signing other young artists. According to Dumi: "We wanted to have a platform to put out our music and there wasn't any Def Jam or Roc-A-Fella label equivalent in England. [Also] I wanted to create a major independent label with quality artists. I felt like the major labels had lost the passion for music." The activities of the label were initially largely funded by student loans and the proceeds from buying and selling cars. Disturbing London also produce a clothing range that Tinie wears and promotes.

When scout and music consultant Jade Richardson saw Tinie performing at the 2009 Wireless Festival she called Parlophone Records president Miles Leonard saying: "You've got to check out this guy Tinie Tempah. He came on at lunchtime and there's about 1,000 kids screaming for him. He's only put out one independent release and he's got this huge audience." Leonard and A&R Nathan Thompson visited Tinie and his former manager Dumi at their studio a few weeks later and were hugely impressed to hear about the work they had already done in developing Tinie's career and by the ambitious plans they had for his future. Leonard told HitQuarters: "I thought it was incredible that an artist and former manager were doing so much so soon with so little... That impressed as much as the music." Tinie announced his signing to Parlophone in October 2009 by running a competition on his blog, with the winner invited to high tea at Claridges to celebrate the deal.

A major break came when Sony launched its PlayStation Portable and used a track featuring Yasmin and DJ Ironik, and "Atlantic/Warner" for the futuristic Wipeout Pure. This resulted in a promotional European tour alongside the likes of Sway and Dizzee Rascal.

=== 2009–2011: Success and Disc-Overy ===
Tinie released his debut single "Pass Out" through Parlophone on 28 February 2010. It entered the UK Singles Chart at number 1, having sold just over 92,000 copies in its first week, and sold sufficiently well to stay at the top spot for a second week. Tinie toured with Chipmunk in February 2010, going on to support Rihanna for four dates in May on her 10-date UK tour with Tinchy Stryder and Pixie Lott. Tinie performed at Radio 1 Big Weekend in Bangor on 22 May 2010 on the in New Music We Trust stage. He also toured with Mr Hudson in May 2010, as well as performing at many summer balls at various universities around the United Kingdom.

Tinie's second single "Frisky" was released on 6 June 2010, entering the UK Singles Chart at number 2. "Frisky" would later be used for a 2013 Bacardi commercial advertising their new pineapple flavor. Tinie played a host of festival dates throughout the summer, including the Summertime Ball at Wembley Stadium on 6 June 2010, at Wakestock in Abersoch on 3 July 2010, both T4 on the Beach and the Wireless Festival in London's Hyde Park on 4 July, and V Festival on 21 and 22 August 2010. He also had the honour of performing his first single "Pass Out" on 25 June 2010 at Glastonbury on the Pyramid stage with Snoop Dogg.

Tinie released his third single "Written in the Stars" on 19 September 2010. This again charted at number 1 in the UK Singles Chart, selling over 115,000 copies in its first week (his biggest-selling single to date), and charting in a number of other countries. "Written in the Stars" would go on to be used for a WrestleMania XXVII countdown promo during the WWE PPV Royal Rumble on 30 January 2011, and was later confirmed by WWE that it would be the official theme for Wrestlemania XXVII. It is also the theme song for the 2011 MLB Post Season, and was used as the entrance song for the New York Giants before Super Bowl XLVI.

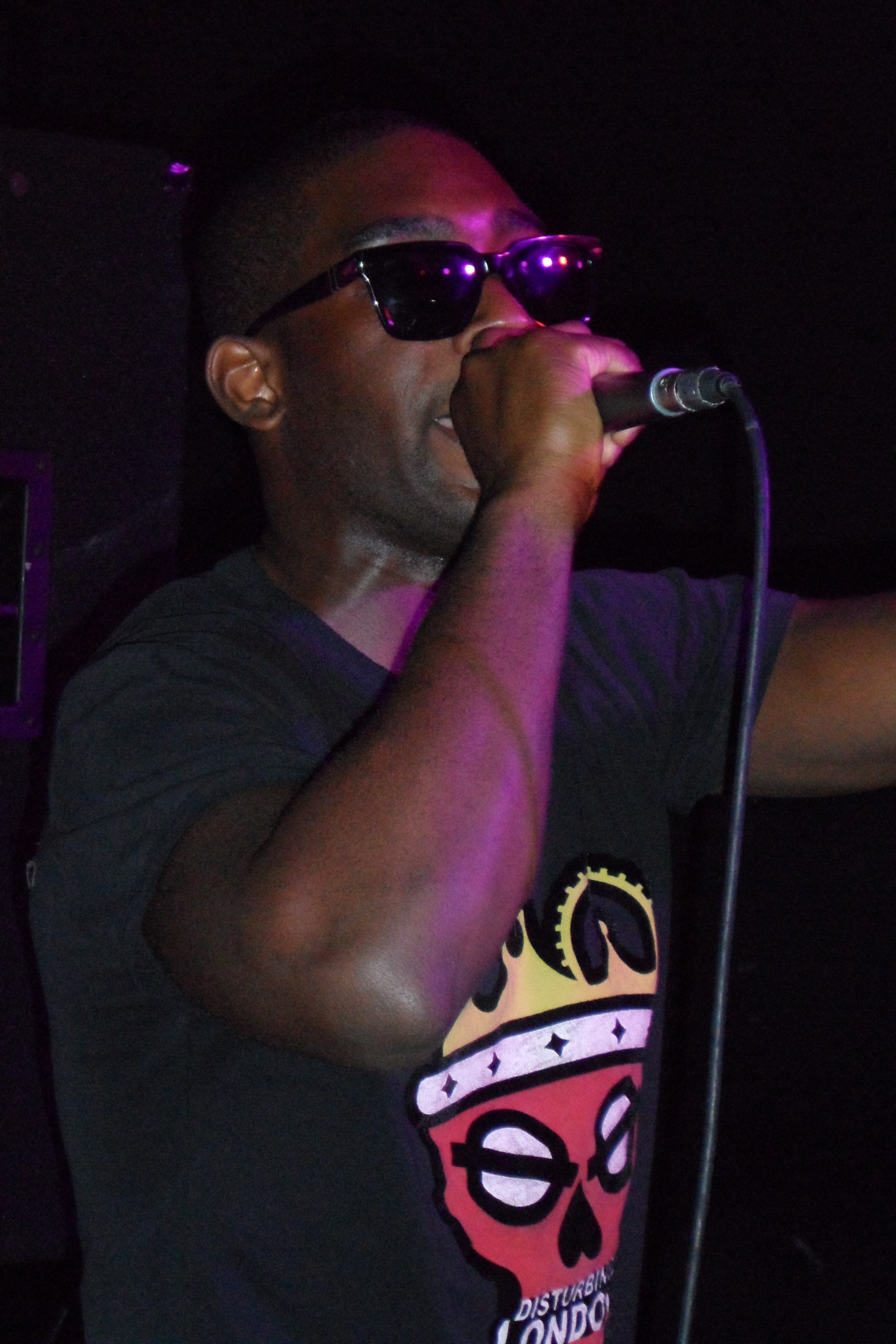
Tinie performing at WRONGBAR in Toronto, Canada in May 2011. Touring and promotion for Disc-Overy in North America pushed back the release of Tinie's second album to 2013.

Tinie teamed up with Swedish House Mafia for his fourth single "Miami 2 Ibiza", which was released on 1 October 2010. This reached a peak of number 4 in the UK Singles Chart and gave him his first number 1 in the Netherlands Mega Single Top 100 chart. Tinie's long-awaited debut album Disc-Overy was then released on 4 October 2010, featuring all his previous charted singles. On 11 October 2010, he kicked off his first UK tour which was supported by Chiddy Bang. In the same month, he was awarded his first 2 MOBO Awards. Tinie also featured on the Tinchy Stryder single "Game Over", which was released on 15 November 2010 and reached number 22 on the UK Singles Chart.

On 25 December, Tinie released his fifth single "Invincible" featuring Kelly Rowland, which peaked at number 11 on the UK Singles Chart. "Wonderman", featuring Ellie Goulding, was released and was the sixth official single. Tinie joined Usher on the European leg of his OMG Tour in January 2011.

Tinie was nominated for 4 Brit Awards making him the most nominated artist at the awards, and on 15 February 2011 he won his first ever Brit Award, for Best British Breakthrough Act, as well as a Brit for Best British Single.

On 7 March 2011, Tinie expressed his desire for his next album to go triple platinum. "I reckon in 2011, towards the end of it, I'm going to do an arena tour – and sell it out – then I reckon I'm going to release another album, and fingers crossed it can go platinum again, and double platinum, and triple. Let's just sell a million." In early 2011, Tinie announced a UK Arena tour, featuring support acts Nero, Labrinth and Chase & Status (After Party DJ Set).

In 2011, Labrinth revealed that Tinie would be releasing "Pass Out" in the United States, featuring a well recognised artist in the American rap game. He also served as a front act with Big Sean among others on Lupe Fiasco's Generation Lasers Tour. On 28 November 2011, Tinie hosted an episode of the TV show Never Mind the Buzzcocks. In the same month, Tinie would release two tracks, "Like It or Love It" which featured both Wretch 32 and J. Cole, and "Lucky Cunt" which featured Big Sean. On 16 December, Tinie released a 9-track mixtape/EP titled Happy Birthday, which went on to win best EP of 2011 at the Official Mixtape Awards 2012. In early 2012, Tinie featured with Eric Turner and Lupe Fiasco on a track called "Angels and Stars".

=== 2012–2014: Demonstration ===
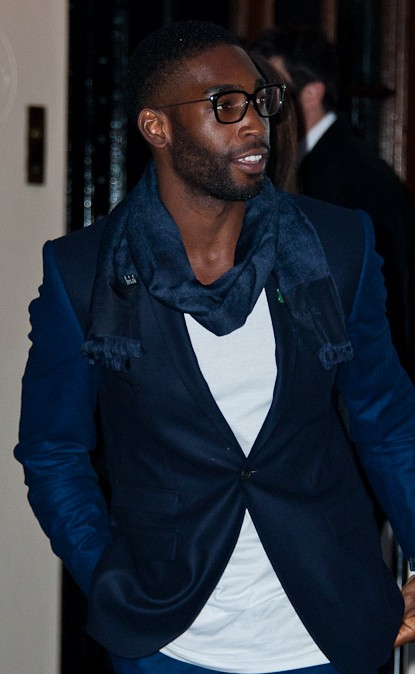
Tinie in 2014

By December 2010, Tinie was writing a second album, saying there would be a more electronic and live feel to it. It was originally intended for a late 2011 release. During an interview, Tinie said of his second album: "I always like to work with different people on each project I do, just so you get a different sound and angle. I will be working with some of the same people I did for the first album, you know what they say 'if it ain't broke then don't try and fix it'." Tinie had hoped to collaborate with other artists such as Toronto's Drake, and Adele. At the Brit Awards in 2012, he announced that his second album would be called Demonstration. On 24 June 2012, Tinie performed at Radio 1's Hackney Weekend on the main stage, playing two of his newest songs: "Mosh Pit", and "Drinking from the Bottle", on which he features alongside Calvin Harris as lead artist and which also appears on Harris' new album 18 Months. On 12 August, Tinie performed at the closing ceremony of the 2012 Summer Olympics in London.

The lead single from Demonstration, "Trampoline", was premiered on MistaJam's BBC Radio 1Xtra show on 2 July 2013, and the lyric video was premiered shortly afterwards. It features 2 Chainz and was produced by Diplo, and was released on 4 August 2013 in the United Kingdom, peaking at number 3 in the UK Singles Chart. In the interview with MistaJam, Tinie cites Dizzee Rascal and So Solid Crew as influences for the album, who've influenced him since his childhood. In interviews, Tinie and other artists have announced that they were working together on his album such as Labrinth, Dizzee Rascal, Ellie Goulding, Big Sean and Emeli Sandé.

The next single from the album, "Children of the Sun", featuring John Martin, was produced by iSHi and was premiered on Zane Lowe's BBC Radio 1 show on 12 September. It was released on 28 October in the United Kingdom and charted at number 6 in the UK. On 16 September, to promote his forthcoming UK arena tour, the album track "Don't Sell Out" live at the O2 Arena was uploaded to O2's YouTube channel. Tinie performed at Keele University on 8 October in a surprise event. On 19 October 2013, Tinie was awarded "Best UK Hip Hop/Grime Act" at the MOBO Awards' 18th Anniversary.

The album, Demonstration, was released on 4 November 2013, entering the UK Albums Chart at number three. Demonstration also debuted at number twenty-two on the Australian album charts and number forty on the New Zealand album charts. Tinie announced a third single, featuring Labrinth, entitled "Lover Not A Fighter", to be released in February 2014. In April, Tinie released the music video to Demonstration's fourth single, "5 Minutes". The song was produced by BBC Radio 1 DJ Zane Lowe, and was engineered by Rob Swire.

Tinie features on a vocal remix of the 2013 DVBBS and Borgeous instrumental EDM hit "Tsunami", retitled "Tsunami (Jump)", which was released through Ministry of Sound in 2014 and topped the UK Singles Chart. Tinie also features on Cheryl Cole's comeback track "Crazy Stupid Love", which went straight to Number 1, giving him his fifth Number 1 single. Tinie followed Cole to the judges' houses on The X Factor airing in October the same year. During his stint in Dunedin for the University of Otago Orientation Week, Tinie performed both on the stage and in the bedroom at a Castle Street flat.

=== 2015–present: Youth, television and new music ===
On 21 June 2015, Tinie released the first single from his upcoming third studio album, "Not Letting Go", which features fellow British artist Jess Glynne. To promote the single, he performed it with Sasha Keable on The Graham Norton Show on 19 June as Glynne was unavailable due to her having vocal surgery shortly before. The single charted at number 1 in the UK on 28 June 2015, gifting Tinie his sixth number one single. However, on the week of 23 October 2015, Tinie earned his seventh UK number one single with "Turn the Music Louder (Rumble)", a song by KDA, which also features English singer-songwriter Katy B. On 14 December 2015, Tinie released the mixtape Junk Food, with collaborations from a large number of British artists.

"Girls Like" featuring Zara Larsson was the second single from Youth, released in May 2016. The single peaked at number five on the UK Official Charts, later being certified Platinum.

"Text from Your Ex" featuring Tinashe was the third single released from Youth, charting at number 23 on the UK Official Charts. The album was released on 14 April 2017 by Parlophone and Disturbing London Records. The album debuted at number 9 on the UK Official Charts, gifting Tinie his third top ten album. The album would exit the UK Albums Chart after three weeks.

In a 2020 episode of The Big Narstie Show, Tinie Tempah changed his stage name to Tinie.

In September 2021, Tempah released the single "Love Me Like This" featuring vocalist Maia Wright. The track interpolates "Do You Really Like It?" as performed by DJ Pied Piper and the Masters of Ceremonies. On 12 May 2023, Tempah released the single "How You Samba" alongside Kris Kross Amsterdam and Mexican singer Sofía Reyes.

On 18 July 2025, Tempah released the single "Eat It Up", in collaboration with Skepsis. On 22 July 2025, he performed a medley of his hits, plus "Eat it Up", on ITV1's dating reality television show Love Island. On 26 September 2025, he released the single "Closer". He followed this release with the single "Energy", featuring singer Alex Mills, on 14 November 2025. On 18 November 2025, Tempah performed a homecoming concert at Koko, London.

On 23 January 2026, Tempah appeared on The Graham Norton Show, performing "Energy". On 13 March 2026, he released the single "Living Life", which features Daecolm.

== Disturbing London ==
In 2006, Tinie founded the independent record label Disturbing London.

== Other ==
Tinie is also a prominent figure in modern British fashion. In 2012, he was named best dressed man in GQ's Men of the Year Awards.

In 2015, he was chosen as the new men ambassador for London Menswear Collections, replacing Nick Grimshaw, and was named one of GQ's 50 best dressed British men. In October 2015, Tinie became a team captain for Sky 1's music/comedy panel show Bring the Noise alongside pop star Nicole Scherzinger.

In 2016, he appeared on the British programme Top Gear, along with Seasick Steve and Sharleen Spiteri in a South African SUV challenge. In 2017 he launched his fashion label What We Wear at London Fashion Week Men's and streamed the show on YouTube. Same year, Tinie welcomed guests at his pop-up store launch at the Protein Studio in Shoreditch, London.

In 2020, Tempah appeared in a Channel 4 documentary, The Talk, which aired on 4 August 2020. The documentary, produced by Whisper TV, is about Black Britons sharing their experiences of the conversations parents have to help their children face racism. The documentary also featured Emeli Sande, Rochelle and Marvin Humes, Ade Adepitan, Ashley and Jordan Banjo, Gary Younge, Lennie James and more

In June 2021, Tempah took part in a week-long NFT art residency at the Grand Hôtel du Cap-Ferrat in the French Riviera, alongside painter Sassan Behnam-Bakhtiar and digital artist Vector Meldrew, curated by Kamiar Maleki and moderated by auctioneer Simon de Pury.

In October 2021, Tempah presented the four-part Channel Four documentary Outrageous Extraordinary Extensions.

In 2022 he presented the first two series, of six episodes each, of the BBC Arts series Extraordinary Portraits.

In 2023, Tempah co-presented with Naomi Schiff the four-part Channel 4 motoring series Bangers: Mad for Cars.

In 2026, Tempah appeared as a guest investor on the BBC television programme Dragons' Den.

In 2026, Tempah performed during half time at the Sidemen Charity Match in Wembley.

== Personal life ==
Tinie is a Catholic. He said: "I definitely believe in God. I pray as much as possible. I think it's imperative to have faith or religion, because it's good to have morals, to be kind to others".

In Cirencester on 4 July 2019 he married Eve De Haan, daughter of Sir Roger De Haan, former owner of Saga plc, and Mauritian-born Marie Lyvie Goder. They have two daughters, born in 2018 and 2021.

Tinie is a supporter of Arsenal F.C. and the Labour Party.

Tinie is a blue belt in Brazilian jiu-jitsu and has competed in the sport. In 2023, he won the English BJJ Open in the Master 1 blue belt lightweight division.

== Discography ==
Studio albums

- Disc-Overy (2010)
- Demonstration (2013)
- Youth (2017)
- The Night's Not Dead (2026)

== Concert tours ==
Main act

- The Disc-Overy Tour (2011)
- Demonstration Tour (2014)
- Youth World Tour (2017)

Supporting act

- Rihanna – Last Girl on Earth Tour – United Kingdom Leg (2010)
- Usher – OMG Tour – European Leg (2011)
- The Script – No Sound Without Silence Tour – European Leg (2015)

== Awards and nominations ==
Year	Event	Prize	Nominated work	Result	Ref
2010	MOBO Awards	Best Newcomer		Won	
2010	MOBO Awards	Best Video	"Frisky" (featuring Labrinth)	Won	
2010	MOBO Awards	Best UK Act		Nominated	
2010	MOBO Awards	Best Song	"Pass Out"	Nominated	
2010	4Music Video Honours	Hottest Boy		Nominated	
2010	4Music Video Honours	Hottest Hook-up	"Frisky" (featuring Labrinth)	Nominated	
2010	MP3 Music Awards	The UGG Award (Urban/Garage/Grime)		Won	
2010	Urban Music Awards	Best Newcomer		Won	
2010	Urban Music Awards	Best Video	"Wonderman" (featuring Ellie Goulding)	Nominated	
2010	Urban Music Awards	Best Hip-Hop Act		Won	
2010	Urban Music Awards	Best Collaboration	"Pass Out"	Won	
2010	BT Digital Music Awards	Breakthrough Artist of the Year		Nominated	
2010	BT Digital Music Awards	Best Male Artist		Nominated	
2010	BT Digital Music Awards	Best Newcomer		Won	
2010	BT Digital Music Awards	Best Video	"Pass Out"	Nominated	
2010	BT Digital Music Awards	Best Song	"Pass Out"	Nominated	
2010	UK Festival Awards	Breakthrough Artist		Won	
2010	MTV Europe Music Awards	Best UK and Ireland New Act		Nominated	
2011	South Bank Awards	Pop Music	Disc-Overy	Nominated	
2011	Brit Awards	Best British Male		Nominated	
2011	Brit Awards	Best Breakthrough Act		Won	
2011	Brit Awards	Best Single	"Pass Out"	Won	
2011	Brit Awards	Album of the Year	Disc-Overy	Nominated	
2011	Ivor Novello Awards	Best Contemporary Song	"Pass Out"	Won	
2011	BET Awards	Best International Act: UK		Won	
2011	MOBO Awards	Best UK Hip Hop/Grime Act		Won	
2011	MOBO Awards	Best Album	Disc-Overy	Nominated	
2011	MOBO Awards	Best Song	"Hitz" (Chase & Status featuring Tinie Tempah)	Nominated	
2011	MOBO Awards	Best Song	"Wonderman" (featuring Ellie Goulding)	Nominated	
2011	MOBO Awards	Best UK Act		Nominated	
2011	Mercury Prize	Album of the Year	Disc-Overy	Nominated	
2012	Nigeria Entertainment Awards	Best International Artist		Won	
2013	Brit Awards	British Single of the Year	"R.I.P." (Rita Ora featuring Tinie Tempah)	Nominated	
2013	MOBO Awards	Best UK Hip Hop/Grime Act		Won	
2014	BET Awards	Best International Act: UK		Nominated	
2015	MOBO Awards	Best Song	"Not Letting Go"	Nominated	
2017	Brit Awards	British Single of the Year	"Girls Like" (featuring Zara Larsson)	Nominated	
2017	Brit Awards	British Video	"Girls Like" (featuring Zara Larsson)	Nominated	
2026	HollyShorts Film Festival	Music Visionary Award		Won	
