= List of UK Country Albums Chart number ones of 2010 =

These are the Official Charts Company's UK Country Albums Chart number ones of 2010. The chart week runs from Friday to Thursday with the chart-date given as the following Thursday. Chart positions are based the multi-metric consumption of country music in the United Kingdom, blending traditional album sales, track equivalent albums, and streaming equivalent albums. The chart contains 20 positions.

In the iteration of the chart dated 3 January, Taylor Swift's Fearless spends its thirty fourth week at number one, and held the top spot for seven consecutive weeks before being displaced by American VI: Ain't No Grave, a posthumous release by Johnny Cash which then spent four weeks at the chart peak. Swift then returned to number one for another five weeks. Following its release, Lady Antebellum's Need You Now debuted atop the chart on 9 May and remained there for twenty six weeks. The band also spent two weeks at number one later in the year when their self-titled debut album returned to the chart. Mary Chapin Carpenter's The Age of Miracles spent four non-consecutive weeks at the chart peak, her third UK number one. Jakob Dylan, Keith Urban, and Crystal Bowersox each spent one week at the top spot with Women + Country, Get Closer, and Farmer's Daughter respectively. The final chart topper of the year was The Age of Miracles.

== Chart history ==
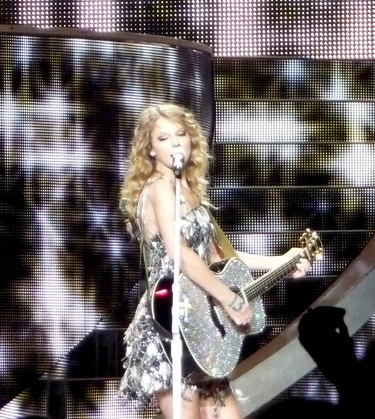
Taylor Swift held the top spot for thirteen weeks with her sophomore album Fearless.

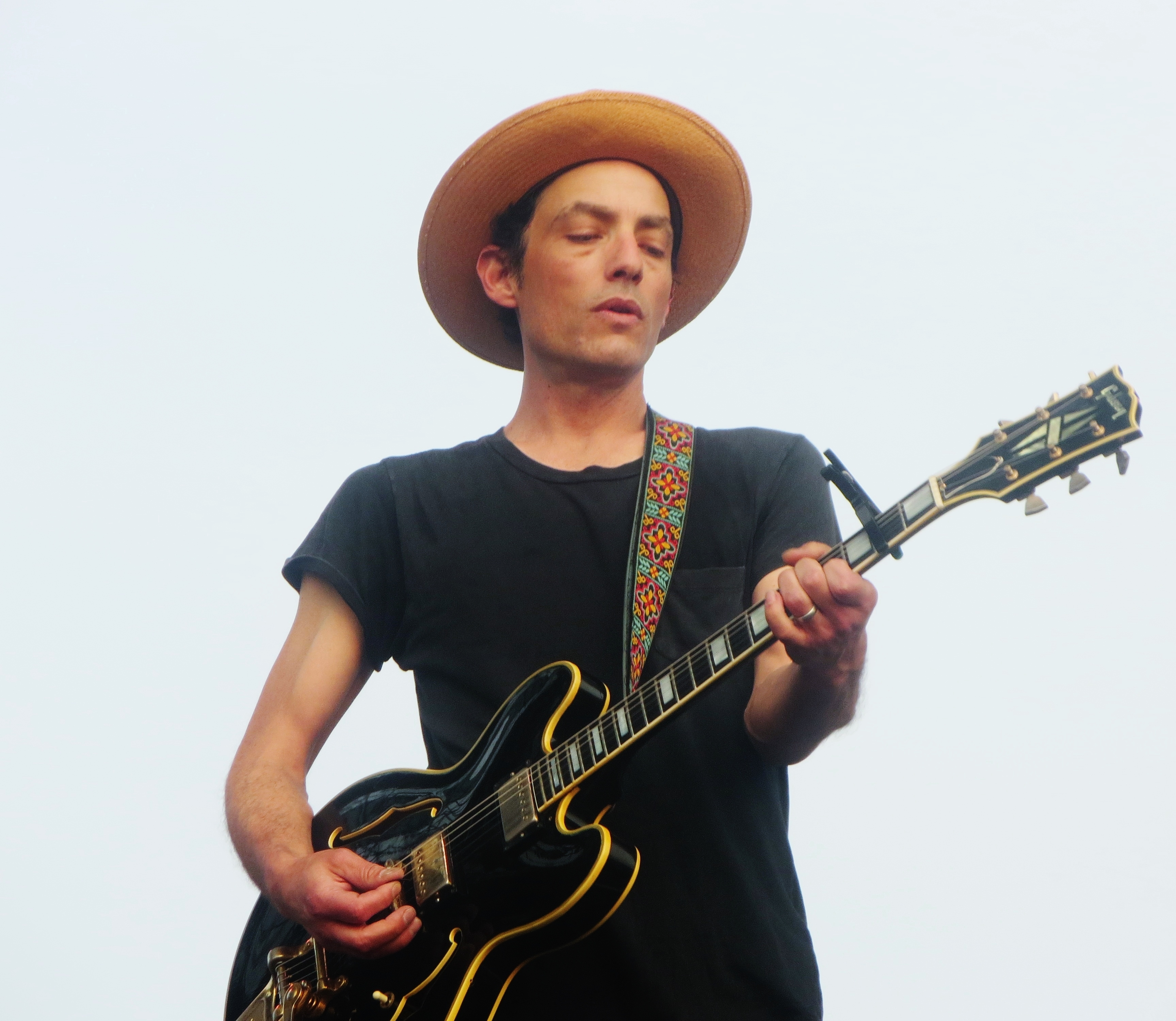
Jakob Dylan earned his first UK number one with Women + Country.

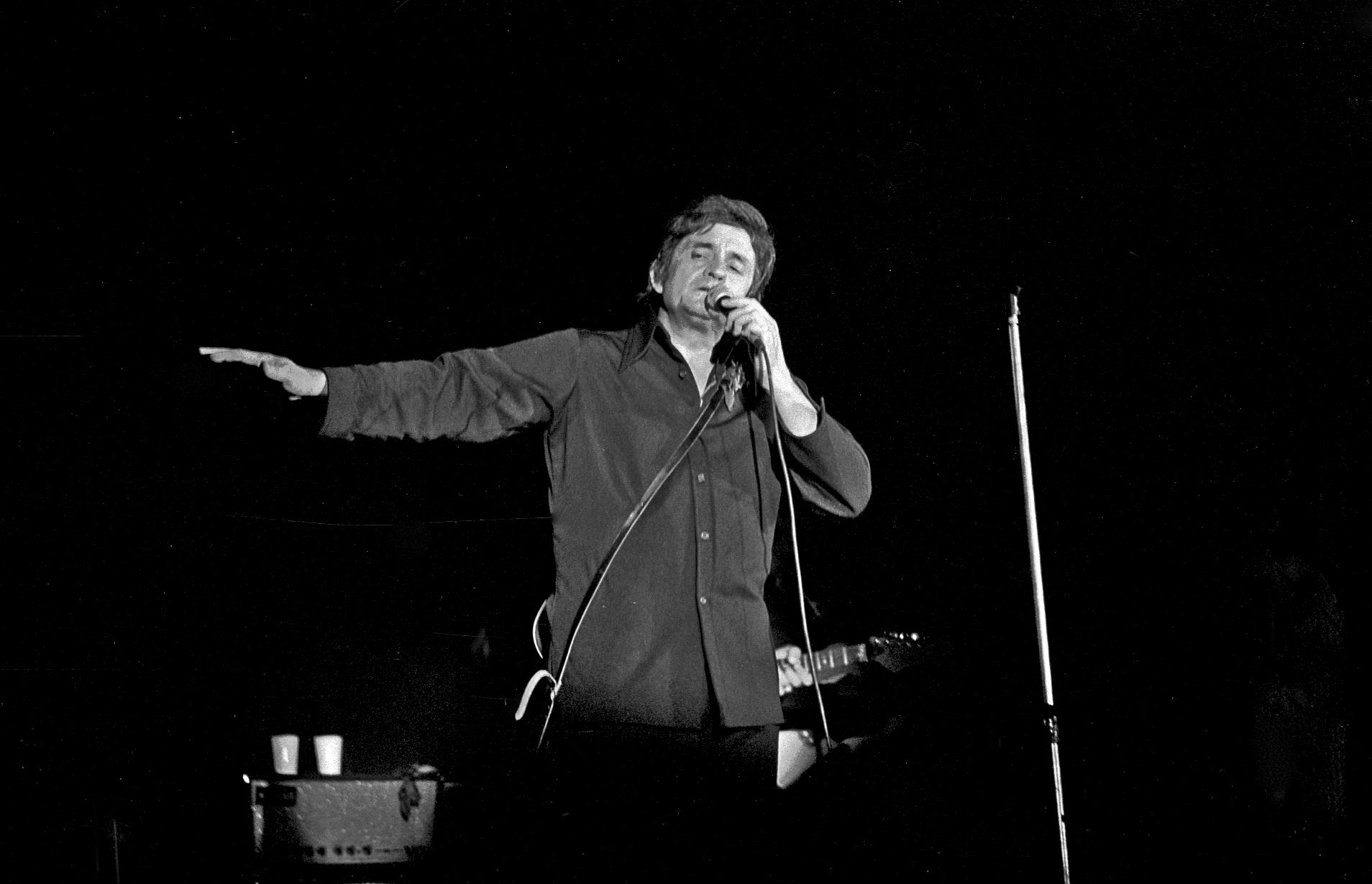
American VI: Ain't No Grave by Johnny Cash held at the chart peak for four consecutive weeks.

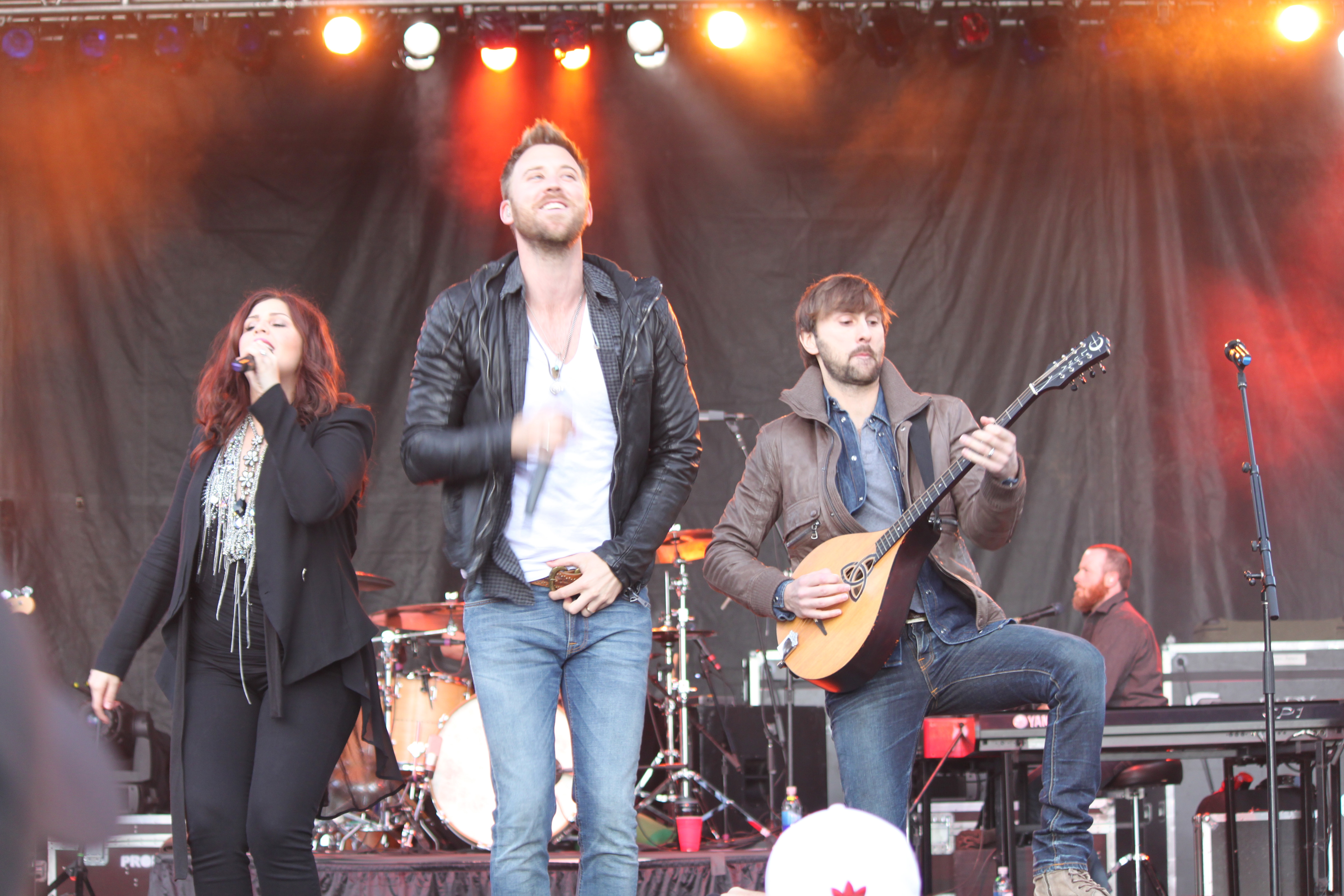
Lady Antebellum spent twenty eight weeks at number one with Need You Now.

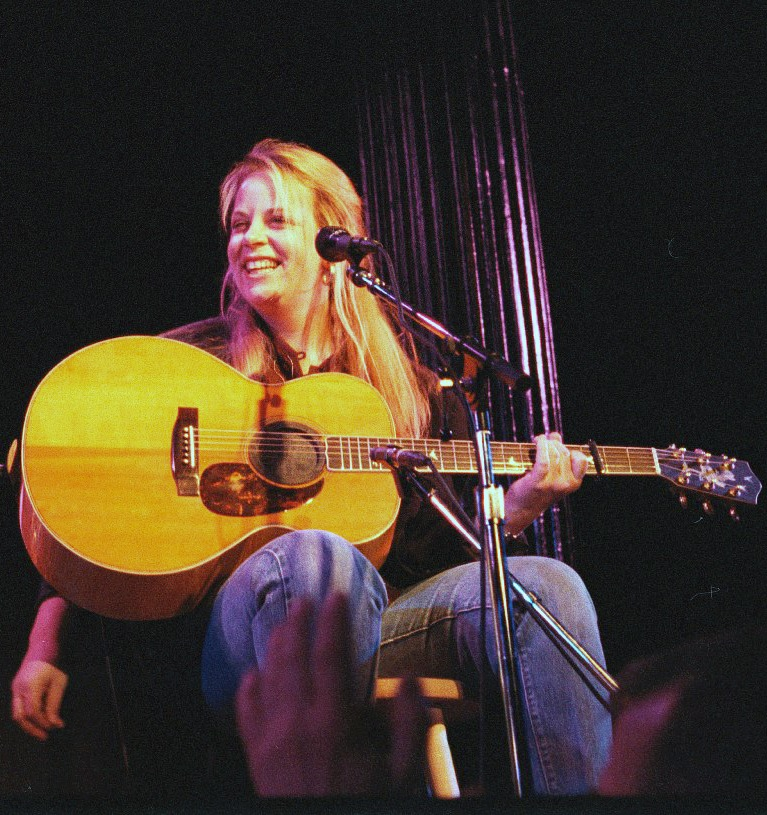
Mary Chapin Carpenter's The Age of Miracles was number one for four nonconsecutive weeks.

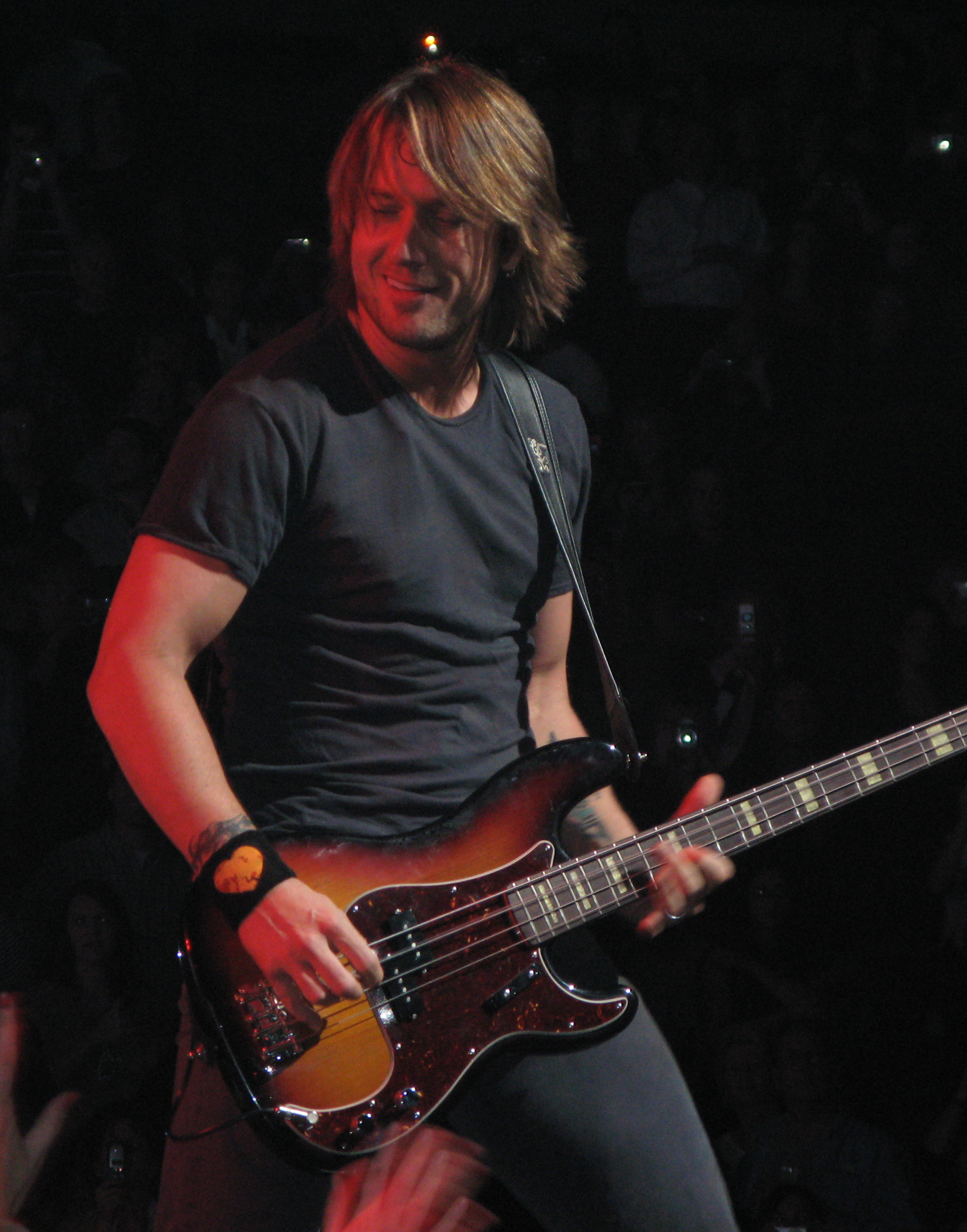
Get Closer by Keith Urban became his third UK number one.

Issue date	Album	Artist(s)	Record label	Ref.
3 January	Fearless	Taylor Swift	Mercury	
10 January	Fearless	Taylor Swift	Mercury	
17 January	Fearless	Taylor Swift	Mercury	
24 January	Fearless	Taylor Swift	Mercury	
31 January	Fearless	Taylor Swift	Mercury	
7 February	Fearless	Taylor Swift	Mercury	
14 February	Fearless	Taylor Swift	Mercury	
21 February	Fearless	Taylor Swift	Mercury	
28 February	American VI: Ain't No Grave	Johnny Cash	American/Lost Highway	
7 March	American VI: Ain't No Grave	Johnny Cash	American/Lost Highway	
14 March	American VI: Ain't No Grave	Johnny Cash	American/Lost Highway	
21 March	American VI: Ain't No Grave	Johnny Cash	American/Lost Highway	
28 March	Fearless	Taylor Swift	Mercury	
4 April	Fearless	Taylor Swift	Mercury	
11 April	Fearless	Taylor Swift	Mercury	
18 April	Fearless	Taylor Swift	Mercury	
25 April	Fearless	Taylor Swift	Mercury	
2 May	Women + Country	Jakob Dylan	Columbia	
9 May	Need You Now	Lady Antebellum	Captiol	
16 May	Need You Now	Lady Antebellum	Captiol	
23 May	Need You Now	Lady Antebellum	Captiol	
30 May	Need You Now	Lady Antebellum	Captiol	
6 June	Need You Now	Lady Antebellum	Captiol	
13 June	Need You Now	Lady Antebellum	Captiol	
20 June	Need You Now	Lady Antebellum	Captiol	
27 June	Need You Now	Lady Antebellum	Captiol	
4 July	Need You Now	Lady Antebellum	Captiol	
11 July	Need You Now	Lady Antebellum	Captiol	
18 July	Need You Now	Lady Antebellum	Captiol	
25 July	Need You Now	Lady Antebellum	Captiol	
1 August	Need You Now	Lady Antebellum	Captiol	
8 August	Need You Now	Lady Antebellum	Captiol	
15 August	Need You Now	Lady Antebellum	Captiol	
22 August	Need You Now	Lady Antebellum	Captiol	
29 August	Need You Now	Lady Antebellum	Captiol	
5 September	Need You Now	Lady Antebellum	Captiol	
12 September	Need You Now	Lady Antebellum	Captiol	
19 September	Need You Now	Lady Antebellum	Captiol	
26 September	Need You Now	Lady Antebellum	Captiol	
3 October	Need You Now	Lady Antebellum	Captiol	
10 October	Need You Now	Lady Antebellum	Captiol	
17 October	Need You Now	Lady Antebellum	Captiol	
24 October	Need You Now	Lady Antebellum	Captiol	
31 October	Need You Now	Lady Antebellum	Captiol	
7 November	The Age of Miracles	Mary Chapin Carpenter	Decca/Rounder	
14 November	The Age of Miracles	Mary Chapin Carpenter	Decca/Rounder	
21 November	Get Closer	Keith Urban	Capitol	
28 November	The Age of Miracles	Mary Chapin Carpenter	Decca/Rounder	
5 December	Lady Antebellum	Lady Antebellum	Capitol	
12 December	Lady Antebellum	Lady Antebellum	Capitol	
19 December	Farmer's Daughter	Crystal Bowersox	19/Jive	
26 December	The Age of Miracles	Mary Chapin Carpenter	Decca/Rounder	

== Most weeks at number one ==
Weeks at number one	Artist
28	Lady Antebellum
13	Taylor Swift
4	Johnny Cash
4	Mary Chapin Carpenter

== See also ==
- List of UK Albums Chart number ones of 2010
- List of UK Dance Singles Chart number ones of 2010
- List of UK Album Downloads Chart number ones of 2010
- List of UK Independent Albums Chart number ones of 2010
- List of UK R&B Albums Chart number ones of 2010
- List of UK Rock & Metal Albums Chart number ones of 2010
- List of UK Compilation Chart number ones of the 2010s
