= List of UK Independent Singles Chart number ones of 2010 =

The UK Indie Chart is a weekly chart that ranks the biggest-selling singles that are released on independent record labels in the United Kingdom. The chart is compiled by the Official Charts Company, and is based on both physical and digital single sales. Nineteen different singles reached the number-one spot during 2010.

== Summary ==
Rapper Example's single "Kickstarts" currently holds the record for most weeks at number one.

"Kickstarts" by Example currently holds the record for most weeks spent at number one during 2010. It remained at the top for ten consecutive weeks from 20 June to 22 August and also peaked at number three on the UK Singles Chart. This marked Example's second number-one indie single, as previous single "Won't Go Quietly" had also reached the top spot on 7 February, where it had remained for four weeks. This brought Example's total to 14 weeks at number one.

During 2010, eleven acts earned their first indie number one, either as a lead or featured artist. They were: Sidney Samson, Wizard Sleeve, Example, Steve Aoki, Skepta, Fugative, Leeds United Team & Supporters, Katy B, Pepper & Piano, Emma's Imagination and Tim Berg.

Several singles returned to number one throughout 2010. The first was Sidney Samson's "Riverside (Let's Go)", which topped the chart first on 10 January and remained at the top for four consecutive weeks. The single returned to the top spot on 7 March for a single week and then for a third time on 2 May, bringing the total number of weeks at the peak to six. Skepta also returned to number one on 8 April for a single week after peaking on 21 March, where it spent two weeks at the top. On 29 August, Katy B's debut single "Katy On a Mission" topped the chart, spending a single week at the peak. The single then returned to number one on 12 September, where it stayed for two weeks. It then returned for a third time on 16 October, bringing its total to four weeks at the peak.

On 5 September 2010, Pepper & Piano reached number one on the chart. The duo featured on the first semi-final of the TV talent show, Must Be the Music. Two weeks later, Emma's Imagination, the ultimate winner of the competition, also topped the chart, which marked a second number-one single to come from the programme.

== Chart history ==
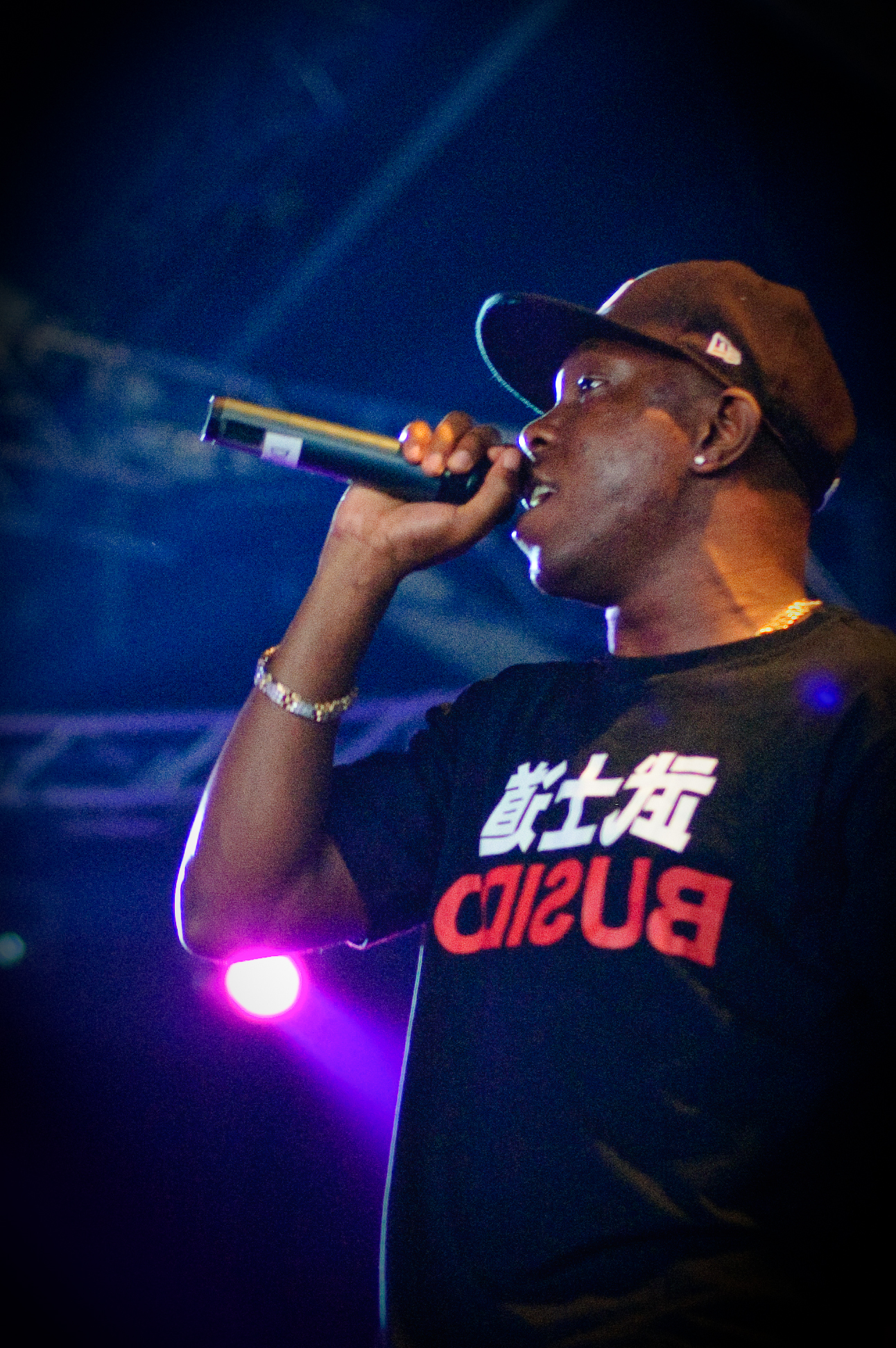
Dizzee Rascal earned his ninth indie number one with the single "Dirtee Disco".

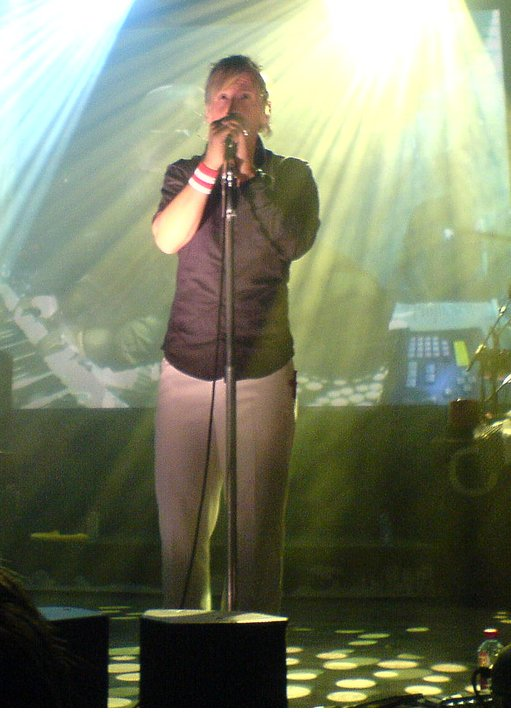
British band Delirious? topped the chart as a result of an online campaign.

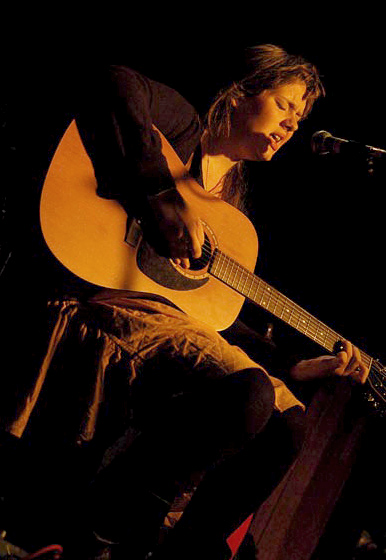
Singer Adele topped the chart after her cover of Bob Dylan's "Make You Feel My Love" was used in the seventh series of The X Factor.

Key
†	Best-selling indie single of the year

Issue Date	Song	Artist(s)	Ref.
3 January	"(Let the Bass Kick) In Miami Girl"	Chuckie & LMFAO	
10 January	"Riverside (Let's Go)" †	Sidney Samson featuring Wizard Sleeve	
17 January	"Riverside (Let's Go)" †	Sidney Samson featuring Wizard Sleeve	
24 January	"Riverside (Let's Go)" †	Sidney Samson featuring Wizard Sleeve	
31 January	"Riverside (Let's Go)" †	Sidney Samson featuring Wizard Sleeve	
7 February	"Won't Go Quietly"	Example	
14 February	"Won't Go Quietly"	Example	
21 February	"Won't Go Quietly"	Example	
28 February	"Won't Go Quietly"	Example	
7 March	"Riverside (Let's Go)" †	Sidney Samson featuring Wizard Sleeve	
14 March	"I'm in the House"	Steve Aoki featuring Zuper Blahq	
21 March	"Bad Boy"	Skepta	
28 March	"Bad Boy"	Skepta	
4 April	"History Maker"	Delirious?	
11 April	"Bad Boy"	Skepta	
18 April	"Heartbeat Song"	The Futureheads	
25 April	"Heartbeat Song"	The Futureheads	
2 May	"Riverside (Let's Go)" †	Sidney Samson featuring Wizard Sleeve	
9 May	"Not Going Home"	Faithless	
16 May	"Crush"	Fugative	
23 May	"Marching on Together"	Leeds United Team & Supporters	
30 May	"Dirtee Disco"	Dizzee Rascal	
6 June	"Dirtee Disco"	Dizzee Rascal	
13 June	"Dirtee Disco"	Dizzee Rascal	
20 June	"Kickstarts"	Example	
27 June	"Kickstarts"	Example	
4 July	"Kickstarts"	Example	
11 July	"Kickstarts"	Example	
18 July	"Kickstarts"	Example	
25 July	"Kickstarts"	Example	
1 August	"Kickstarts"	Example	
8 August	"Kickstarts"	Example	
15 August	"Kickstarts"	Example	
22 August	"Kickstarts"	Example	
29 August	"Katy on a Mission"	Katy B	
5 September	"You Took My Heart"	Pepper & Piano	
12 September	"Katy on a Mission"	Katy B	
19 September	"Katy on a Mission"	Katy B	
26 September	"Focus"	Emma's Imagination	
3 October	"Make You Feel My Love"	Adele	
10 October	"Make You Feel My Love"	Adele	
17 October	"Katy on a Mission"	Katy B	
24 October	"Make You Feel My Love"	Adele	
31 October	"Seek Bromance"	Tim Berg	
6 November	"Seek Bromance"	Tim Berg	
13 November	"Make You Feel My Love"	Adele	
21 November	"Make You Feel My Love"	Adele	
28 November	"Make You Feel My Love"	Adele	
5 December	"Make You Feel My Love"	Adele	
12 December	"Turn My Swag On"	Alexa Goddard	
19 December	"Surfin' Bird"	The Trashmen	
26 December	"Make You Feel My Love"	Adele	

== Year-end statistics ==
- Best-selling number-one indie single – "Riverside (Let's Go)" by Sidney Samson featuring Wizard Sleeve (384,000 single sales)
- Best-selling number-one indie artist – Example (708,000 single sales)
- Most weeks at number one (single, consecutive) – "Kickstarts" by Example (10 weeks)
- Most weeks at number one (single, non-consecutive) – "Make You Feel My Love" by Adele (8 weeks)
- Most weeks at number one (artist, consecutive) – Example (10 weeks)
- Most weeks at number one (artist, non-consecutive) – Example (14 weeks)

== Number-one artists ==
Position	Artist	Weeks at number one
1	Example	14
2	Adele	7
3	Sidney Samson	6
4	Katy B	4
5	Dizzee Rascal	3
5	Skepta	3
6	The Futureheads	2
6	Tim Berg	2
7	Alexa Goddard	1
7	Chuckie	1
7	Delirious?	1
7	Emma's Imagination	1
7	Faithless	1
7	Fugative	1
7	Leeds United F.C.	1
7	Pepper & Piano	1
7	Steve Aoki	1
7	The Trashmen	1

== See also ==
- List of number-one singles of 2010 (UK)
- List of UK Dance Chart number-one singles of 2010
- List of UK Indie Chart number-one albums of 2010
- List of UK Official Download Chart number-one singles of 2010
- List of UK Rock Chart number-one singles of 2010
- List of UK R&B Chart number-one singles of 2010
