= O.T.T (song) =

Single by Fugative
- Released: 6 January 2013
- Recorded: 2012
- Genre: Hip hop; electro-grime
- Length: 3:31
- Label: Runaway Recordings
- Songwriter: Harry Byart
- Producer: Fugative

Fugative singles chronology
| "Bad Girl" (2010) | "O.T.T" (2013) |

"O.T.T" is a single by British rapper Fugative. It was released on 6 January 2013 on digital download. The track was written and produced By Fugative; this is the first single Fugative has released in three years.

== Track listing ==
Digital download
| No. | Title | Length |
|---|---|---|
| 1. | "O.T.T" (Clean) | 3:31 |
| 2. | "O.T.T" (Explicit) | 3:31 |
| 3. | "O.T.T" (Runaway Remix) | 3:26 |
| 4. | "O.T.T" (Runaway Extended Remix) | 4:05 |

== Release history ==
| Region | Date | Format | Label |
|---|---|---|---|
| United Kingdom | 6 January 2013 | Digital download | Runaway Recordings |
