= List of UK Independent Albums Chart number ones of 2010 =

These are the Official Charts Company's UK Indie Chart number-one albums of 2010.

== Chart history ==
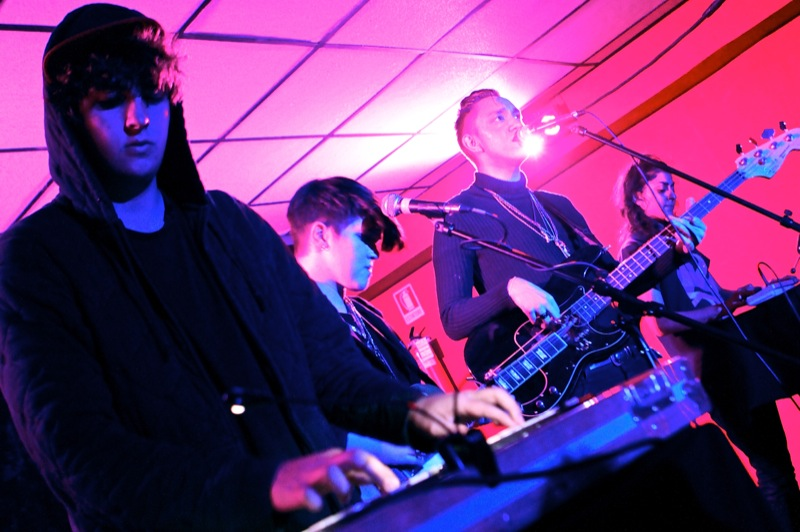
The xx spent fifteen weeks at the top of the chart with their debut album xx.

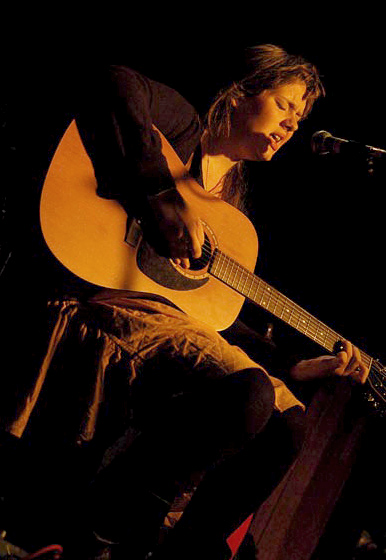
Adele's 2009 album 19 spent four weeks at number one at the end of this year.

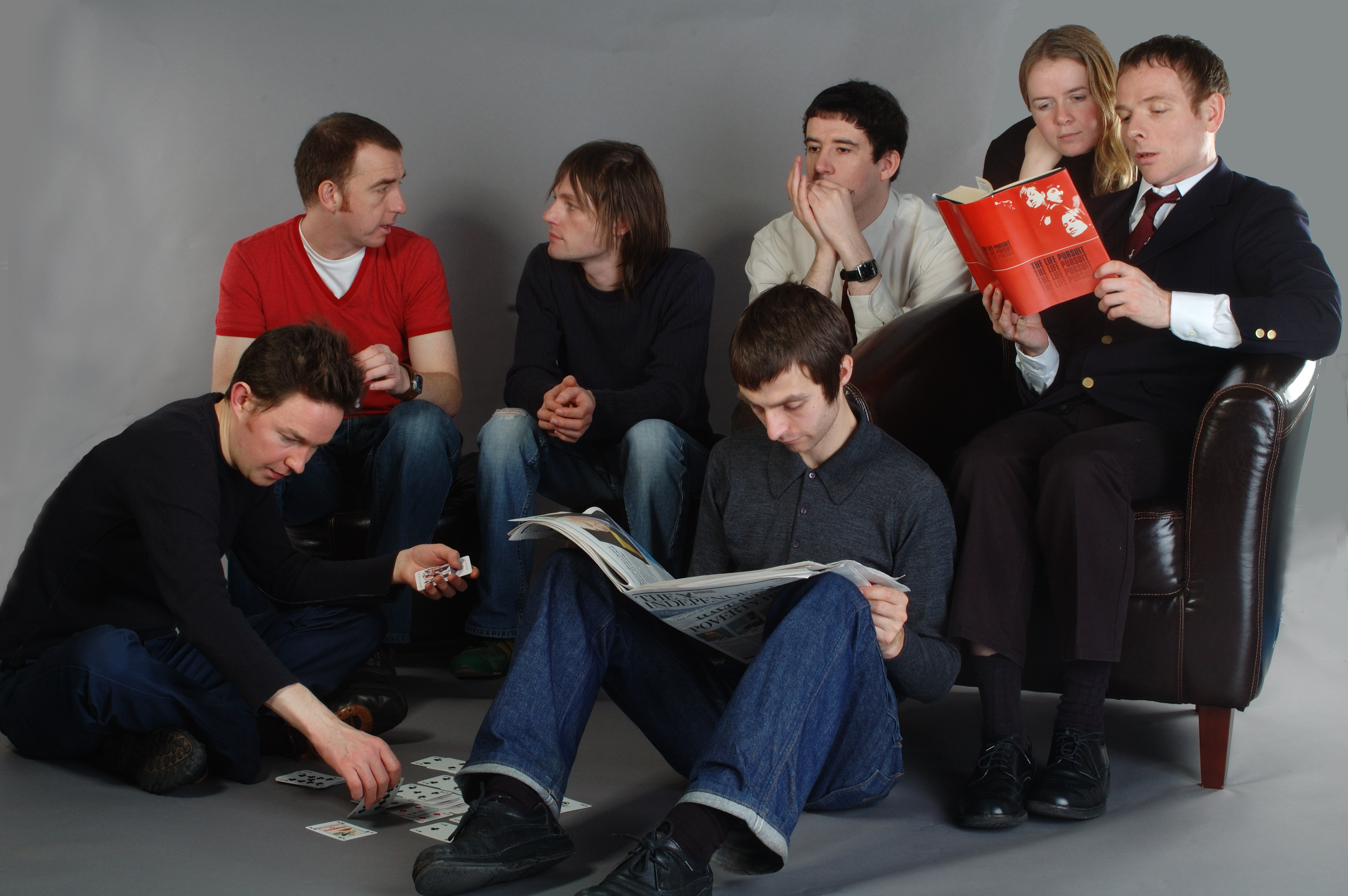
Belle & Sebastian topped the UK Indie Chart with Write About Love.

Example reached number one with his debut album Won't Go Quietly.

Key
†	Best-selling indie album of the year

Issue date	Album	Artist(s)	Record label	Ref.
3 January	Tongue n' Cheek	Dizzee Rascal	Dirtee Stank	
10 January	Conditions	The Temper Trap	Infectious	
17 January	Contra	Vampire Weekend	XL	
24 January	The Betrayed	Lostprophets	Visible Noise	
31 January	The Betrayed	Lostprophets	Visible Noise	
7 February	The Courage of Others	Midlake	Bella Union	
14 February	I'm New Here	Gil Scott-Heron	XL	
21 February	Tongue n' Cheek	Dizzee Rascal	Dirtee Stank	
28 February	Tongue n' Cheek	Dizzee Rascal	Dirtee Stank	
7 March	Songs of Love	Simply Red	simplyred.com	
14 March	Songs of Love	Simply Red	simplyred.com	
21 March	Under Great White Northern Lights	The White Stripes	Third Man	
28 March	Black Rock	Joe Bonamassa	Provogue	
4 April	Contra	Vampire Weekend	XL	
11 April	xx †	The xx	Young Turks	
18 April	xx †	The xx	Young Turks	
25 April	xx †	The xx	Young Turks	
2 May	Your Future Our Clutter	The Fall	Domino	
9 May	Heaven is Whenever	The Hold Steady	Rough Trade	
16 May	High Violet	The National	4AD	
23 May	The Dance	Faithless	Nate's Tunes	
30 May	The House	Katie Melua	Dramatico	
6 June	The House	Katie Melua	Dramatico	
13 June	The House	Katie Melua	Dramatico	
20 June	American Slang	The Gaslight Anthem	SideOneDummy	
27 June	Won't Go Quietly	Example	Data	
4 July	Won't Go Quietly	Example	Data	
11 July	Won't Go Quietly	Example	Data	
18 July	Won't Go Quietly	Example	Data	
25 July	xx †	The xx	Young Turks	
1 August	xx †	The xx	Young Turks	
8 August	xx †	The xx	Young Turks	
15 August	xx †	The xx	Young Turks	
22 August	xx †	The xx	Young Turks	
29 August	xx †	The xx	Young Turks	
5 September	xx †	The xx	Young Turks	
12 September	xx †	The xx	Young Turks	
19 September	xx †	The xx	Young Turks	
26 September	xx †	The xx	Young Turks	
3 October	xx †	The xx	Young Turks	
10 October	There Is a Hell Believe Me I've Seen It. There Is a Heaven Let's Keep It a Secret.	Bring Me the Horizon	Visible Noise	
17 October	Write About Love	Belle & Sebastian	Rough Trade	
24 October	Great British Songs	Ali Campbell	Jacaranda	
31 October	xx †	The xx	Young Turks	
7 November	Accelerate	Peter Andre	Conehead	
14 November	Accelerate	Peter Andre	Conehead	
21 November	19	Adele	XL	
28 November	O' Holy Night	Daniel O'Donnell	DMG TV	
5 December	O' Holy Night	Daniel O'Donnell	DMG TV	
12 December	19	Adele	XL	
19 December	19	Adele	XL	
26 December	19	Adele	XL	

== See also ==
- List of UK Albums Chart number ones of the 2010s
- List of UK Dance Albums Chart number ones of 2010
- List of UK Album Downloads Chart number ones of the 2010s
- List of UK Independent Singles Chart number ones of 2010
- List of UK Independent Singles Chart number ones of 2010
- List of UK R&B Albums Chart number ones of 2010
