= List of UK Dance Albums Chart number ones of 2010 =

These are the Official Charts Company's UK Dance Chart number-one albums of 2010. The dates listed in the menus below represent the Saturday after the Sunday the chart was announced, as per the way the dates are given in chart publications such as the ones produced by Billboard, Guinness, and Virgin.

== Chart history ==
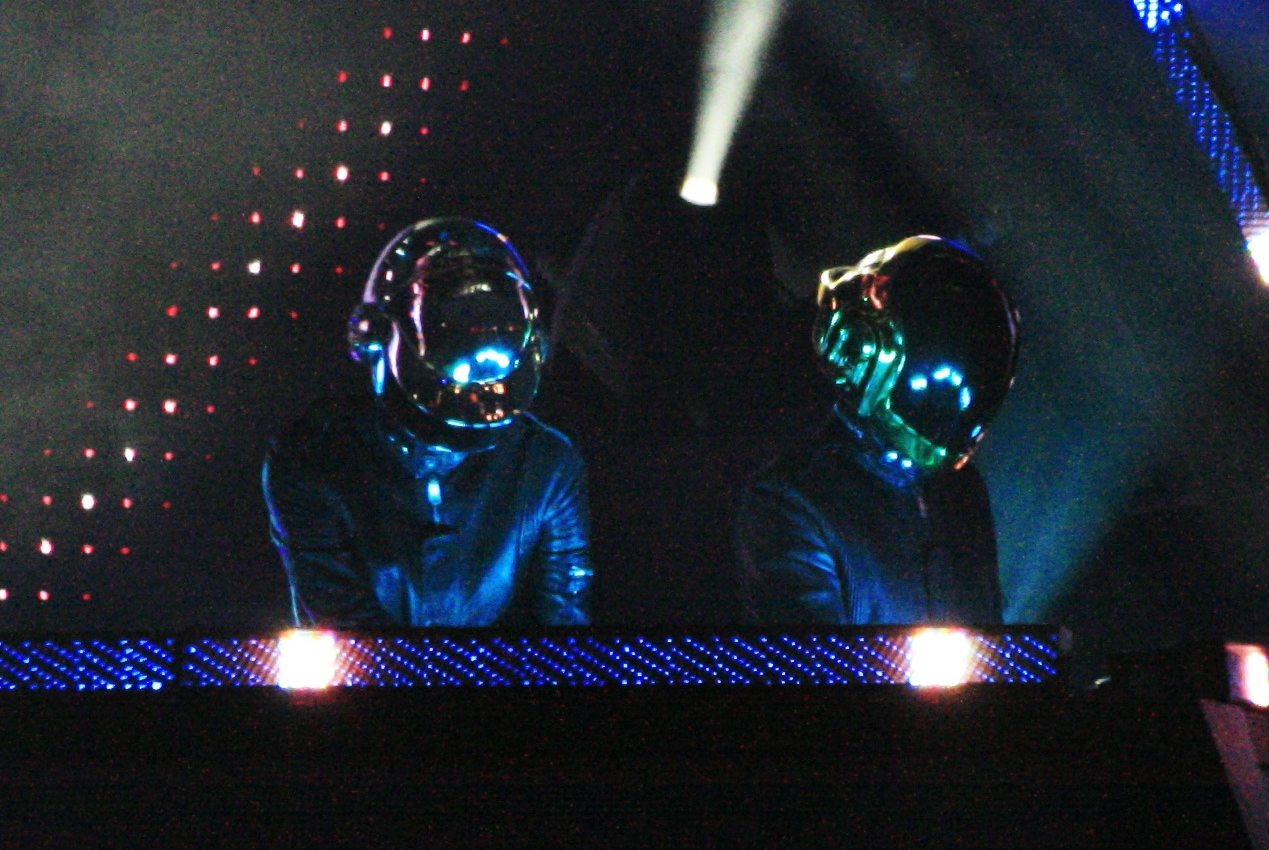
Daft Punk topped the UK Dance Chart for three weeks during 2010 with their soundtrack to the movie Tron: Legacy.

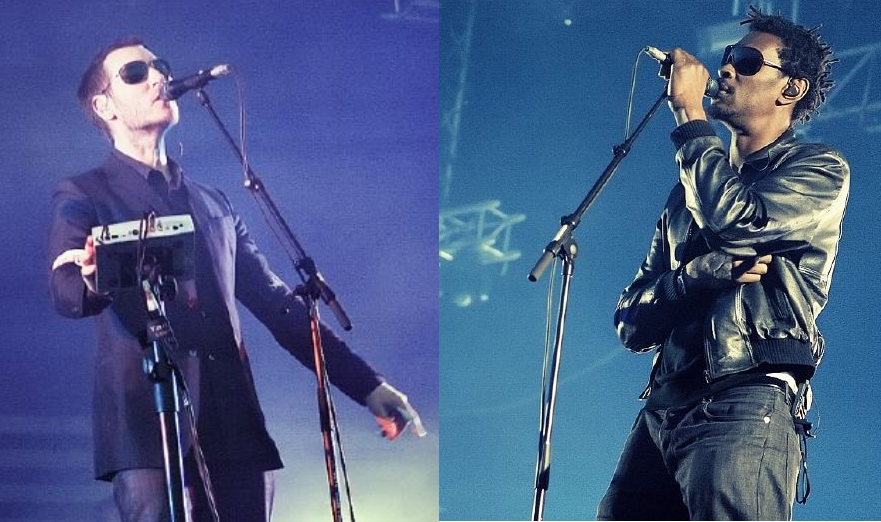
Massive Attack reached number one with their album Heligoland.

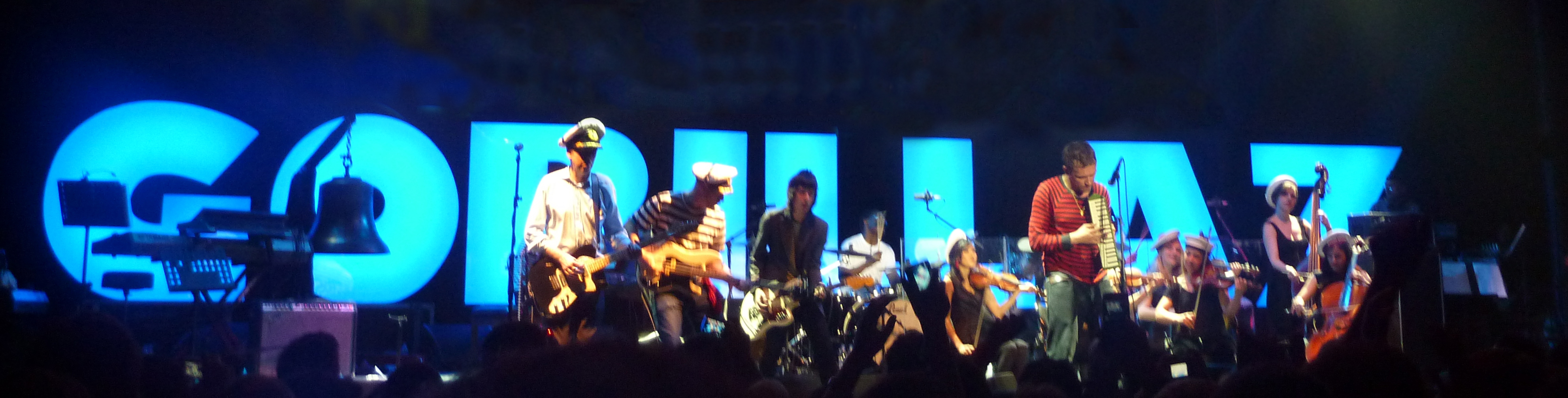
Gorillaz topped the UK Dance Chart with Plastic Beach.

Example reached number one with his second studio album Won't Go Quietly.

Issue date	Album	Artist(s)	Record label	Ref.
2 January	Ministry of Sound – One	Various Artists	Ministry of Sound	
9 January	One Love	David Guetta	Positiva/Virgin	
16 January	Want	3OH!3	Photo Finish	
23 January	Running Trax	Various artists	Ministry of Sound	
30 January	Running Trax	Various artists	Ministry of Sound	
6 February	Funky House Classics	Various artists	Ministry of Sound	
13 February	One Life Stand	Hot Chip	Parlophone	
20 February	Heligoland	Massive Attack	Virgin	
27 February	Heligoland	Massive Attack	Virgin	
6 March	Push It – Classic Party & Dance Tracks	Various artists	UMTV	
13 March	Black Light	Groove Armada	Cooking Vinyl	
20 March	Plastic Beach	Gorillaz	Parlophone	
27 March	Plastic Beach	Gorillaz	Parlophone	
3 April	Running Trax Xtra – 5k and 10k Edition	Various artists	Ministry of Sound	
10 April	Euphoria – A Decade of Trance Albums	Various artists	Ministry of Sound	
17 April	Euphoria – A Decade of Trance Albums	Various artists	Ministry of Sound	
24 April	Floorfillers – 90s Club Classics	Various artists	UMTV	
1 May	Clubland Smashed	Various artists	UMTV	
8 May	100 Chillout Classics	Various artists	Rhino	
15 May	100 Chillout Classics	Various artists	Rhino	
22 May	Where Did the Night Fall	Unkle	Surrender All	
29 May	The Dance	Faithless	Nate's Tunes	
5 June	Chilled Acoustic	Various artists	Ministry of Sound	
12 June	Chilled Acoustic	Various artists	Ministry of Sound	
19 June	Chilled Acoustic	Various artists	Ministry of Sound	
26 June	Chilled Acoustic	Various artists	Ministry of Sound	
3 July	Won't Go Quietly	Example	Data	
10 July	Clubland 17	Various artists	AATW/UMTV	
17 July	Clubland 17	Various artists	AATW/UMTV	
24 July	Club Anthems 2010	Various artists	EMI	
31 July	Gatecrasher Anthems – Paul van Dyk	Various artists	Rhino	
7 August	Big Tunes – Back to the 90s – Vol 2	Various artists	Ministry of Sound	
14 August	Planet Dance	Various artists	UMTV	
21 August	The Annual – 15 Years	Various artists	Ministry of Sound	
28 August	101 Ibiza Anthems	Various artists	EMI	
4 September	Hed Kandi – Ibiza 2010	Various artists	Hedkandi	
11 September	Hed Kandi – Ibiza 2010	Various artists	Hedkandi	
18 September	Drum & Bass Arena – Anthology	Various artists	Ministry of Sound	
25 September	The Mash Up Mix 2010	Various artists	Ministry of Sound	
2 October	The Mash Up Mix 2010	Various artists	Ministry of Sound	
9 October	Monster Floorfillers	Various artists	UMTV	
16 October	Monster Floorfillers	Various artists	UMTV	
23 October	Magnetic Man	Magnetic Man	Columbia	
30 October	Magnetic Man	Magnetic Man	Columbia	
6 November	Until One	Swedish House Mafia	Virgin	
13 November	The Annual 2011	Various artists	Ministry of Sound	
20 November	Clubland 18	Various artists	UMTV	
27 November	Clubland 18	Various artists	UMTV	
4 December	Superclub	Various artists	Rhino	
11 December	The Beginning	The Black Eyed Peas	Interscope	
18 December	Tron: Legacy	Daft Punk	Walt Disney	
25 December	Tron: Legacy	Daft Punk	Walt Disney	

== See also ==
- List of UK Albums Chart number ones of the 2010s
- List of UK Dance Singles Chart number ones of 2010
- List of UK Album Downloads Chart number ones of the 2010s
- List of UK Independent Singles Chart number ones of 2010
- List of UK Independent Singles Chart number ones of 2010
- List of UK R&B Albums Chart number ones of 2010
