= List of UK R&B Singles Chart number ones of 2010 =

This is a list of the Official Charts Company's UK R&B Chart number-one singles of 2010.

== Number ones ==
Key
†	Best-selling R&B single of the year

Issue date	Single	Artist(s)
9 January	"Meet Me Halfway"	The Black Eyed Peas
16 January	"Replay"	Iyaz
23 January	"Replay"	Iyaz
30 January	"Replay"	Iyaz
6 February	"Replay"	Iyaz
13 February	"Replay"	Iyaz
20 February	"Replay"	Iyaz
27 February	"Rude Boy"	Rihanna
6 March	"In My Head"	Jason Derülo
13 March	"Pass Out"	Tinie Tempah
20 March	"Pass Out"	Tinie Tempah
27 March	"Pass Out"	Tinie Tempah
3 April	"Pass Out"	Tinie Tempah
10 April	"She Said"	Plan B
17 April	"OMG"	Usher featuring will.i.am
24 April	"OMG"	Usher featuring will.i.am
1 May	"OMG"	Usher featuring will.i.am
8 May	"OMG"	Usher featuring will.i.am
15 May	"OMG"	Usher featuring will.i.am
22 May	"Ridin' Solo"	Jason Derülo
29 May	"Nothin' on You"	B.o.B featuring Bruno Mars
5 June	"Dirtee Disco"	Dizzee Rascal
12 June	"Nothin' on You"	B.o.B featuring Bruno Mars
19 June	"Frisky"	Tinie Tempah featuring Labrinth
26 June	"Wavin' Flag (The Celebration Mix)"	K'naan
3 July	"Wavin' Flag (The Celebration Mix)"	K'naan
10 July	"Airplanes"	B.o.B featuring Hayley Williams
17 July	"The Club Is Alive"	JLS
24 July	"Airplanes"	B.o.B featuring Hayley Williams
31 July	"Love the Way You Lie" †	Eminem featuring Rihanna
7 August	"Billionaire"	Travie McCoy featuring Bruno Mars
14 August	"Beautiful Monster"	Ne-Yo
21 August	"Love the Way You Lie" †	Eminem featuring Rihanna
28 August	"Green Light"	Roll Deep
4 September	"Dynamite"	Taio Cruz
11 September	"Dynamite"	Taio Cruz
18 September	"Dynamite"	Taio Cruz
25 September	"Dynamite"	Taio Cruz
2 October	"Dynamite"	Taio Cruz
9 October	"Written in the Stars"	Tinie Tempah featuring Eric Turner
16 October	"Forget You"	Cee Lo Green
23 October	"Forget You"	Cee Lo Green
30 October	"Forget You"	Cee Lo Green
6 November	"Forget You"	Cee Lo Green
13 November	"Forget You"	Cee Lo Green
20 November	"Forget You"	Cee Lo Green
27 November	"Like a G6"	Far East Movement featuring Cataracs and Dev
4 December	"Like a G6"	Far East Movement featuring Cataracs and Dev
11 December	"Like a G6"	Far East Movement featuring Cataracs and Dev
18 December	"Whip My Hair"	Willow Smith
25 December	"What's My Name"	Rihanna featuring Drake

== Number-one artists ==
Position	Artist	Weeks at number one
1	Cee Lo Green	6
1	Iyaz	6
1	Tinie Tempah	6
4	will.i.am	5
4	Taio Cruz	5
4	Usher	5
8	B.o.B	4
4	Rihanna	4
9	Bruno Mars	3
9	Far East Movement	3
11	K'Naan	2

== See also ==
- List of number-one singles of 2010 (UK)
- List of UK Dance Chart number-one singles of 2010
- List of UK Indie Chart number-one singles of 2010
- List of UK Official Download Chart number-one singles of 2010
- List of UK Rock Chart number-one singles of 2010
- List of UK R&B Chart number-one albums of 2010
