= List of UK Dance Singles Chart number ones of 2010 =

The UK Dance Chart is a chart that ranks the biggest-selling singles that are released through the genre of Dance in the United Kingdom. The chart is compiled by the Official Charts Company, and is based on both physical and digital single sales. The dates listed in the menus below represent the Saturday after the Sunday the chart was announced, as per the way the dates are given in chart publications such as the ones produced by Billboard, Guinness, and Virgin.

== Number-ones ==
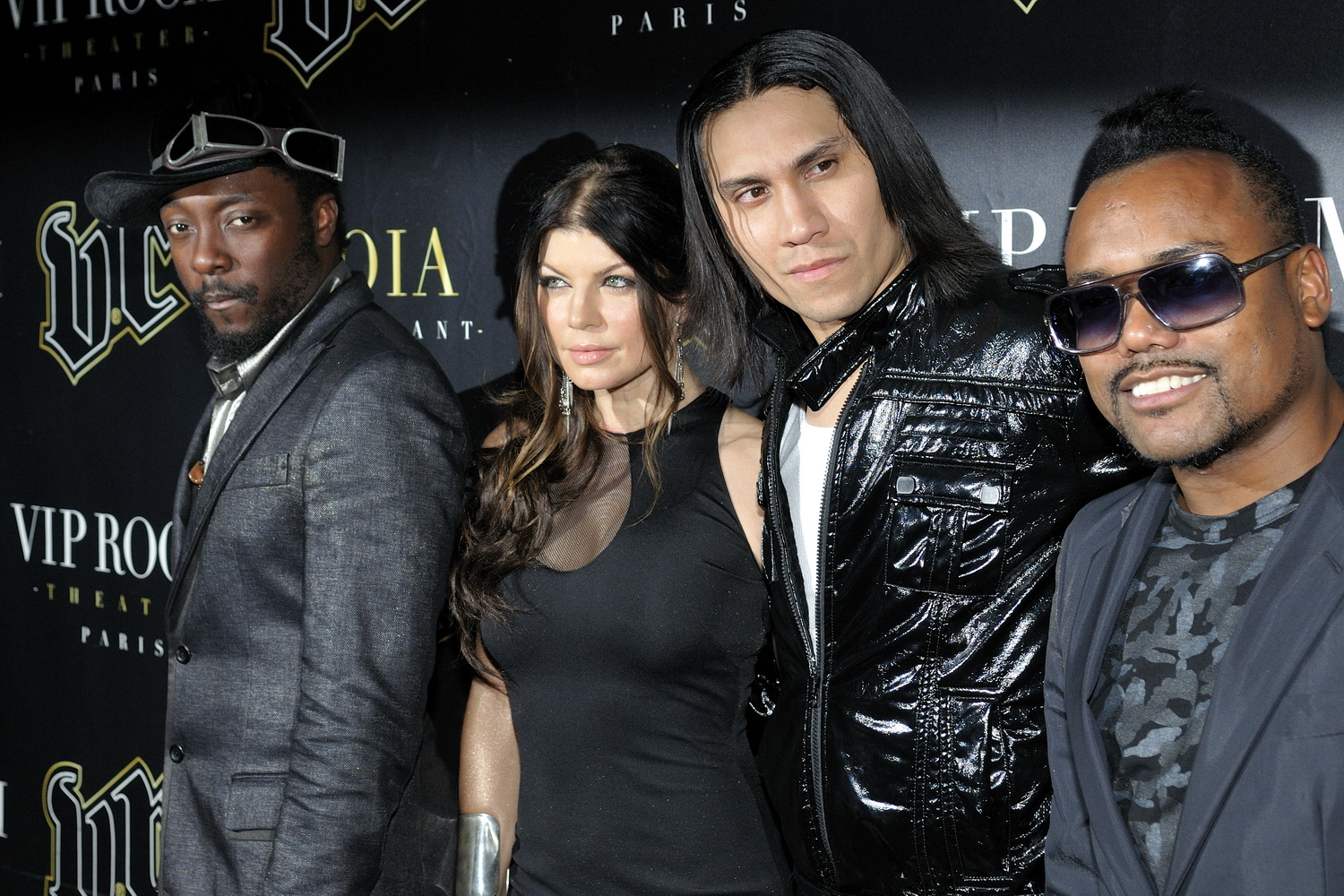
Hip Hop superstars The Black Eyed Peas hold the record for most weeks at number-one during 2010; having spent eight weeks at the peak, seven of which were with "The Time (Dirty Bit)".

Key
†	Best-selling dance single of the year

Issue date	Single	Artist	Ref.
2 January	"(Let the Bass Kick) In Miami"	Chuckie & LMFAO	
9 January	"(Let the Bass Kick) In Miami"	Chuckie & LMFAO	
16 January	"Riverside (Let's Go)"	Sidney Samson	
23 January	"Riverside (Let's Go)"	Sidney Samson	
30 January	"Riverside (Let's Go)"	Sidney Samson	
6 February	"Riverside (Let's Go)"	Sidney Samson	
13 February	"Won't Go Quietly"	Example	
20 February	"Won't Go Quietly"	Example	
27 February	"Won't Go Quietly"	Example	
6 March	"Won't Go Quietly"	Example	
13 March	"Why Don't You"	Gramophonedzie	
20 March	"Rock That Body"	The Black Eyed Peas	
27 March	"Hot"	Inna	
3 April	"Hot"	Inna	
10 April	"Hot"	Inna	
17 April	"Hot"	Inna	
24 April	"Acapella"	Kelis	
1 May	"Acapella"	Kelis	
8 May ^{[a]}	"Good Times"	Roll Deep	
15 May ^{[a]}	"Good Times"	Roll Deep	
22 May ^{[a]}	"Good Times"	Roll Deep	
29 May	"Good Times"	Roll Deep	
5 June	"Stereo Love"	Edward Maya featuring Vika Jigulina	
12 June ^{[a]}	"Gettin' Over You"	David Guetta & Chris Willis featuring Fergie & LMFAO	
19 June	"Gettin' Over You"	David Guetta & Chris Willis featuring Fergie & LMFAO	
26 June	"Kickstarts"	Example	
3 July	"Kickstarts"	Example	
10 July	"Kickstarts"	Example	
17 July	"We No Speak Americano" †	Yolanda Be Cool vs. DCUP	
24 July	"We No Speak Americano" †	Yolanda Be Cool vs. DCUP	
31 July ^{[a]}	"We No Speak Americano" †	Yolanda Be Cool vs. DCUP	
7 August	"We No Speak Americano" †	Yolanda Be Cool vs. DCUP	
14 August	"Club Can't Handle Me"	Flo Rida featuring David Guetta	
21 August ^{[a]}	"Club Can't Handle Me"	Flo Rida featuring David Guetta	
28 August	"Club Can't Handle Me"	Flo Rida featuring David Guetta	
4 September	"Club Can't Handle Me"	Flo Rida featuring David Guetta	
11 September	"Club Can't Handle Me"	Flo Rida featuring David Guetta	
18 September	"Katy On a Mission"	Katy B	
25 September	"Katy On a Mission"	Katy B	
2 October	"Katy On a Mission"	Katy B	
9 October	"Katy On a Mission"	Katy B	
16 October	"Miami 2 Ibiza"	Swedish House Mafia vs. Tinie Tempah	
23 October	"Barbra Streisand"	Duck Sauce	
30 October	"Barbra Streisand"	Duck Sauce	
6 November	"Barbra Streisand"	Duck Sauce	
13 November	"Barbra Streisand"	Duck Sauce	
20 November	"The Time (Dirty Bit)"	The Black Eyed Peas	
27 November	"The Time (Dirty Bit)"	The Black Eyed Peas	
4 December	"The Time (Dirty Bit)"	The Black Eyed Peas	
11 December	"The Time (Dirty Bit)"	The Black Eyed Peas	
18 December ^{[a]}	"The Time (Dirty Bit)"	The Black Eyed Peas	
25 December	"The Time (Dirty Bit)"	The Black Eyed Peas	

- ^{a} – the single was simultaneously number-one on the UK Singles Chart during this chart week.

== See also ==
- List of number-one singles of 2010 (UK)
- List of UK Dance Chart number-one albums of 2010
- List of UK Official Download Chart number-one singles of 2010
- List of UK Indie Chart number-one singles of 2010
- List of UK Rock Chart number-one singles of 2010
- List of UK R&B Chart number-one singles of 2010
