= Supafly (song) =

Single by Fugative
- Released: 17 January 2010
- Recorded: 2009
- Genre: Grime; hip hop; snap
- Length: 3:06
- Label: Hard2Beat Records
- Songwriter(s): Harry Byart
- Producer(s): Da Seth

Fugative singles chronology
"Jimmy Shoe" (2009)	"Supafly" (2010)	"Crush" (2010)

"Supafly" is a single by British artist Fugative. It was released on 17 January 2010 on digital download on Hard2Beat Records. The track charted at number 48 on the UK Singles Chart.

== Remixes ==
There were six remixes available on digital download of "Supafly" – the longest is the "Static Shokx Remix", with runs for 6:06. Other remixes include the "A1 Bassline Remix", "Cookie Monsta Remix", "Roska Remix" & the "Bass Slammers Remix". On the other single of "Supafly" there is the "Tek-One Remix".

== Track listing ==
- Digital download

Disc 1

1. "Supafly" (Radio Edit) – 3:30
2. "Supafly" (A1 Bassline Remix) – 4:32
3. "Supafly" (Static Shokx Remix) – 6:06
4. "Supafly" (Cookie Monsta Remix) – 4:05
5. "Supafly" (Roska Remix) – 4:29
6. "Supafly" (Bass Slammers Remix) – 5:59

Disc 2

1. "Supafly" (Radio Edit) – 3:30
2. "Supafly" (Tek-One Remix) – 5:08

== Chart performance ==
The song first appeared on the UK Singles Chart on 30 January 2010 at number 48, then in its next week on 6 February 2010, it went down to number 98.

Chart (2010)	Peak Position
UK Singles (OCC)	48
United Kingdom (R&B Chart)	16
United Kingdom (Indie Chart)	5
