= Crush (Fugative song) =

Single by Fugative feat Ruff Diamondz
- Released: 9 May 2010
- Genre: Hip hop; R&B
- Length: 3:09
- Label: Hard2Beat Records
- Songwriter(s): Harry Byart
- Producer(s): Naughty Boy

Fugative singles chronology
"Supafly" (2010)	"Crush" (2010)	"Bad Girl" (2010)

"Crush" is the third single by British rapper Fugative, featuring Troy & Martika of the British group Ruff Diamondz. It was released as a Digital Download on 9 May 2010, with the CD single being released the following day. According to the Official Chart Update, it became Fugative's most successful single to date. On 16 May 2010 the single entered the UK Singles Chart at number 26, making it his first Top 40 hit.

== Track listing ==
UK iTunes download

1. "Crush" featuring Ruff Diamondz (radio edit) – 3:09
2. "Crush" (Moto Blanco edit) – 3:21
3. "Crush" (Moto Blanco club mix) – 7:12
4. "Crush" (Scratcher and DVA remix) – 4:19
5. "Crush" (Nadastorm remix) – 5:15

UK CD single

1. "Crush" (radio edit)
2. "Crush" (Moto Blanco edit)
3. "Crush" (Moto Blanco remix)
4. "Crush" (DVA remix)
5. "Crush" (Nadatrom remix)
6. "Crush" (Bass Slammers remix)

== Chart performance ==
"Crush" debuted on the UK Singles Chart on 16 May 2010 at a current peak of #26. Crush spent two weeks inside the top 100 the 2nd week going down to 53. The single also managed to reach #5 on the UK Dance Chart as well as claiming the number-one spot on the UK Indie Chart.

Chart (2010)	Peak position
UK Singles (OCC)	26
UK Indie (OCC)	1
UK Dance (OCC)	5

== Release history ==
Region	Date	Format	Label
United Kingdom	9 May 2010	Digital download	Hard2Beat Records
United Kingdom	10 May 2010	CD single	Hard2Beat Records
