= Fugative =

British rapper

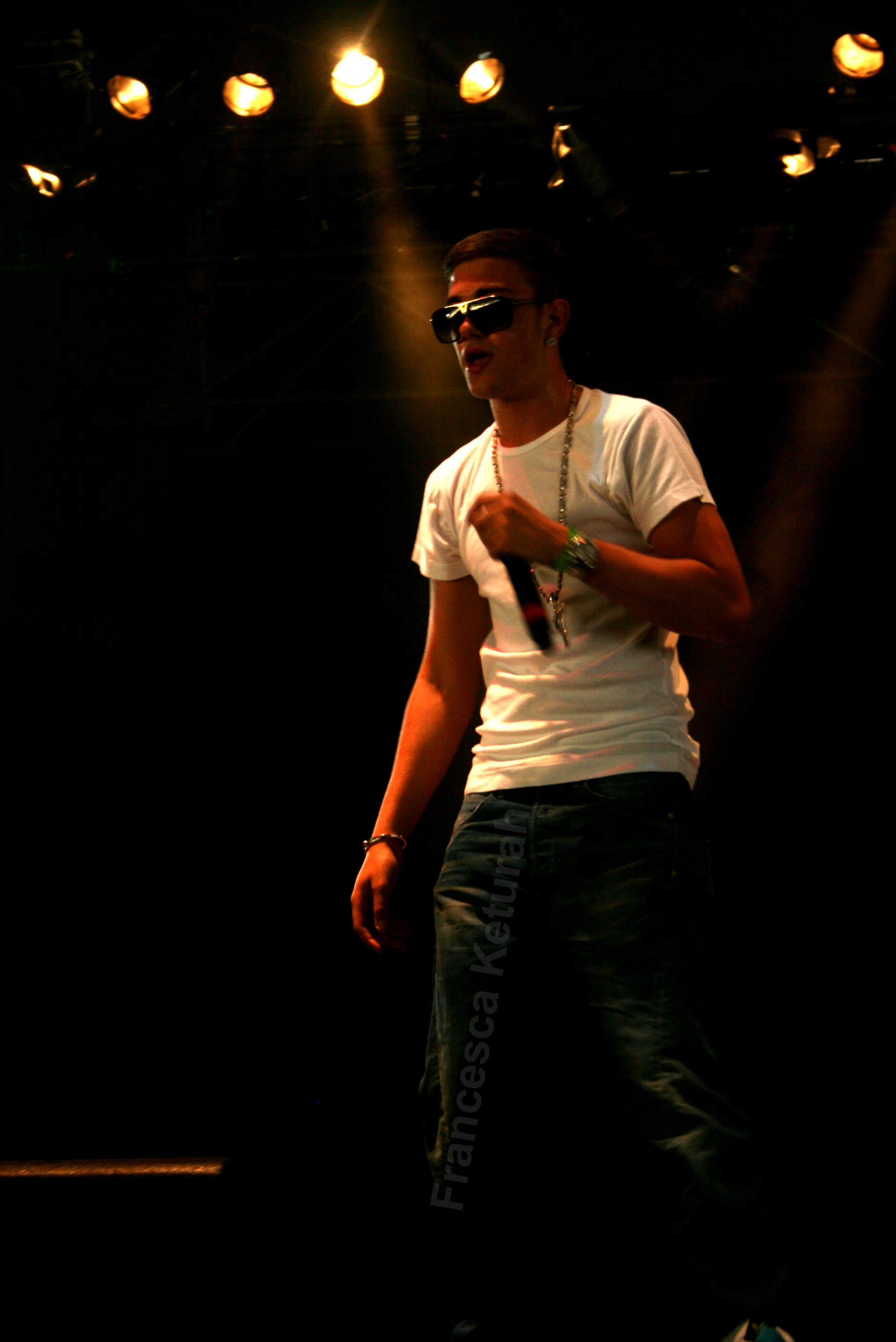

Background information
- Also known as: Harry James
- Born: Harry James Byart; 11 March 1994 (age 32)
- Origin: Essex, England
- Genres: Hip hop; grime; R&B
- Occupations: Rapper; singer; songwriter; record producer
- Years active: 2008–present
- Label: Sony ATV
- Website: fugative.co.uk

Harry James Byart (born 11 March 1994), better known by his former stage name Fugative, is an English rapper. He worked with Kirk Burrowes in April 2009 in Atlanta the former manager of Mary J. Blige and co-founder of Bad Boy Records after Burrowes was contacted by Byart's mother Gloria who previously worked as a publicist to Marvin Gaye. Fugative has been favourably received by BBC Radio One's Nick Grimshaw who proclaimed, "This kid is the NUTS!" on his Switch Fugative also released "The Departure" Mixtape in 2010.

== Early career ==
His debut single "It's Summertime", peaked at number two on the UK Urban Chart before remaining in the top five for 17 consecutive weeks. He released his second single "Jimmy Shoe" on 6 April 2009, followed by his third single, "Supafly", peaking at No.48 on the UK Singles Chart.

On 10 May 2010, "Crush", his fourth single was released. It reached No.26 on the UK chart and remains his highest charting single to date. A fifth single, "Bad Girl" feat. Celeste Scalone peaked at No.59. On 27 February 2011, "Go Hard", his sixth single featuring MZ Bratt and Wiley was released. Ed Sheeran and Sway featured on his seventh single "Home", released 4 September 2011.

He released singles "OTT" and "Charlie Sheen" between 2012 and 2013, the singles were due to be from his upcoming EP 'Where The Story Ends', but was eventually never released.

== Drug-smuggling accusations ==
On 7 September 2017, Byart was sighted exchanging cash with a driver as part of a drug-peddling operation.

Pleading ignorance, Byart was found not guilty of conspiracy to supply cocaine on 16 July 2019 after a four-week court case.

== Discography ==
=== Singles ===
Title	Year	Peak chart positions		Album
Title	Year	UK	UK Urban Chart	Album
"It's Summertime"	2008	—	2	Non-album singles
"Jimmy Shoe"	2009	179	—	Non-album singles
"Supafly"	2010	48	—	Non-album singles
"Crush"	2010	26	—	Non-album singles
"Bad Girl"	2010	59	—	Non-album singles
"Go Hard" (Feat. Mz. Brattz & Wiley)	2011	—	—	The Departure Mixtape
"Home" (Feat. Ed Sheeran & Sway)	2011	—	—	The Departure Mixtape
"OTT"	2013	—	—	TBC
"Charlie Sheen"	2013	—	—	TBC
