= Bad Girl (Fugative song) =

Single by Fugative
- Released: 25 July 2010
- Recorded: 2010
- Genre: Hip hop; electro-R&B
- Length: 3:06
- Label: Hard2Beat Records
- Songwriter(s): Byart
- Producer(s): Da Seth

Fugative singles chronology
"Crush" (2010)	"Bad Girl" (2010)	"Sun Don't Shine" (2012)

"Bad Girl" is a single by British artist, Fugative. It released on 25 July 2010 on digital download on Hard2Beat Records. Celeste Scalone provides vocals on the song's hook, but is uncredited. The track charted at number 59 on the UK Singles Chart.

== Track listing ==
Digital download
No.	Title	Length
1.	"Bad Girl" (Radio Edit)	3:23
2.	"Bad Girl" (Dawood & Preston Edit)	2:55
3.	"Bad Girl" (Dawood & Preston Remix)	5:46
4.	"Bad Girl" (Lil Silva Remix)	4:05
5.	"Bad Girl" (Tek-One Remix)	5:46
6.	"Bad Girl" (TreMoreFire Dubz Mix)	5:52

== Chart performance ==
Chart (2010)	Peak Position
UK Singles (The Official Charts Company)	59
UK Dance (OCC)	9
UK Indie (OCC)	4

== Release history ==
Region	Date	Format	Label
United Kingdom	25 July 2010	Digital download	Hard2Beat Records
