= List of UK R&B Albums Chart number ones of 2010 =

The logo of the Official Charts Company, responsible for compiling all of the official music charts in the United Kingdom, including the R&B albums chart.

The UK R&B Chart is a weekly chart, first introduced in October 1994, that ranks the 40 biggest-selling singles and albums that are classified in the R&B genre in the United Kingdom. The chart is compiled by the Official Charts Company, and is based on sales of CDs, downloads, vinyl and other formats over the previous seven days.

The following are the number-one albums of 2010.

== Number-one albums ==
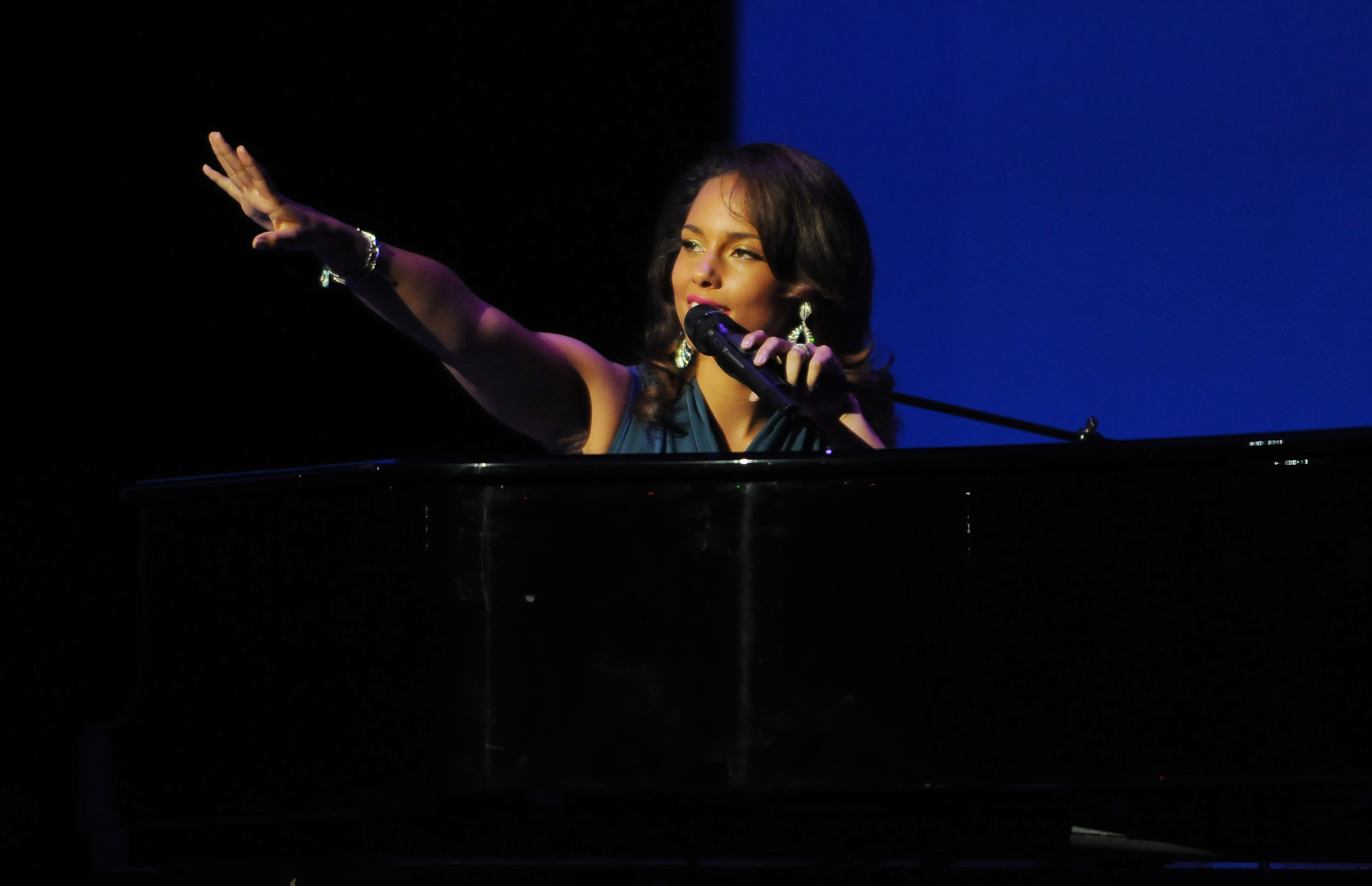
The Element of Freedom by Alicia Keys spent 15 weeks at number one in 2010, including 13 consecutive weeks at the top spot from January through to April. It has since been certified 3× Platinum by the BPI, denoting sales of more than 900,000 copies.

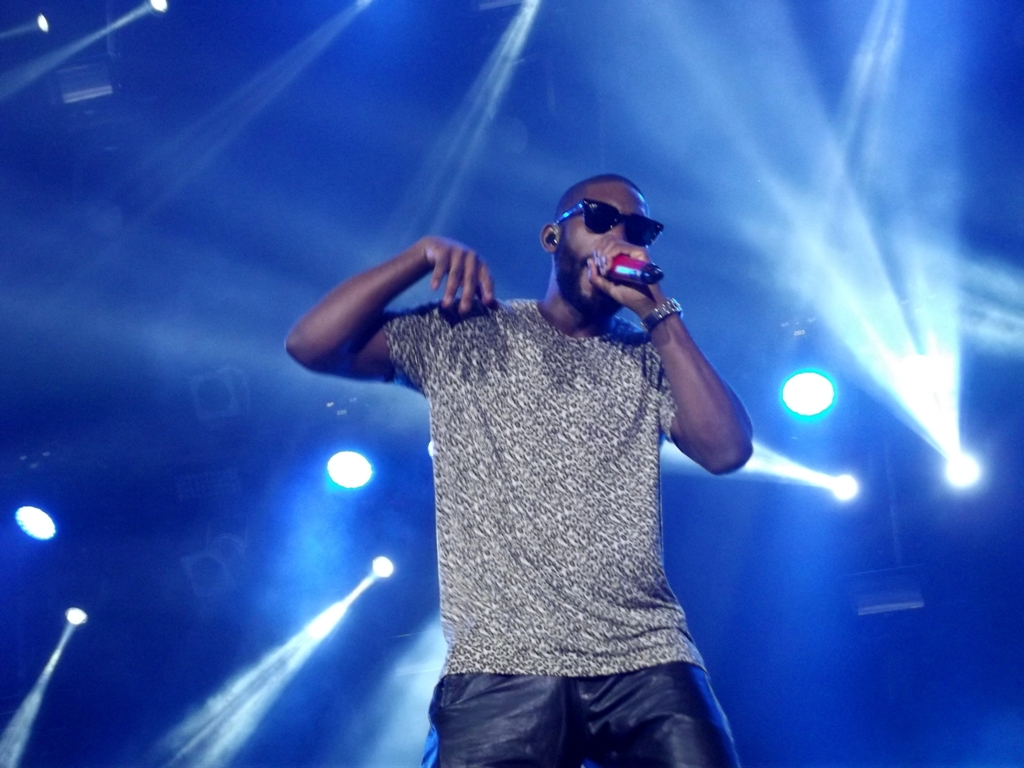
Tinie Tempah's debut album, Disc-Overy, saw four weeks at the top spot and garnered three number-one R&B singles - "Pass Out", "Frisky" and "Written in the Stars".

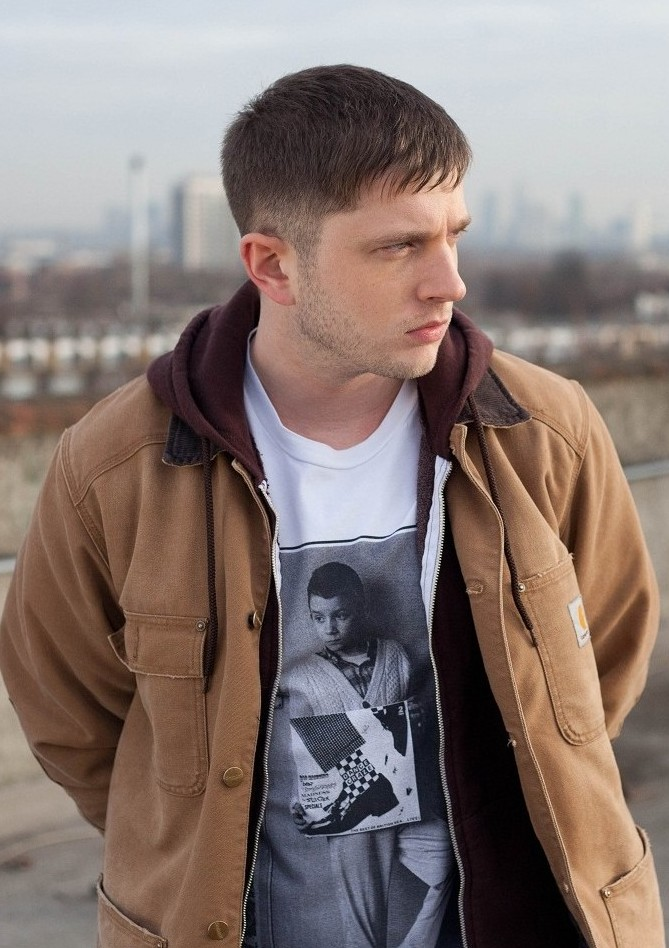
The eight weeks that The Defamation of Strickland Banks spent at number one helped Plan B to sell over 1.2 million copies of the set, earning him a 4× Platinum BPI certification.

Issue date	Album	Artist	Record label	Ref.
2 January ^{[b]}	The E.N.D	The Black Eyed Peas	Interscope	
9 January ^{[b]}	The E.N.D	The Black Eyed Peas	Interscope	
16 January	The E.N.D	The Black Eyed Peas	Interscope	
23 January	The Element of Freedom	Alicia Keys	J	
30 January	The Element of Freedom	Alicia Keys	J	
6 February	The Element of Freedom	Alicia Keys	J	
13 February ^{[a]}	The Element of Freedom	Alicia Keys	J	
20 February ^{[a]}	The Element of Freedom	Alicia Keys	J	
27 February	The Element of Freedom	Alicia Keys	J	
6 March	The Element of Freedom	Alicia Keys	J	
13 March	The Element of Freedom	Alicia Keys	J	
20 March	The Element of Freedom	Alicia Keys	J	
27 March	The Element of Freedom	Alicia Keys	J	
3 April	The Element of Freedom	Alicia Keys	J	
10 April	The Element of Freedom	Alicia Keys	J	
17 April	The Element of Freedom	Alicia Keys	J	
24 April ^{[a]}	The Defamation of Strickland Banks	Plan B	679/Atlantic	
1 May	The Defamation of Strickland Banks	Plan B	679/Atlantic	
8 May ^{[a]}	The Defamation of Strickland Banks	Plan B	679/Atlantic	
15 May	The Defamation of Strickland Banks	Plan B	679/Atlantic	
22 May	The Defamation of Strickland Banks	Plan B	679/Atlantic	
29 May	The Defamation of Strickland Banks	Plan B	679/Atlantic	
5 June	The Defamation of Strickland Banks	Plan B	679/Atlantic	
12 June	The Element of Freedom	Alicia Keys	J	
19 June	The Element of Freedom	Alicia Keys	J	
26 June	Thank Me Later	Drake	Young Money/Cash Money/Universal	
3 July ^{[a]}	Recovery	Eminem	Aftermath/Interscope/Shady	
10 July ^{[a]}	Recovery	Eminem	Aftermath/Interscope/Shady	
17 July	Recovery	Eminem	Aftermath/Interscope/Shady	
24 July ^{[a]}	Recovery	Eminem	Aftermath/Interscope/Shady	
31 July ^{[a]}^{[b]}	Recovery	Eminem	Aftermath/Interscope/Shady	
7 August ^{[a]}	Recovery	Eminem	Aftermath/Interscope/Shady	
14 August	Recovery	Eminem	Aftermath/Interscope/Shady	
21 August ^{[a]}^{[b]}	Recovery	Eminem	Aftermath/Interscope/Shady	
28 August	Recovery	Eminem	Aftermath/Interscope/Shady	
4 September ^{[a]}	Recovery	Eminem	Aftermath/Interscope/Shady	
11 September	Recovery	Eminem	Aftermath/Interscope/Shady	
18 September	Recovery	Eminem	Aftermath/Interscope/Shady	
25 September	Recovery	Eminem	Aftermath/Interscope/Shady	
2 October	Recovery	Eminem	Aftermath/Interscope/Shady	
9 October	The Defamation of Strickland Banks	Plan B	679/Atlantic	
16 October ^{[a]}	Disc-Overy	Tinie Tempah	Parlophone/Disturbing London	
23 October	Disc-Overy	Tinie Tempah	Parlophone/Disturbing London	
30 October	Disc-Overy	Tinie Tempah	Parlophone/Disturbing London	
6 November	Disc-Overy	Tinie Tempah	Parlophone/Disturbing London	
13 November	Libra Scale	Ne-Yo	Def Jam	
20 November ^{[b]}	The Lady Killer	Cee Lo Green	Elektra/Roadrunner	
27 November	Loud	Rihanna	Def Jam/SRP	
4 December	Outta This World	JLS	Epic/Sony	
11 December	Outta This World	JLS	Epic/Sony	
18 December	Loud	Rihanna	Def Jam/SRP	
25 December ^{[b]}	Loud	Rihanna	Def Jam/SRP	

== Notes ==
- ^{a} - The album was simultaneously number-one on the UK albums chart.
- ^{b} - The artist was simultaneously number-one on the R&B singles chart.

== See also ==
- List of UK Albums Chart number ones of 2010
- List of UK R&B Chart number-one singles of 2010
