= List of UK Singles Downloads Chart number ones of the 2010s =

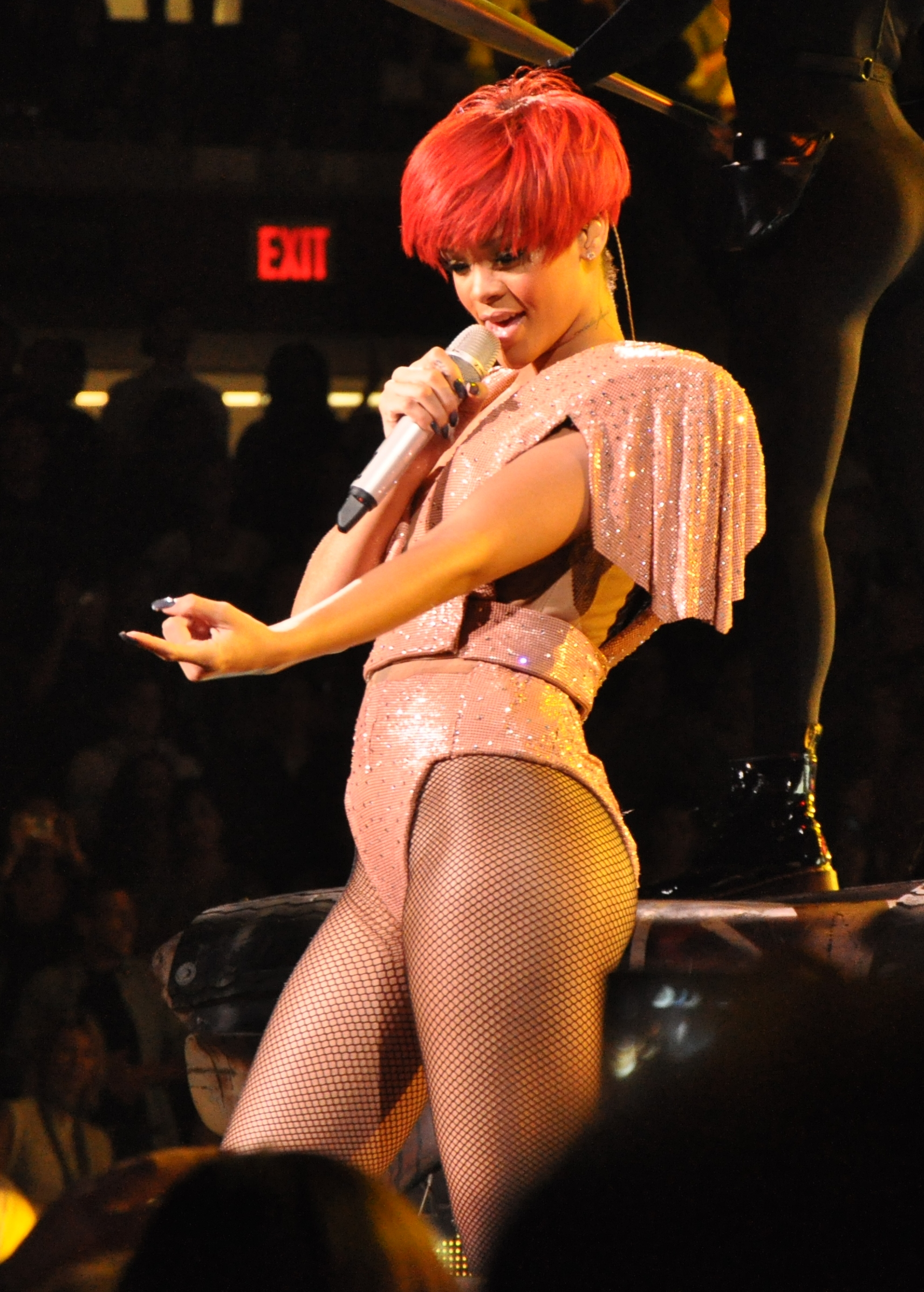
Rihanna has topped the chart for 13 weeks this decade, appearing on five number-one singles.

This is the list of the number-one singles of the UK Singles Downloads Chart during the 2010s. 379 different singles have topped the chart during the 2010s.

== Number-one singles ==
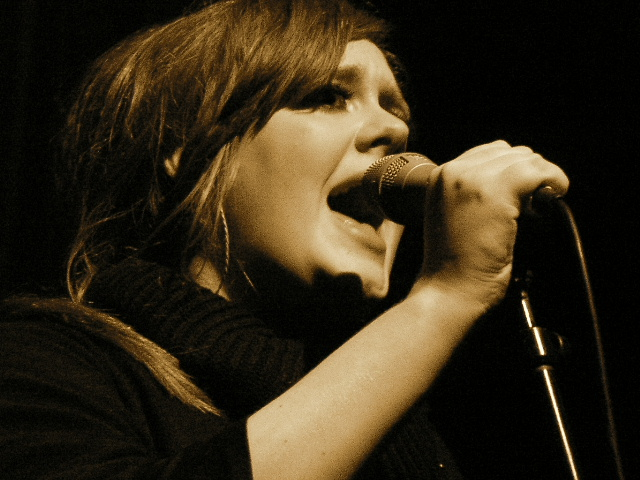
"Someone like You" by Adele spent five weeks at the top of the chart during 2011.

Key
No.	nth single to top the UK Singles Downloads Chart
re	Return of a single to number one
†	Most-downloaded single of the year (Note: In 2010, the most-downloaded single of the year was "Love the Way You Lie" by Eminem featuring Rihanna, which entered the chart on 27 June and peaked at number two.)

No.	Artist (Note: The artist, single, date of reaching number one and number of weeks at number one are those given by the Official Charts Company.)	Single	Record label	Reached number one (for the week ending)	Weeks at number one
2010
110	Rage Against the Machine	"Killing in the Name"	Sony	26 December 2009	2
re	Lady Gaga	"Bad Romance"	Universal	9 January 2010	1
111	Iyaz	"Replay"	Warner	16 January 2010	2
112	Owl City	"Fireflies"	Universal	30 January 2010	3
113	Helping Haiti	"Everybody Hurts"	Sony	20 February 2010	1
114	Florence and the Machine and Dizzee Rascal	"You Got the Dirtee Love"	Dirtee Stank/Universal	27 February 2010	1
115	Jason Derulo	"In My Head"	Warner	6 March 2010	1
116	Tinie Tempah	"Pass Out"	EMI	13 March 2010	3
117	Lady Gaga featuring Beyoncé	"Telephone"	Universal	3 April 2010	1
118	Scouting for Girls	"This Ain't a Love Song"	Sony	10 April 2010	2
119	Usher featuring will.i.am	"OMG"	Sony	24 April 2010	1
120	Diana Vickers	"Once"	Sony	1 May 2010	1
re	Usher featuring will.i.am	"OMG"	Sony	8 May 2010	1
121	Roll Deep featuring Jodie Connor	"Good Times"	EMI	15 May 2010	2
122	B.o.B featuring Bruno Mars	"Nothin' on You"	Warner	29 May 2010	1
123	Dizzee Rascal	"Dirtee Disco"	Dirtee Stank	5 June 2010	1
124	David Guetta and Chris Willis featuring Fergie and LMFAO	"Gettin' Over You"	EMI	12 June 2010	1
125	Shout For England featuring Dizzee Rascal and James Corden	"Shout"	Sony	19 June 2010	2
126	Katy Perry featuring Snoop Dogg	"California Gurls"	EMI	3 July 2010	2
127	JLS	"The Club Is Alive"	Sony	17 July 2010	1
128	B.o.B featuring Hayley Williams	"Airplanes"	Warner	24 July 2010	1
129	Yolanda Be Cool vs. DCUP	"We No Speak Americano"	Universal	31 July 2010	1
130	The Wanted	"All Time Low"	Universal	7 August 2010	1
131	Ne-Yo	"Beautiful Monster"	Universal	14 August 2010	1
132	Flo Rida featuring David Guetta	"Club Can't Handle Me"	Warner	21 August 2010	1
133	Roll Deep	"Green Light"	EMI	28 August 2010	1
134	Taio Cruz	"Dynamite"	Universal	4 September 2010	1
135	Olly Murs	"Please Don't Let Me Go"	Sony	11 September 2010	1
136	Alexandra Burke featuring Laza Morgan	"Start Without You"	Sony	18 September 2010	2
137	Bruno Mars	"Just the Way You Are"	Warner	2 October 2010	1
138	Tinie Tempah featuring Eric Turner	"Written in the Stars"	EMI	9 October 2010	1
139	Cee Lo Green	"Forget You"	Warner	16 October 2010	1
re	Bruno Mars	"Just the Way You Are"	Warner	23 October 2010	2
140	Cheryl Cole	"Promise This"	Universal	6 November 2010	1
141	Rihanna	"Only Girl (In the World)"	Universal	13 November 2010	2
142	JLS	"Love You More"	Sony	27 November 2010	1
143	The X Factor finalists 2010	"Heroes"	Sony	4 December 2010	1
144	Ellie Goulding	"Your Song"	Universal	11 December 2010	1
145	The Black Eyed Peas	"The Time (Dirty Bit)"	Universal	18 December 2010	1
146	Matt Cardle	"When We Collide"	Sony	25 December 2010	2
2011
147	Rihanna featuring Drake	"What's My Name?"	Universal	8 January 2011	2
148	Bruno Mars	"Grenade"	Warner	22 January 2011	2
149	Kesha	"We R Who We R"	Sony	5 February 2011	1
150	Jessie J featuring B.o.B	"Price Tag"	Universal	12 February 2011	2
151	Adele	"Someone Like You" †	Beggars	26 February 2011	4
152	Nicole Scherzinger	"Don't Hold Your Breath"	Universal	26 March 2011	1
re	Adele	"Someone Like You" †	Beggars	2 April 2011	1
153	Jennifer Lopez featuring Pitbull	"On the Floor"	Universal	9 April 2011	2
154	LMFAO featuring Lauren Bennett and GoonRock	"Party Rock Anthem"	Universal	23 April 2011	4
155	Bruno Mars	"The Lazy Song"	Warner	21 May 2011	1
156	Pitbull featuring Ne-Yo, Afrojack and Nayer	"Give Me Everything"	Sony	28 May 2011	3
157	Example	"Changed the Way You Kiss Me"	Ministry of Sound	18 June 2011	2
158	Jason Derulo	"Don't Wanna Go Home"	Warner	2 July 2011	2
159	DJ Fresh featuring Sian Evans	"Louder"	Ministry of Sound	16 July 2011	1
160	The Wanted	"Glad You Came"	Universal	23 July 2011	2
161	JLS featuring Dev	"She Makes Me Wanna"	Sony	6 August 2011	1
162	Cher Lloyd	"Swagger Jagger"	Sony	13 August 2011	1
163	Nero	"Promises"	MTA	20 August 2011	1
164	Wretch 32 featuring Josh Kumra	"Don't Go"	Ministry of Sound	27 August 2011	1
165	Olly Murs featuring Rizzle Kicks	"Heart Skips a Beat"	Sony	3 September 2011	1
166	Maroon 5 featuring Christina Aguilera	"Moves Like Jagger"	Universal	10 September 2011	1
167	Pixie Lott	"All About Tonight"	Universal	17 September 2011	1
168	One Direction	"What Makes You Beautiful"	Sony	24 September 2011	1
169	Dappy	"No Regrets"	Universal	1 October 2011	1
re	Maroon 5 featuring Christina Aguilera	"Moves Like Jagger"	Universal	8 October 2011	1
170	Rihanna featuring Calvin Harris	"We Found Love"	Universal	15 October 2011	3
171	Professor Green featuring Emeli Sandé	"Read All About It"	EMI	5 November 2011	2
re	Rihanna featuring Calvin Harris	"We Found Love"	Universal	19 November 2011	3
172	The X Factor finalists 2011	"Wishing on a Star"	Sony	10 December 2011	1
173	Olly Murs	"Dance with Me Tonight"	Sony	17 December 2011	1
174	Little Mix	"Cannonball"	Sony	24 December 2011	1
175	Military Wives with Gareth Malone	"Wherever You Are"	Universal	31 December 2011	1
2012
176	Coldplay	"Paradise"	EMI	7 January 2012	1
177	Flo Rida	"Good Feeling"	Warner	14 January 2012	1
178	Jessie J	"Domino"	Universal	21 January 2012	2
179	Cover Drive	"Twilight"	Universal	4 February 2012	1
180	David Guetta featuring Sia	"Titanium"	EMI	11 February 2012	1
181	Gotye featuring Kimbra	"Somebody That I Used to Know" †	Universal	18 February 2012	1
182	DJ Fresh featuring Rita Ora	"Hot Right Now"	Ministry of Sound	25 February 2012	1
re	Gotye featuring Kimbra	"Somebody That I Used to Know" †	Universal	3 March 2012	4
183	Katy Perry	"Part of Me"	EMI	31 March 2012	1
184	Chris Brown	"Turn Up the Music"	Sony	7 April 2012	1
185	Carly Rae Jepsen	"Call Me Maybe"	Universal	14 April 2012	4
186	Tulisa	"Young"	Universal	12 May 2012	1
187	Rita Ora featuring Tinie Tempah	"R.I.P."	Sony	19 May 2012	2
188	fun. featuring Janelle Monáe	"We Are Young"	Warner	2 June 2012	1
189	Rudimental featuring John Newman	"Feel the Love"	Warner	9 June 2012	1
190	Gary Barlow and The Commonwealth Band	"Sing"	Universal	16 June 2012	1
191	Cheryl	"Call My Name"	Universal	23 June 2012	1
192	Maroon 5 featuring Wiz Khalifa	"Payphone"	Universal	30 June 2012	1
193	will.i.am featuring Eva Simons	"This Is Love"	Universal	7 July 2012	1
re	Maroon 5 featuring Wiz Khalifa	"Payphone"	Universal	14 July 2012	2
194	Florence & The Machine	"Spectrum"	Universal	28 July 2012	2
195	Wiley featuring Ms D	"Heatwave"	Warner	11 August 2012	2
196	Rita Ora	"How We Do (Party)"	Sony	25 August 2012	1
197	Sam and the Womp	"Bom Bom"	Stiff	1 September 2012	1
198	Little Mix	"Wings"	Sony	8 September 2012	1
199	Ne-Yo	"Let Me Love You (Until You Learn to Love Yourself)"	Universal	15 September 2012	1
200	The Script featuring will.i.am	"Hall of Fame"	Sony	22 September 2012	2
201	Psy	"Gangnam Style"	Universal	6 October 2012	1
202	Rihanna	"Diamonds"	Universal	13 October 2012	1
203	Swedish House Mafia featuring John Martin	"Don't You Worry Child"	Universal	20 October 2012	1
204	Calvin Harris featuring Florence Welch	"Sweet Nothing"	Sony	27 October 2012	1
205	Labrinth featuring Emeli Sandé	"Beneath Your Beautiful"	Sony	3 November 2012	1
206	Robbie Williams	"Candy"	Universal	10 November 2012	2
207	One Direction	"Little Things"	Sony	24 November 2012	1
208	Olly Murs featuring Flo Rida	"Troublemaker"	Sony	31 November 2012	3
209	James Arthur	"Impossible"	Sony	22 December 2012	1
210	The Justice Collective	"He Ain't Heavy, He's My Brother"	Metropolis	29 December 2012	1
2013
re	James Arthur	"Impossible"	Sony	5 January 2013	1
211	will.i.am featuring Britney Spears	"Scream & Shout"	Universal	12 January 2013	3
212	Bingo Players featuring Far East Movement	"Get Up (Rattle)"	Ministry of Sound	2 February 2013	2
213	Macklemore and Ryan Lewis featuring Wanz	"Thrift Shop"	Macklemore	16 February 2013	1
214	Avicii vs. Nicky Romero	"I Could Be the One"	Universal	23 February 2013	1
215	One Direction	"One Way or Another (Teenage Kicks)"	Sony	2 March 2013	1
216	Justin Timberlake	"Mirrors"	Sony	9 March 2013	3
217	The Saturdays featuring Sean Paul	"What About Us"	Universal	30 March 2013	1
218	PJ & Duncan	"Let's Get Ready to Rhumble"	Demon	6 April 2013	1
219	Duke Dumont featuring A*M*E	"Need U (100%)"	Ministry of Sound	13 April 2013	2
220	Rudimental featuring Ella Eyre	"Waiting All Night"	Warner	27 April 2013	1
221	Daft Punk featuring Pharrell Williams	"Get Lucky"	Sony	4 May 2013	4
222	Naughty Boy featuring Sam Smith	"La La La"	Universal	1 June 2013	1
223	Robin Thicke featuring T.I. and Pharrell Williams	"Blurred Lines" †	Universal	8 June 2013	4
224	Icona Pop featuring Charli XCX	"I Love It"	Warner	6 July 2013	1
225	John Newman	"Love Me Again"	Universal	13 July 2013	1
re	Robin Thicke featuring T.I. and Pharrell Williams	"Blurred Lines" †	Universal	20 July 2013	1
226	Avicii	"Wake Me Up!"	Universal	27 July 2013	3
227	Miley Cyrus	"We Can't Stop"	Sony	17 August 2013	1
228	Ellie Goulding	"Burn"	Universal	24 August 2013	3
229	Katy Perry	"Roar"	Universal	14 September 2013	2
230	Jason Derulo featuring 2 Chainz	"Talk Dirty"	Warner	28 September 2013	2
231	OneRepublic	"Counting Stars"	Universal	12 October 2013	1
232	Miley Cyrus	"Wrecking Ball"	Sony	19 October 2013	1
re	OneRepublic	"Counting Stars"	Universal	26 October 2013	1
233	Lorde	"Royals"	Universal	2 November 2013	1
234	Eminem featuring Rihanna	"The Monster"	Universal	9 November 2013	1
235	Storm Queen	"Look Right Through"	Ministry of Sound	16 November 2013	1
236	Martin Garrix	"Animals"	Universal	23 November 2013	1
237	Bastille	"Of the Night"	Universal	30 November 2013	1
238	Calvin Harris and Alesso featuring Hurts	"Under Control"	Sony	7 December 2013	1
239	One Direction	"Story of My Life"	Sony	14 December 2013	1
240	Avicii	"Hey Brother"	Universal	21 December 2013	1
241	Sam Bailey	"Skyscraper"	Sony	28 December 2013	1
2014
242	Pharrell Williams	"Happy" †	Sony	4 January 2014	1
243	Pitbull featuring Kesha	"Timber"	Sony	11 January 2014	1
re	Pharrell Williams	"Happy" †	Sony	18 January 2014	2
244	Clean Bandit featuring Jess Glynne	"Rather Be"	Warner	1 February 2014	4
245	Sam Smith	"Money on My Mind"	Universal	1 March 2014	1
re	Pharrell Williams	"Happy" †	Sony	8 March 2014	1
246	Route 94 featuring Jess Glynne	"My Love"	Rinse	15 March 2014	1
247	DVBBS & Borgeous featuring Tinie Tempah	"Tsunami (Jump)"	Ministry of Sound	22 March 2014	1
248	Duke Dumont featuring Jax Jones	"I Got U"	Blasé Boys Club	29 March 2014	2
249	Aloe Blacc	"The Man"	Universal	12 April 2014	1
250	Sigma	"Nobody to Love"	Universal	19 April 2014	1
251	Kiesza	"Hideaway"	Universal	26 April 2014	1
252	Mr Probz	"Waves"	Left Lane	3 May 2014	1
253	Calvin Harris	"Summer"	Sony	10 May 2014	1
re	Mr Probz	"Waves"	Left Lane	17 May 2014	1
254	Rita Ora	"I Will Never Let You Down"	Universal	24 May 2014	1
255	Sam Smith	"Stay with Me"	Universal	31 May 2014	1
256	SecondCity	"I Wanna Feel"	Ministry of Sound	7 June 2014	1
257	Ed Sheeran	"Sing"	Warner	14 June 2014	1
258	Ella Henderson	"Ghost"	Sony	21 June 2014	2
259	Oliver Heldens & Becky Hill	"Gecko (Overdrive)"	Universal	5 July 2014	1
260	Ariana Grande featuring Iggy Azalea	"Problem"	Universal	12 July 2014	1
261	will.i.am featuring Cody Wise	"It's My Birthday"	Universal	19 July 2014	1
262	Rixton	"Me and My Broken Heart"	Universal	26 July 2014	1
263	Cheryl Cole featuring Tinie Tempah	"Crazy Stupid Love"	Universal	2 August 2014	1
264	Magic!	"Rude"	Sony	9 August 2014	1
265	Nico & Vinz	"Am I Wrong"	Warner	16 August 2014	2
266	David Guetta featuring Sam Martin	"Lovers on the Sun"	Warner	30 August 2014	1
267	Lilly Wood & Robin Schulz	"Prayer in C"	Warner	6 September 2014	1
268	The Script	"Superheroes"	Columbia	13 September 2014	1
269	Calvin Harris featuring John Newman	"Blame"	Sony	20 September 2014	1
270	Sigma featuring Paloma Faith	"Changing"	Universal	27 September 2014	1
271	Jessie J, Ariana Grande & Nicki Minaj	"Bang Bang"	Universal	4 October 2014	1
272	Meghan Trainor	"All About That Bass"	Sony	11 October 2014	4
273	Ed Sheeran	"Thinking Out Loud"	Warner	8 November 2014	1
274	Cheryl	"I Don't Care"	Universal	15 November 2014	1
275	Gareth Malone's All Star Choir	"Wake Me Up"	Universal	22 November 2014	1
276	Band Aid 30	"Do They Know It's Christmas?"	EMI	29 November 2014	2
277	Taylor Swift	"Blank Space"	EMI	13 December 2014	1
278	Mark Ronson featuring Bruno Mars	"Uptown Funk"	Sony	20 December 2014	1
279	Ben Haenow	"Something I Need"	Sony	27 December 2014	1
2015
re	Mark Ronson featuring Bruno Mars	"Uptown Funk"	Sony	3 January 2015	6
280	Ellie Goulding	"Love Me Like You Do"	Universal	14 February 2015	4
281	Years & Years	"King"	Universal	14 March 2015	1
282	Sam Smith featuring John Legend	"Lay Me Down"	Universal	21 March 2015	2
283	Jess Glynne	"Hold My Hand"	Warner	4 April 2015	2
284	Nick Jonas	"Jealous"	Universal	18 April 2015	1
285	Wiz Khalifa featuring Charlie Puth	"See You Again"	Warner	25 April 2015	3
286	OMI	"Cheerleader"	Sony	16 May 2015	1
287	LunchMoney Lewis	"Bills"	Sony	23 May 2015	1
re	OMI	"Cheerleader"	Sony	30 May 2015	1
288	Jason Derulo	"Want to Want Me"	Warner Bros.	6 June 2015	3
289	Deorro and Chris Brown	"Five More Hours"	Warner Bros.	27 June 2015	1
290	Tinie Tempah featuring Jess Glynne	"Not Letting Go"	Parlophone	4 July 2015	1
291	Lost Frequencies	"Are You with Me"	Universal	9 July 2015	1
292	David Zowie	"House Every Weekend"	Universal	16 July 2015	1
293	Little Mix	"Black Magic"	Sony	23 July 2015	2
294	Sigma	"Glitterball" featuring Ella Henderson	Universal	6 August 2015	1
295	One Direction	"Drag Me Down"	Sony	13 August 2015	1
296	Charlie Puth & Meghan Trainor	"Marvin Gaye"	Warner	20 August 2015	1
297	Jess Glynne	"Don't Be So Hard on Yourself"	Warner	27 August 2015	1
298	Rachel Platten	"Fight Song"	Sony	3 September 2015	1
299	Justin Bieber	"What Do You Mean?"	Universal	10 September 2015	1
300	Sigala	"Easy Love"	Ministry of Sound	17 September 2015	2
re	Justin Bieber	"What Do You Mean?"	Universal	1 October 2015	1
301	Sam Smith	"Writing's on the Wall"	Universal	8 October 2015	1
302	Philip George	"Alone No More"	3 Beat	15 October 2015	1
303	Jamie Lawson	"Wasn't Expecting That"	Warner	22 October 2015	1
304	KDA featuring Katy B & Tinie Tempah	"Turn the Music Louder (Rumble)"	Ministry of Sound	29 October 2015	1
305	Adele	"Hello"	Beggars	5 November 2015	5
306	Justin Bieber	"Love Yourself"	Universal	10 December 2015	3
307	Lewisham and Greenwich NHS Choir	"A Bridge over You"	Emu Bands	31 December 2015	1
2016
re	Justin Bieber	"Love Yourself"	Universal	7 January 2016	2
308	Shawn Mendes	"Stitches"	Warner	21 January 2016	2
309	Jonas Blue featuring Dakota	"Fast Car"	Universal	4 February 2016	1
310	Zayn	"Pillowtalk"	Sony	11 February 2016	1
311	Lukas Graham	"7 Years" †	Warner	18 February 2016	5
312	Mike Posner	"I Took a Pill in Ibiza"	Warner	24 March 2016	1
313	Sigala featuring Imani & DJ Fresh	"Say You Do"	Ministry of Sound	31 March 2016	1
re	Mike Posner	"I Took a Pill in Ibiza"	Warner	7 April 2016	2
314	Drake featuring Wizkid and Kyla	"One Dance"	Universal/Cash Money	14 April 2016	3
315	Calvin Harris featuring Rihanna	"This Is What You Came For"	Sony	12 May 2016	2
316	Justin Timberlake	"Can't Stop the Feeling!"	Sony	26 May 2016	4
317	Kungs vs. Cookin' on 3 Burners	"This Girl"	3 Beat	23 June 2016	4
318	Jonas Blue featuring JP Cooper	"Perfect Strangers"	Universal	21 July 2016	1
319	Calum Scott	"Dancing on My Own"	Universal	28 July 2016	1
320	Major Lazer featuring Justin Bieber and MØ	"Cold Water"	Because Music	5 August 2016	2
321	DJ Snake featuring Justin Bieber	"Let Me Love You"	Universal	19 August 2016	3
322	The Chainsmokers featuring Halsey	"Closer"	Sony	8 September 2016	3
323	James Arthur	"Say You Won't Let Go"	Sony	29 September 2016	4
324	Little Mix	"Shout Out to My Ex"	Sony	27 October 2016	3
325	Clean Bandit	"Rockabye"	Warner	17 November 2016	5
326	Matt Terry	"When Christmas Comes Around"	Sony	22 December 2016	1
327	Rag'n'Bone Man	"Human"	Sony	29 December 2016	1
2017
re	Clean Bandit	"Rockabye"	Warner	5 January 2017	1
re	Rag'n'Bone Man	"Human"	Sony	12 January 2017	1
328	Ed Sheeran	"Shape of You" †	Warner	19 January 2017	6
329	Ed Sheeran	"How Would You Feel (Paean)"	Warner	2 March 2017	1
re	Ed Sheeran	"Shape of You" †	Warner	9 March 2017	3
330	Ed Sheeran	"Galway Girl"	Warner	30 March 2017	1
331	Clean Bandit featuring Zara Larsson	"Symphony"	Warner	6 April 2017	2
332	Harry Styles	"Sign of the Times"	Sony	20 April 2017	2
re	Clean Bandit featuring Zara Larsson	"Symphony"	Warner	4 May 2017	1
333	DJ Khaled featuring Justin Bieber, Chance the Rapper and Quavo	"I'm the One"	Black Butter/Def Jam	11 May 2017	1
334	Luis Fonsi featuring Daddy Yankee & Justin Bieber,	"Despacito (Remix)"	Def Jam/RBMG/Republic/UMLE	18 May 2017	4
335	Ariana Grande	"One Last Time"	Universal	9 June 2017	1
re	Luis Fonsi featuring Daddy Yankee & Justin Bieber,	"Despacito (Remix)"	Def Jam/RBMG/Republic/UMLE	16 June 2017	1
336	Artists for Grenfell	"Bridge over Troubled Water"	Sony	23 June 2017	2
re	Luis Fonsi featuring Daddy Yankee & Justin Bieber,	"Despacito (Remix)"	Def Jam/RBMG/Republic/UMLE	7 July 2017	6
337	Pink	"What About Us"	Sony	24 August 2017	2
338	Taylor Swift	"Look What You Made Me Do"	Universal	7 September 2017	2
339	Sam Smith	"Too Good At Goodbyes"	Universal	21 September 2017	4
340	Camila Cabello featuring Young Thug	"Havana"	Sony	19 October 2017	5
341	Rita Ora	"Anywhere"	Sony	23 November 2017	3
342	Ed Sheeran	"Perfect"	Asylum	14 December 2017	6
2018
343	Eminem featuring Ed Sheeran	"River"	Interscope	25 January 2018	1
344	Sigrid	"Strangers"	Universal	1 February 2018	2
345	Rudimental featuring Jess Glynne, Macklemore and Dan Caplen	"These Days"	Warner	15 February 2018	6
346	George Ezra	"Paradise"	Sony	29 March 2018	2
347	Keala Settle	"This Is Me" †	Warner	12 April 2018	1
348	Ruti	"Dreams"	Universal	19 April 2018	1
349	Calvin Harris & Dua Lipa	"One Kiss"	Warner	26 April 2018	1
350	Ariana Grande	"No Tears Left To Cry"	Universal	3 May 2018	1
re	Calvin Harris & Dua Lipa	"One Kiss"	Warner	10 May 2018	4
351	Jess Glynne	"I'll Be There"	Warner	7 June 2018	2
352	Tom Walker	"Leave a Light On"	Relentless	21 June 2018	1
353	Clean Bandit featuring Demi Lovato	"Solo"	Warner	28 June 2018	1
354	George Ezra	"Shotgun"	Sony	5 July 2018	2
355	Baddiel, Skinner and The Lightning Seeds	"Three Lions"	Sony	19 July 2018	1
re	George Ezra	"Shotgun"	Sony	26 July 2018	3
356	Drake	"In My Feelings"	Cash Money/Republic	16 August 2018	1
re	George Ezra	"Shotgun"	Sony	23 August 2018	1
357	Calvin Harris and Sam Smith	"Promises"	Warner	30 August 2018	7
358	Lady Gaga and Bradley Cooper	"Shallow"	Universal	18 October 2018	4
359	Ariana Grande	"Thank U, Next"	Universal	15 November 2018	2
360	Pink	"A Million Dreams"	Universal	29 November 2018	1
361	Ava Max	"Sweet But Psycho"	Universal	6 December 2018	1
362	Dalton Harris featuring James Arthur	"The Power of Love"	Sony	13 December 2018	1
363	Mark Ronson and Miley Cyrus	"Nothing Breaks Like a Heart"	Sony	20 December 2018	1
364	LadBaby	"We Built This City"	FrtyFve	27 December 2018	2
2019
re	Ava Max	"Sweet But Psycho"	Universal	10 January 2019	3
365	Ariana Grande	"7 Rings"	Universal	31 January 2019	1
366	Sam Smith and Normani	"Dancing with a Stranger"	Universal	7 February 2019	1
367	Calvin Harris and Rag'n'Bone Man	"Giant"	Warner	14 February 2019	3
368	Pink	"Walk Me Home"	Universal	7 March 2019	1
re	Calvin Harris and Rag'n'Bone Man	"Giant"	Warner	14 March 2019	4
369	Lewis Capaldi	"Someone You Loved"	Universal	11 April 2019	4
370	RSPB	"Let Nature Sing"	The RSPB	9 May 2019	1
371	Lewis Capaldi	"Hold Me While You Wait"	Universal	16 May 2019	1
372	Ed Sheeran and Justin Bieber	"I Don't Care"	Warner	23 May 2019	6
373	Shawn Mendes and Camila Cabello	"Senorita"	Universal	4 July 2019	1
374	Lil Nas X	"Old Town Road"	Lil Nas X	11 July 2019	1
re	Shawn Mendes and Camila Cabello	"Senorita"	Universal	18 July 2019	5
375	Kygo and Whitney Houston	"Higher Love"	Sony/Kygo	22 August 2019	5
376	Ariana Grande, Miley Cyrus and Lana Del Rey	"Don't Call Me Angel"	Sony/Universal	20 September 2019	1
377	Regard	"Ride It"	Ministry of Sound	27 September 2019	1
378	Tones and I	"Dance Monkey"	Bad Batch	4 October 2019	9
379	X Factor Celebrities 2019	"Run"	Sony	12 December 2019	1
re	Tones and I	"Dance Monkey"	Bad Batch	19 December 2019	1
380	LadBaby	"I Love Sausage Rolls"	Frtyfve	26 December 2019	1

=== By artist ===
Eighteen different artists have had at least four number-one singles on the UK Singles Downloads Chart during the 2010s. The totals below include only credited performances, and do not include appearances on charity ensembles such as Helping Haiti or The X Factor finalists.

Artist	Number-one singles
Sam Smith	9
Tinie Tempah	8
Calvin Harris	8
Ed Sheeran	8
Ariana Grande	7
Jess Glynne	7
Justin Bieber	7
Rihanna	6
Bruno Mars	5
One Direction	5
Rita Ora	5
will.i.am	5
Jason Derulo	4
Olly Murs	4
Calvin Harris	4
Cheryl Cole	4
Clean Bandit	4
Little Mix	4
Miley Cyrus	4

=== By weeks at number one ===
Twenty nine different artists have spent seven or more weeks at the top of the UK Singles Downloads Chart during the 2010s. The totals below include only credited performances, and do not include appearances on charity ensembles such as Helping Haiti or The X Factor finalists.

Artist	Weeks at number one
Calvin Harris	29
Ed Sheeran	28
Justin Bieber	27
Sam Smith	19
Jess Glynne	17
Bruno Mars	14
Clean Bandit	14
Rihanna	14
Pharrell Williams	13
Luis Fonsi	11
Daddy Yankee	11
Adele	10
Calvin Harris	10
Camila Cabello	10
Tinie Tempah	10
Tones and I	10
Rag'n'Bone Man	9
Ariana Grande	8
Ellie Goulding	8
Jason Derulo	8
Rita Ora	8
Rudimental	8
will.i.am	8
George Ezra	8
Mark Ronson	8
Shawn Mendes	8
Little Mix	7
Macklemore	7
Justin Timberlake	7

=== By record label ===
Seven record labels have spent 10 weeks or more at number one during the 2010s.

Record label	Number-one singles	Weeks at number one
Universal Music Group	103	178
Sony Music Entertainment	69	128
Warner Music Group	44	112
EMI	12	18
Ministry of Sound	13	16
Beggars	2	10
Bad Batch	1	10
