= Dvbbs discography =

Discography of Canadian production duo

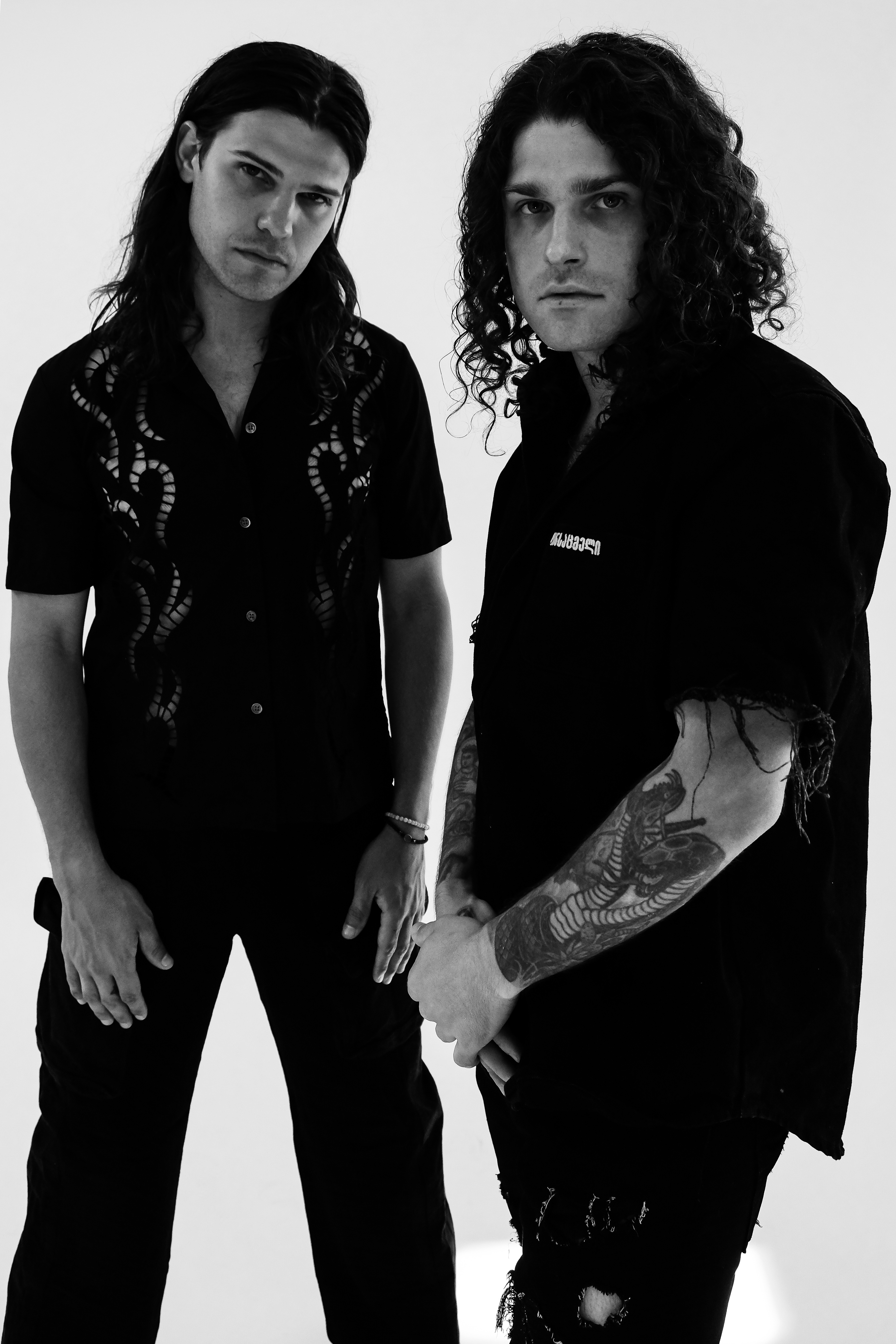
- Studio albums: 1
- EPs: 5
- Singles: 71

This is the discography for Canadian production duo Dvbbs.

== Studio albums ==
List of studio albums
Title	Details
Sleep	Released: October 22, 2021; Label: Ultra, Kanary; Formats: Digital download

== Extended plays ==
List of extended plays
Title	EP details	Peak chart positions
Title	EP details	CAN
Initio	Released: March 20, 2012; Label: Universal Music Canada; Format: Digital download	—
We Were Young	Released: December 22, 2014; Label: Kanary; Format: Digital download	—
Beautiful Disaster	Released: December 2, 2016; Label: Universal Music Canada; Format: Digital download	98
Blood of My Blood	Released: October 20, 2017; Label: Kanary, Ultra; Format: Digital download	—
Nothing to See Here	Released: August 28, 2020; Label: Ultra, Kanary; Formats: Digital download	—
"—" denotes an extended play that did not chart or was not released.

== Singles ==
Title	Year	Peak chart positions										Certifications	Album
Title	Year	CAN	AUT	BEL	DEN	FRA	GER	NLD	SWE	SWI	UK	Certifications	Album
"Love & Lies"	2012	—	—	—	—	—	—	—	—	—	—		Non-album singles
"We Are Electric" (featuring Simon Wilcox)	2013	—	—	—	—	—	—	—	—	—	—		Non-album singles
"We Know" (with Swanky Tunes and Eitro)	2013	—	—	—	—	—	—	—	—	—	—		Non-album singles
"Tsunami" (with Borgeous)	2013	80	14	1	8	3	14	1	3	17	—	MC: Platinum; BEA: 2× Platinum; GLF: 2× Platinum; IFPI DEN: 2× Platinum	Non-album singles
"Stampede" (with Borgeous and Dimitri Vegas & Like Mike)	2013	—	—	30	—	129	—	—	—	—	—		We Were Young
"Raveology" (with Vinai)	2014	—	—	84	—	—	—	—	—	—	—		Non-album single
"Tsunami (Jump)" (with Borgeous featuring Tinie Tempah)	2014	—	—	—	—	—	—	—	—	—	1	ARIA: Platinum; BPI: Gold	Demonstration
"Immortal" (with Tony Junior)	2014	—	—	—	—	—	—	—	—	—	—		We Were Young
"We Were Young"	2014	—	—	—	—	—	—	—	—	—	—		We Were Young
"Gold Skies" (with Sander van Doorn and Martin Garrix featuring Aleesia)	2014	57	—	57	—	183	—	94	—	—	49		Gold Skies
"Deja Vu" (with Joey Dale featuring Delora)	2014	—	—	—	—	—	—	—	—	—	—		We Were Young
"Pyramids" (with Dropgun featuring Sanjin)	2014	—	—	39	—	—	—	—	—	—	—		We Were Young
"Voodoo" (with Jay Hardway)	2015	—	—	—	—	—	—	—	—	—	—		Non-album singles
"Always"	2015	—	—	—	—	—	—	—	—	—	—		Non-album singles
"White Clouds"	2015	—	—	—	—	—	—	—	—	—	—		Non-album singles
"Raveheart"	2015	—	—	—	—	—	—	—	—	—	—		Non-album singles
"Never Leave"	2015	—	—	84	—	—	—	—	—	—	—		Non-album singles
"Angel" (featuring Dante Leon)	2016	—	—	—	—	—	—	—	—	—	—		Non-album singles
"La La Land" (with Shaun Frank featuring Delaney Jane)	2016	93	—	—	—	157	—	41	—	—	—	MC: Gold	Non-album singles
"Switch" (with Moti)	2016	—	—	—	—	—	—	—	—	—	—		Non-album singles
"24K"	2016	—	—	—	—	—	—	—	—	—	—		Beautiful Disaster
"Ur on My Mind"	2016	—	—	—	—	82	—	—	—	—	—		Beautiful Disaster
"Not Going Home" (with CMC$ featuring Gia Koka)	2016	52	—	—	—	—	—	83	—	—	—	MC: 2× Platinum	Beautiful Disaster
"Without U" (with Steve Aoki featuring 2 Chainz)	2017	—	—	—	—	—	—	—	—	—	—		Steve Aoki Presents Kolony
"You Found Me" (featuring Belly)	2017	—	—	—	—	—	—	—	—	—	—		Blood of My Blood
"Parallel Lines" (with CMC$ featuring Happy Sometimes)	2017	—	—	—	—	—	—	—	—	—	—	MC: Gold	Blood of My Blood
"Cozee" (featuring Cisco Adler)	2017	—	—	—	—	—	—	—	—	—	—		Blood of My Blood
"Make It Last" (with Nervo)	2017	—	—	—	—	—	—	—	—	—	—		Blood of My Blood
"Good Time" (featuring 24hrs)	2017	—	—	—	—	—	—	—	—	—	—		Blood of My Blood
"I Love It" (with Cheat Codes)	2018	—	—	—	—	—	—	—	—	—	—		Level 1
"Idwk" (with Blackbear)	2018	67	—	—	—	—	—	—	—	—	—	MC: Platinum	Non-album single
"Listen Closely" (featuring Safe)	2018	—	—	—	—	—	—	—	—	—	—		Nothing to See Here
"Somebody Like You" (featuring Saro)	2019	—	—	—	—	—	—	—	—	—	—		Nothing to See Here
"Gomf" (featuring Bridge)	2019	—	—	—	—	—	—	—	—	—	—		Nothing to See Here
"Need U"	2019	—	—	—	—	—	—	—	—	—	—		Nothing to See Here
"Wrong About You"	2020	—	—	—	—	—	—	—	—	—	—		Nothing to See Here
"Tinted Eyes" (featuring Blackbear and 24kGoldn)	2020	62	—	—	—	—	—	—	—	—	—	MC: Gold	Non-album single
"Swim" (with Sondr featuring Keelan Donovan)	2020	—	—	—	—	—	—	—	—	—	—		Nothing to See Here
"No Time" (with Cheat Codes featuring Wiz Khalifa and Prince$$ Rosie)	2020	—	—	—	—	—	—	—	—	—	—		Non-album singles
"West Coast" (featuring Quinn XCII)	2020	67	—	—	—	—	—	—	—	—	—	MC: Gold	Non-album singles
"Too Much" (with Dimitri Vegas & Like Mike and Roy Woods)	2021	—	—	—	—	—	—	—	—	—	—		Non-album singles
"I Don't" (with Johnny Orlando)	2021	—	—	—	—	—	—	—	—	—	—		Non-album singles
"Fool for Ya"	2021	—	—	—	—	—	—	—	—	—	—		Non-album singles
"Lose My Mind"	2021	—	—	—	—	—	—	—	—	—	—		Sleep
"Losing Sleep" (with Powfu)	2021	—	—	—	—	—	—	—	—	—	—		Sleep
"Leave the World Behind" (with Gattüso and Alida)	2021	—	—	—	—	—	—	—	—	—	—		Sleep
"Victory" (featuring YBN Nahmir)	2021	—	—	—	—	—	—	—	—	—	—		Sleep
"Say It" (with Space Primates featuring Gashi)	2021	—	—	—	—	—	—	—	—	—	—		Sleep
"Set Me Free" (featuring Aloe Blacc)	2021	—	—	—	—	—	—	—	—	—	—		Sleep
"When the Lights Go Down" (with Galantis featuring Cody Simpson)	2022	—	—	—	—	—	—	—	—	—	—		Non-album singles
"Ride or Die" (with Kideko and Haj)	2022	—	—	—	—	—	—	—	—	—	—		Non-album singles
"Summer Nights" (with Brandyn Burnette)	2022	—	—	—	—	—	—	—	—	—	—		Non-album singles
"Love Till It's Over" (featuring Mkla)	2022	—	—	—	—	—	—	—	—	—	—		Non-album singles
"Ocean of Tears" (with Imanbek)	2022	—	—	—	—	—	—	—	—	—	—		Non-album singles
"Where Do We Go" (with Lumix)	2022	—	—	—	—	—	—	—	—	—	—		Non-album singles
"Just Words"	2022	—	—	—	—	—	—	—	—	—	—		Non-album singles
"After Hours"	2023	—	—	—	—	—	—	—	—	—	—		Non-album singles
"Sh Sh Sh (Hit That)" (with Wiz Khalifa featuring Urfavxboyfriend and Goldsoul)	2023	—	—	—	—	—	—	—	—	—	—		Non-album singles
"Next to You" (with Loud Luxury featuring Kane Brown)	2023	34	—	—	—	—	—	—	—	—	—	MC: Gold	Non-album singles
"Synergy" (with Timmy Trumpet)	2023	—	—	—	—	—	—	—	—	—	—		Non-album singles
"Crew Thang" (with Jeremih and Sk8)	2023	—	—	—	—	—	—	—	—	—	—		Non-album singles
"Ur So Cute" (featuring Sebii)	2023	—	—	—	—	—	—	—	—	—	—		Non-album singles
"Breathe" (featuring Jesse Jo Stark)	2023	—	—	—	—	—	—	—	—	—	—		Non-album singles
"This Moment"	2023	—	—	—	—	—	—	—	—	—	—		Non-album singles
"No Love" (with Bonnie X Clyde and Trevor Daniel)	2023	—	—	—	—	—	—	—	—	—	—		There's No Tomorrow
"Inside Out" (with Bad Nonno)	2024	—	—	—	—	—	—	—	—	—	—		Non-album singles
"Let You Down" (with Gabry Ponte featuring Sofiloud)	2024	—	—	—	—	—	—	—	—	—	—		Non-album singles
"Warmth" (with Boaz van de Beatz featuring Jono Dorr)	2024	—	—	—	—	—	—	—	—	—	—		Non-album singles
"It Ain't Safe" (with Yellow Claw and Tavatli)	2024	—	—	—	—	—	—	—	—	—	—		Non-album singles
"Smile" (with Cash Cash featuring Quinn XCII)	2024	—	—	—	—	—	—	—	—	—	—		Non-album singles
"Upside Down" (with Bad Nonno)	2024	—	—	—	—	—	—	—	—	—	—		Non-album singles
"Reset" (with Dave Summer)	2025	—	—	—	—	—	—	—	—	—	—		Non-album singles
"No No No" (with Kvsh)	2025	—	—	—	—	—	—	—	—	—	—		Non-album singles
"Move a Little Closer" (with Abi Flynn)	2025	—	—	—	—	—	—	—	—	—	—		Non-album singles
"On Me" (with Matt Sassari)	2025	—	—	—	—	—	—	—	—	—	—		Non-album singles
"Promises" (with Badger)	2025	—	—	—	—	—	—	—	—	—	—		Non-album singles
"One Night" (with CHRSTPHR)	2026	—	—	—	—	—	—	—	—	—	—		Non-album singles
"Runaway" (with Naarly & Oliver Rio)	2026												
