= Borgeous discography =

This is the discography for American DJ and music producer Borgeous.

== Studio albums ==
Title	Details
13	Released: 12 August 2016; Label: Geousus Records, Armada Music; Format: Digital download, CD
My Own Way	Released: 25 December 2020; Label: Self-released; Format: Digital download

== Extended plays ==
Title	Details
Dear Me,	Released: 18 May 2018; Label: Geousus Records; Format: Digital download
Lights Out	Released: 16 August 2019; Label: Geousus Records; Format: Digital download
Indica Eyes (with Jared Watson)	Released: 26 July 2020; Label: Self-released; Format: Digital download
Unreleased Sessions, Vol. 1	Released: 7 August 2020; Label: Self-released; Format: Digital download

== Singles ==
List of singles as lead artist, with selected chart positions and certifications, showing year released and album name
Title	Year	Peak chart positions										Certifications	Album
Title	Year	CAN	AUT	BEL	DEN	FRA	GER	NLD	SWE	SWI	UK	Certifications	Album
"Tsunami" (with Dvbbs)	2013	80	14	1	8	3	14	1	3	17	—	GLF: 2× Platinum	Non-album single
"Stampede" (with Dvbbs and Dimitri Vegas & Like Mike)	2013	—	—	30	—	129	—	—	—	—	—		We Were Young
"Invincible"	2014	—	—	53	—	—	—	—	—	—	—		Non-album single
"Tsunami (Jump)" (with Dvbbs featuring Tinie Tempah)	2014	—	—	—	—	—	—	—	—	—	1	BPI: Platinum; ARIA: Platinum	Demonstration
"Celebration"	2014	—	—	—	—	—	—	—	—	—	—		Non-album singles
"Wildfire"	2014	—	—	—	—	—	—	—	—	—	—		Non-album singles
"Beast" (with Thomas Gold)	2014	—	—	—	—	—	—	—	—	—	—		Non-album singles
"Breathe"	2014	—	—	—	—	—	—	—	—	—	—		Non-album singles
"Break the House" (with Tony Junior)	2014	—	—	—	—	—	—	—	—	—	—		Non-album singles
"Tutankhamun" (with Dzeko & Torres)	2014	—	—	—	—	—	—	—	—	—	—		Non-album singles
"Toast" (featuring Whoo Kid, Waka Flocka and Wiz Khalifa)	2014	—	—	—	—	—	—	—	—	—	—		Non-album singles
"This Could Be Love" (with Shaun Frank featuring Delaney Jane)	2015	—	—	64	—	—	—	—	—	—	—		Non-album singles
"They Don't Know Us"	2015	—	—	—	—	—	—	—	—	—	—		Non-album singles
"Big Bang" (with David Solano)	2015	—	—	—	—	—	—	—	—	—	—		Non-album singles
"Zero Gravity" (featuring Lights)	2015	—	—	—	—	—	—	—	—	—	—		Non-album singles
"Lovestruck" (with Mike Hawkins)	2015	—	—	—	—	—	—	—	—	—	—		Non-album singles
"Machi" (with Ryos)	2015	—	—	—	—	—	—	—	—	—	—		Non-album singles
"Souls" (featuring M.Bronx)	2015	—	—	—	—	—	—	—	—	—	—		Non-album singles
"Sins"	2015	—	—	—	—	—	—	—	—	—	—		Non-album singles
"Yesterday" (with Zaeden)	2015	—	—	—	—	—	—	—	—	—	—		Non-album singles
"Ride It" (with Rvssian and M.R.I. featuring Sean Paul)	2016	—	—	—	—	—	—	—	—	—	—		13
"Wanna Lose You" (with tyDi)	2016	—	—	—	—	—	—	—	—	—	—		13
"Savage" (with Riggi & Piros and Lil Jon)	2016	—	—	—	—	—	—	—	—	—	—		13
"Lost & Found" (with 7 Skies featuring Neon Hitch)	2016	—	—	—	—	—	—	—	—	—	—		13
"Going Under" (with Loud Luxury)	2016	—	—	—	—	—	—	—	—	—	—		13
"Miracle" (with BRKLYN featuring Lenachka)	2016	—	—	—	—	—	—	—	—	—	—		13
"Young in Love" (featuring Karmin)	2016	—	—	—	—	—	—	—	—	—	—		13
"Over the Edge" (with tyDi featuring Dia Frampton)	2017	—	—	—	—	—	—	—	—	—	—		13
"Coffee Can Money" (with Morten featuring RUNAGROUND)	2017	—	—	—	—	—	—	—	—	—	—		Non-album singles
"Feel So Good" (with Riggi & Piros)	2017	—	—	—	—	—	—	—	—	—	—		Non-album singles
"Hold Up" (with Morten)	2017	—	—	—	—	—	—	—	—	—	—		Non-album singles
"Give Em What They Came For" (with Tre Sera featuring Avena Savage)	2017	—	—	—	—	—	—	—	—	—	—		Non-album singles
"You"	2017	—	—	—	—	—	—	—	—	—	—		Non-album singles
"Sweeter Without You" (with Taylr Renee)	2017	—	—	—	—	—	—	—	—	—	—		Non-album singles
"Making Me Feel"	2018	—	—	—	—	—	—	—	—	—	—		Non-album singles
"Make Me Yours" (with Zack Martino)	2018	—	—	—	—	—	—	—	—	—	—		Non-album singles
"Famous" (featuring Morgan St. Jean)	2018	—	—	—	—	—	—	—	—	—	—		Non-album singles
"Only Love" (with Nevve)	2018	—	—	—	—	—	—	—	—	—	—		Non-album singles
"Leave" (with Jordyn Jones)	2019	—	—	—	—	—	—	—	—	—	—		Non-album singles
"Better Anyway" (with Runaground)	2019	—	—	—	—	—	—	—	—	—	—		Non-album singles
"Alcohol"	2019	—	—	—	—	—	—	—	—	—	—		Non-album singles
"Nobody"	2019	—	—	—	—	—	—	—	—	—	—		Non-album singles
"Night & Day"	2020	—	—	—	—	—	—	—	—	—	—		Non-album singles
"Rescue Me" (with Sophie Simmons)	2020	—	—	—	—	—	—	—	—	—	—		Non-album singles
"Don't Be Scared"	2020	—	—	—	—	—	—	—	—	—	—		Non-album singles
"At Midnight"	2020	—	—	—	—	—	—	—	—	—	—		Non-album singles
"Underground"	2020	—	—	—	—	—	—	—	—	—	—		Non-album singles
"Someone Save Me"	2020	—	—	—	—	—	—	—	—	—	—		Non-album singles
"Never Know" (with Leah Culver)	2021	—	—	—	—	—	—	—	—	—	—		Non-album singles
"Stop Drop"	2021	—	—	—	—	—	—	—	—	—	—		Non-album singles
"Back & Forth" (with Brad Wood (UK))	2021	—	—	—	—	—	—	—	—	—	—		Non-album singles
"Lightspeed" (with Zagata)	2021	—	—	—	—	—	—	—	—	—	—		Non-album singles
"Watch This"	2022	—	—	—	—	—	—	—	—	—	—		Non-album singles
"—" denotes a recording that did not chart or was not released in that territory.

== Remixes ==
=== 2013 ===
- Ciara – "Goodies"

=== 2014 ===
- Havana Brown – "Warrior"
- Afrojack featuring Wrabel – "Ten Feet Tall"
- Dirty Heads – "My Sweet Summer"
- Lights – "Up We Go"

=== 2015 ===
- K Theory – "Night Lights"
- Morgan Page featuring The Oddictions & Britt Daley – "Running Wild"
- Ariana Grande – "One Last Time"

=== 2016 ===
- Icona Pop – "Brightside"
- Dirty Heads – "Oxygen"

=== 2018 ===
- Marshmello and Anne-Marie - "Friends"
- Why Don't We - "Hooked"
