= Demonstration (Tinie Tempah album) =

Studio album by Tinie Tempah
- Released: 1 November 2013
- Recorded: 2010–13
- Genres: Hip hop; grime; electronic
- Length: 61:36
- Labels: Parlophone; Disturbing London
- Producers: Alex da Kid; Balistiq; Chase & Status; Chris Loco; Crada; Craze & Hoax; Diplo; DJA; iSHi; Labrinth; Mojam; Naughty Boy; Rick Rock; Tom Rowlands; Zane Lowe; Rob Swire

Tinie Tempah chronology
Disc-Overy (2010)	Demonstration (2013)	Youth (2017)

Singles from Demonstration
- 1. "Trampoline" Released: 4 August 2013; 2. "Children of the Sun" Released: 28 October 2013; 3. "Lover Not a Fighter" Released: 2 February 2014; 4. "Tears Run Dry" Released: 22 July 2014

Demonstration is the second studio album by British rapper Tinie Tempah. The album was released on 4 November 2013 as the follow-up to his commercially successful debut album, Disc-Overy (2010). In December 2010, Tempah announced he was writing for his second album, saying there would be a more electronic and live feel to it. The first two singles from the album, "Trampoline" and "Children of the Sun" were released in the run-up to the album and both managed to enter the top ten of the UK Singles Chart. The album features collaborations with producers and guest artists such as Labrinth and Diplo and sees Tempah experimenting with new musical genres.

Demonstration received generally positive reviews, with music critics praising the choice of producers and Tempah's evolution as a musician. The album entered the UK Albums Chart at number three, making it less successful than Disc-Overy. It was beaten to a top two chart position by The Marshall Mathers LP 2 and James Arthur. The album was certified gold by the British Phonographic Industry on 21 February 2014.

== Background and recording ==
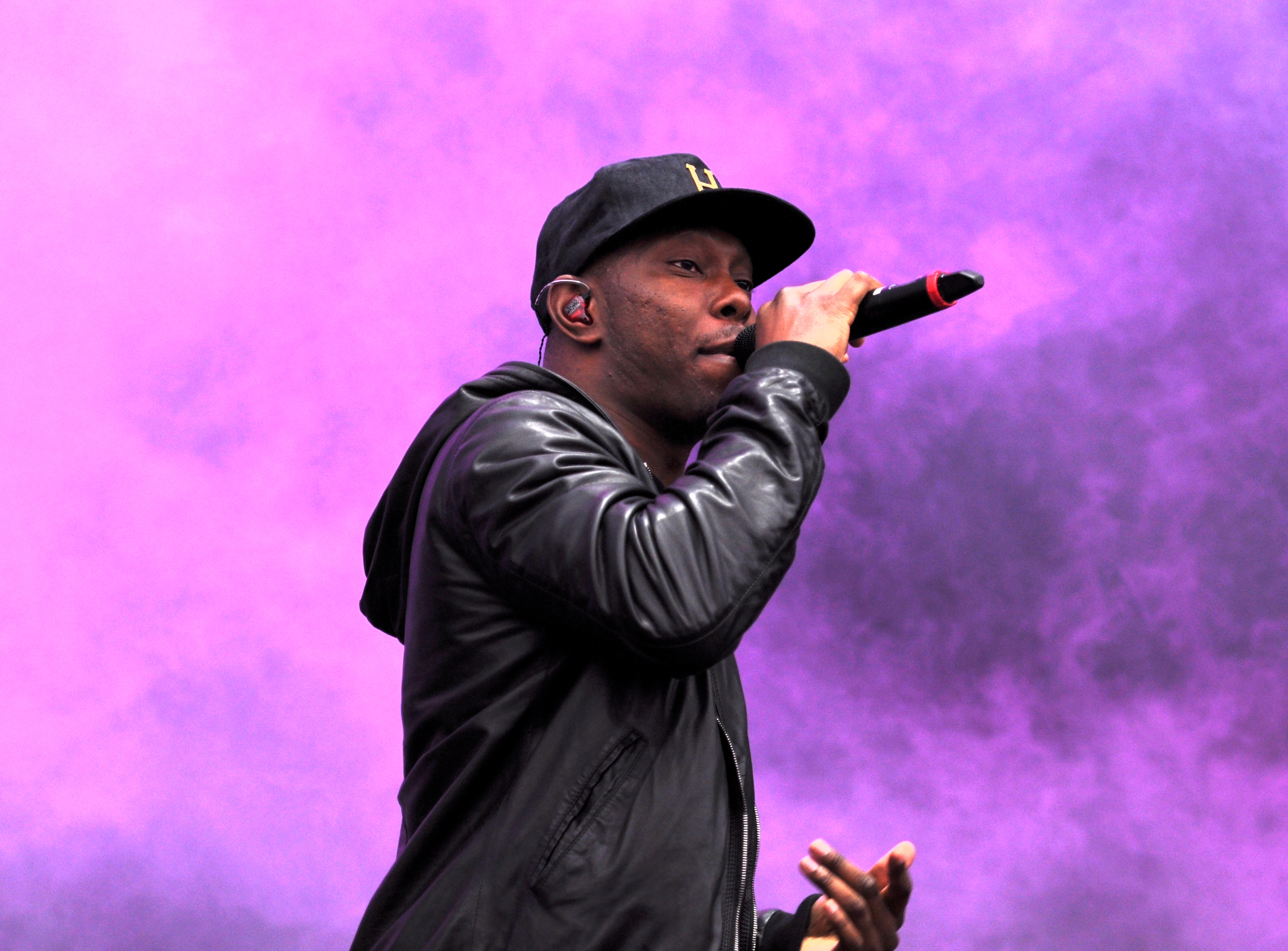
Dizzee Rascal has been a key influence for Tinie since his childhood, and features on the album track "Mosh Pit".

During an interview, Tempah commented on his second album: "I always like to work with different people on each project I do, just so you get a different sound and angle. I will be working with some of the same people I did for the first album, you know what they say ‘if it ain't broke then don’t try and fix it’." Tempah hoped to collaborate with other artists: "I really want to collaborate with Toronto's very own Drake. I think he's amazing at what he does. I'd also like to collaborate with Adele, Sleigh Bells, Lykke Li, The Script, Dev, James Blake ― those are the few that I'd really like to work with." Tempah asked a number of artists to appear on the album, including Gary Barlow, Chris Martin, Dizzee Rascal, and The Script. At the 2012 BRIT Awards, Tempah announced his second album would be called Demonstration. On 24 June 2012, Tempah performed on the main stage at Radio 1's Hackney Weekend, performing two of his newest songs: "Mosh Pit" and "Drinking from the Bottle", the latter of which he features on with Calvin Harris as the lead artist, and features on Harris' 2012 album 18 Months. In interviews, other artists announced that they were working on his album such as Labrinth, Dizzee Rascal, Big Sean and Emeli Sandé. Previous collaborators Naughty Boy and Labrinth have produced multiple tracks for the album, following their appearances on Disc-Overy. Chase & Status were on additional production duties for "Mosh Pit". They had previously worked with Tinie on their album No More Idols for the single "Hitz". Tempah's vocals from the song are also sampled on the hidden track "5 Minutes".

Originally the album was slated for a 2011 release but was pushed back until November 2013 due to "a few key finishing touches" to the album that needed to be made before releasing it. The album artwork was premiered on 4 September 2013. On 7 September, Eshraque "iSHi" Mughal confirmed the completion of the album. iSHi produced the album's second single "Children of the Sun" (which was released a week prior to the album) as well as the album track "Someday (Place in the Sun)". The album was released in different regions worldwide throughout November, starting on 1 November 2013.

== Writing and composition ==
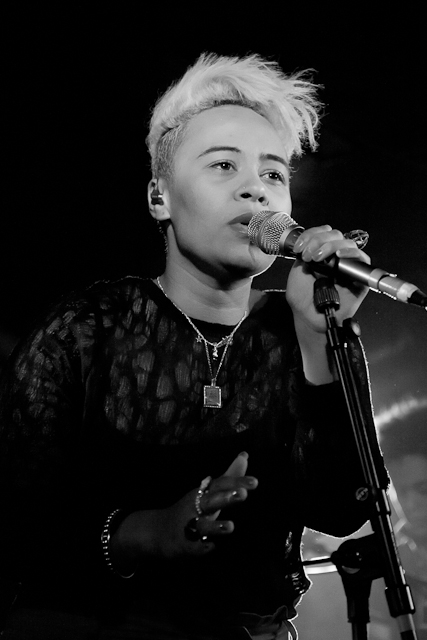
Emeli Sandé features on "A Heart Can Save the World", and also wrote Laura Mvula's chorus for "Heroes".

=== Influences and themes ===
In an interview with MistaJam, Tempah cites Dizzee Rascal and So Solid Crew as influences for the album, who've influenced him since his childhood. He also told Capital that Daft Punk influenced the album. Speaking about the album title Demonstration, Tinie said that it was about him compromising to make an album that was both true to where he came from and follows the trappings of mainstream hip hop: "Anyone who wants to take inspiration from it can have a sort of example based on my experiences of how to do this. So basically, do something that still nods to where you've come from, still feels very London, still feels very British, but kind of meets the criteria of what a mainstream record needs." He also commented oh how things change when signing with a record label and how the process of making albums: "The first time around, you don't really know. All you do is you get this record deal and you're like whoa! Like, I'm signed! This is amazing! And you're just recording and before you know it the album's done. This time around, I had to think about so much more things, you know: edits, production things that I didn't like, going back and forth on mixing. ... I was very hands-on this time."

=== Music and lyrical content ===
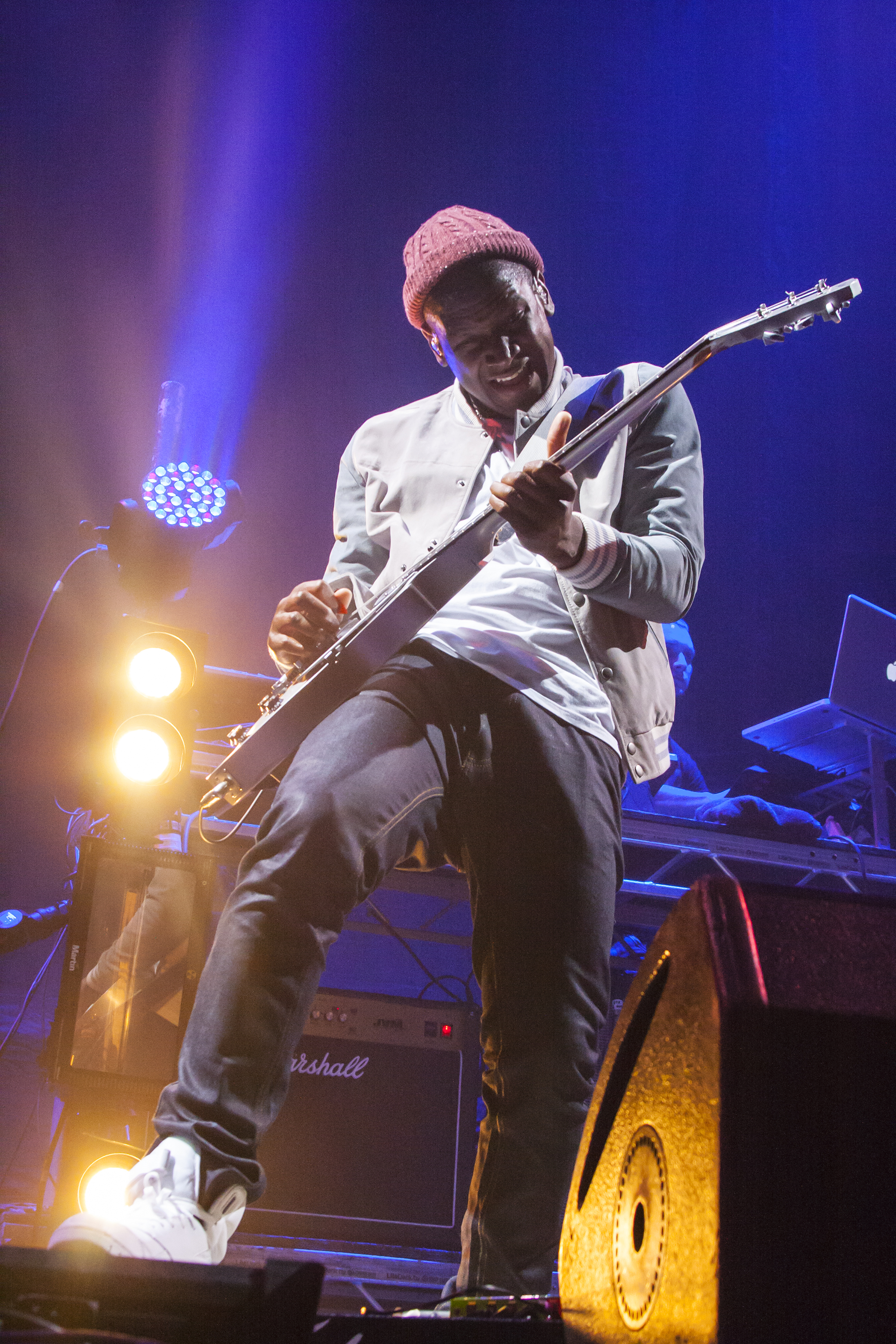
Frequent collaborator Labrinth features on "It's OK" and the album's third single "Lover Not a Fighter", both of which he wrote and produced. These songs lead on from "Pass Out", "Frisky" and "Earthquake".

"Someday (Place in the Sun)" is about how Tinie started in the cold, harsh streets of London and had to face many obstacles to get to where he is today (his 'place in the sun'). "Don't Sell Out" incorporates elements of Tamil music that meld into the hip hop and trap genres throughout the song. Tinie wrote it after hearing "Kalasala Kalasala" by Vaali and S. S. Thaman and thinking the words sounded like 'don't sell out'. Balistiq sampled the song and sent the track to Tinie, who used this as a basis for the song. He decided to create a song poking fun at the term "selling out", due to how frequently and foolishly it is used. "Looking Down the Barrel" follows on from where Disc-Overy track "Obsession" left off: it's the second track where Tempah's spoken his random thoughts on fame, life, relationships and success. He decided to fill the track with 'random retorts and different tangents he was going off on'. The song was produced by Tom Rowlands of The Chemical Brothers, and the song's sample was selected by Rowlands.

"Witch Doctor" is based on a true story where Tinie met a girl at a show whom he took with him on the tour bus and showed what it's like to live his life. "It's OK" and "Lover Not a Fighter" are two songs that feature vocals and production from Labrinth. "It's OK" is a contrast from the "intro and fun, random bouncy things" according to Okogwu. He added "it's very unorthodox in the sense that people wouldn't have heard or even expect us to make a song like this because it's very slow and ballad-y. It's very reminiscent to me of the Fugees or something because it just sounds different and very soulful as well." He wrote the song in Jamaica and wanted it to feel rustic and urban. Tinie wanted to "push the envelope" with what you're used to hearing from him and Labrinth. "Lover Not a Fighter" is a feel-good, radio-friendly song that incorporates hip hop and electronic music, along with rap rock, and is about good vibes and "doing your thing". "I'm a lover, not a fighter. I've just come to do my thing and enjoy myself so don't try and get on to me about it or try and make me feel bad about everything that's going on in my life", said Tinie to SB.TV.

"Tears Run Dry" was originally an instrumental by Crada and later on strings were added. The song is a 'venting' record, where Tinie shares personal thoughts and then turns into a heavier finale. According to Tinie it was amended about 37 times due to constant adjustments and improvements. "Lost Ones" is about a couple splitting up but trying to maintain their pride, and then realising that in reality they do regret it. Paloma Faith recorded an "eerie" vocal for the chorus. Apparently Tinie wanted a part of the album to be motivational, and conveys this with the songs "Children of the Sun", "A Heart Can Save the World" and "Heroes". Emeli Sandé features on "A Heart Can Save the World", and also wrote Laura Mvula's chorus for "Heroes". Sandé also appeared on the Disc-Overy track "Let Go". All three tracks are produced by Naughty Boy, a frequent collaborator with Sandé.

== Promotion ==
A series of short trailers for "Trampoline", getting gradually longer in length, teased different sections of the instrumental and music video. Each teaser features the Demonstration insignia, which is a horizontal red stripe going through the centre of the artwork. The first teaser was five seconds long and simply a synth and sub drop. The second is seventeen seconds long and shows a hanging microphone, accompanied by slightly more of the track. The third shows a hooded Tinie, accompanied by a different section of the track. At the end Tinie says "yeah". The fourth and final trailer was released a day prior to the premiere of the track, and includes part of the chorus. It shows Tinie walking up to the camera and grinning. The album artwork and artwork for each of the singles feature the red stripe, and even the colour two-tone vinyl has a red stripe going across it. The stripe also features on the physical disc. Tinie teamed up with Warner Music Group to develop the Tinie Tempah: Rap Demonstration app for the iTunes Store, released on 5 February 2014. The app uses recordings of Tempah's mouth rapping the album in its entirety, and the idea is that you can rap along to it.

Tinie appeared in several award ceremonies and TV shows to help promote the album. He performed a medley of "Lover Not a Fighter" and "Children of the Sun" at the 2014 BRIT Awards launch party, "Children of the Sun" at BBC Radio 1's Teen Awards, "Lover Not a Fighter" alongside Labrinth on The Graham Norton Show and solo on BBC's Live Lounge, as well as performing "Heroes" with Laura Mvula on The Jonathan Ross Show and the 2014 BAFTAs. The latter sparked reaction from the media because Tinie high fived Prince William mid-performance. At the ceremony the duo also presented the Best Original Music award.

=== Singles ===
The lead single from Demonstration, "Trampoline" was premiered on MistaJam's BBC Radio 1Xtra show on 2 July 2013. The lyric video was premiered shortly afterwards. It features 2 Chainz and is produced by Diplo. The song was released on 4 August 2013 in the United Kingdom, and peaked at number three in the UK Singles Chart making it his fourth most successful single to date. On 16 September, to promote his UK arena tour, the album track "Don't Sell Out" live at the O_{2} Arena was uploaded to O_{2}'s YouTube channel, before being made available to purchase via iTunes when you pre-ordered the album. The promotional video was shot in collaboration with Dockers and Complex and premiered on 8 October 2013 at a total length of 3 minutes and 11 seconds. The song entered the UK Singles Chart at number 70. The second single from the album, "Children of the Sun", featuring John Martin, premiered on Zane Lowe's BBC Radio 1 show on 12 September. It was released on 28 October 2013 in the United Kingdom. The track was produced by iSHi and reached number six on the UK Singles Chart. Upon the album's release, "Someday (Place in the Sun)" charted at number 87 and "It's OK" charted at number 180.

The album's third single, "Lover Not a Fighter", features Labrinth and was released on 2 February. The music video for the song was shot from 20 to 21 November 2013 and released on 12 December 2013. Due to the video release and airplay, the song rose up the UK Singles Chart to number 18 prior to independent release, later peaking at number 16. On 24 April 2014, the music video for a promotional single, "5 Minutes", premiered on YouTube. The album's fourth single, "Tears Run Dry", was released on 22 July 2014 following the premiere of its music video the previous day.

=== Tour ===
On 8 October, Tinie Tempah announced he was going on a UK and Ireland arena tour in support of Demonstration. He played eleven dates, beginning with Wolverhampton Civic Hall and finishing at The O_{2} Dublin. The tour was originally due to last from 2 to 18 December 2013, however it was rescheduled from 25 March to 9 April 2014 due to lack of preparation. Tour dates in Aberdeen, Glasgow, Leeds and Newcastle upon Tyne were cancelled altogether. He was supported by Big Sean, Krept and Konan and G FrSH.

List of UK & Ireland tour dates and venues
Date	City	Region	Venue
25 March 2014	Wolverhampton	United Kingdom	Wolverhampton Civic Hall
26 March 2014	Wolverhampton	United Kingdom	Wolverhampton Civic Hall
28 March 2014	Manchester	United Kingdom	O_{2} Apollo Manchester
29 March 2014	Manchester	United Kingdom	O_{2} Apollo Manchester
30 March 2014	London	United Kingdom	The O_{2} Arena
31 March 2014	Brighton	United Kingdom	Brighton Centre
2 April 2014	Nottingham	United Kingdom	Capital FM Arena
4 April 2014	Cardiff	United Kingdom	Motorpoint Arena
6 April 2014	Bournemouth	United Kingdom	BIC
7 April 2014	Liverpool	United Kingdom	Echo Arena
9 April 2014	Dublin	Ireland	The O_{2}

== Critical reception ==
Professional ratings
Aggregate scores
Source	Rating
Metacritic	69/100
Review scores
Source	Rating
AllMusic	4/5 stars
Digital Spy	3/5 stars
Gigwise	8/10 stars
The Guardian	4/5 stars
The Independent	2/5 stars
The Irish Times	3/5 stars
NME	6/10
The Observer	3/5 stars
The Telegraph	4/5 stars
Virgin Media	4/5 stars

Upon its release, Demonstration was met with generally favorable reviews from music critics. At Metacritic, which assigns a normalized rating out of 100 to reviews from mainstream critics, the album received an average score of 69, based on ten reviews. David Jeffries of AllMusic gave the album four out of five stars, commenting that "guest shots from Paloma Faith, Emeli Sandé, Dizzee Rascal, and others make this one crowded album, but figuring out what to drop is nearly impossible as everyone hits the mark." Gigwise's Nick Scott gave the album eight out of ten stars, saying that "It would be wrong to compare Disc-Overy to Demonstration; this is the Tinie Tempah of now. It is a statement of his evolution as an artist and how his maturity and experience have now made him better than ever." The Guardian's Caroline Sullivan gave the album four stars, describing the production as "stark electronics that recall his teen years as a grime MC" and describing some lyrics as "observant" and "sheer British genius". She questioned the commercial success of the album, claiming that "rather than creating radio-loving hooks, Tinie has expended his energies on honing lyrics and flow".

Chris Cottingham of NME gave the album six out of ten, saying that "Tinie is most definitely a star, second only to Dizzee Rascal on the UK scene, perhaps even above him following Dizzee's dismal ‘The Fifth’ album. So perhaps it's no surprise Tinie's brimming with confidence on record number two." However, Cottingham dismissed the quality of some lyrics as "all great fun for him, no doubt, but in the past he didn’t trade in this lowest common denominator stuff." Robert Copsey of Digital Spy gave the album three out of five stars, describing the album as "inoffensive grime-pop for the masses that makes all the right moves, but lacks any serious bite." Larry Day of musicOMH gave the album two and half out of five stars, commenting "this is a massive collaborative project. That's probably the reason it's such a chaotic, unwieldy mess." On the other hand, he praised the promotional single "Don't Sell Out", saying "crunchy handclaps and jerky hooks work a kiss of life on the record, and Tempah's lyrics are fascinating to listen to – he compares himself to Othello and nods to everything from the Queen to Celebrity Juice – if utterly misogynistic." Day concluded the review with "Tempah has gone from rapping with a knowing wink or a glint in his eye to unloading a lewd spiel sans wit."

== Commercial performance ==
Demonstration debuted at number three on the UK Albums Chart, behind The Marshall Mathers LP 2 by Eminem and the self-titled debut studio album by James Arthur. The record was eventually certified gold by the British Phonographic Industry, recognizing shipments of 100,000 shipments in the country. It additionally charted within the top 40 of several additional territories, surpassing the chart positions Disc-Overy held in several of them. The record debuted at number 13 in Ireland, eleven positions higher than its predecessor, and spent seven weeks on that chart. It reached number 22 in Australia (whereas Disc-Overy had peaked at number 96), and number 29 in Switzerland (whereas his previous album charted at number 73). However, it charted eight spots lower than Disc-Overy in New Zealand, having entered at number 40 in the country.

== Track listing ==
The album is available in four different editions: CD, digital download, 180 g vinyl LP and a 180 g two-tone vinyl LP limited to 500 copies worldwide.

Demonstration – Standard edition
No.	Title	Writer(s)	Producer(s)	Length
1.	"Someday (Place in the Sun)" (featuring Ella Eyre)	Patrick Okogwu; Eric Turner; Eshraque Mughal	iSHi	4:19
2.	"Trampoline" (featuring 2 Chainz)	Okogwu; Thomas Pentz; Derek Allen; Tauheed Epps	Diplo; DJA^{[a]}	3:46
3.	"Don't Sell Out"	Okogwu; Ryan Nile Sutherland; Andrew Stewart-Jones; Candice Pillay; Dwayne Abernathy; Vaali; S. S. Thaman	Balistiq	3:12
4.	"It's OK" (featuring Labrinth)	Okogwu; Timothy McKenzie	Labrinth	4:29
5.	"Mosh Pit" (featuring Dizzee Rascal and Ty Dolla $ign)	Okogwu; Ricardo Thomas; Will Kennard; Saul Milton; Tyrone Griffin	Rick Rock; Chase & Status^{[b]}	4:11
6.	"Looking Down the Barrel"	Okogwu; Tom Rowlands	Tom Rowlands	3:29
7.	"Children of the Sun" (featuring John Martin)	Okogwu; Mughal; John Martin; Michel Zitron; Måns Wredenberg	iSHi	4:13
8.	"Witch Doctor" (featuring Candice Pillay)	Okogwu; Pillay; Alexander Grant; Abernathy	Alex da Kid	3:07
9.	"Shape" (featuring Big Sean)	Okogwu; Pentz; Andrew Swanson; Sean Anderson	Diplo	4:05
10.	"Lover Not a Fighter" (featuring Labrinth)	Okogwu; McKenzie	Labrinth	3:28
11.	"A Heart Can Save the World" (featuring Emeli Sandé)	Okogwu; Shahid Khan; Emeli Sandé; James Murray; Mustafa Omer; Harry Craze; Hugo Chegwin	Naughty Boy; Craze & Hoax^{[b]}; Mojam^{[b]}	3:41
12.	"Tears Run Dry" (featuring Sway Clarke II)	Okogwu; Christian Kalla; Sway Clarke II; Steve Fernandez	Crada	5:03
13.	"Lost Ones" (featuring Paloma Faith)	Okogwu; Paloma Faith; Christopher Crowhurst; Khan	Naughty Boy; Chris Loco^{[a]}	4:38
14.	"Heroes" (featuring Laura Mvula)	Okogwu; Khan; Sandé; Craze; Chegwin	Naughty Boy; Craze & Hoax^{[b]}	3:44
15.	"5 Minutes" (hidden track)	Okogwu; Zane Lowe; Nathaniel J. Warner; Emmanuel Orelaja	Zane Lowe	6:11
Total length:				61:36

iTunes bonus tracks
No.	Title	Writer(s)	Producer(s)	Length
16.	"Do Till I"	Okogwu; Tee Splurgeboys; Tylie Splurgeboys	Splurgeboys	4:12
17.	"Tsunami (Jump)" (DVBBS and Borgeous featuring Tinie Tempah)	Alex van den Hoef; Chris van den Hoef; John Borger; Niles Hollowell-Dhar; Okogwu	DVBBS; Borgeous	2:39
Total length:				68:27

Demonstration – Japanese edition bonus tracks
No.	Title	Writer(s)	Producer(s)	Length
16.	"Trampoline" (featuring 2 Chainz) (MONSTA remix)	Okogwu; Pentz; Allen; Epps	Diplo; DJA^{[a]}	5:54
17.	"Trampoline" (featuring 2 Chainz) (Shift K3Y remix)	Okogwu; Pentz; Allen; Epps	Diplo; DJA^{[a]}	5:10
Total length:				72:40

Notes

- Track listing and credits from album booklet.
- ^{^a} signifies a co-producer
- ^{^b} signifies an additional producer
- "Don't Sell Out" features uncredited vocals from Candice Pillay.
- "5 Minutes" features uncredited vocals from J. Warner.

Sample credits

- "Don't Sell Out" contains samples of "Kalasala Kalasala", written and performed by Vaali and S. S. Thaman and featuring vocals by L. R. Eswari, T. Rajendar and Solar Sai Silambarasan.
- "Looking Down the Barrel" contains samples of "Betty Jean's Mama", written and performed by Gator Creek.
- "5 Minutes" contains samples of "Mama Said Knock You Out", written by Marley Marl and Bobby "Bobcat" Ervin and performed by LL Cool J and samples of "Hitz" written and performed by Chase & Status and Tinie Tempah.

== Personnel ==
=== Recording ===
- Audio mastering by Stuart Hawkes at Metropolis Mastering Studios in London, UK.
- Audio mastering for tracks 3 and 7 by Tom Coyne at Sterling Sound in New York, USA.

=== Management and creative ===
- Tim Blacksmith – executive producer
- Riki Bleu – executive producer
- Danny D – executive producer
- Richard Welland – artwork
- David Slijper – photography
- Joy Elton – commissioner

=== Vocals ===
- Tinie Tempah (all tracks)
- 2 Chainz (track 2)
- Big Sean (track 9)
- Candice Pillay (tracks 3 and 8)
- Dizzee Rascal (track 5)
- Ella Eyre (track 1)
- Emeli Sandé (track 11)
- Gator Creek (sampled vocals, track 7)
- J. Warner (track 15)
- John Martin (track 8)
- LL Cool J (sampled vocals, track 15)
- L. R. Eswari (sampled vocals, track 3)
- Labrinth (tracks 4 and 10)
- Laura Mvula (track 14)
- Paloma Faith (track 13)
- Sway Clarke II (track 12)
- Ty Dolla $ign (track 5)
- Michel Zitron (backing vocals, track 8)

=== Musicians and technicians ===
- Alex da Kid – producer
- Andrew Swanson – drum programming
- Aryan "Marz" Marzban – mixdown engineer, additional programming
- Balistiq (Ryan Nile Sutherland and Andrew Stewart-Jones) – producers
- Ben Harrison – guitars
- Charlie Bernado – programming
- Chase & Status (Will Kennard and Saul Milton) – additional production, mixdown engineers
- Chris Carmouche – mixdown engineer, additional programming
- Chris Galland – mixdown engineer
- Chris Loco – additional production
- Christian "Crada" Kalla – producer
- Christoph Hessler – guitars
- Craze & Hoax (Harry Craze and Hugo Chegwin) – producers, instruments, programming, recording technicians
- Da Digglar – programming
- Daniela Rivera – assistant mastering engineer
- Delbert Bowers – mixdown engineer
- Dem Jointz – programming
- Diplo – producer
- Erik Arvinder – violin, string arrangement
- Gary Fly – mixdown assistant
- iSHi – producer, grand piano, other instruments
- Jonny Coffer – strings
- Labrinth – producer
- Manny Marroquin – mixdown engineer
- Michel Zitron – recording technician
- Mojam (Mustafa Omer and James Murray) – producers, recording technicians, instruments, programming
- Naughty Boy – producer, recording technician, instruments, programming
- Nick Taylor – strings engineering
- Phil Tan – mixdown engineer
- Ricardo "Rick Rock" Thomas – producer
- Richard "Richie Montana" Hoey – recording technician
- Rob Swire – mixdown engineer
- Robert Vadadi – guitars
- Rosie Danvers – strings arranger
- S. S. Thaman – producer (sampled)
- Sönke Reich – additional drums
- Steve Dub – mixdown engineer
- Tom Rowlands – producer
- TommyD – strings
- Wez Clarke – mixdown engineer, additional programming
- Zane Lowe – producer

== Charts ==
Chart (2013)	Peak position
Australian Albums (ARIA)	22
Austrian Albums (Ö3 Austria)	66
Belgian Albums (Ultratop Flanders)	158
Belgian Albums (Ultratop Wallonia)	183
French Albums (SNEP)	41
German Albums (Offizielle Top 100)	80
Irish Albums (IRMA)	13
New Zealand Albums (RMNZ)	40
Scottish Albums (Official Charts)	5
Swiss Albums (Schweizer Hitparade)	29
UK Albums (Official Charts)	3
UK Album Downloads (Official Charts)	3
UK R&B Albums (Official Charts)	2

== Certifications ==
Region	Certification	Certified units/sales
United Kingdom (BPI)	Gold	139,664

== Release history ==
Region	Date	Format	Label
Australia	1 November 2013	Digital download; CD; vinyl	Parlophone; Disturbing London
New Zealand	1 November 2013	Digital download; CD; vinyl	Parlophone; Disturbing London
Belgium	1 November 2013	Digital download; CD; vinyl	Parlophone; Disturbing London
United Kingdom	4 November 2013	Digital download; CD; vinyl	Parlophone; Disturbing London
France	4 November 2013	Digital download; CD; vinyl	Parlophone; Disturbing London
Zimbabwe	4 November 2013	Digital download; CD; vinyl	Parlophone; Disturbing London
Japan	6 November 2013	Digital download; CD; vinyl	Parlophone; Disturbing London
Germany	8 November 2013	Digital download; CD; vinyl	Parlophone; Disturbing London
Worldwide	18 November 2013	Two-tone colour vinyl	Parlophone; Disturbing London
