= Children of the Sun (Tinie Tempah song) =

2013 single by Tinie Tempah

Single by Tinie Tempah featuring John Martin

from the album Demonstration
- Released: 25 October 2013
- Recorded: 2013
- Studio: Elevent Studios (Stockholm)
- Genre: Hip hop; power pop
- Length: 3:51 (radio edit); 4:14 (album version)
- Label: Parlophone; Disturbing London
- Songwriter(s): Patrick Okogwu; Eshraque Mughal; Charlie Bernado; John Martin; Michel Zitron; Måns Wredenberg
- Producer(s): iSHi

Tinie Tempah singles chronology
"Trampoline" (2013)	"Children of the Sun" (2013)	"Lover Not a Fighter" (2014)

John Martin singles chronology
""Reload"" (2013)	""Children of the Sun"" (2013)	""Anywhere For You"" (2014)

"Children of the Sun" is a song by English rapper Tinie Tempah, featuring additional vocals from Swedish singer John Martin. It was released on 25 October 2013 as the second single from Tempah's second studio album Demonstration (2013). The track was produced by Eshraque "iSHi" Mughal, who also wrote Tinie's hits "Written in the Stars", "Invincible", "Game Over" and "Angels & Stars". The song reached number six in the UK Singles Chart. The song contains two references to Michael Jackson, which included the moonwalk and the song "Black or White".

== Music video ==
The lyrics video for "Children of the Sun" premiered on Tinie Tempah's YouTube channel on 18 September 2013. The official video, directed by Jon Jon Augustavo premiered on 22 September 2013 with John Martin in the video, at a total length of five minutes and twenty seconds.

== Track listing ==
Digital download
No.	Title	Length
1.	"Children of the Sun" (Radio Edit)	3:51

CD single
No.	Title	Length
1.	"Children of the Sun" (Radio Edit)	3:51
2.	"Children of the Sun"	4:14
3.	"Children of the Sun" (Instrumental Edit)	3:51

== Personnel ==
- Patrick "Tinie Tempah" Okogwu – vocals
- John Martin – vocals
- Charlie Bernado – writer
- Michel Zitron – writer
- Måns Wredenberg – writer

Production

- Eshraque "iSHi" Mughal – production

== Charts ==
Chart (2013)	Peak position
Australia (ARIA)	74
Iceland (Tonlist)	29
Ireland (IRMA)	22
Norway (VG-lista)	19
Scotland (OCC)	6
Switzerland (Schweizer Hitparade)	47
UK Hip Hop/R&B (OCC)	2
UK Singles (OCC)	6

== Certifications ==
Region	Certification	Certified units/sales
United Kingdom (BPI)	Silver	200,000^{‡}
^{‡} Sales+streaming figures based on certification alone.

== Release history ==
Country	Release date	Format
Ireland	25 October 2013	Digital download
United Kingdom	28 October 2013	Digital download
