= Someday (Place in the Sun) =

Song by Tinie Tempah featuring Ella Eyre

from the album Demonstration
- Released: 1 November 2013
- Recorded: 2013
- Studio: R1 Studios (London); Metropolis Studios (London)
- Genre: British hip hop
- Length: 4:19
- Label: Parlophone; Disturbing London
- Songwriters: Patrick Okogwu; Eric Turner; Eshraque Mughal
- Producer: iSHi

"Someday (Place in the Sun)" is a song by English rapper Tinie Tempah, featuring additional vocals from British singer Ella Eyre and production from iSHi. It was released on 1 November 2013 as part of Tempah's second studio album Demonstration (2013). It entered the UK Singles Chart at number 87 and the UK R&B Chart at number fourteen but was never released as a single.

== Background and release ==
"Someday (Place in the Sun)" is about how Tinie started in the cold, harsh streets of London and had to face many obstacles to get to where he is today (his 'place in the sun'). The song was written by Tinie, Eric Turner and Eshraque Mughal (of "Written in the Stars" fame). The song was never released as a single but digital downloads of the individual track from Demonstration caused it to enter the UK Singles Chart at number 87 and the UK R&B Chart at number fourteen.

== Track listing ==
Album version
No.	Title	Length
1.	"Someday (Place in the Sun)" (featuring Ella Eyre)	4:19

== Personnel ==
- Patrick "Tinie Tempah" Okogwu – vocals
- Ella Eyre – vocals
- Eric Turner – writer
- Eshraque "iSHi" Mughal – producer, mixing, grand piano, other instruments
- Aryan "Marz" Marzban – mixing
- Erik Arvinder – violin
- Robert Vadadi – guitars
- Richard "Richie Montana" Hoey – vocal production, recording

== Charts ==
Chart (2014)	Peak position
UK Hip Hop/R&B (OCC)	14
UK Singles (OCC)	87

== Release history ==
Region	Date	Format	Label
Australia, New Zealand, Belgium	1 November 2013	Digital download	Parlophone; Disturbing London
United Kingdom, France, Zimbabwe	4 November 2013	Digital download	Parlophone; Disturbing London
Japan	6 November 2013	Digital download	Parlophone; Disturbing London
Germany, Switzerland	8 November 2013	Digital download	Parlophone; Disturbing London
