= Eshraque "iSHi" Mughal =

Swedish music producer and songwriter

iSHi
- Born: Eshraque Mughal; February 12, 1981 (age 45)
- Origin: Stockholm, Sweden
- Genres: Hip hop Dance-pop; R&B
- Occupations: Songwriter; Record producer Music executive
- Years active: 2007–present
- Labels: WHOiSHi; PRTOTYP
- Website: http://www.whoishi.com

Eshraque Mughal, better known by his stage name iSHi, is a Swedish music producer and songwriter.

== Life and career ==
In 2001 iSHi produced the music for The Lick TV show on MTV UK together with One Dread. He started working and spending more in the UK. In 2006, iSHi started working with a whole new project from scratch with rapper Lazee. Two years later, after releasing several singles and the album Setting Standards, iSHi and Lazee decided to go separate ways on good terms. After the summer 2009 he discovered singer Eric Turner. They started working together and later on iSHi signed him to his label 2Stripes Music. Later that year iSHi met British rapper Tinie Tempah. Tinie had just started working on his debut album Disc-Overy and flew over to Sweden to work with iSHi. The first song they did together was "Written in the Stars" featuring Eric Turner. The song became a worldwide hit and sold platinum in several countries including the United States. iSHi has also produced Tinie Tempah's 2013 single "Children Of The Sun" featuring John Martin and the Demonstration album track "Someday (Place in the Sun)".

iSHi has worked with artist such as Usher, Ne-Yo, Shakira, Lupe Fiasco, John Martin, Cheryl Cole, Avicii, Sebastian Ingrosso, Alexandra Burke, Emeli Sandé, Ella Eyre, Professor Green, Tinie Tempah and Wretch 32 among others.

== Production credits ==
Year	Song	Artist
2006	"Everything You're Not"	Darin
2006	"If You Wanna"	Darin
2006	"Top Of The World"	Agnes
2006	"Det Går Bra Nu"	Petter
2007	"Frustration"	Petter
2007	"Stor Stil"	Petter
2007	"Get By"	Petter
2007	"Fresh"	Petter
2008	"Rock Away"	Lazee
2008	"Drop Bombs"	Lazee
2008	"My Hero"	Lazee
2008	"Baby" (feat. Loon)	Lazee
2008	"Fastlife"	Lazee
2008	"Back To 85"	Lazee
2008	"All Across The World" (feat. Million Stylez)	Lazee
2008	"Setting Standards"	Lazee
2008	"Calling Out" (feat. Apollo Drive)	Lazee
2008	"I'm Not Pop"	Lazee
2008	"Hold On" (feat. Neverstore)	Lazee
2008	"Get To Know Me"	Lazee
2009	"Ride It (iSHi Remix)"	Jay Sean
2009	"Ride It (iSHi Desi Remix)"	Jay Sean
2009	"Brainwashed"	Devlin
2009	"Two Lives"	Example
2010	"Stronger"	Lazee
2010	"My Last Try" (feat. Eric Turner)	Tinchy Stryder
2010	"Game Over"	Tinchy Stryder
2010	"Stereo Sun" (feat. Eric Turner)	Tinchy Stryder
2011	"Written In The Stars" (feat. Eric Turner)	Tinie Tempah
2011	"Snap"	Tinie Tempah
2011	"Just A Little" (feat. Range)	Tinie Tempah
2011	"Invincible" (feat. Kelly Rowland)	Tinie Tempah
2011	"Break The Chain" (feat. Eric Turner & Sway)	Lupe Fiasco
2011	"Sane's The New Mad"	Wretch 32
2011	"Don't Be Afraid" (feat. Delilah)	Wretch 32
2011	"Read All About It" (feat. Emeli Sandé)	Professor Green
2011	"Fire"	Alexandra Burke
2012	"Angels & Stars" (feat. Lupe Fiasco & Tinie Tempah)	Eric Turner
2012	"Stylechanger" (feat. Kardinal Offishall, Wretch 32 & Professor Green)	Eric Turner
2012	"Dancing in My Head"	Eric Turner
2013	"Next To Me (iSHi Remix)" (feat. Kendrick Lamar)	Emeli Sandé
2013	"Children Of The Sun" (feat. John Martin)	Tinie Tempah
2013	"Someday (Place in the Sun)" (feat. Ella Eyre)	Tinie Tempah
2015	"Push It" (feat. Pusha T)	iSHi
2017	"Pick Up the Phone" (feat. Eric Turner)	Lupe Fiasco

== Albums ==
- Spring Pieces (February 8, 2016)
- PRTOTYP (September 9, 2026)
- PRTOTYP II (September 20, 2026)

== Singles ==
- We Run (feat. French Montana, Wale & Raekwon)
