= Don't Sell Out =

Promotional single by Tinie Tempah featuring Candice Pillay

from the album Demonstration
- Released: 25 September 2013
- Recorded: 2013; R1 Studios (London)
- Genre: British hip hop; trap; Bollywood
- Length: 3:12
- Label: Parlophone; Disturbing London
- Songwriter(s): Patrick Okogwu; Ryan Nile Sutherland; Andrew Stewart-Jones; Candice Pillay; Dwayne Abernathy; Vaali; S. S. Thaman
- Producer(s): Balistiq

"Don't Sell Out" is a song by English rapper Tinie Tempah, featuring additional vocals from South African singer and rapper Candice Pillay and production from Balistiq. It was released on 25 September 2013 as a promotional single from Tempah's second studio album Demonstration (2013). It entered the UK Singles Chart at number 70.

== Background and release ==
"Don't Sell Out" was written by Tinie after hearing "Kalasala Kalasala" by Vaali and S. S. Thaman and thinking the words sounded like 'don't sell out'. Balistiq sampled the song and sent the track to Tinie, who used this as a basis for the song. He decided to create a song poking fun at the term "selling out", due to how frequently and foolishly it is used. The song was released on 25 September 2013 as an instant download when you pre-ordered Demonstration, and managed to enter the UK Singles Chart at number 70.

== Music video ==
A live video for the song was shot during a soundcheck at the O_{2} Arena and was uploaded to O_{2}'s YouTube channel on 16 September 2013. It lasts a total length of 3 minutes and 39 seconds. The promotional video was shot in collaboration with Dockers and Complex and premiered on 8 October 2013 at a total length of 3 minutes and 11 seconds.

== Track listing ==
Album version
No.	Title	Length
1.	"Don't Sell Out" (featuring Candice Pillay)	3:12

== Personnel ==
- Patrick "Tinie Tempah" Okogwu – vocals
- Candice Pillay – vocals
- Balistiq (Ryan Nile Sutherland and Andrew Stewart-Jones) – production
- Chris Carmouche – mixing
- Gary Fly – mixing
- Richard "Richie Montana" Hoey – vocal production, recording

== Chart performance ==
=== Weekly charts ===
Chart (2014)	Peak position
UK Hip Hop/R&B (OCC)	20
UK Singles (OCC)	70
