= Adel Dahdal =

Record producer and mix engineer

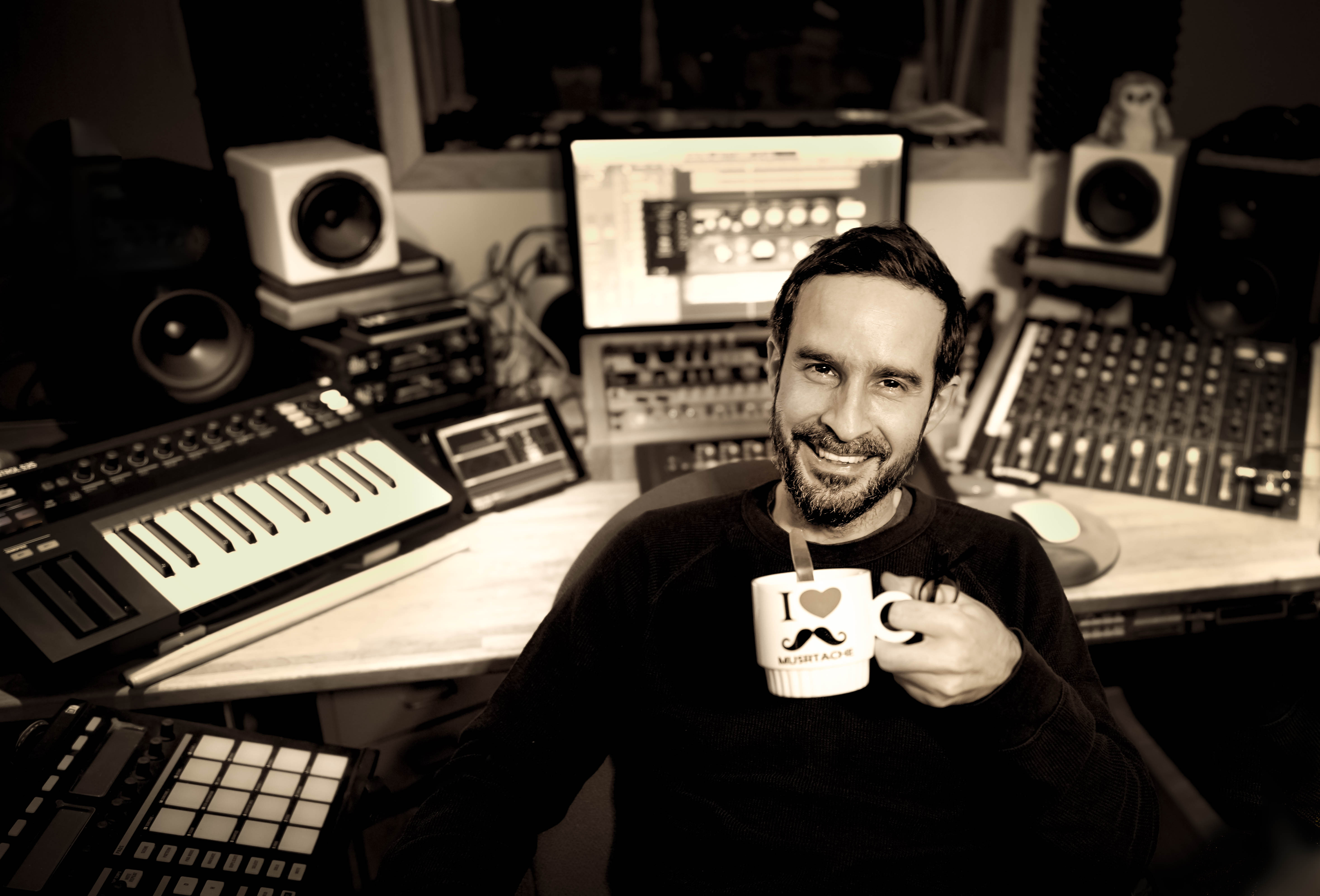
- Dahdal in 2019

Background information
- Born: Sydney, Australia
- Origin: Stockholm, Sweden
- Occupations: Record producer, mixing engineer, recording engineer, musician
- Website: http://www.adeldahdal.com

Adel Dahdal is a record producer and mix engineer based in Stockholm, Sweden. His credits include work with artists such as Neiked, Sandro Cavazza, Zara Larsson, Miriam Bryant, The Sounds, UNDRESSD, Liamoo, Rikard Wolff, Rudimental (Neiked Remix), Ace Wilder, Martin Stenmarck, Krezip, Titiyo and Anton Hagman among others.

== Mixing ==
In recent years, Adel is increasingly specializing in mixing, where some of his more notable mixing work includes the multi-platinum awarded single "High With Somebody" by Sandro Cavazza, Miriam Bryants highly successful debut album "Raised In Rain", music collective Neikeds debut album Best Of Hard Drive and the mulit-platinum streamed cover of the song "Forever Young" by the band UNDRESSD, which he also co-produced.

== Background ==
Adel first gained experience as an audio engineer in the studios of Per Gessles (of Roxette) music publishing and production label Jimmy Fun Music, where he first started as an A&R and then transitioned into working mainly in the in-house studios as an engineer and producer. Initially mainly engineering recordings for artists such as Lamont Dozier, Atomic Swing, Peter Jöback and Jerry Williams. His first commercial release as a music producer was the album "Living In America" by Swedish band The Sounds, which he co-produced with producer ShootingStar (Jimmy Monell). The album reached multi-platinum sales and also earned the band a Grammy award for best newcomer of the year in the Swedish Grammys 2003. Other notable album productions by Adel is the gold-awarded album "Plug It In" by Dutch band Krezip, the album "Härifrån Ser Jag Allt" by Swedish artist Martin Stenmarck and the album "Första Lågan" by Swedish actor/artist Rikard Wolff.

Adel is also a founding member of the band Street Fighting Man.
