= Dancing in My Head =

- Tom Hangs Remix cover

Single by Eric Turner vs. Avicii
- Released: 4 November 2012
- Recorded: 2012
- Genre: Pop (Eric Turner): Electro house; progressive house (Tom Hangs Remix/Avicii's Been Cursed Mix)
- Length: 3:52 (original version); 5:32 (Avicii's Been Cursed mix); 3:17 (Tom Hangs remix)
- Label: Capitol
- Songwriter(s): Eric Turner; Eshraque Mughal; Tim Bergling
- Producer(s): iSHi; Avicii

Eric Turner singles chronology
| "Stylechanger" (2012) | "Dancing in My Head" (2012) | "Bop Bop" (2015) |

Avicii singles chronology
| "Last Dance" (2012) | "Dancing in My Head" (2012) | "I Could Be the One" (2012) |

Music video
- "Dancing in My Head (Tom Hangs Remix)" on YouTube

"Dancing in My Head" is a song by American recording artist Eric Turner. Originally co-written and produced by frequent production partner Eshraque "iSHi" Mughal, the song featured Swedish DJ Avicii (while also using his alias Tom Hangs). His two remixes are known as the "Avicii's Been Cursed" Mix (the club mix version) and the Tom Hangs Remix (the radio edit version). Both remixes were released as individual downloadable tracks. A music video was made for the Tom Hangs remix (the intro uses a portion of the Avicii's Been Cursed Mix), and lyric videos were also made for both remixes. All of the videos were published to YouTube through Eric Turner's Vevo channel, including a behind-the-scenes video for the music video. The song reached number 188 in the UK.

== Track listing ==
All songs written and composed by Eric Turner and Eshraque "iSHi" Mughal.

CD single (Eric Turner)
| No. | Title | Writer(s) | Additional Production | Length |
|---|---|---|---|---|
| 1. | "Dancing In My Head" (Tom Hangs Remix) (Eric Turner vs. Avicii) | Turner; Mughal; Bergling | Tim Bergling | 3:17 |
| 2. | "Dancing In My Head" (Avicii's Been Cursed Mix) (Eric Turner vs. Avicii) | Turner; Mughal; Bergling | Tim Bergling | 5:32 |
| 3. | "Dancing In My Head" (Main) | Turner; Mughal | | 3:52 |
| 4. | "Dancing In My Head" (Instrumental) | | | 3:50 |
| 5. | "Still Dancing In My Head" (Charlie Bernardo Radio Edit) | Turner; Mughal; Bernardo | Charlie Bernardo | 3:21 |
| 6. | "Still Dancing In My Head" (Charlie Bernardo Remix) | Turner; Mughal; Bernardo | Charlie Bernardo | 4:16 |

Digital download (Eric Turner vs. Avicii)
| No. | Title | Writer(s) | Additional Production | Length |
|---|---|---|---|---|
| 1. | "Dancing In My Head" (Tom Hangs Remix) (Eric Turner vs. Avicii) | Turner; Mughal; Bergling | Tim Bergling | 3:17 |
| 2. | "Dancing In My Head" (Avicii's Been Cursed Mix) (Eric Turner vs. Avicii) | Turner; Mughal; Bergling | Tim Bergling | 5:32 |
| 3. | "Dancing In My Head" | Turner; Mughal | | 3:52 |
| 4. | "Still Dancing In My Head" (Charlie Bernardo Remix) | Turner; Mughal; Bernardo | Charlie Bernardo | 4:16 |
| 5. | "Dancing In My Head" (Michael Woods Club Mix) | Turner; Mughal; Woods | Michael Woods | 6:16 |

Remixes (Eric Turner vs. Avicii)
| No. | Title | Writer(s) | Additional Production | Length |
|---|---|---|---|---|
| 1. | "Dancing In My Head" (Avicii's Been Cursed Mix) (Eric Turner vs. Avicii) | Turner; Mughal; Bergling | Tim Bergling | 5:35 |
| 2. | "Still Dancing In My Head" (Charlie Bernardo Remix) | Turner; Mughal; Bernardo | Charlie Bernardo | 4:18 |
| 3. | "Still Dancing In My Head" (Charlie Bernardo Radio Edit) | Turner; Mughal; Bernardo | Charlie Bernardo | 3:23 |
| 4. | "Dancing In My Head" (Michael Woods Club Mix) | Turner; Mughal; Woods | Michael Woods | 6:19 |
| 5. | "Dancing In My Head" (Michael Woods Radio Mix) | Turner; Mughal; Woods | Michael Woods | 4:02 |
| 6. | "Dancing In My Head" (Original Version) | Turner; Mughal | | 3:52 |

== Charts ==
Chart performance for "Dancing in My Head"
| Chart (2012) | Peak position |
|---|---|
| Global Dance Songs (Billboard) | 38 |
| Netherlands (Tipparade) | 14 |
| UK Dance Chart (OCC) | 37 |
| UK Singles (OCC) | 188 |
| US Dance Club Songs (Billboard) | 7 |
| US Dance/Electronic Digital Song Sales (Billboard) | 39 |
| US Hot Dance/Electronic Songs (Billboard) | 27 |
