= Sway Clarke II =

Canadian singer-songwriter

Sway Clarke is a Toronto born, Berlin based singer/songwriter. Upon his introduction, his music was compared to Frank Ocean, Lorde, Miguel, The Weeknd, Mikky Ekko and Coldplay.

Sway Clarke's debut came as a featured vocalist and songwriter on "Tears Run Dry" on Tinie Tempah's 2013 release Demonstration.

Shortly after the release of Demonstration, Sway Clarke released his first solo song "I Don't Need Much". It was written by Sway Clarke and Fernandez, produced by Nikolai Potthoff and mixed by Sven Ludwig. The song was praised by popular blogs including Pigeons and Planes, The Line of Best Fit, EarMilk, IndieShuffle, as well as The FADER who hailed Sway Clarke II as "R&B's next big internet stud".

Signed to Capitol/Island Records in 2015, he released a mix tape of 90's cover songs entitled "QUIET. IT'S MY 90s MIX TAPE" in February 2016. In May 2016 he released his first EP "BAD LOVE" and then in August 2016 released the remix EP "BAD LOVE".

He is now (2019) part of the German Duo Ricky Dietz, while the other part Peter Fox is the well known german artist and frontman of the band Seeed.
