= Street Fighting Man (band) =

Swedish-American rock band based in Stockholm, Sweden

- Origin: Stockholm, Sweden
- Genres: Rock
- Years active: 2007–present
- Label: Idea of Control
- Members: Eric Turner; Adel Dahdal; Henrik Holmlund
- Website: http://streetfightingman.net

Street Fighting Man is a Swedish-American rock band based in Stockholm, Sweden.

== History ==
Street Fighting Man started as an idea between friends Adel Dahdal and Eric Turner. The band was formed in 2006 and the line-up finalized in early 2007 when Henrik Holmlund joined on drums. Since then the band has had a series of rotating "deputy members" on bass, piano and rhythm guitar.

The band has played a handful of shows at clubs in Stockholm (Landet, Trädgården, Mosebacke, Debaser, Sommar!) as well as the Peace & Love and Rookie festivals. In April 2010 Street Fighting Man opened for The Sounds at Debaser Medis in Stockholm.

Street Fighting Man has released two singles to date: "Raise It" and "Learning to Die", and one studio album: "The Shadow", which was recorded together with producer Patrik Berger, and released in early 2011.

Eric Turner also appeared on the single "Written in the Stars" with UK Rapper Tinie Tempah, released in September 2010. He also co-wrote the song, this song peaked at #1 on the UK and Ireland singles chart, and stars in Tinchy Stryder's album Third Strike, in two songs.

== Members ==
- Eric Turner – vocals
- Adel Dahdal – guitar
- Henrik Holmlund – drums

== Discography ==
Singles:

- Raise It (2008)
- Learning to Die (2010)

Albums:

- The Shadow (2011)
