= Lover Not a Fighter =

Single by Tinie Tempah featuring Labrinth

from the album Demonstration
- Released: 2 February 2014
- Studio: R1 Studios (London)
- Length: 3:17 (radio edit); 3:28 (album version)
- Label: Parlophone; Disturbing London
- Songwriters: Patrick Okogwu; Timothy McKenzie
- Producer: Labrinth

Tinie Tempah singles chronology
"Children of the Sun" (2013)	"Lover Not a Fighter" (2014)	"Tsunami (Jump)" (2014)

Labrinth singles chronology
"Playing with Fire" (2012)	"Lover Not a Fighter" (2014)	"Let It Be" (2014)

"Lover Not a Fighter" is a song by English rapper Tinie Tempah, featuring additional vocals from Labrinth, who also produced the song. It was released on 2 February 2014 as the third single from Tempah's second studio album Demonstration (2013).

The song entered the UK Singles Chart at number 42 and rose to number 18 prior to independent release. During 2014, an instrumental version of the song was used on Match of the Day 2 as background music to highlights of Saturday's matches.

== Background and release ==
"Lover Not a Fighter" is a feel-good, radio-friendly song about good vibes and 'doing your thing'. "I'm a lover, not a fighter. I've just come to do my thing and enjoy myself so don't try and get on to me about it or try and make me feel bad about everything that's going on in my life", Tinie told SB.TV. Prior to independent release, the song has been added to BBC Radio 1's B List playlist, receiving frequent airplay throughout December 2013 and January 2014.

The release of the music video caused a surge in popularity and the song entered the UK Singles Chart at number 42 on the week ending 18 January 2014. The Paul Woolford remix premiered on Annie Mac's BBC Radio 1 show on 17 January. The All About She remix premiered on MistaJam's BBC Radio 1Xtra show on 20 January 2014, and both are part of the remix package, released on 2 February. On the week ending 1 February, the song climbed the chart to number 18. On 4 February, Tinie appeared in BBC Radio 1's Live Lounge to perform the song alongside covers of Gorgon City and MNEK's "Ready for Your Love" and Meridian Dan's "German Whip".

== Music video ==
The music video for the song was shot from 20–21 November 2013 and released onto Tinie Tempah's YouTube channel on 12 December 2013. The video was directed by Emil Nava and lasts a total length of four minutes and fourteen seconds.

== Track listing ==
Digital download
No.	Title	Length
1.	"Lover Not a Fighter" (featuring Labrinth) (Radio Edit)	3:17
2.	"Lover Not a Fighter" (featuring Labrinth) (All About She Remix)	4:55
3.	"Lover Not a Fighter" (featuring Labrinth) (Paul Woolford Remix)	6:15
4.	"It's OK" (featuring Labrinth) (Kids of the Apocalypse Remix)	5:26
Total length:		19:53

== Personnel ==
- Patrick "Tinie Tempah" Okogwu – vocals
- Timothy "Labrinth" McKenzie – vocals, producer, instruments
- Da Digglar – additional programming
- Phil Tan – mixing
- Daniela Rivera – engineering
- Richard "Richie Montana" Hoey – vocal production, recording

== Charts ==
Chart (2014)	Peak position
Ireland (IRMA)	30
Scotland (OCC)	16
UK Hip Hop/R&B (OCC)	5
UK Singles (OCC)	16
