= Trampoline (Tinie Tempah song) =

Single by Tinie Tempah featuring 2 Chainz

from the album Demonstration
- Released: 5 July 2013
- Genre: British hip hop; trap
- Length: 3:46
- Label: Parlophone; Disturbing London
- Songwriters: Patrick Okogwu; Tauheed Epps; Thomas Pentz; Derek Allen
- Producers: Diplo; DJA

Tinie Tempah singles chronology
"Drinking from the Bottle" (2013)	"Trampoline" (2013)	"Children of the Sun" (2013)

2 Chainz singles chronology
"Feds Watching" (2013)	"Trampoline" (2013)	"When I Feel Like It" (2013)

"Trampoline" is the lead single from British Nigerian rapper Tinie Tempah's second studio album, Demonstration (2013). Released on 4 August 2013, the song features an additional rap verse from American rapper 2 Chainz. It debuted at number three in UK Singles Chart on 11 August 2013.

== Background and release ==
A series of short trailers for "Trampoline", getting gradually longer in length, teased different sections of the instrumental and music video. Each teaser features the symbolic red stripe, which is included in the official cover artwork for the single. The first teaser, done in a Southern US style of production, was five seconds long and simply a synth and sub drop. It uses a brand new Tinie Tempah logo, and Tinie's website "shook" as a reference to the "shake, shake, shake" in the song. The second is seventeen seconds long and shows a hanging microphone, accompanied by slightly more of the track. The third shows a hooded Tinie, accompanied by a different section of the track. At the end Tinie says "yeah". The fourth and final trailer was released a day prior to the premiere of the track, and includes part of the chorus. It shows Tinie walking up to the camera and grinning.

The track received its world premiere on 2 July 2013 on MistaJam's BBC Radio 1Xtra show. Tinie said that the track got its inspiration from the fact that he always jumps high on stage, and people always comment on it. "Trampoline" was created to be fun, bouncy and a fresh start after two years without putting out a solo single. Shortly afterwards, the full lyric video was premiered and the single was made available to preorder on iTunes. The song was released on 5 July in the United States. The Shift K3Y remix was released as a single on Beatport on 22 July, charting at number one in the hip-hop releases category. It featured as the first track in SB.TV's "SB.TV Beats" series.

When interviewed, Tinie said the following about the track:

"I didn't want to over-think the first single too much but I knew it had to be a transition between the first and second album. I describe it as being like a climax."

== Music video ==
The lyrics video for "Trampoline" premiered on Tinie Tempah's Vevo channel on 2 July 2013 with no 2 Chainz in the video. The official video premiered on 29 July 2013 with 2 Chainz in the video.

Production on the video was done by director Dawn Shadforth for the agency Sonny London, with the final color grading and post-production performed by Framestore.

== Remixes and covers ==
On 14 August 2013, a freestyle-remix of "Trampoline" was released by Nigerian musician Slim Burna.

Maxsta released a freestyle in celebration of his single "Wanna Go" on 16 August 2013.

ETC!ETC!, Grandtheft and RiFF RAFF teamed up to produce an official remix, produced in the Mad Decent studios. The remix was allowed by the song's producer Diplo. It was released for free on 24 October 2013. This remix uses the same alternate a cappella as the Dot Jr remix.

== Track listing ==
Digital download
No.	Title	Length
1.	"Trampoline"	3:45
2.	"Trampoline" (I See MONSTAS Remix)	5:54
3.	"Trampoline" (Shift K3Y Remix)	5:10
4.	"Trampoline" (Instrumental Edit)	3:44

== Chart performance ==
=== Weekly charts ===
Chart (2013)	Peak position
Australia (ARIA)	61
Belgium (Ultratip Bubbling Under Flanders)	55
Ireland (IRMA)	29
Scottish Singles Sales (Official Charts)	4
UK Singles (Official Charts)	3

=== Year-end charts ===
Chart (2013)	Position
UK Singles (Official Charts Company)	111

== Certifications ==
Region	Certification	Certified units/sales
United Kingdom (BPI)	Silver	200,000^{‡}
^{‡} Sales+streaming figures based on certification alone.

== Credits and personnel ==
- Patrick "Tinie Tempah" Okogwu – vocals
- Tauheed "2 Chainz" Epps – vocals

Production

- Thomas Wesley "Diplo" Pentz – production
- Derek "DJA" Allen – production

== Release history ==
Country	Release date	Format
Ireland	2 August 2013	Digital download
United Kingdom	4 August 2013	Digital download
United States	5 July 2013	Digital download
