= CMC$ =

Dutch musician, DJ and record producer

CMC$1
- Birth name: Yael Nahar
- Born: Amsterdam, Netherlands
- Origin: Amsterdam, Netherlands
- Genres: Future bass; futurepop; trap; house
- Occupations: Musician; DJ; record producer
- Instruments: Digital audio workstation; keyboards
- Years active: 2013–present
- Labels: Mad Decent; Stmpd Rcrds; Spinnin'
- Website: www.cmcsmusic.com

Yael Nahar, better known by his stage name CMC$ (an abbreviation for See Me Counting Stacks, pronounced "CMCS"), is a Dutch musician, DJ and record producer. He gained recognition for his collaboration with DVBBS titled "Not Going Home".

== Career ==
Nahar produces various musical styles including hip-hop, R&B, soul combined with bubbling, moombahton and house. He went to Herman Brood Academie production school together with fellow Dutch DJ Martin Garrix. He has released music on Spinnin' Records, Mad Decent and Barong Family. His first single "Wake Up Call" reached number four on the iTunes charts. With Kriss Kross Amsterdam he launched a "running track" collaboration between Spotify and Spinnin' Records. He produces future bass, trap, and future pop.

He collaborated with DVBBS to release "Not Going Home" as a single, featuring vocalist Gia Koka. In 2017, he released "Keys" as a single, featuring vocals by Jalise Romy. On 10 August 2018 he released his long-awaited collaboration with GRX (Martin Garrix) and Swedish singers Icona Pop. The track is in the style "Future Bass" and is CMC$'s most common genre of music. He is mostly known in his homeland but also in the United Kingdom because of his father, who was born and raised in Douglas.

== Discography ==
=== Singles ===
==== As lead artist ====
Title	Year	Peak chart positions					Certifications	Album
Title	Year	NL	BEL	CAN	US Dance	US Airplay	Certifications	Album
"Hypo" (with Sin City Status featuring Lucid)	2014	—	—	—	—	—		Non-album singles
"Wake Up Call" (featuring Lucid)	2015	—	—	—	—	—		Non-album singles
"Wish" (featuring Juliette Claire)	2015	—	—	—	—	—		Non-album singles
"Not Going Home" (with DVBBS featuring Gia Koka)	2016	83	38	58	19	39	MC: 2× Platinum	Beautiful Disaster
"Won't Let You Go"	2017	—	—	—	—	—		Non-album singles
"Keys" (featuring Jalise Romy)	2017	—	—	—	—	—		Non-album singles
"Understand Me" (with Conor Maynard)	2017	—	—	—	—	—		Non-album singles
"Parallel Lines" (with DVBBS featuring Happy Sometimes)	2017	—	—	—	—	—	MC: Gold	Blood of My Blood
"Those Lights" (featuring Stevie Appleton)	2017	—	—	—	—	—		Non-album singles
"Thinkin' Bout Myself" (with CADE)	2017	—	—	—	—	—		Non-album singles
"Love Parade" (featuring Jenny March)	2018	—	—	—	—	—		Non-album singles
"Baller" (with Crossnaders)	2018	—	—	—	—	—		Non-album singles
"X's" (with GRX featuring Icona Pop)	2018	—	—	—	36	—		Non-album singles
"Time Machine" (featuring Happy Sometimes and 5$Shake)	2019	—	—	—	—	—		Non-album singles
"Stupid Dumb" (featuring Svea)	2020	—	—	—	—	—		Non-album singles
"Nobody But You" (with Asher Angel)	2020	—	—	—	—	—		Non-album singles
"Oh Mama" (featuring Gia Koka)	2021	—	—	—	—	—		Non-album singles
"Faith" (with Henri PFR featuring Laura White)	2021	—	—	—	—	—		Non-album singles
"Dirty Talk" (with Sam Feldt)	2023	—	—	—	—	—		Non-album singles
"—" denotes releases that did not chart or were not released in that territory.

==== As featured artist ====
Title	Year	Album
"As Long As I'm With You" (Omi featuring CMC$)	2018	TBA

=== Remixes ===
==== 2015 ====
- Lady Bee featuring Rochelle – "Return of the Mack" (CMC$ Remix)
- Kris Kross Amsterdam and Choco – "Until The Morning" (CMC$ Remix)

==== 2018 ====
- Martin Garrix and David Guetta (featuring Jamie Scott and Romy Dya) - "So Far Away" (CMC$ Remix)

==== 2019 ====
- CMC$ – "Time Machine" (CMC$ and B3rror VIP Edit)
