= Not Going Home =

2016 single by DVBBS & CMC$

Single by DVBBS and CMC$ featuring Gia Koka

from the EP Beautiful Disaster
- Released: November 18, 2016
- Genre: Indie pop, electropop, EDM
- Length: 3:16
- Label: B1
- Composers: Yael Nahar; Gia Koronowska; Alexandre van den Hoef; Christopher van den Hoef
- Producers: CMC$; DVBBS

DVBBS singles chronology
| "Ur on My Mind" (2016) | "Not Going Home" (2016) | "Without U" (2017) |

CMC$ singles chronology
| "Wish" (2015) | "Not Going Home" (2016) | "Won't Let You Go" (2017) |

Music video
- "Not Going Home" on YouTube

"Not Going Home" is a song by Canadian electronic duo DVBBS and Dutch DJ and music producer CMC$, featuring vocals from Polish singer-songwriter Gia Koka. The song was written by Gia Koka, CMC$ and DVBBS, with production handled by the latter two. It was released to digital retailers on November 18, 2016, as the third single from DVBBS' third extended play, Beautiful Disaster.

== Background ==
"'Not Going Home' is sort of an anthem, a reminder that we all have roots and we all come the same place. For some home is where the heart is and for others home is where the music is," DVBBS said.

== Music video ==
The music video was released on March 14, 2017. The video shows DVBBS and Gia Koka walking around in Los Angeles, plastering "Not Going Home" stickers.

== Critical reception ==
Markos Papadatos of Digital Journal wrote that the song "has a feel-good and liberating vibe to it, coupled with a catchy beat". Connor Jones of We Got This Covered wrote: "A mellow synth pluck kicks things off with a soothing chord progression alongside minimal beats, before the pace picks up in the drops with staccato bass stabs and upbeat rhythms. The song balances some catchy female vocal hooks courtesy of Gia Koka, layered over an uplifting dance backdrop."

== Charts ==
=== Weekly charts ===
| Chart (2017) | Peak position |
|---|---|
| Belgium (Ultratip Bubbling Under Wallonia) | 38 |
| Canada (Canadian Hot 100) | 52 |
| Netherlands (Single Top 100) | 83 |
| US Hot Dance/Electronic Songs (Billboard) | 19 |

=== Year-end charts ===
| Chart (2017) | Position |
|---|---|
| US Hot Dance/Electronic Songs (Billboard) | 63 |

== Certifications ==
| Region | Certification | Certified units/sales |
|---|---|---|
| Canada (Music Canada) | 2× Platinum | 160,000^{‡} |
^{‡} Sales+streaming figures based on certification alone.
