= Tsunami (Dvbbs and Borgeous song) =

2013 single by DVBBS and Borgeous

Single by DVBBS and Borgeous
- Released: September 9, 2013
- Genre: Big room house
- Length: 3:57
- Label: Doorn; Spinnin'
- Songwriter: Niles Hollowell-Dhar
- Producer: KSHMR

DVBBS singles chronology
"We Know" (2013)	"Tsunami" (2013)	"Stampede" (2013)

Borgeous singles chronology
"Tsunami" (2013)	"Stampede" (2013)

Music video
- "Tsunami" on YouTube

"Tsunami" is a song released by Canadian electronic music duo DVBBS and American DJ Borgeous, produced and written by KSHMR. It was released as a single on September 9, 2013 on the Dutch label Doorn Records.

It is considered one of the most popular big room house songs of all-time along with "Animals" by Martin Garrix, "Epic" by Sandro Silva and Quintino, "Spaceman" by Hardwell and "Tremor" by Dimitri Vegas & Like Mike and Martin Garrix.

This song is also the Philadelphia Phillies home run song.

== Background ==
The creator of the track "Tsunami" was initially unknown. The single, which had been widely played at festivals for months, had been released and promoted by DJ Sander van Doorn, although he denied being the producer.

Radio DJ Pete Tong confirmed the song to be the work of DVBBS and Borgeous when he played it on his show on BBC Radio 1 on August 16, 2013. Billboard magazine called it "the most played tune at [2013's] Tomorrowland", a Belgian electronic music festival. It was officially released on Doorn Records on August 19, 2013.

A week later, it reached number one on the Beatport 100.

In 2014, Army Football used "Tsunami" for its kick off song for home games per recommendation of Army Football S&C staff (Tim Caron, Will Greenberg, Darren Mustin, Brian Philips). Starting in the 2015–16 NHL season, the Vancouver Canucks play "Tsunami" whenever forward Jared McCann scores a goal at Rogers Arena, as part of their system of using personalized goal songs for each player.

Starting in the 2019 MLB season, the Philadelphia Phillies play "Tsunami" whenever a Phillie hits a home run.

The Jay Cosmic remix of "Tsunami" is the entrance song for Toronto Blue Jays pitcher Jordan Romano.

Played during football games, especially during kickoffs, by cadets of United States Military Academy at West Point, New York.

== Charts ==
=== Weekly charts ===
Chart (2013–2014)	Peak position
Austria (Ö3 Austria Top 40)	14
Belgium (Ultratop 50 Flanders)	1
Belgium (Ultratop Flanders Dance)	1
Belgium (Ultratop 50 Wallonia)	1
Belgium (Ultratop Wallonia Dance)	1
Canada Hot 100 (Billboard)	80
Denmark (Tracklisten)	8
Finland (Suomen virallinen lista)	9
France (SNEP)	3
Germany (GfK)	14
Hungary (Dance Top 40)	2
Hungary (Single Top 40)	6
Netherlands (Dutch Top 40)	1
Netherlands (Mega Dance Top 30)	1
Netherlands (Single Top 100)	1
Netherlands (Mega Top 50)	3
Poland Airplay (ZPAV)	15
Poland Dance (ZPAV)	1
Spain (Promusicae)	39
Sweden (Sverigetopplistan)	4
Switzerland (Schweizer Hitparade)	17
Ukraine Airplay (TopHit)	48
US Hot Dance/Electronic Songs (Billboard)	13
US Dance Club Songs (Billboard)	4

=== Year-end charts ===
Chart (2013)	Position
Belgium (Ultratop Flanders)	27
Belgium (Ultratop Wallonia)	41
France (SNEP)	56
Hungary (Dance Top 40)	36
Netherlands (Dutch Top 40)	23
Netherlands (Single Top 100)	11
Sweden (Sverigetopplistan)	67
Chart (2014)	Position
Belgium (Ultratop Flanders)	46
Belgium (Ultratop Wallonia)	54
France (SNEP)	143
Germany (Official German Charts)	94
Hungary (Dance Top 40)	1
Netherlands (Dutch Top 40)	62
Netherlands (Single Top 100)	68
Sweden (Sverigetopplistan)	27
US Hot Dance/Electronic Songs (Billboard)	49

== Certifications ==
Region	Certification	Certified units/sales
Belgium (BRMA)	2× Platinum	40,000^{‡}
Canada (Music Canada)	Platinum	80,000^{*}
Italy (FIMI)	Gold	15,000^{‡}
Norway (IFPI Norway)	Platinum	10,000^{‡}
Sweden (GLF)	2× Platinum	80,000^{‡}
Streaming
Denmark (IFPI Danmark)	2× Platinum	5,200,000^{†}
^{*} Sales figures based on certification alone.^{‡} Sales+streaming figures based on certification alone.^{†} Streaming-only figures based on certification alone.

== Tsunami (Jump) ==
"Tsunami (Jump)"

Single by Dvbbs and Borgeous featuring Tinie Tempah

from the album Demonstration (iTunes edition)
- Released: March 9, 2014
- Genre: Big room house; hip house
- Length: 2:39
- Label: Ministry of Sound
- Songwriters: Alex van den Hoef; Chris van den Hoef; John Borger; Niles Hollowell-Dhar; Patrick Okogwu
- Producers: Dvbbs; Borgeous; Kshmr

Dvbbs singles chronology
"Raveology" (2013)	"Tsunami (Jump)" (2014)	"Immortal" (2014)

Borgeous singles chronology
"Invincible" (2014)	"Tsunami (Jump)" (2014)

Tinie Tempah singles chronology
"Lover Not a Fighter" (2014)	"Tsunami (Jump)" (2014)	"5 Minutes" (2014)

The vocal mix, retitled "Tsunami (Jump)", features vocals from English singer and rapper Tinie Tempah. It was released in the United Kingdom through Ministry of Sound on March 9, 2014. It has received extensive airplay in Britain via the likes of Rinse FM, Capital Xtra and BBC Radio 1Xtra. The song topped the UK Singles Chart on 16 March 2014, making it also Dvbbs and Borgeous' first charting single in the UK as well as a UK Dance Chart topper and Tinie Tempah's fourth number one in the UK.

=== Music video ===
An official video to accompany the release of the single's vocal mix was premiered on YouTube on January 23, 2014, at a total duration of two minutes and 40 seconds.

=== Track listing ===
Digital download – single
No.	Title	Length
1.	"Tsunami (Jump)" (featuring Tinie Tempah) (radio edit)	2:39

Digital download – EP
No.	Title	Length
1.	"Tsunami"	3:56
2.	"Tsunami (Jump)" (featuring Tinie Tempah) (Friction remix)	4:09
3.	"Tsunami (Jump)" (featuring Tinie Tempah) (All About She remix)	3:34
4.	"Tsunami (Jump)" (featuring Tinie Tempah) (Tapesh remix)	5:36
5.	"Tsunami (Jump)" (featuring Tinie Tempah) (Bill and Will remix)	5:19
6.	"Tsunami (Jump)" (featuring Tinie Tempah) (Lookas and HLTR$KLTR remix)	3:39

=== Weekly charts ===
Chart (2014)	Peak position
Australia (ARIA)	10
Ireland (IRMA)	7
New Zealand (Recorded Music NZ)	8
Russia Airplay (TopHit)	3
Scottish Singles Sales (Official Charts)	1
UK Singles (Official Charts)	1
UK Dance (Official Charts)	1
UK Indie (Official Charts)	1

=== Year-end charts ===
Chart (2014)	Position
Australia (ARIA)	93
Russia Airplay (TopHit)	28
UK Singles (Official Charts Company)	67

=== Certifications ===
Region	Certification	Certified units/sales
Australia (ARIA)	Platinum	70,000^{^}
New Zealand (RMNZ)	Gold	7,500^{*}
United Kingdom (BPI)	Platinum	600,000^{‡}
^{*} Sales figures based on certification alone.^{^} Shipments figures based on certification alone.^{‡} Sales+streaming figures based on certification alone.
