= Borgeous =

American DJ and music producer

- Borgeous in 2017

Background information
- Born: John James Borger Jr. Miami, Florida, U.S.
- Genres: Big room house; Dutch house; future house; progressive house; electro house; dubstep
- Occupations: DJ; music producer
- Years active: 2012–present
- Labels: Spinnin'; Geousus; Armada
- Website: www.borgeous.com

John James Borger Jr., better known by his stage name Borgeous (stylized as BORGEOUS), is an American DJ and music producer. The LA-based Platinum recording artist and DJ/producer has charted three Billboard Dance Radio Top 10s, three Beatport #1's and a #1 on the iTunes Dancechart in 15 countries.

== Career ==
His "AGGRO" launched his career in 2013. Other releases include "From Cali With Love", "GANGSTEROUS", "Rags to Riches". However "Tsunami", a track he laid down in collaboration with Canadian electronic music duo DVBBS that yielded international fame. The single became a big hit at festivals and was occasionally attributed to DJ Sander van Doorn, but was confirmed by Pete Tong to be the work of DVBBS and Borgeous. In its world exclusive, Tong played the song on his show on BBC Radio 1 on August 16, 2013. Billboard magazine called it “the most played tune at Tomorrowland,” the 2013 Belgian electronic music festival. It was officially released on Doorn Records on August 19, 2013. A week later, it reached #1 on the Beatport 100. It reached #1 on iTunes in 15 different countries, #1 on Beatport, received an EMPO Award for ‘Track of the Year’ and was nominated for the Juno Award ‘Best Dance Recording of the Year’.

On 15 October 2013, he was signed by Spinnin' Records.

In 2014, he reached the top 10 on Billboard's Dance Radio chart not just once, but twice with “Invincible” and “Wildfire”. “Invincible” also became the #2 Song of 2014 on SiriusXM's BPM Radio and Wildfire was #14. He was recruited to remake Afrojack's lead single featuring Wrabel, "Ten Feet Tall" for Universal Music as well as Ariana Grande's "One Last Time". SiriusXM gave him a residency on his weekly podcast “House of Borgeous”. He ranked #87 in DJ Mag's 2013 Top 100 DJs.
