= Eric Turner (singer) =

American singer-songwriter and educator (born 1977)

- Born: November 1, 1977 (age 49); Boston, Massachusetts, U.S.
- Genres: Pop; electronica; alternative pop
- Occupations: Singer; songwriter; educator
- Instruments: Vocals; piano
- Years active: 2007–present
- Labels: Idea of Control; EMI; Capitol
- Member of: Street Fighting Man

Eric Turner (born November 1, 1977) is an American singer, songwriter and educator. He is best known for his guest appearance on Tinie Tempah's 2010 single, "Written in the Stars", which peaked at number 12 on the Billboard Hot 100. He is also the lead singer for the Swedish-American band Street Fighting Man. His 2013 single, "Dancing in My Head" (with Avicii) narrowly entered the UK singles chart.

== Background ==
Turner was born in Boston, and attended Boston College High School. He was a physics teacher at the International English School Stockholm, in Sweden. He attended McGill University in Canada, where he completed a master's degree in biochemistry. Turner is also an accomplished visual artist.

Turner has two brothers and a sister, who live in Boston. His mother is a high school fashion design teacher.

== Music career ==
Turner's performance with his band Street Fighting Man at an event in Stockholm caught the attention of a local sound engineer, who later told his friend, Swedish producer Eshraque "iSHi" Mughal, about the singer: "This guy is freakin amazing! you have to hear this guy." ISHi met him and decided straight away that he had the "X-factor", signing Turner to his music publishing company 2Stripes a few weeks later.

As a talented songwriter as well as singer, Turner began writing pop songs for other artists. "Written in the Stars" was one of the first pop songs he wrote, and became a song for Tinie Tempah with Turner singing the big chorus. The song was released in September 2010 and peaked at number 1 in both Ireland and the United Kingdom, becoming well known for Turner's dramatic inhalations between lines in the chorus. The song peaked at number 12 on the Billboard Hot 100.

Turner also appeared on Break the Chain from Lupe Fiasco's album Lasers. Turner made appearances on the songs "Stereo Sun" and "My Last Try" from Tinchy Stryder's third studio album, Third Strike. The album's lead single, "Angels & Stars", features Lupe Fiasco and Tinie Tempah. It was leaked on January 18, 2012, and was released to pop & rhythm radio station on January 31, 2012. The album's second single, "Stylechanger" (featuring Kardinal Offishall, Wretch 32 and Professor Green), was released via download on February 24, 2012. "Written in the Stars 2.0", a track which was suspected to appear on the album, was leaked online in January 2012.

In early 2013, Turner released a mixtape titled StyleChanger. It included the songs "Written in the Stars 2.0", "StyleChanger" (main track), "Stereo Sun Part 2", "Pretenders", "Old Soul", "Dream On" and "Waves of You". All were written by Turner.

Turner has since collaborated with Avicii on the song "Dancing in My Head", and also co-wrote Tinie Tempah's song, "Someday (Place in the Sun)".

Turner is a well known songwriter. He wrote two songs for the band Lawson: "Learn to Love Again" and "Juliet". He appeared on song on Avicii's album Stories, on the song "Broken Arrows". Turner also wrote and featured on Inna's song "Bop Bop". He wrote and appeared on Sebjak's 2015 single, "Fire Higher".

== Discography ==
=== Singles ===
==== Main artist ====
List of singles, with chart position, showing year released and album name
Title	Year	Peak chart position	Album
Title	Year	UK	Album
"Angels & Stars" (featuring Lupe Fiasco and Tinie Tempah)	2013	–	Eric Turner: The Life
"Stylechanger" (featuring Kardinal Offishall, Wretch 32 and Professor Green)	2013	–	Eric Turner: The Life
"Dancing in My Head" (with Avicii)	2013	188	Eric Turner: The Life

==== Featured artist ====
List of singles, with selected chart positions and certifications, showing year released and album name
Title	Year	Peak chart positions										Certifications	Album
Title	Year	US	AUS	DEN	FIN	FRA	IRE	NZ	NOR	SWI	UK	Certifications	Album
"Written in the Stars" (Tinie Tempah featuring Eric Turner)	2010	12	34	18	7	21	1	13	2	47	1	RIAA: Platinum; ARIA: Platinum; BPI: 2× Platinum; IFPI NOR: 10× Platinum; RMNZ: Platinum	Disc-Overy
"Bop Bop" (Inna featuring Eric Turner)	2015	–	–	–	–	–	–	–	–	–	–		Inna

=== Guest appearances ===
List of non-single tracks Eric Turner has appeared on
Year	Contribution	Album
2010	"Stereo Sun" (Tinchy Stryder featuring Eric Turner)	Third Strike
2010	"My Last Try" (Tinchy Stryder featuring Eric Turner)	Third Strike
2011	"Break the Chain" (Lupe Fiasco featuring Eric Turner and Sway)	Lasers
2015	"Bop Bop" (Inna featuring Eric Turner)	Inna
2015	"Fire Higher" (Matt Nash & Sebjak featuring Eric Turner)	
