= Dvbbs =

Canadian music production duo

DVBBS
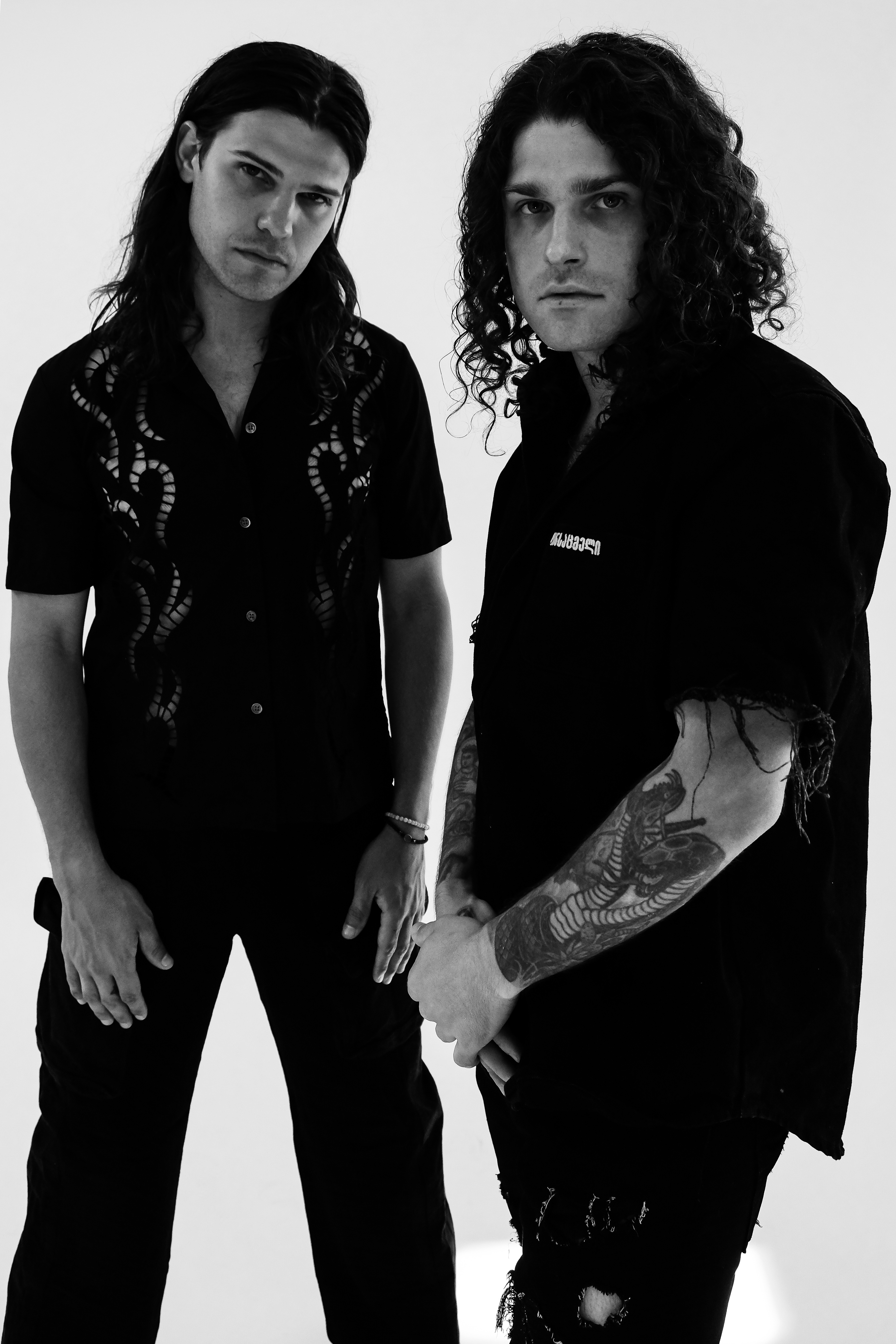
- DVBBS in 2021; Alexandre (left), Christopher (right)

Background information
- Origin: Orangeville, Ontario, Canada; Los Angeles, California, U.S.
- Genres: EDM; house; dance-pop
- Years active: 2012–present
- Labels: Universal; Kanary; Doorn; Spinnin'; Ultra
- Members: Alexandre van den Hoef; Christopher van den Hoef

Dvbbs (stylized in all caps as DVBBS; pronounced "dubs") is a Canadian production duo formed in 2012, composed of brothers Christopher van den Hoef and Alexandre van den Hoef.

== History ==
=== Career ===
Christopher and Alexandre Van den Hoef are natives of Orangeville, Ontario. Their father is Dutch and migrated to Canada, and their mother is Greek Canadian. The two DJs lived in Athens, Greece for two years. They are currently based in Los Angeles, California, as well as Toronto, Ontario, and are signed with Josh Herman at STRVCTVRE Artist Management.

DVBBS spent two months recording their debut extended play, Initio, released in March 2012. The EP features influences from a variety of genres, including house, electronic, dubstep and reggae.

Following their 2012 debut EP, Initio, DVBBS gained international acclaim via their chart-topping single, "Tsunami", in 2013. As the duo's first-ever certified hit, the platinum-selling "Tsunami" today counts over 1 billion streams. The 2014 vocal mix of the track, "Tsunami (Jump)" featuring English rapper Tinie Tempah, topped both the UK Singles and UK Dance charts, making DVBBS one of only 13 Canadian artists to reach number 1 on the Official UK Singles Chart. DVBBS also count 12 platinum singles via "Tinted Eyes", "West Coast", "IDWK", "Tsunami" and "Not Going Home," the latter of which also received a Juno Awards nomination for Dance Recording of the Year in 2018.

Their hit single came with "Tsunami" It had been promoted by Dutch DJ Sander van Doorn, although he denied being the producer. The song was confirmed by Pete Tong to be the work of DVBBS and Borgeous when Tong played the song on his BBC Radio 1 show on August 16, 2013. It was officially released on Sander Van Doorn's label Doorn Records on August 19, 2013. It also reached #1 on the Beatport 100. A vocal remix featuring British rapper Tinie Tempah entitled "Tsunami (Jump)" was released in Tempah's native United Kingdom in March 2014, on Ministry of Sound Recordings. DVBBS released their debut album, Sleep on October 22, 2021.

On May 29, 2026, the duo released the single "Torture of the Heart", in collaboration with fellow-Canadian singer Nelly Furtado.

=== Live performances ===
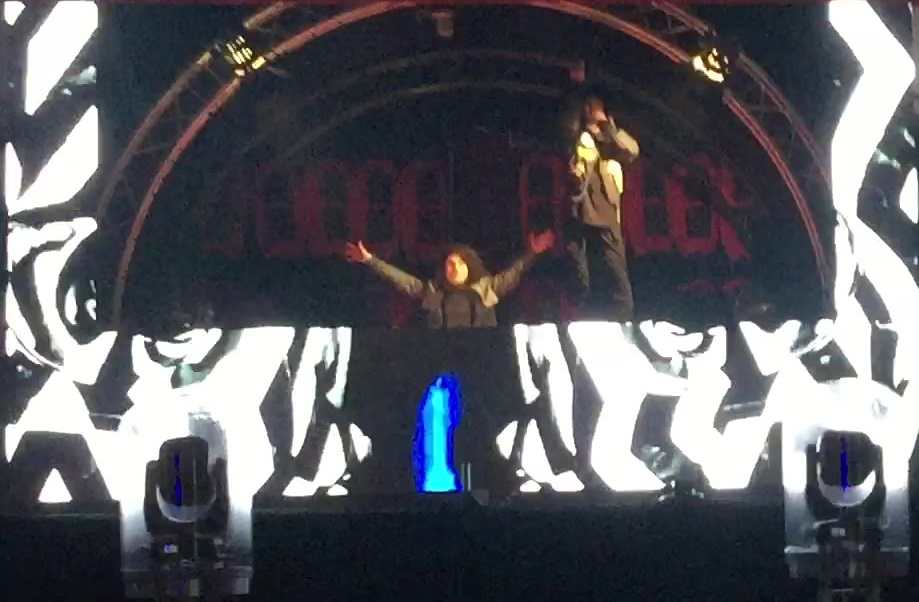
DVBBS live at Airbeat One Festival 2016 in Germany

As one of the top live acts in dance music—clocking in more than 750 shows in the past five years—they have performed across the world’s top festivals. DVBBS have performed with Tiësto, NERVO, Steve Aoki, Martin Garrix, Showtek, Sander Van Doorn, DJ Snake and others. They have performed at most major music festivals. The duo have played mainstage at Tomorrowland, Ultra Music Festival, and Creamfields, among many others.

== Awards ==
- 2013: "One to Watch" award at the Canadian Urban Music Awards
- 2014: "Dance recording of the year" Nominee - Juno Awards
- 2014: "Track of the year" - EMPO Awards
- 2018: "Dance recording of the year" Nominee - Juno Awards
- 2019: "Single of the year" Canadian Music Week - Indie Awards
- 2021 "Electronic/ Dance Artist/ Group or Duo of the Year" Canadian Music Week - Indie Awards
- 2024: 3 Nominations in 2024 "TIKTOK JUNO FAN CHOICE", "DANCE RECORDING OF THE YEAR", "DANCE RECORDING OF THE YEAR"
- 2026: WINNER "Dance / Pop Song Of The Year" EDMA Awards

== Discography ==
- Sleep (2021)

== Polls ==
=== DJ Magazine Top 100 DJ ===
Year	Position	Notes	Ref.
2014	20		
2015	16	Up 4	
2016	24	Down 8	
2017	22	Up 2	
2018	16	Up 6	
2019	23	Down 7	
2020	55	Down 32	
2021	n/a	Out	
