= Scheja =

Scheja is a surname. Notable people with the surname include:

- Leonard Scheja, Swedish musician from the duo Nause
- Rebecca Scheja (born 1989), Swedish actress, singer, songwriter, and disc jockey
- Staffan Scheja (born 1950), Swedish pianist and professor
