= A Summer Tale =

Den bästa sommaren
- Directed by: Ulf Malmros
- Written by: Ulf Malmros; Lars Johansson
- Produced by: Lars Jönsson
- Cinematography: Mats Olofsson
- Edited by: Fredrik Abrahamsen, Michal Leszczylowski
- Music by: Dan Sundquist; Henrik Medquist
- Production company: Zentropa
- Distributed by: Film i Väst; Sonet Film; Sandrew Metronome
- Release date: 8 March 2000
- Running time: 91 minutes
- Countries: Sweden; Denmark
- Language: Swedish

A Summer Tale is a 2000 comedy-drama. Its original Swedish title is Den bästa sommaren, which means "The Best Summer". Written and directed by Ulf Malmros, the film stars Kjell Bergqvist, Rebecca Scheja, Cecilia Nilsson, and Brasse Brännström, and was produced by Zentropa and Memfis Film.

== Plot ==
The film takes place in 1958 in Molkom, where two children, Mårten from Stockholm and Annika from Uppsala, will be "summer children" to Yngve Johansson, who every summer takes children to his home, but it has been bad earlier years. In the beginning Mårten and Annika don't like Yngve, but they love each other more and more and they also start liking Yngve. Maybe he isn't as bad as they think? This summer'll move everything in their life for all future.

== Cast ==
- Kjell Bergqvist as Yngve Johansson
- Anastasios Soulis as Mårten
- Rebecca Scheja as Annika
- Cecilia Nilsson as Miss Svanström
- Brasse Brännström as Sven
- Marcus Hasselborg as Harald, Sven's son
- Gachugo Makini as Jacques
- Göran Thorell as Erik Olsson, man working for Barnavårdsnämnden
- Ann Petrén as Mrs Ljungström
- Eivin Dahlgren as Headwaiter
- Anna Kristina Kallin as Doctor
- Ralph Carlsson as Priest
- Jerker Fahlström as Postman
- Johan Holmberg as Policeman

== Production ==
The film was shot at Björkås Herrgård in Vargön, Restad Gård in Vänersborg, Anten-Gräfsnäs Railway, in Upphärad and in Sjuntorp. It premiered (in Sweden) on 8 March 2000 and is recommended from 7 years.
