= Kallin =

Kallin is a surname. Notable people with this surname include:

- Anna Kristina Kallin (1953–2004), Swedish singer and actor
- Catherine Kallin, Canadian physicist
- Cecilia Kallin (born 1991), Swedish pop musician
- Eva Kallin, American mathematician
- Patrik Kallin (born 1979), Swedish wheelchair curler
