= Levin (guitar company) =

Swedish guitar company

Levin Guitars
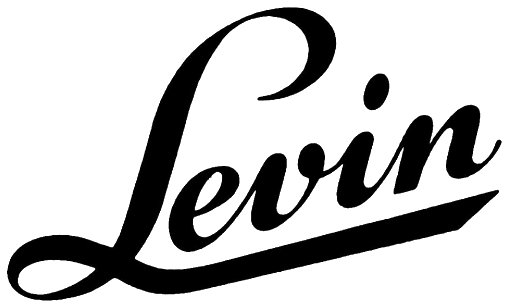
- Industry: Musical instruments
- Founded: 1900
- Founder: Herman Carlson Levin
- Defunct: 1978; 48 years ago
- Headquarters: Gothenburg
- Area served: Global
- Key people: Herman Carlson Levin
- Products: Acoustic guitars, mandolins, lutes, banjos, drums

Levin was a Swedish manufacturer of musical instruments founded by Herman Carlson Levin. Active from 1900 to 1978, the company produced over half a million instruments, mostly guitars, but also mandolins, banjos and lutes, making Levin the largest instrument manufacturer in Scandinavia for many years. Levin is best known for originating Goya acoustic guitars.

== History ==
=== Founding ===
Herman Carlson Levin was born and raised in Åsaka, Sweden. At age 18, he attended carpentry school and later served an apprenticeship at a furniture maker in Gothenburg. In August 1887, Levin moved to America, working briefly as a carpenter before getting a job in 1888 at a guitar factory.

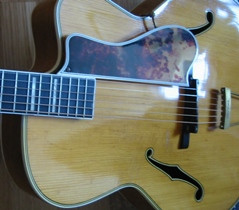
Levin Royal archtop (1949)

Three years later, Levin and two partners started small-scale production of instruments in New York City. While on a visit to Sweden 1895, Levin recognized that demand for instruments was high and that manufacturing of instruments in Sweden could be profitable. So with 4,000 kronor to invest, Levin opened Herman Carlssons Instrumentfabrik at Norra Larmgatan in Gothenburg.

With a workshop of seventy square meters and a staff of two, Levin started manufacturing guitars and mandolins. By the end of 1901, 473 instruments had been made, and in 1903, with a staff of five, Levin's 1000th instrument was made. The Levin factory was one of the best in Europe, and between 1904 and 1912 Levin received many awards, including the gold medal in Madrid for best guitar, as well as the exhibition's Grand Prix. By the mid-1920s the plant had made over 50,000 instruments, and in 1925, production of a line of banjos was launched. By 1936, the 100,000th instrument had left the plant and Levin was marketing a successful line of archtop guitars. Shortly before 1940, Levin employed a staff of forty-five in a facility of a 1000 square meters. In the 1950s, Levin launched a line of inexpensive guitars intended for schools and novice guitar players; these guitars were of lower quality than the rest of the Levin line-up.

=== Launching Goya guitars ===
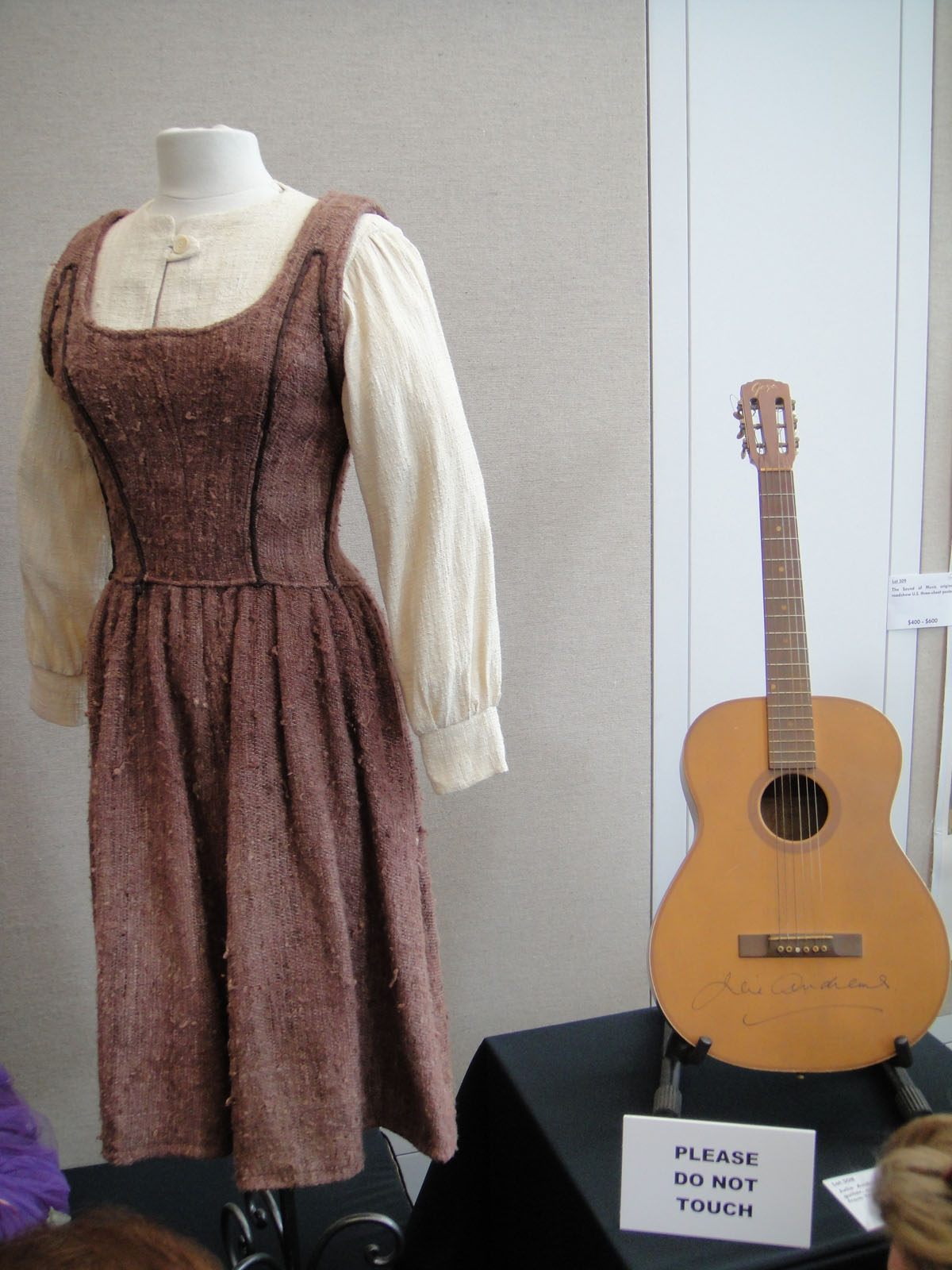
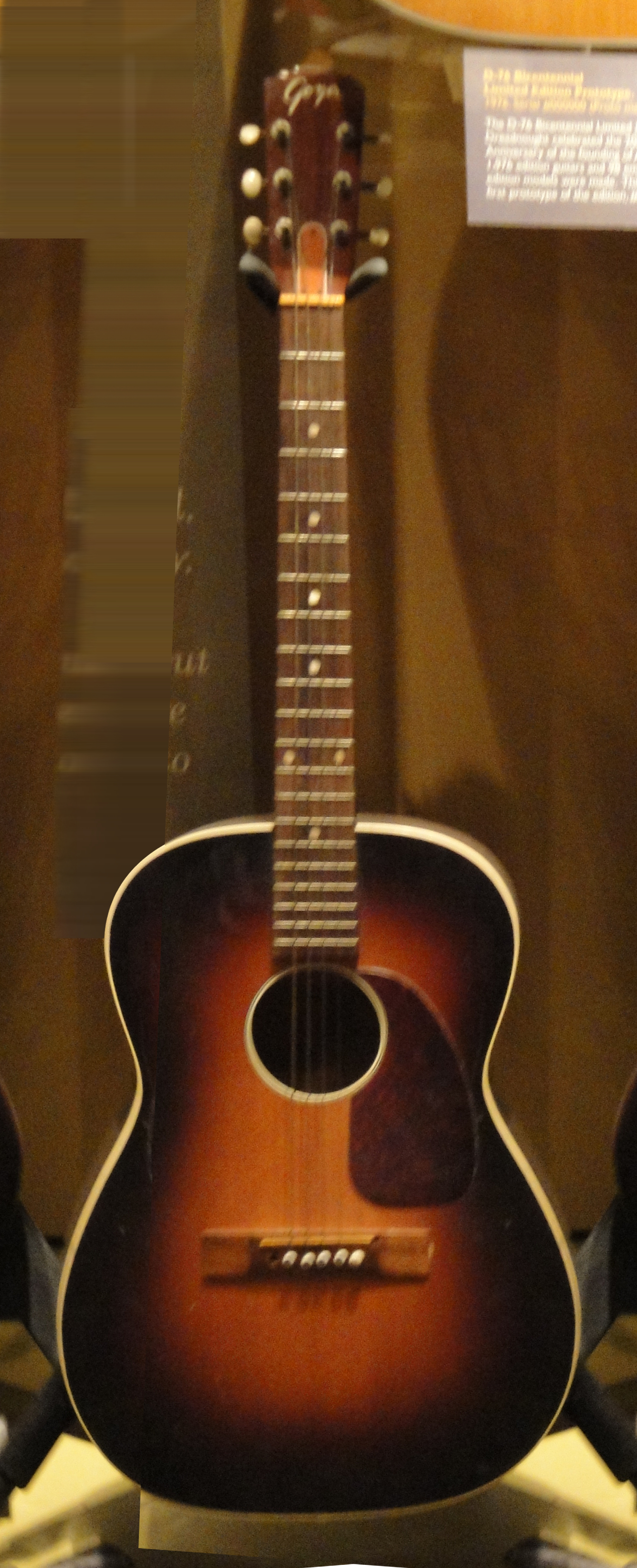
(Left): Goya guitar used by Julie Andrews as "Maria" in The Sound of Music;
(right): Goya guitar exhibited at the C.F. Martin Guitar Museum

In 1952, Jerome Hershman, a guitar distributor from America, noticed a Levin guitar at a trade show in Germany and convinced the Levin company to let him market their guitars in America. Hershman believed that the brand name Levin would be hard to market in America, so he suggested the name Goya, inspired by the Spanish artist Francisco Goya, who was well known for depicting guitars in his paintings. The Goya product line proved to be successful due to its high quality finish. The use of nylon strings also gave the guitar a different tone than guitars that used steel strings, making it popular among folk musicians. In the late 1950s, a line of steel-stringed flat-tops were launched, furnished with adjustable truss rods and bolted necks.

In the early 1960s, a line of "folk guitars" were launched with wide flat fretboards similar to those on nylon string guitars but fitted with steel strings. These instruments were developed partly in collaboration with American folk-singer Oscar Brand. Two 12-stringed flat-top models were launched during the same period. In 1967, a contract was signed between the Levin company and Goya Music (formerly Hershman Music) for no fewer than 120,000 instruments over a period of ten years. At this time, the Goya export constituted approximately 70% of the company's production, which was over 30,000 instruments, mostly guitars.

The contract was broken by Goya Music in 1968 following the acquisition of Goya Music by Avnet Inc, which owned Guild Guitars. The Goya distribution rights were sold in 1970 to amplifier manufacturer Kustom Electric of Chanute, Kansas. In 1972, Kustom went bankrupt and distribution was taken over by another Chanute company, Dude Inc. It is unclear if Levin ever delivered any instruments to Dude; the sales made by Dude may have been the remaining stock from the Kustom bankruptcy, which were relabelled.

In 1976, Dude sold the Goya brand to CF Martin, which had purchased the majority of the Levin Company a few years earlier. CF Martin started importing Japanese and Korean instruments under the Goya name, and the reputation of the Goya and Levin brands diminished. CF Martin stopped offering Goya instruments during the 1990s.

In 1973, when Martin bought Levin, the facility became the European headquarters for Martin Guitars and their Japan import brand Sigma Guitars, as well as actually producing a run of some two-hundred Martin D-18 acoustic guitars, which were labelled "LD-18 - Made In Gothenburg, Sweden". Some LD 28 Martins stamped "Made In Gothenburg" have surfaced. In 1981, the last guitar was built in the Gothenburg facility and parts of the inventory and the brand were bought by Svensk Musik AB, which started producing Levin classical guitars in a factory owned by former guitar neck supplier Hans Persson. Hans's son Lennart is still producing guitars for "Svenska Levin AB" in his father's workshop outside Mariestad, Sweden. Svenska Levin offers steel string flat tops and a line of archtop jazz guitars based on old Levin models, but they are made in Korea.

In 2014, Anakronfilm released the documentary "Levin - ett namn med musik" ("Levin - a name with music"). The film tells the story of the Levin company.

In 2022, Wouter Blees released a book about the history of Levin and Goya guitars: "The Goya Levin Book".
