= Rebecca & Fiona =

Swedish DJ duo

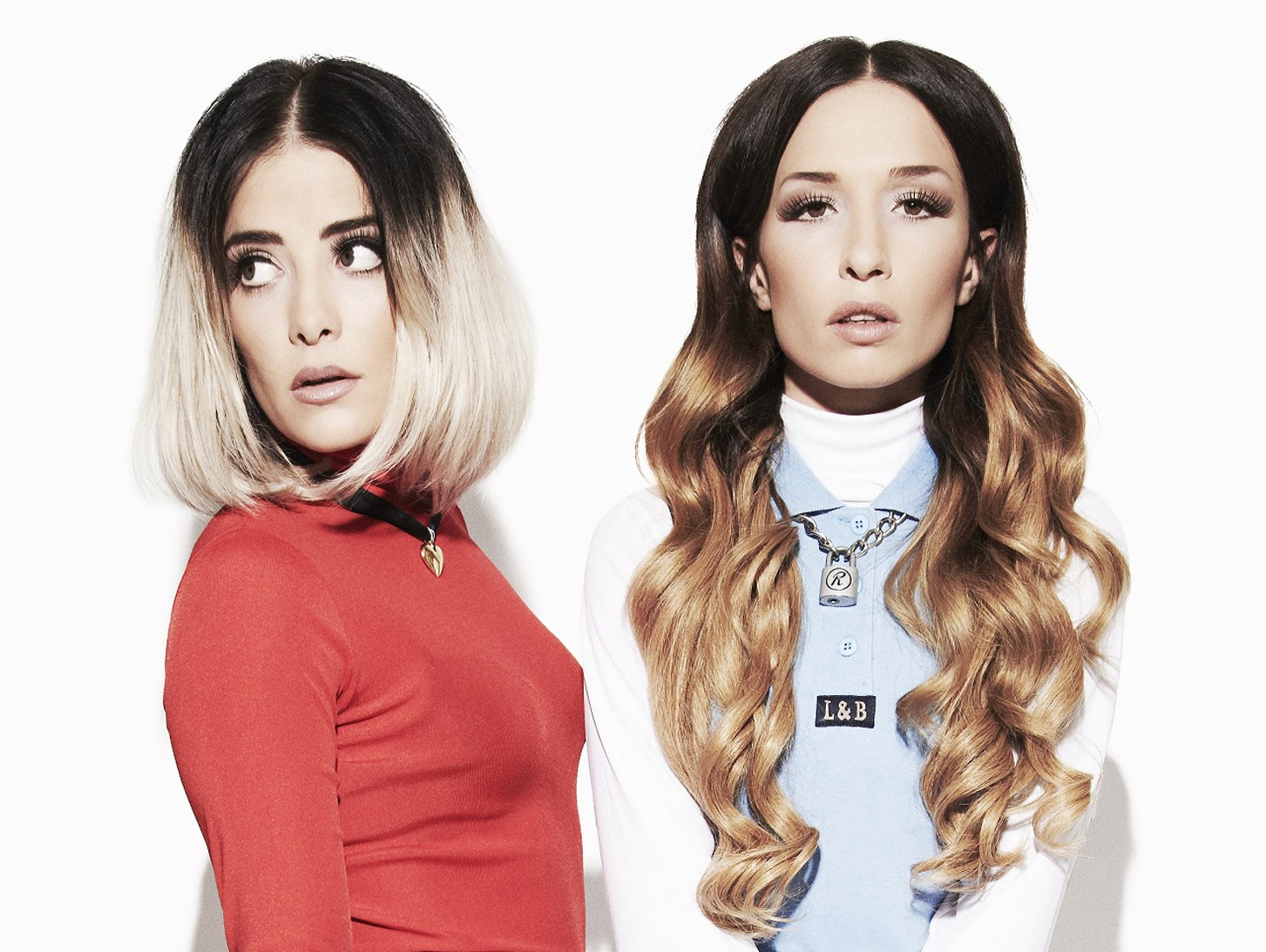
- Fiona FitzPatrick and Rebecca Scheja, 2011

Background information
- Origin: Stockholm, Sweden
- Genres: Pop, indie pop, dance, electro house, eurodance
- Years active: 2010–present
- Label: Stereo Stereo
- Members: Rebecca Scheja; Fiona FitzPatrick
- Website: www.rebeccafiona.com

Rebecca & Fiona is a Swedish DJ duo from Stockholm. The duo was founded by Rebecca Scheja (born 26 January 1989) and Fiona FitzPatrick (born 28 November 1988) in 2007, when they met at a party and started to work and make music together as DJs. In 2010 they released their debut single "Luminary Ones" and during 2010-2011 they were support act for Robyn, other notable performances during those years were also at the Polar Music Prize and the Swedish music festival Way Out West.

Since their breakthrough, Rebecca & Fiona have released two Grammy-winning albums and toured globally as a featured act and with leading artists like Robyn, Avicii, Tiësto, Kaskade and Axwell. Following their success in the US, they have also had a residency in Las Vegas and played at major festivals such as Beyond Wonderland Tomorrowland and Electric Daisy Carnival. Musically they have collaborated with a wide range of producers and writers including Little Jinder, Dolores Haze, Adrian Lux, Kaskade, Duvchi, Kurt Uenala, The Loops of Fury, Panda Da Panda, Tommie Sunshine and Spank Rock.

== Musical career ==
=== Background ===
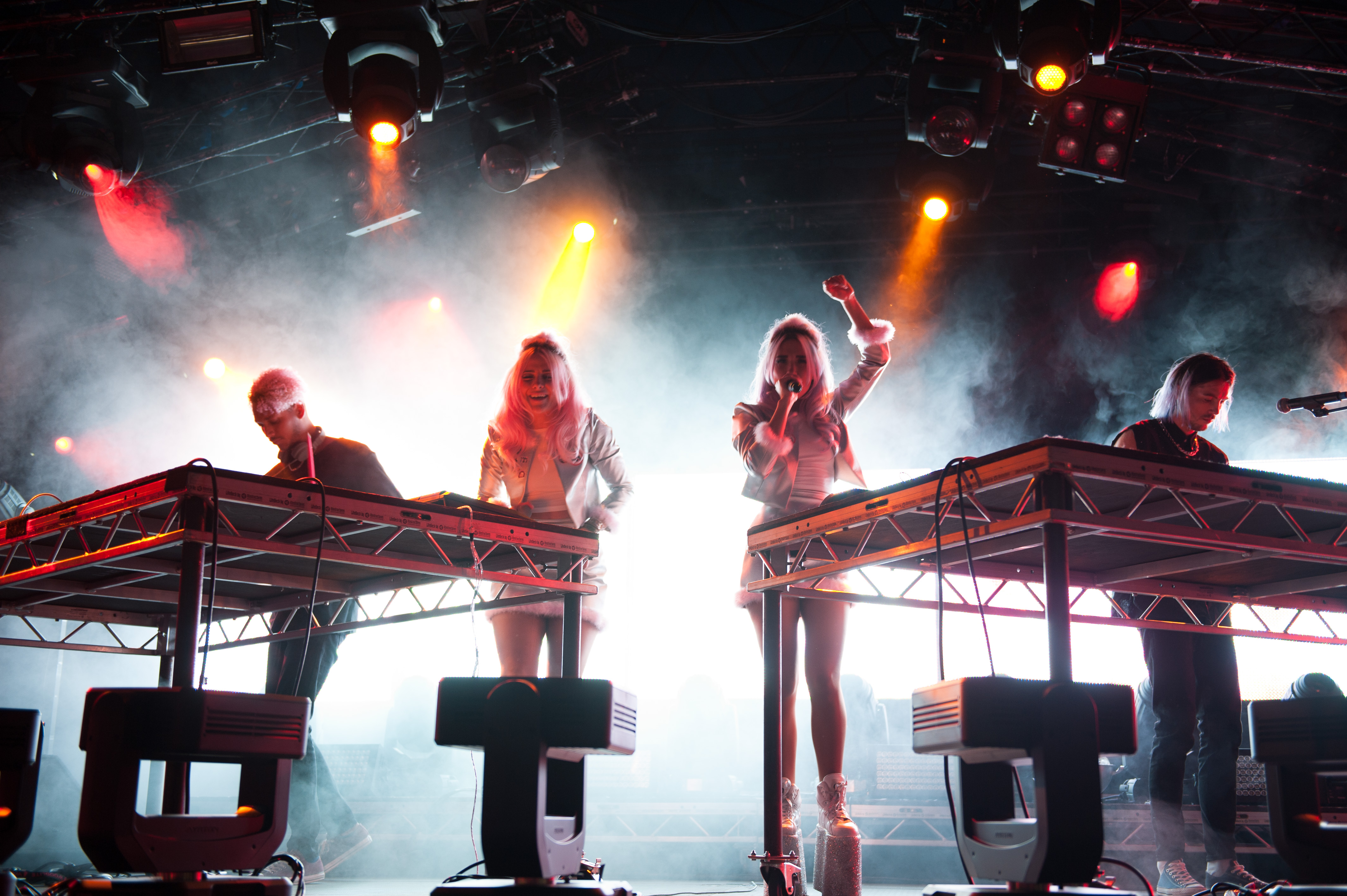
Rebecca & Fiona at Way Out West in August 2014

Stockholm born Rebecca Scheja and Fiona FitzPatrick, daughters of musicians Staffan Scheja and Greg Fitzpatrick respectively, met at a friend's house party and started to make music together in 2007. After a couple of years touring around Sweden as DJs, they made their public breakthrough in 2010 with the release of their first single "Luminary Ones". In the same year, the Swedish Public Service (SVT) presented the docu-drama Rebecca & Fiona. The awarded show was the network's first to be produced exclusively for the web and proved to be a massive hit.

In 2011 their debut album I Love You, Man! was released, followed by the single "Bullets" and their second album Beauty Is Pain in 2014. Both albums won a Grammis for "Best Electro/Dance Albums".

=== Contemporary career ===
In the past few years, Rebecca & Fiona have pursued more of a pop sound with singles like "Holler, Sayonara" and "Shotgun". After breaking free from a major record company, spring 2018 marks the release of their third album Art of Being a Girl.

"We're really aware of what we do. It’s important for women and young people. We stand up for what we think and believe, and we want to inspire people to do cool stuff and to not let anything hold them back. Look into yourself and discover what you want to do. That’s the way we live and make our music."

They released their first independent single, "Need You" in April 2018, followed by single "Fool's Gold" on May 18, 2018.

They performed with a T-shirt with the communist symbol hammer and sickle at Stockholm Pride 2018.

== Discography ==
=== Studio albums ===
Year	Album	Peak positions	Awards
Year	Album	SWE	Awards
2011	I Love You Man	36	Swedish Grammis for "Best Electronic/Dance Album"
2014	Beauty Is Pain	31	Swedish Grammis for "Best Electronic/Dance Album"
2018	Art of Being a Girl	—	
2024	MEGA DANCE	—	

=== Extended plays ===
Year	Title	Format
2016	Party Hard	Digital
2021	Fet House Mode	Limited edition 12" vinyl
2023	Greatest Tits	Digital

=== Singles ===
Charting

Year	Single	Peak positions
Year	Single	SWE
2011	"Bullets"	29
2013	"Taken Over"	33
2015	"Sayonara"	68

Others

- 2010: "Luminary Ones"
- 2011: "If She Was Away / Hard"
- 2011: "Jane Doe"
- 2011: "Turn It Down" (with Kaskade)
- 2012: "Dance"
- 2012: "Giliap"
- 2013: "Union"
- 2013: "Hot Shots"
- 2014: "Candy Love"
- 2014: "Holler"
- 2016: "Drugstore Lovin'"
- 2016: "Shotgun"
- 2016: "Cold As X-mas"
- 2017: "Pop Bitches"
- 2017: "Pay Me Money"
- 2018: "Need You"
- 2018: "Fool's Gold"
- 2018: "Different" (featuring Marcy Chin)
- 2018: "Stupid"
- 2019: "One More Night"
- 2019: "Down For It" (with Moti)
- 2019: "Can't Erase" (with Nause)
- 2020: "Heart Skips a Beat"
- 2020: "Fet House Mode"
- 2020: "I Need Love" (with Kleerup)
- 2020: "People Getting Mad"
- 2020: “Sad Boy, Happy Girl / Lyfe Lyne" (with Moguai)
- 2020: “Champagne Promises” (with ANIMAL)
- 2020: "Another World"
- 2021: “Bad Trip” (with LVNDSCAPE feat. ØZMA)
- 2021: “Rivers”
- 2021: “Replay” (with John Dahlbäck)
- 2021: “Real Love”
- 2021: “Sing It Back”
- 2021: “Sweetest Delight”
- 2021: “All the Things She Said” (cover of the 2002 international debut single by Russian pop-duo t.A.T.u.)

=== Featured singles ===
- 2010: "Låna Pengar" (Basutbudet featuring Rebecca & Fiona)
- 2011: "Boy" (Adrian Lux featuring Rebecca & Fiona)
- 2011: "Turn It Down" (Kaskade featuring Rebecca & Fiona)
- 2019: "Apollo" (Wayfloe featuring Rebecca & Fiona)
