= Rebecca Scheja =

Swedish actress, singer, songwriter, and disc jockey (born 1989)

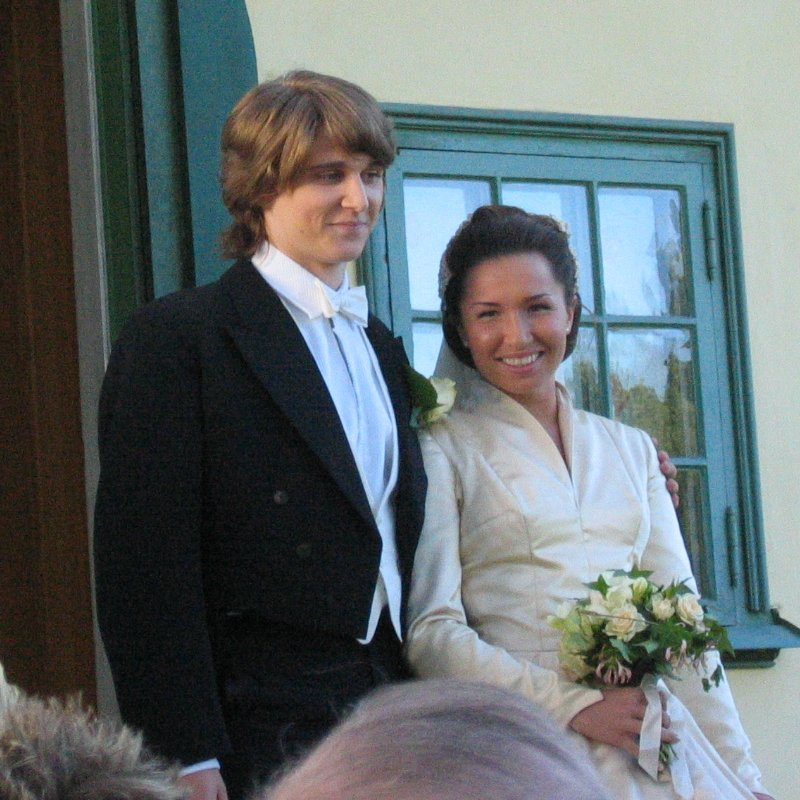
- Anastasios Soulis and Rebecca Scheja appearing in the film Bröllopsfotografen
- Born: 26 January 1989 (age 37)
- Occupations: actress; DJ; singer-songwriter
- Children: 1
- Father: Staffan Scheja
- Awards: Grammis (2011, 2015)
- Website: http://www.rebeccafiona.com/

Ania Rebecca Scheja (born 26 January 1989) is a Swedish actress, disc jockey (DJ), singer, songwriter and record producer.

== Early life ==
She is the daughter of Staffan and Marianne Scheja and sister of Leonard Scheja. As a student she attended the Adolf Fredrik's Music School in Stockholm.

== Career ==
Scheja is in the DJ duet Rebecca & Fiona with Fiona Fitzpatrick since she met her at a party in 2007, and they have owned the club DET at Spy Bar in Stockholm since 2008. Together with Adrian Lux, they produced the song "Boy".

Scheja and Fitzpatrick won a Grammis in 2011 and 2015.

== Personal life ==
Together with Klas Beyer, Scheja has one child born 2025.

== Selected filmography ==
- 1997 – Adam & Eva
- 1998 – Längtans blåa blomma (TV)
- 1999 – En häxa i familjen
- 2000 – Den bästa sommaren
- 2005 – Sandor slash Ida
- 2009 – Bröllopsfotografen

== Discography ==
=== Albums ===
- 2011 – I Love You, Man!
- 2014 – "Beauty Is Pain"

=== Singles ===
- 2010 – Luminary Ones (with Fiona Fitzpatrick)
- 2011 – Bullets
- 2011 – If She Was Away/Hard
- 2011 – Jane Doe
- 2012 – Dance
- 2013: "Taken Over" (with Style Of Eye)
- 2013: "Union"
- 2013: "Hot Shots" (with Vice)
- 2014: "Candy Love"
- 2014: "Holler"
