= Johan Östling =

Swedish actor and musician

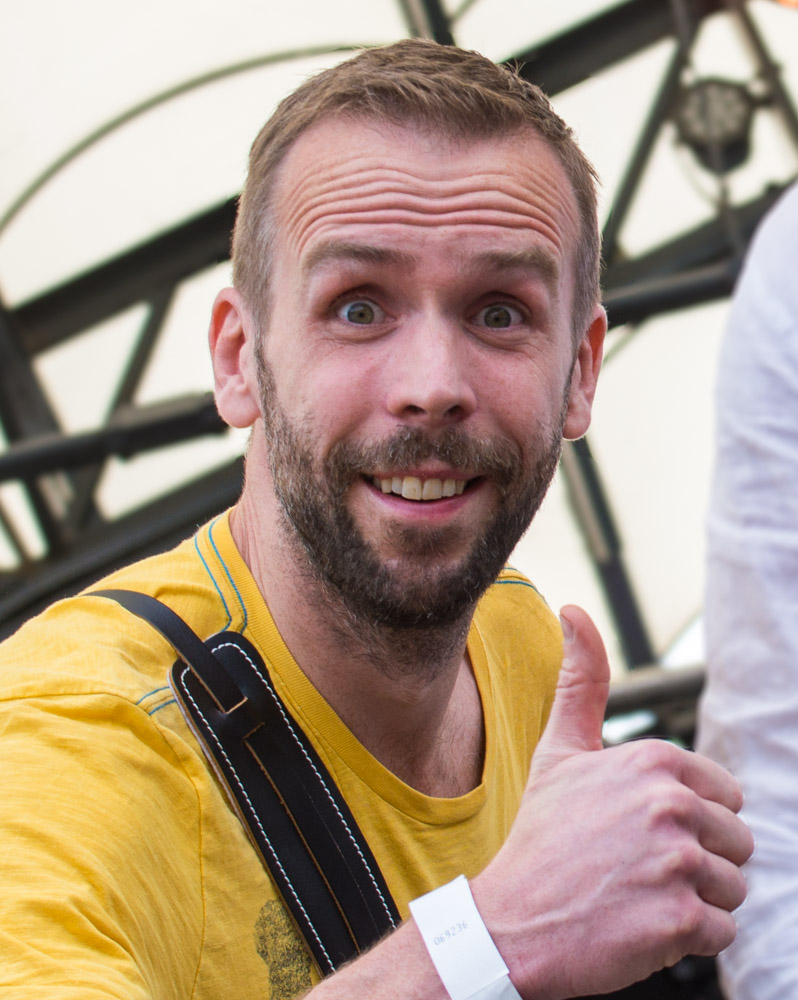
- Östling in 2015
- Born: 27 September 1973 (age 52); Karlstad, Sweden
- Occupation: Actor

Johan Östling is a Swedish actor and musician. He was a member of the music group The Starboys. However, he left in 2013. He has acted in films such as Slim Susie and Bröllopsfotografen, and in TV-shows such as Ack Värmland which is broadcast on TV4.
