= Ostling =

Ostling may refer to:

- Anders Östling, Swedish bandy player
- Johan Östling, Swedish actor and musician
- Leif Östling, Swedish businessman
- Maria Östling, Swedish swimmer
- Ralph Ostling (1927–2009), American politician from Michigan
- Richard and Joan Ostling, American authors and journalists
- Stig Östling, Swedish ice hockey player
