= Bröllopsfotografen =

- Swedish DVD cover
- Directed by: Ulf Malmros
- Written by: Ulf Malmros
- Produced by: Jan Blomgren
- Starring: Björn Starrin; Tuva Novotny; Kjell Bergqvist
- Cinematography: Mats Olofsson
- Distributed by: Home Vision Entertainment (HVE); Sandrew Metronome Distribution Sverige AB
- Release date: 16 October 2009
- Running time: 97 minutes
- Country: Sweden
- Language: Swedish

Bröllopsfotografen (English: The Wedding Photographer) is a 2009 Swedish tragicomedy film written and directed by Ulf Malmros. It stars Björn Starrin, Tuva Novotny and Kjell Bergqvist.

== Plot ==
The film is mostly set in Stockholm and in the small industrial town of Molkom in the Swedish province of Värmland, where Robin, an amateur photographer lives. When the factory in Molkom shuts down, Robin leaves his beloved hometown to try his luck in Stockholm as a wedding photographer. His first wedding is an upper-class wedding, where he falls in love with the bride's sister. He tries to fit in the upper-class, and changes not merely his outlook on life but also his hairstyle.

== Cast ==
- Björn A. Ling as Robin
- Kjell Bergqvist as the unsuccessful actor and Robin's landlord Jonny Björk
- Tuva Novotny as Robin's love Astrid
- Johannes Brost as Astrid's father Claes
- Lotta Tejle as Gunilla
- Tomas Tjerneld as Ove
- Johanna Strömberg as Malin
- Johan Andersson as Bobby
- Marianne Scheja as Cecilia
- Rebecca Scheja as Elsa
- Rebecca Scheja as the bride
- Anastasios Soulis as the bridegroom
- Michael Nyqvist as a stage actor
- Jessica Liedberg as a stage actress
- Pontus Olgrim as a baptising assistant
- Erik Lundin as a car dealer
- Pontus Olgrim as a dopvärd

== See also ==
- Slim Susie
