= Mia Skäringer =

Swedish actress and comedian (born 1976)

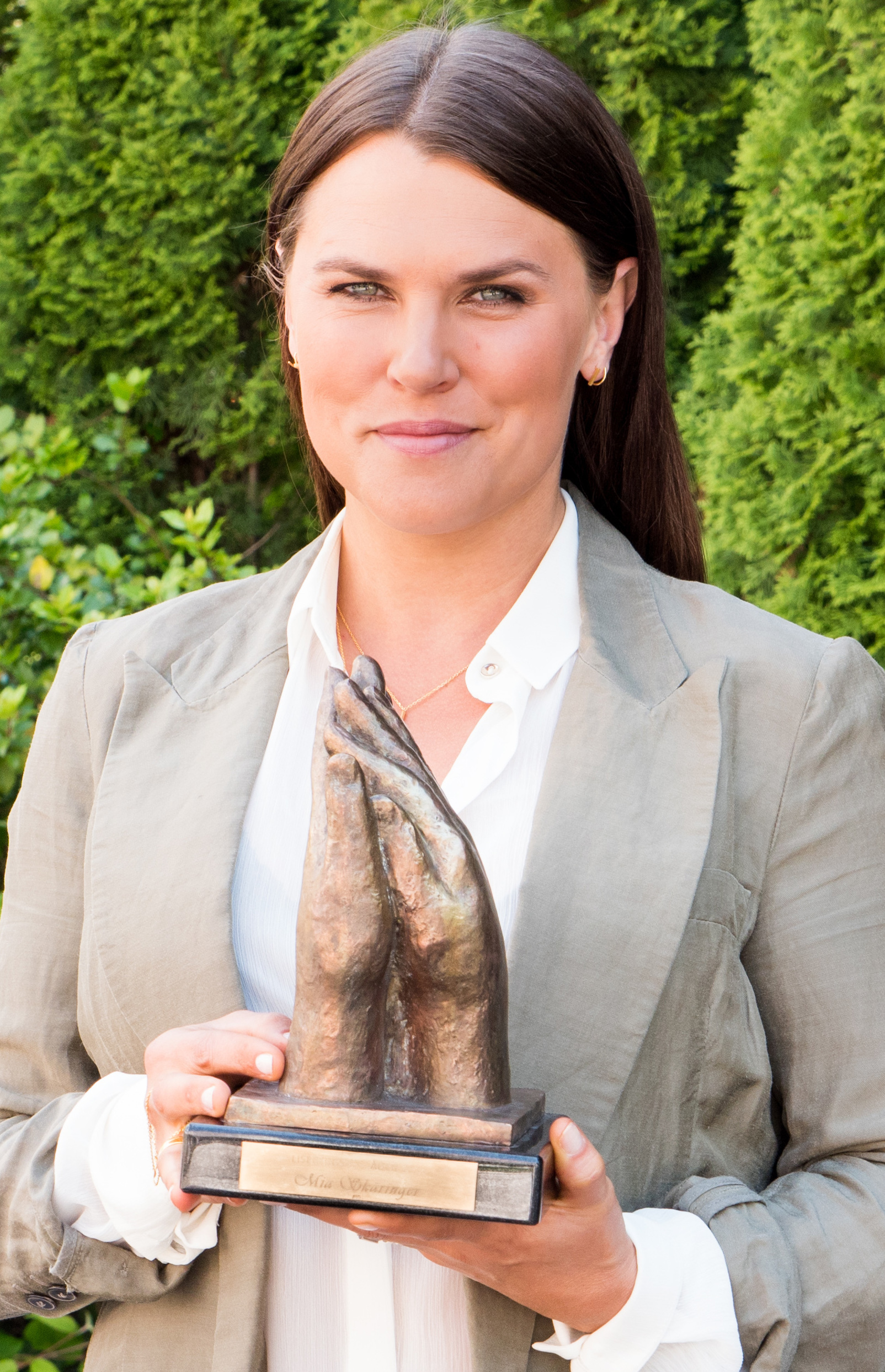
- Mia Skäringer receiving Lisebergsapplåden 2015
- Born: October 4, 1976 (age 49); Kristinehamn, Värmland
- Occupations: Actress, comedian
- Known for: Mia och Klara, Solsidan

Maria Elisabeth "Mia" Skäringer (born October 4, 1976) is a Swedish actress and comedian who has twice won the Kristallen Award. Her first television job was at the Sanning och konsekvens show on ZTV, where she met Klara Zimmergren. Skäringer and Zimmergren after that hosted the radio show Roll on together. The duo has also had their own sketch comedy show on SVT in Sweden called Mia och Klara. The show was awarded a Kristallen award for best comedy show on television in both 2008 and 2009. She has starred as Anna Svensson in Solsidan since 2010.

== Early life ==
Skäringer wanted to be an actress from the age of four and became active at her local theater in Kristinehamn. Skäringer describes herself as a "small girl, quite heavy and a tom-boy" when she was younger. She related in interviews that she suffered from an eating disorder from the eighth grade until her last year in college.

== Solsidan success ==
During early 2009, Skäringer starred in the hit television show Solsidan along with Felix Herngren, Johan Rheborg and Josephine Bornebusch. Skäringer stated that she and Herngren had never met before "but found each other from the start and co-operated like a team which doesn't happen very often in comedy". The first episode of Solsidan was watched by 1.8 million viewers and was broadcast by TV4 making it the most-watched programme of the day in Sweden. And in March 2010 a second season was announced, which premiered in January 2011. Many other known names in comedy asked to be in it after the success of the first season.

== Other ventures ==
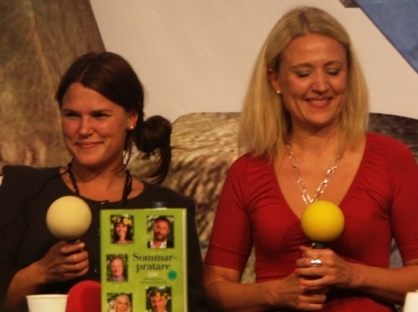
Skäringer and Klara Zimmergren in 2008

In 1997, Skäringer appeared on the radio program Bossanova on Swedish radio P3 along with Klara Zimmergren. They also joined the radio programme Frank and Sommarsalva and their own radio programme Roll on. The final episode was broadcast in January 2007.

After that, the duo started working on their first comedy show on television, later named Mia & Klara. It was viewed by 610,000 viewers in its premiere episode. The programme continued, as season 2 of Mia & Klara was viewed by more than a million viewers on average for each episode.

In 2023, Skäringer along with Hampus Nessvold did the stage show ”Just idag mår vi bra”.

== Personal life ==
Skäringer has two children, one born in 2000 and another born in 2003.

In 2007, her father died in a car accident. According to Skäringer her father was a heavy drinker but was not drunk at the time of his accident.

In August 2009, Skäringer released her first book, Dyngkåt och hur helig som helst ("Filthy horny and as holy as possible"), where she wrote about her experiences from her divorce and parenting. The book is also based on chronicles and blogs that Skäringer has written for the magazine Mama.

== Filmography/television ==
- Sanning och konsekvens (1995)
- Släng dig i brunnen (1997)
- Mia och Klara (2007–2009)
- Solsidan (2010–present)
- The Hundred-Year-Old Man Who Climbed Out the Window and Disappeared (2013)
- Ängelby (2015)
- Ack Värmland (2015–present)

== Awards ==
Year	Award	Category	For	Results
2008	Gaygalan	Best duo (together with Klara Zimmergren)	Mia och Klara	Won
2008	Kristallen	Best humour programme (together with Klara Zimmergren)	Mia och Klara	Won
2009	Kristallen	Best humour programme (together with Klara Zimmergren)	Mia och Klara	Won
