= Trollhättan Municipality =

Trollhättan Municipality Trollhättans kommun
- Municipality
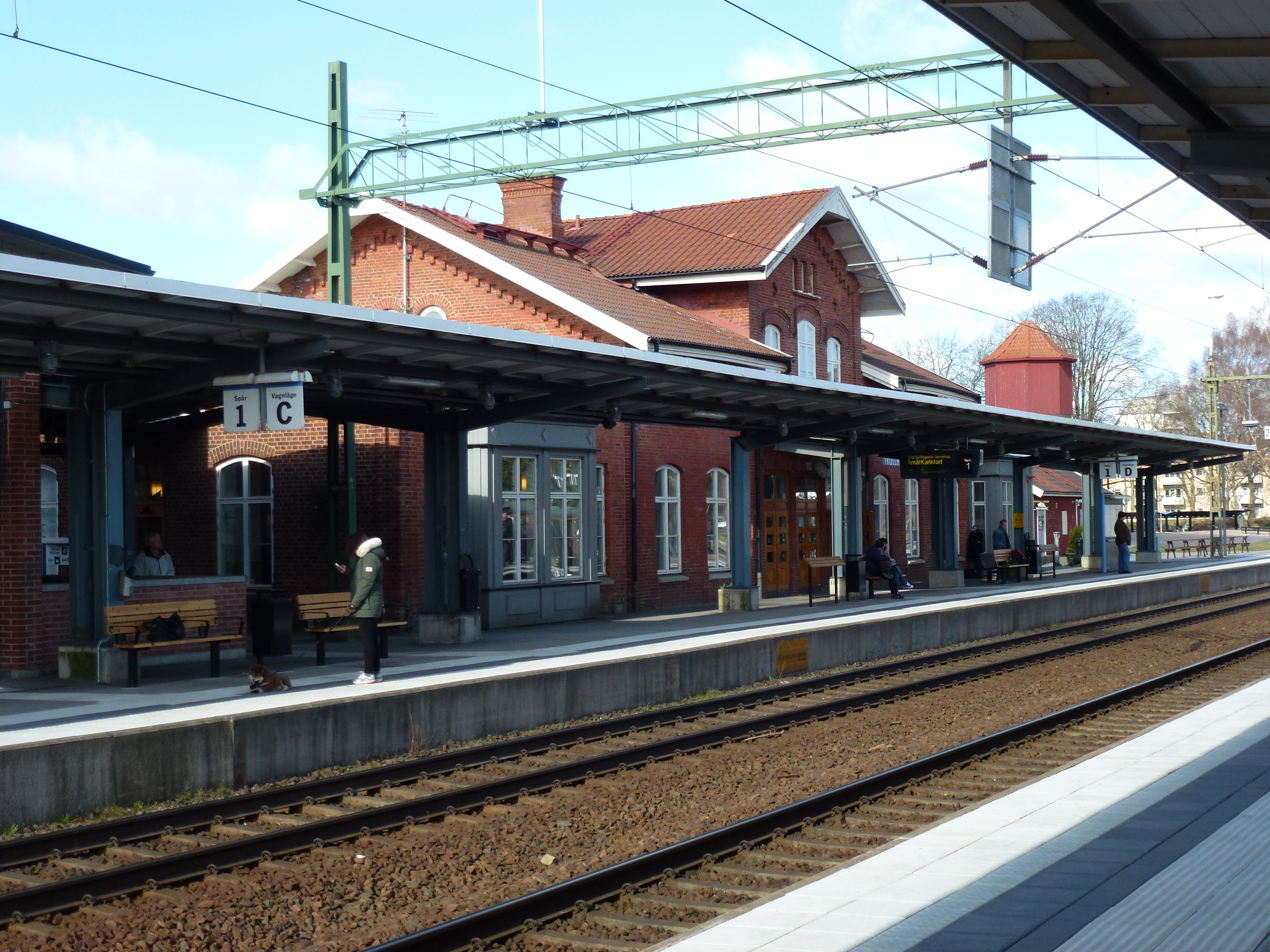
- Trollhättan Railway Station

- Coat of arms

- Coordinates: 58°17′N 12°17′E
- Country: Sweden
- County: Västra Götaland County
- Seat: Trollhättan

Area
  - Total: 427.72 km^{2} (165.14 sq mi)
  - Land: 409.88 km^{2} (158.26 sq mi)
  - Water: 17.84 km^{2} (6.89 sq mi)
- Area as of 1 January 2014.

Population (30 June 2025)
  - Total: 58,990
  - Density: 143.9/km^{2} (372.8/sq mi)
- Time zone: UTC+1 (CET)
  - Summer (DST): UTC+2 (CEST)
- ISO 3166 code: SE
- Province: Västergötland
- Municipal code: 1488
- Website: www.trollhattan.se

Trollhättan Municipality (Swedish: Trollhättans kommun, semi-officially Trollhättans stad) is a municipality in Västra Götaland County in western Sweden. Its seat is located in the city of Trollhättan.

The municipality was created gradually in 1967, 1971 and 1974 during the last local government reform when the City of Trollhättan (itself instituted in 1916) was amalgamated with surrounding municipalities.

The municipality itself prefers to use the denomination Trollhättans stad (City of Trollhättan) for the entire territory, including rural areas. This is purely nominal and has no effect on its status as a unitary municipality. Until 2012 it was the home of the now defunct Saab Automobile.

== Localities ==
- Lextorp
- Björndalen
- Sjuntorp
- Skogshöjden
- Trollhättan (seat)
- Upphärad
- Velanda
- Väne-Åsaka
- Skoftebyn
- Stavre
- Halvorstorp
- Hjulkvarn
- Hjortmossen (Strömslund)

== Demographics ==
This is a demographic table based on Trollhättan Municipality's electoral districts in the 2022 Swedish general election sourced from SVT's election platform, in turn taken from SCB official statistics.

In total there were 59,062 residents, including 43,921 Swedish citizens of voting age. 50.7% voted for the left coalition and 48.0% for the right coalition. Indicators are in percentage points except population totals and income.

| Location | Residents | Citizen adults | Left vote | Right vote | Employed | Swedish parents | Foreign heritage | Income SEK | Degree |
| Location | | | % | % | | | | | |
|---|---|---|---|---|---|---|---|---|---|
| Björndalen | 1,425 | 1,066 | 50.1 | 49.5 | 87 | 87 | 13 | 34,015 | 64 |
| Centrum N | 1,413 | 1,275 | 52.6 | 46.3 | 79 | 82 | 18 | 22,469 | 50 |
| Centrum S | 1,759 | 1,523 | 51.2 | 47.2 | 78 | 76 | 24 | 24,193 | 43 |
| Centrum V | 1,787 | 1,507 | 45.6 | 52.8 | 79 | 77 | 23 | 25,657 | 46 |
| Centrum Ö | 1,668 | 1,411 | 58.0 | 40.6 | 70 | 68 | 32 | 20,694 | 40 |
| Dannebacken | 2,099 | 1,611 | 51.0 | 47.8 | 79 | 81 | 19 | 26,505 | 43 |
| Halvorstorp | 2,141 | 1,675 | 43.8 | 56.0 | 90 | 92 | 8 | 32,620 | 47 |
| Hjortmossen | 1,594 | 1,285 | 56.3 | 40.9 | 68 | 64 | 36 | 21,036 | 43 |
| Hjulkvarn | 1,486 | 1,185 | 48.6 | 50.4 | 86 | 88 | 12 | 29,695 | 50 |
| Karlstorp | 1,798 | 1,247 | 55.6 | 42.5 | 61 | 61 | 39 | 18,416 | 41 |
| Kronogården N | 1,616 | 927 | 66.2 | 28.7 | 50 | 15 | 85 | 14,155 | 25 |
| Kronogården S | 2,181 | 1,303 | 69.7 | 27.2 | 54 | 19 | 81 | 16,228 | 25 |
| Kronogården V | 1,825 | 951 | 68.5 | 28.0 | 52 | 20 | 80 | 12,856 | 25 |
| Källstorp | 1,262 | 965 | 52.2 | 46.8 | 90 | 91 | 9 | 32,293 | 60 |
| Lextorp N | 2,082 | 1,302 | 68.8 | 28.9 | 50 | 24 | 76 | 15,127 | 25 |
| Lextorp S | 2,257 | 1,547 | 63.0 | 34.7 | 69 | 35 | 65 | 21,977 | 31 |
| Sandhem | 1,925 | 1,502 | 51.9 | 47.6 | 89 | 87 | 13 | 28,789 | 46 |
| Sjuntorp N | 1,750 | 1,339 | 40.4 | 58.6 | 86 | 86 | 14 | 28,273 | 37 |
| Sjuntorp S | 1,308 | 968 | 42.5 | 57.1 | 84 | 87 | 13 | 27,387 | 38 |
| Skoftebyn N | 1,693 | 1,209 | 50.7 | 47.6 | 70 | 64 | 36 | 24,382 | 43 |
| Skoftebyn V | 1,584 | 1,234 | 49.4 | 50.0 | 89 | 84 | 16 | 30,611 | 57 |
| Skoftebyn Ö | 1,285 | 1,053 | 45.3 | 54.3 | 88 | 85 | 15 | 33,167 | 56 |
| Skogshöjden | 2,309 | 1,665 | 45.3 | 54.1 | 82 | 77 | 23 | 31,106 | 53 |
| Stavre V | 1,700 | 1,333 | 51.6 | 47.6 | 77 | 81 | 19 | 25,458 | 43 |
| Stavre Ö | 1,783 | 1,320 | 48.0 | 50.9 | 84 | 87 | 13 | 28,834 | 47 |
| Strömslund | 1,883 | 1,424 | 45.0 | 54.2 | 89 | 89 | 11 | 32,133 | 55 |
| Sylte N | 1,835 | 1,108 | 60.0 | 35.9 | 53 | 39 | 61 | 15,104 | 30 |
| Sylte S | 1,885 | 1,383 | 58.2 | 40.3 | 72 | 51 | 49 | 22,200 | 31 |
| Tingvalla N | 1,442 | 1,232 | 51.1 | 46.9 | 79 | 75 | 25 | 24,954 | 50 |
| Tingvalla S | 1,143 | 977 | 46.8 | 51.8 | 67 | 76 | 24 | 24,700 | 55 |
| Torsred | 2,129 | 1,574 | 46.6 | 52.9 | 87 | 90 | 10 | 30,925 | 55 |
| Upphärad | 1,172 | 904 | 44.1 | 55.0 | 83 | 89 | 11 | 26,285 | 33 |
| Velanda | 1,807 | 1,308 | 42.7 | 56.6 | 85 | 82 | 18 | 30,219 | 42 |
| Åsaka-N Björke | 2,036 | 1,608 | 40.8 | 58.1 | 85 | 92 | 8 | 26,657 | 35 |
Source: SVT
