= Klara Zimmergren =

Swedish comedian (born 1967)

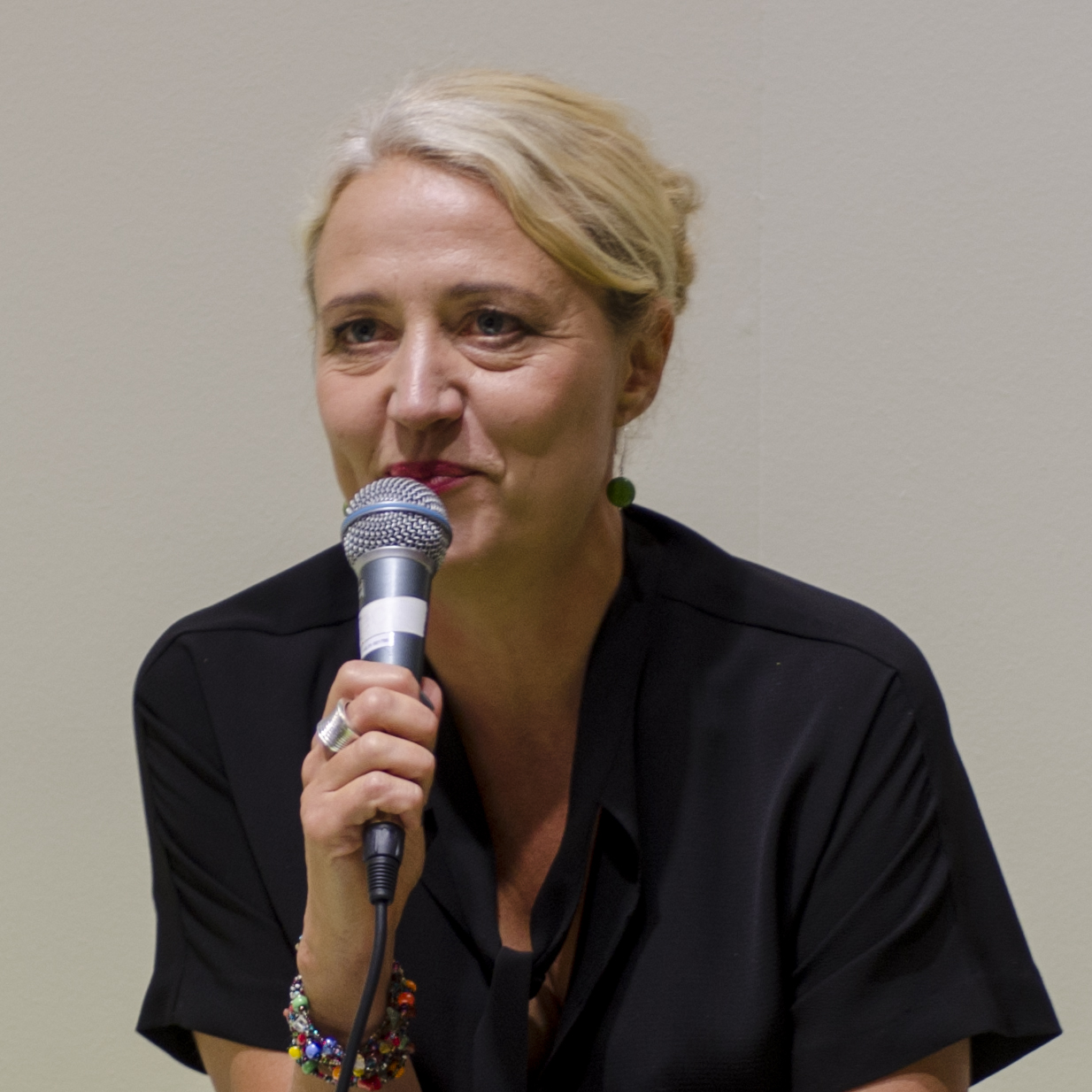
- Zimmergren in 2014
- Born: Klara Elisabet Zimmergren; 16 February 1967 (age 58); Norrköping, Sweden
- Occupations: Comedian; radio host
- Children: 3

Klara Elisabet Zimmergren (born 16 February 1967) is a Swedish comedian and radio talk show host on Sveriges Radio P3 and since 2007 she has appeared on the SVT comedy show Mia och Klara along with Mia Skäringer. Skäringer and Zimmergren have also been involved in joint projects before on radio such as Roll On and Bossanova. Since 2009 Zimmergren also hosts the SVT programme Djursjukhuset and she has also been a judge on the quiz show Vi i femman.

She was born in 1967 in Norrköping.

She has been a host on the radio program Sommar in 2008, 2012 and 2020.
