= Ängelby =

- Title card
- Genre: Drama; Mystery; Thriller
- Created by: Johan Kindblom; Tomas Tivemark
- Directed by: Per Hanefjord
- Starring: Mia Skäringer; Göran Ragnerstam; Joel Spira; Michaela Thorsén; Anna Bjelkerud; Amanda Ooms; Linda Molin; Melker Wernberg; Sigrid Högberg
- Composer: Ulf Janson
- Country of origin: Sweden
- Original language: Swedish
- No. of seasons: 1
- No. of episodes: 12

Production
- Executive producer: Johan Hedman
- Producer: Pontus Sjöman
- Cinematography: Ola Magnestam
- Editor: Emil Stenberg
- Running time: 44 minutes
- Production company: Sveriges Television

Original release
- Network: SVT1
- Release: 28 September 2015 – present

Ängelby is a Swedish television drama series created by Johan Kindblom and Tomas Tivemark, first broadcast by SVT in 2015. The series, which premiered on 28 September 2015 on SVT1 and was broadcast on ITV Encore in the UK from 31 August 2016, follows Vera Fors (Mia Skäringer), an ordinary mother-of-two whose life is turned upside down by a tragic event. After her husband has an affair with another woman, Vera loses the job that her husband got her, and desperately seeking new employment, she responds to a job vacancy in Ängelby, a small remote suburban city.

As Vera seeks the opportunity to start a new life, she makes the decision to take the children and move to Ängelby. But on the way, tragedy strikes when Vera appears to hit and kill a teenage ice-hockey star. In shock, Vera runs from the crime scene, but when she reports the incident to the police the next day, she discovers the boy's body has disappeared. Despite the incident, Vera becomes determined to make a life for herself in Ängelby. However, she soon comes to realise that the boy's disappearance is just the beginning of a series of strange and unpleasant events to occur in Ängelby, forcing Vera to make the decision to get to the bottom of things.

SVT confirmed that following positive reception and strong international sales for the first series, a second series has entered production.

== Cast ==
- Mia Skäringer as Vera Fors
- Göran Ragnerstam as Torsten Huzell
- Joel Spira as Amos Poe
- Michaela Thorsén as Viveka Wallström
- Anna Bjelkerud as Lärarinnan Eva Lindgren
- Amanda Ooms as Britt-Louise Vogel
- Linda Molin as Therese Malm
- Melker Wernberg as Calle Weltman
- Sigrid Högberg as Tova Fors
- Viktor Larsson as Espen Fors
- Jonas Sjöqvist as Jakob Medin
- Jerker Fahlström as Rune Eskilsson
- Pär Luttropp as Markus Blom
- Timo Nieminen as Rudi Malm
- Örjan Landström as John Wallin
- Danilo Bejarano as Daniel Schiller
- Gunilla Johansson as Martha Wallin
- Marall Nasiri as Elsie Lantz

== Episodes ==
=== Series 1 (2015) ===
| No. | Title | Directed by | Written by | Airdate | UK viewers (million) |
|---|---|---|---|---|---|
| 1 | "Episode 1" | Per Hanefjord | Johan Kindblom & Tomas Tivemark | 28 September 2015 | 0.42 |
Vera has just been dumped by her husband, and lost her job at the same time. She gets a job offer in a different town, and packs in her children and all the essentials into the car. Just before she arrives at Ängelby, she hits a boy with her car. In shock, she establishes that he is dead and drives off in panic. But was it really Vera that killed him?
| 2 | "Episode 2" | Per Hanefjord | Johan Kindblom & Tomas Tivemark | 5 October 2015 | 0.30 |
The boy whom Vera had run over is later found buried in a field, however, it appears he was dead three hours before she hit him with her car.
| 3 | "Episode 3" | Per Hanefjord | Johan Kindblom & Tomas Tivemark | 12 October 2015 | N/A |
The dead boy's mother goes to see the police. Meanwhile, Vera receives an anonymous package containing a book, which chronicles the history of Angelby.
| 4 | "Episode 4" | Per Hanefjord | Johan Kindblom & Tomas Tivemark | 19 October 2015 | 0.33 |
Vera searches the hunting cabin for Torsten. The autopsy report shows that Jesper's knuckles were crushed and contained wooden splinters. A tragic accident turns Vera's already messy life upside down.
| 5 | "Episode 5" | Per Hanefjord | Martina Bigert & Maria Thulin | 26 October 2015 | N/A |
Amos and Viveka make a discovery at Torsten's hunting cabin. Has Vera really arrived at Angelby by coincidence, or is there someone who wanted her there? Therese and Calle continue their surveillance for Jesper's murderer.
| 6 | "Episode 6" | Per Hanefjord | Vanja Torp | 2 November 2015 | N/A |
Vera meets with her parents to learn whether she and Jesper are cousins. Therese translates Jesper's CD's into Swedish, in the hope that it may help find his murderer. New discoveries are found at Hango field.
| 7 | "Episode 7" | Per Hanefjord | Johan Kindblom & Tomas Tivemark | 9 November 2015 | N/A |
Vera and John meet by a coincidence and John tells her that it's the stone's fault that Jesper is dead. Vera, Markus and Jakob go to their empty childhood home to find clues to their fathers research about the stone. Eva seems to know a lot more than she lets on.
| 8 | "Episode 8" | Per Hanefjord | Johanna Holmström | 16 November 2015 | N/A |
Vera is closing in on the truth about her biological parents. Excavations of Hangö field shows that people have been buried there for centuries. But even finds from the 1980's is excavated. Therese makes a discovery when it comes to the mystical boy in jacket who bicycles around Ängelby.
| 9 | "Episode 9" | Per Hanefjord | Martina Bigert & Maria Thulin | 23 November 2015 | N/A |
Vera tells Markus and Jakob they are her siblings. Is it Vera that everybody in town have been waiting for? Vera were on her way to Brussels but had to cancel the trip. She might have task to complete before she leaves, but what task would that be?
| 10 | "Episode 10" | Per Hanefjord | Johanna Holmström | 30 November 2015 | N/A |
Vera is mourning a terrible message, but also gets an unexpected visit. A frustrated Amos confronts Atlas and questions him about his plans. Rudi is on the run and entrusts Britt-Louise. Therese and Calle's relationship is being complicated by their parents problems. Rune and Åke tries to gather the people of Ängelby but Eva is not convinced. Viveka begins to wonder what agenda Amos really have. The countdown has begun, but to what?
| 11 | "Episode 11" | Per Hanefjord | Johan Kindblom & Tomas Tivemark | 7 December 2015 | N/A |
Britt-Louise goes to the police with new information and Jespers murderer is arrested. Viveka still want to continue the case while Amos becomes more weighed down by his secrets. Rune and Åke is putting pressure on Eva, who have her own plans. Britt-Louise is grooming Rudi for his mission. Vera tells Markus and Jakob what she has gone through. She finally finds out why she came to Ängelby and what they must do, but the brothers have different point of view on the matter. The people of Ängelby disagree about Veras role in the matter.
| 12 | "Episode 12" | Per Hanefjord | Johan Kindblom & Tomas Tivemark | 14 December 2015 | N/A |
Contradictions are revealed when the people of Ängelby prepare for the big day. It's time to choose a side. Rudi is hesitant about his mission and a disappointed Britt-Louise is asking for a favor. Eva has high hopes, while Jakob and Markus disagree about what will happen. Rune and Åke will stop at nothing to get what they want. Therese gets a visit by someone who gives her a challenge. Vera finds out how wrong everything can get, but she is missing something before she can fulfil her destiny. Everybody has been waiting for this day to come, but nothing happens as it...
