= Ack Värmland =

- Genre: Comedy
- Directed by: Ulf Malmros; Jaana Fomin
- Starring: Mia Skäringer; Ida Hallquist; Johan Östling; Björn A. Ling; Tomas Tjerneld; Sussie Eriksson; Hanna Ingman; Bengt Alsterlind; Lotta Tejle
- Country of origin: Sweden
- Original languages: Swedish, Värmländska

Original release
- Network: TV4 (Swedish TV channel)
- Release: March 13, 2015

Ack Värmland is a Swedish comedy series that started broadcasting in 2015 on TV4. The show was filmed in Trollhättan and had its premiere on 13 March 2015. The series follows some characters from the small town of Molkom in Värmland. It was later revealed that because of the popularity of the show a second season would be filmed.

== Cast ==
- Mia Skäringer – Anette
- Ida Hallquist – Fanny
- Johan Östling – Ola
- Björn A. Ling – Pontus
- Tomas Tjerneld – Janne
- Sussie Eriksson – Sol-Britt
- Hanna Ingman – Bea
- Bengt Alsterlind – Granne
- Lotta Tejle – Granne
