= Teenage Crime (song) =

Single by Adrian Lux

from the album Adrian Lux
- Released: 11 June 2010
- Length: 2:48 (radio edit)
- Label: Axtone La Vida Locash
- Songwriters: Adrian Lux; Roger Hynne
- Producer: Adrian Lux

Adrian Lux singles chronology
"Can't Sleep" (2009)	"Teenage Crime" (2010)

Music video
- "Teenage Crime" on YouTube

"Teenage Crime" is a song performed by Swedish dance music producer and DJ Adrian Lux, released on 11 June 2010. The song features guest vocals by Linnéa Martinsson of Lune and was placed at number six on the Triple J Hottest 100, 2010.

== Music video ==
The music video was directed by Tobias Hansson in Stockholm, Sweden. It depicts a story about a middle-aged mother who cannot hide from her past by leaving her family in the night as a modern-day cougar catching young hipster boys at a partying nightclub to spend and make out with.

== Cultural impact ==
The "Axwell & Henrik B Remode" of the song was included on Swedish House Mafia's debut album Until One in 2010.

Greenpeace have used the song in an advertisement targeting Coca-Cola for its stance against Container deposit legislation in Australia. This ad was banned by the Nine Network and has since become popular on YouTube.

== Track listing ==
- Digital Download"
1. "Teenage Crime" (Radio Edit) - 2:48
2. "Teenage Crime" (Original) - 6:07
3. "Teenage Crime" (Axwell & Henrik B Remode) - 7:03
4. "Teenage Crime" (Axwell Remix) - 6:56
5. "Teenage Crime" (Instrumental) - 6:06

== Charts ==
Chart performance for "Teenage Crime"
Chart (2010)	Peak position
Australia (ARIA)	35
Belgium (Ultratip Bubbling Under Flanders)	3
Belgium (Ultratop 50 Wallonia)	50
Global Dance Songs (Billboard)	21
Netherlands (Single Top 100)	97
Sweden (Sverigetopplistan)	49

== Certifications ==
Certifications for "Teenage Crime"
Region	Certification	Certified units/sales
Australia (ARIA)	Platinum	70,000^{^}
Sweden (GLF)	Platinum	40,000^{‡}
^{^} Shipments figures based on certification alone.^{‡} Sales+streaming figures based on certification alone.
