= Lugnås guitars =

Swedish guitar company

Lugnås guitars are produced by the Lugnås Gitarr AB factory in Lugnås, Sweden. The company was founded by Hans Persson.

== First workshop ==
Persson established the business in 1938, building a factory in the backyard of his home. Instruments from the factory were branded as Hans Persson Instrumentverkstad and Lugnås.

The end of the Second World War led to a boost in demand for guitars. In 1947 the factory received an order for half a million guitar strings from Levin, a major Swedish guitar manufacturer based in Gothenburg.

In 1951 the factory started manufacturing zithers, and remains one of few global suppliers of zithers and zither strings. Hans Persson's son Lennart Persson joined the family business in 1959 at the age of 14. Spurred by the emergence of guitar-based pop in the early 60's, production of guitars exploded. At its peak The factory employed 13 staff.</ref name=gp /> and

== Classical guitars ==
In 1964 Hans Persson designed a range of classical guitars for Swedish guitar virtuoso Evert Ahlander. The 6 models ranged from school instruments (Student and Rondino) to standard and concert guitars (Menuett, Classic, Soloist and Concert). In total 7 000 guitars were manufactured under the Ahlander brand. A few years later, in 1967, Hans Persson launched a new range of guitars under the Swedtone brand. These included the Carina, Palermo, Cremona, Tarragona and the 7/8 sized school guitar Serenad. The Palermo and the Serenad were also available with steel strings. The Lugnås brand was refined with a new logotype in 1969, and the models Granada, Toledo, Sevilla, Valencia, Tarragona and Studio sold well until production ceased in 1976. During the 60's, the factory also supplied 70 000 necks to Levin and Goya guitars manufactured in Gothenburg.

In the 70's, the Lugnås factory produced for jazz guitarist and music shop owner Birger Steiner under the Steiner and BS brands. The guitars were discontinued after Birger Steiner sold his business to EMI.

When Levin changed ownership in 1982 and production was restarted the year after, Hans Persson guitar factory was contracted to manufacture bodies to the new models. In 1988, the production of Levin's top-of-the-line classical guitars, the Classic 8, 10 and 12 models, was moved to the factory. More than 6 000 Levin guitars have been produced by the Lugnås factory.

== Family business ==
Lennart Persson took over after his father died in 1999.

In 2012, Lugnås Gitarr AB was formed to secure Swedish guitar production in the Lugnås guitar factory, including Hans Persson's legacy brands Swedtone and Lugnås.

As of 2014, the Lugnås factory has built more than 45,000 guitars.

== Further Information ==
- Lugnås Swedish Quality Guitars Homepage for Lugnås guitars.
- Levin guitars Homepage for Levin guitars.
