= Väne-Åsaka =

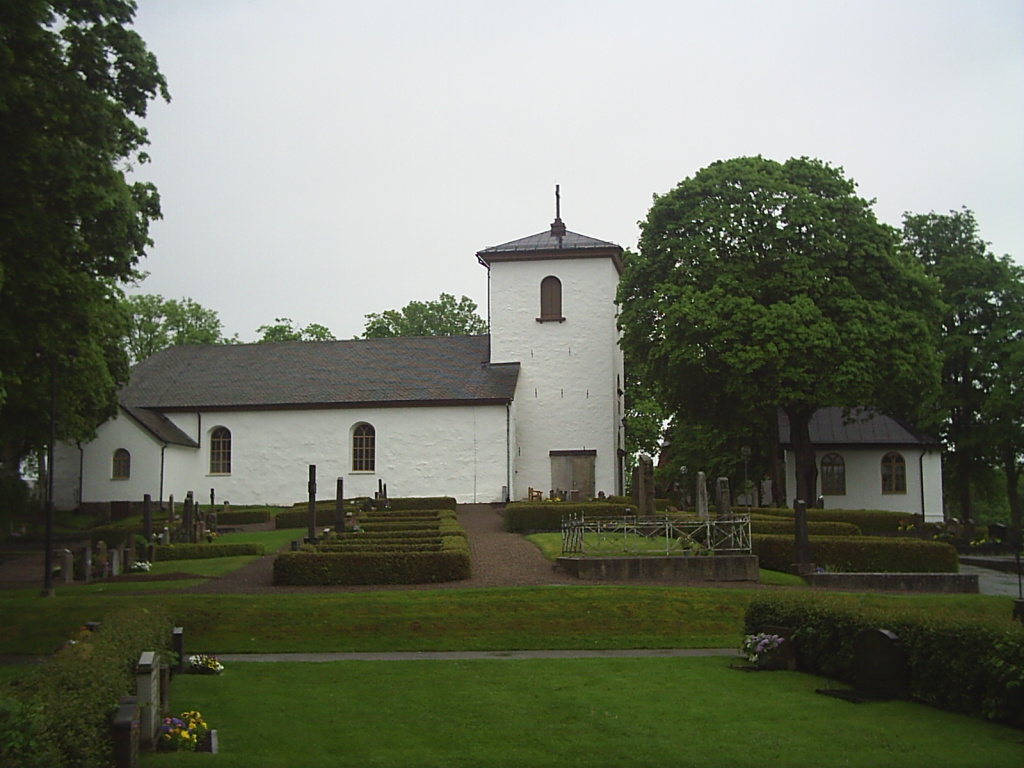
- Väne-Åsaka church

- Location within Västra Götaland Location within Sweden
- Coordinates: 58°15′N 12°25′E
- Country: Sweden
- Province: Västergötland
- County: Västra Götaland County
- Municipality: Trollhättan Municipality

Area
  - Total: 0.48 km^{2} (0.19 sq mi)

Population (31 December 2010)
  - Total: 292
  - Density: 613/km^{2} (1,590/sq mi)
- Time zone: UTC+1 (CET)
  - Summer (DST): UTC+2 (CEST)

Väne-Åsaka is a locality situated in Trollhättan Municipality, Västra Götaland County, Sweden with 292 inhabitants in 2010. It locally known as Åsaka. Väne is name of the old hundred, added to the name by authorities in 1885 to tell this place and four other Åsaka in Västra Götaland apart.

== History ==
The church, around which the settlement is situated, has details from the 1100s. The baptismal font is from the Middle Ages.

In the 1950s, Rolf Mellde - an engineer and car designer for Saab - began constructing prototypes for a lightweight roadster racing car in a barn in Väne-Åsaka. This prototype became the Saab Sonett I. After a secretive development period the car was revealed at the Stockholm Bilsalong in 1954.
