= Björn A. Ling =

Swedish actor and bandy player

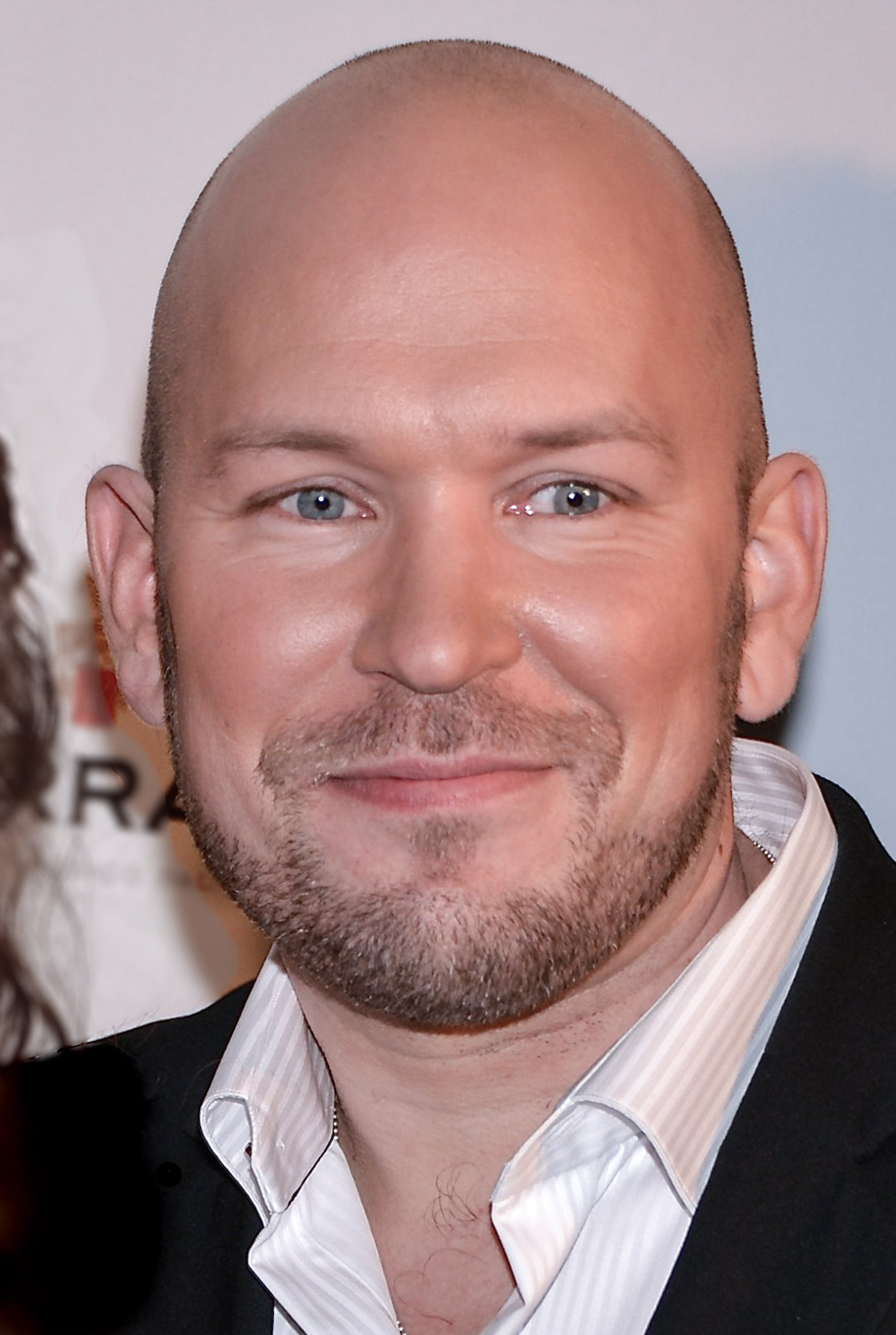
- Björn A. Ling in 2013.
- Born: 5 August 1974 (age 51); Karlstad, Sweden
- Occupation: Actor

Björn Thomas Andersson Ling (né Andersson; born 5 August 1974), briefly known as Björn Starrin is a Swedish actor and bandy player. He was a member of the showband The Starboys between 1997 and 2003. For his role as Robin in the film Bröllopsfotografen, Ling was nominated for a Guldbagge in 2010 in the category Best male lead role. Ling has previously played bandy on elite level in the clubs IF Göta Bandy and IF Boltic.

Ling has also presented the show Eftersnack on SVT for the local news show.

He has previously been seen in films such as Smala Sussie and television shows such as Ack Värmland which is broadcast on TV4.
