= Adrian Lux =

Swedish disc jockey and music producer

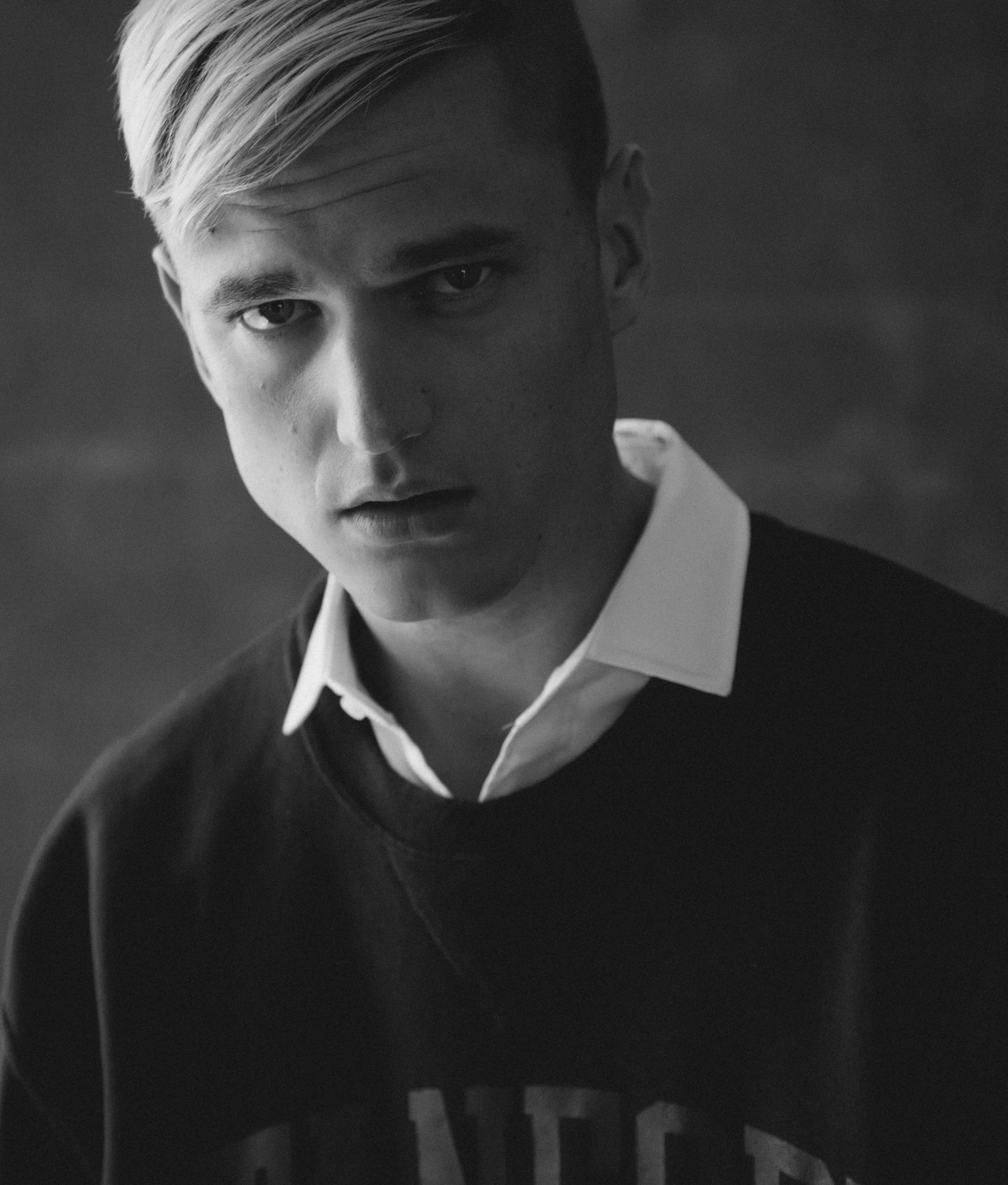
- Adrian Lux in October 2015

Background information
- Birth name: Prinz Adrian Johannes Hynne
- Born: 1 May 1986 (age 39)
- Origin: Sweden
- Genres: Techno, house
- Occupation(s): Producer, DJ
- Labels: La Vida Locash / Ultra Records
- Website: Official website

Prinz Adrian Johannes Hynne, better known as Adrian Lux (born 1 May 1986), is a Swedish disc jockey and music producer. His biggest chart success is "Teenage Crime". Adrian Lux released his debut album on the 3rd of April, 2012. The self-titled album contains 12 tracks, including his previous singles "Teenage Crime", "Alive", "Fire" and "Burning", as well as a bonus track "Leave the World Behind". The album features several artists including Dante, Joakim Berg, And Then, Rebecca & Fiona, The Good Natured, and Lune.

His music has been showcased and remixed by several prominent DJs such as Avicii, Style of Eye, Philgood, Ali Payami, Marcus Schössow and Axwell. Lux has himself done remixes for Lana Del Rey, Deborah Cox, Basement Jaxx, Salem Al Fakir and Oskar Linnros.

On January 21, 2014, Adrian Lux and Cash Cash released a collaboration called “Bullet” on SoundCloud as a free download.

== In popular culture ==
Adrian Lux's track "Can't Sleep" is featured in the video-game FIFA 11. Another track of his named "Wild Child" is also featured in the video game 2014 FIFA World Cup Brazil, both made by EA Sports.

"Damaged" appears in season 3 episode 16 of MTV's hit show Teen Wolf.

Lux starred alongside Albin Myers and Nause in the Swedish television programme Heartbeats on TV6.

== Discography ==
=== Studio albums ===
Year	Album	Notes
2012	Adrian Lux	Track listing: 1. "Burning" featuring Dante (3:44); 2. "All I Ever Wanted" featuring Joakim Berg (3:18); 3. "Teenage Crime" (2:48); 4. "Weekend Heroes" (3:31); 5. "Can't Sleep" (3:11); 6. "Angels" (2:42); 7. "Silence" featuring And Then (3:27); 8. "Boy" featuring Rebecca & Fiona (2:56); 9. "Alive" featuring The Good Natured (3:33); 10. "Wildheart" (2:50); 11. "Fire" featuring Lune (2:53); 12. "Leave the World Behind" (bonus track) (2:38)

=== Extended plays ===
- 2008: Strawberry
- 2014: Make Out

=== Singles ===
Year	Single	Peak positions					Certification	Album
Year	Single	SWE	AUS	BEL (Fl)	BEL (Wa)	NED	Certification	Album
2010	"Teenage Crime"	49	35	53	50	97	ARIA: Platinum	Adrian Lux
2011	"Boy" (featuring Rebecca & Fiona)	–	–	–	85	–		Adrian Lux
2011	"Alive" (featuring The Good Natured)	–	–	112	–	–		Adrian Lux
2012	"Burning" (featuring Dante)	–	–	–	–	–		Adrian Lux
2013	"Damaged"	57	–	–	–	–		Non-album singles
2015	"Torn Apart"	–	–	–	–	–		Non-album singles
2017	"All Aloud"	–	–	–	–	–		Non-album singles
2018	"As I Sleep" (featuring Charlee)	–	–	–	–	–		Non-album singles
2019	"Meditation"	–	–	–	–	–		Non-album singles
2019	"Life on Mars"	–	–	–	–	–		Non-album singles
"—" denotes a recording that did not chart or was not released.

Other songs

- 2010: "Strawberry"
- 2011: "Can't Sleep"
- 2012: "Fire"
- 2012: "Silence"
- 2013: "Wild Child"
- 2014: "Doge!"
