= Eva Kallin =

American mathematician

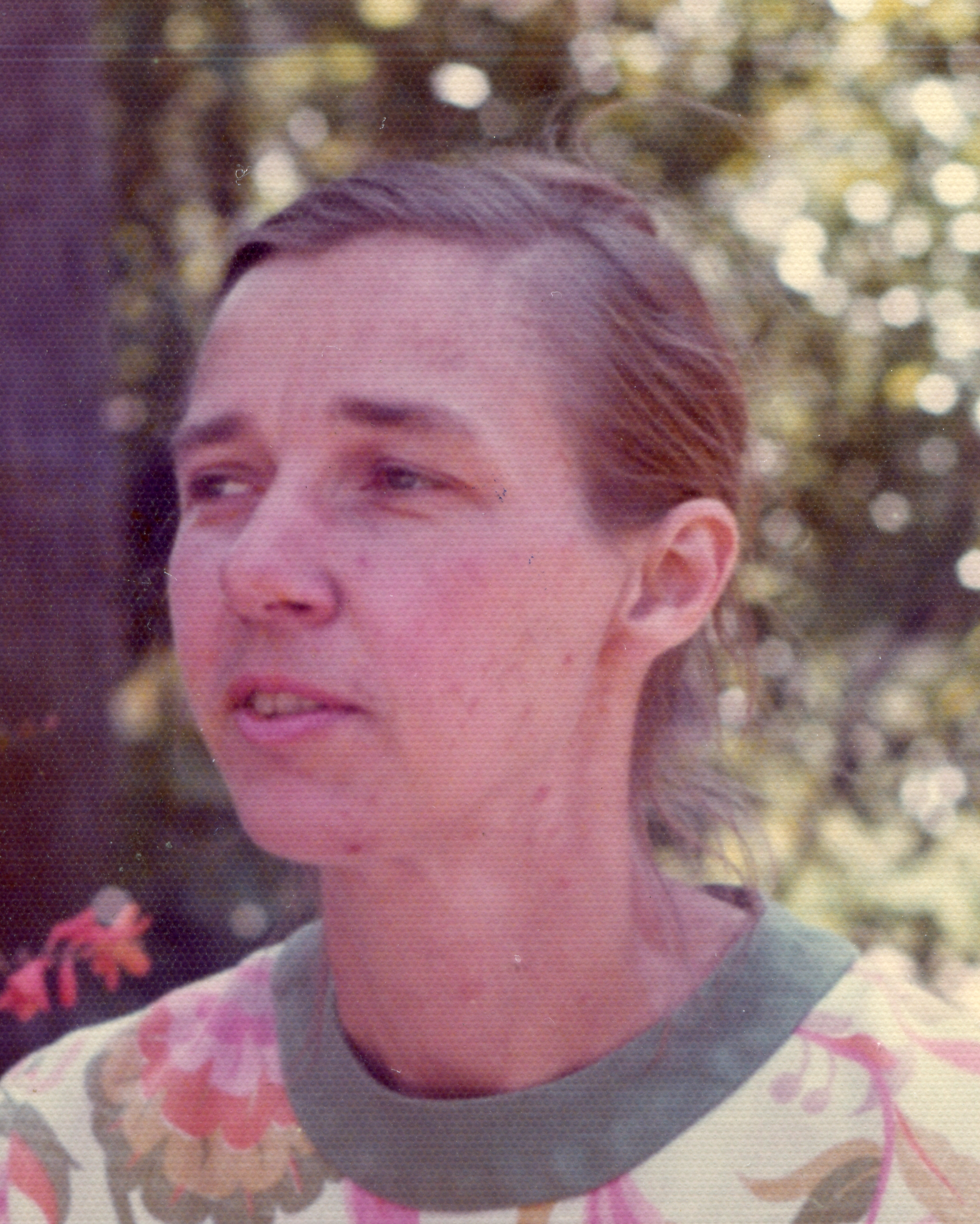
Portrait of Eva Kallin Pohlmann

Eva Marianne Kallin Pohlmann is a professor emerita of mathematics at Brown University. Her research concerns function algebras, polynomial convexity, and Tarski's axioms for Euclidean geometry.

Kallin attended the University of California, Berkeley as an undergraduate, and graduated with an A.B. in mathematics in 1953 and an M.S. in 1956. In 1956–1957, working as a student of Alfred Tarski, Kallin helped simplify Tarski's axioms for the first-order theory of Euclidean geometry, by showing that several of the axioms originally presented by Tarski did not need to be stated as axioms, but could instead be proved as theorems from the other axioms.

Kallin earned her Ph.D. in 1963 from Berkeley under the supervision of John L. Kelley. Her thesis, only 14 pages long, concerned function algebras, and a summary of its results was published in the Proceedings of the National Academy of Sciences. One of its results, that not every topological algebra is localizable, has become a "well-known counterexample".

In the study of complex vector spaces, a set S is said to be polynomially convex if, for every point x outside of S, there exists a polynomial whose complex absolute value at x is greater than at any point of S. This condition generalizes the ordinary notion of a convex set, which can be separated from any point outside the set by a linear function. However, polynomially convex sets do not behave as nicely as convex sets. Kallin studied conditions under which unions of convex balls are polynomially convex, and found an example of three disjoint cubical cylinders whose union is not polynomially convex. As part of her work on polynomial convexity, she proved a result now known as Kallin's lemma, giving conditions under which the union of two polynomially convex sets remains itself polynomially convex.
