= Sjuntorp =

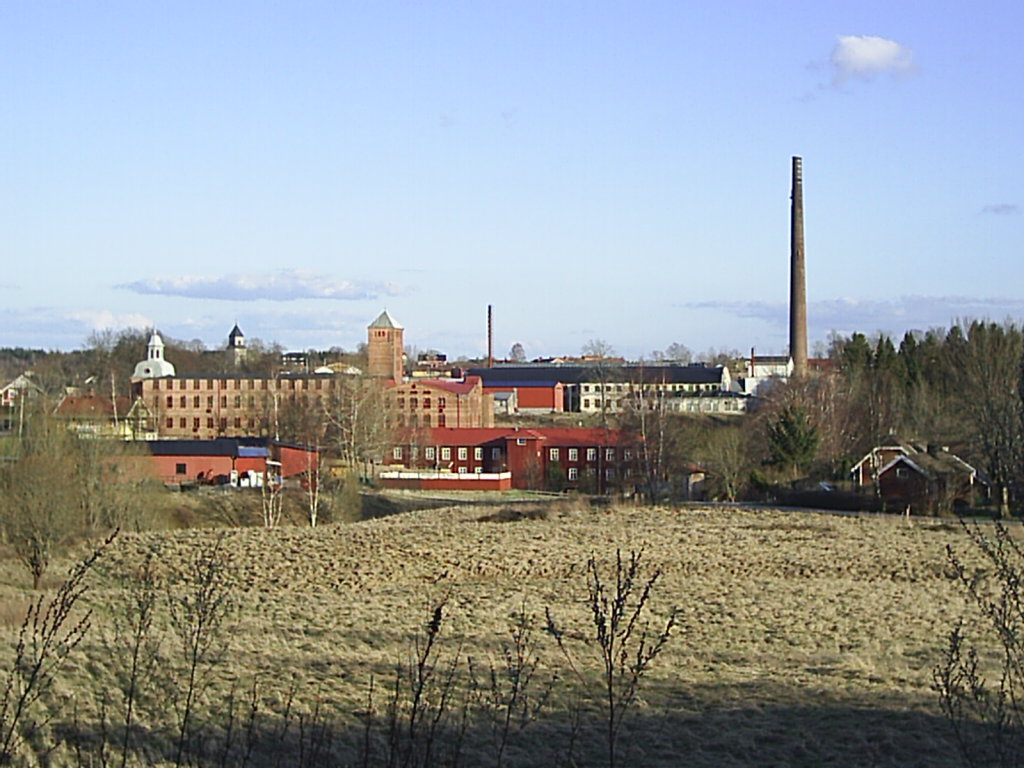

- Location within Västra Götaland Location within Sweden
- Coordinates: 58°12′N 12°13′E
- Country: Sweden
- Province: Västergötland
- County: Västra Götaland County
- Municipality: Trollhättan Municipality

Area
  - Total: 2.40 km^{2} (0.93 sq mi)

Population (31 December 2010)
  - Total: 2,124
  - Density: 884/km^{2} (2,290/sq mi)
- Time zone: UTC+1 (CET)
  - Summer (DST): UTC+2 (CEST)

Sjuntorp (Swedish pronunciation: [ˈɧɵ̌nːtɔrp]) is locality situated in Trollhättan Municipality, Västra Götaland County, Sweden with 2,124 inhabitants in 2010.
