= Upphärad =

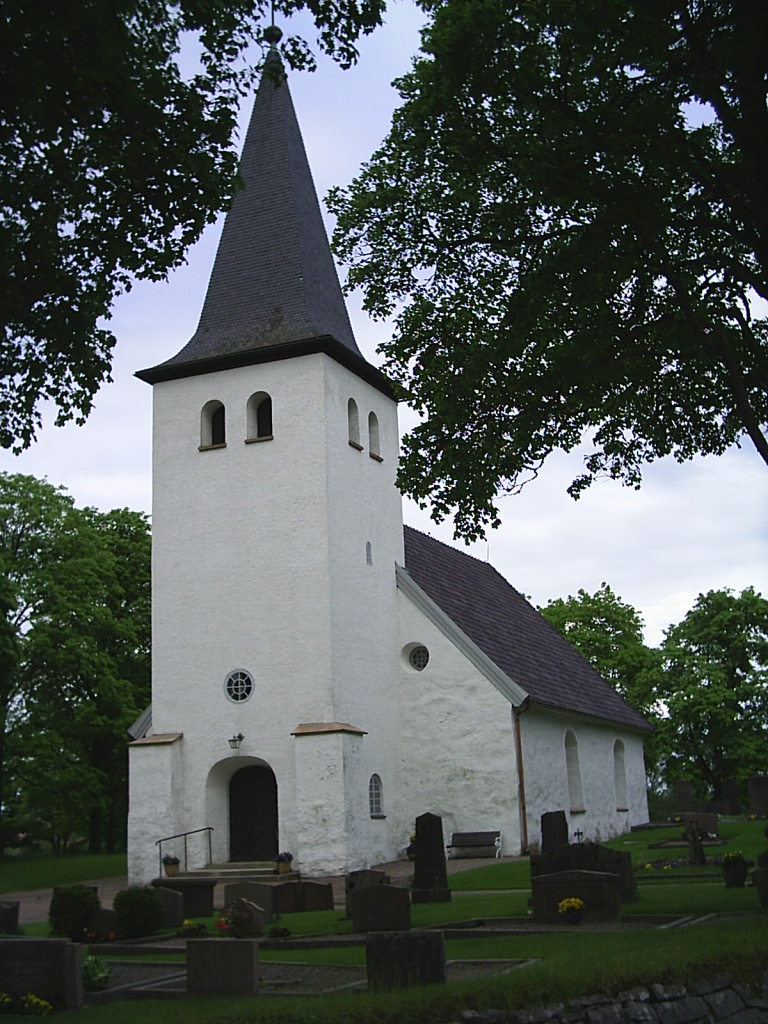
- A church in Upphärad

- Location within Västra Götaland Location within Sweden
- Coordinates: 58°10′N 12°17′E
- Country: Sweden
- Province: Västergötland
- County: Västra Götaland County
- Municipality: Trollhättan Municipality

Area
  - Total: 0.59 km^{2} (0.23 sq mi)

Population (31 December 2010)
  - Total: 588
  - Density: 995/km^{2} (2,580/sq mi)
- Time zone: UTC+1 (CET)
  - Summer (DST): UTC+2 (CEST)

Upphärad is a locality situated in Trollhättan Municipality, Västra Götaland County, Sweden with 588 inhabitants in 2010.
