= Nause (band) =

Swedish electronic music band

- Origin: Stockholm, Sweden
- Genres: House, progressive house, electro house
- Occupations: Record producer, DJ
- Years active: 2008–present
- Label: Warner Music
- Members: Jacob Criborn; Leonard Scheja
- Past members: Kami Montgarde
- Website: Official website

Nause is a Swedish electro house and house music record production and DJ duo consisting of Jacob Criborn and Leonard Scheja.

== Career ==
They signed with Warner Music. In 2008, Nause was formed in Stockholm by Jacob Criborn, Kami Montgarde & Leonard Scheja. Their debut single hit "Made Of" was a big success on radio in Sweden and England. Nause is starring in the TV series "Heartbeats" on TV6. During the spring and summer of 2012, Nause went on a tour of Sweden.

== Discography ==
=== Singles ===
Year	Single	Peak positions		Certification
Year	Single	SWE	POL	Certification
2011	"Made Of"	15	—	2× Platinum
2012	"Mellow"	40	—	Gold
2012	"Hungry Hearts"	1	—	
2013	"This Is the Song"	37	—	
2013	"Head Over Heels"	4	—	
2015	"The World I Know"	27	—	
2016	"Dynamite" (featuring Pretty Sister)	13	40	
2018	"Aqualung" (featuring Miss Li)	— (Note: "Aqualung" did not enter the Sverigetopplistan singles chart, but peaked at number seven on the Sverigetopplistan Heatseeker chart.)	—	
2019	"Perfect Crime" (featuring Daniel Gidlund)	—	—	
2019	"Can't Erase" (with Rebecca & Fiona)	—	—	
2020	"From Now" (featuring Jaynie)	—	—	
2020	"Feel"	—	—	
"—" denotes a recording that did not chart or was not released.

=== Remixes ===
2013

- Afrojack and Chris Brown - As Your Friend (Nause Remix)
- Morten Breum - Larva (Far Away) (Nause Remix)

2012

- Sway & Mr. Hudson - Charge (Nause Remix)
- Eric Turner - Angels & Stars (Nause Remix)

2011

- Rebecca & Fiona - Bullets (Adrian Lux & Nause Remix, Radio Edit)
- Kaskade & Rebecca & Fiona - Turn It Down (Nause Remix)
- Adrian Lux & Rebecca & Fiona - Boy (Nause Remix)
- Kwan Hendry & SoulCream - Don't Give Up (Nause Remix)
- David Morales & Jonathan Mendelsohn - You Just Don't Love Me (Nause Remix)
- Britney Spears - Hold It Against Me (Adrian Lux & Nause Remix, Radio Edit)
- Lazee, Adam Tensta, & Eric Turner - Young N Restless (Nause Remix)
- Lazee, Madcon, & Julimar - Tag (Nause Remix, Radio Edit)

2010

- Rebecca & Fiona - Luminary Ones (Nause Remix)
- Tiësto - Feel It In My Bones (Nause Remix)
- TheElement - Sultan of Soul (Nause Remix)
- TheElement - Give Uz Dat (Nause Remix)

2009

- Deadmau5 - Strobe (Nause Remix)
