= Staffan Scheja =

Swedish pianist and professor (born 1950)

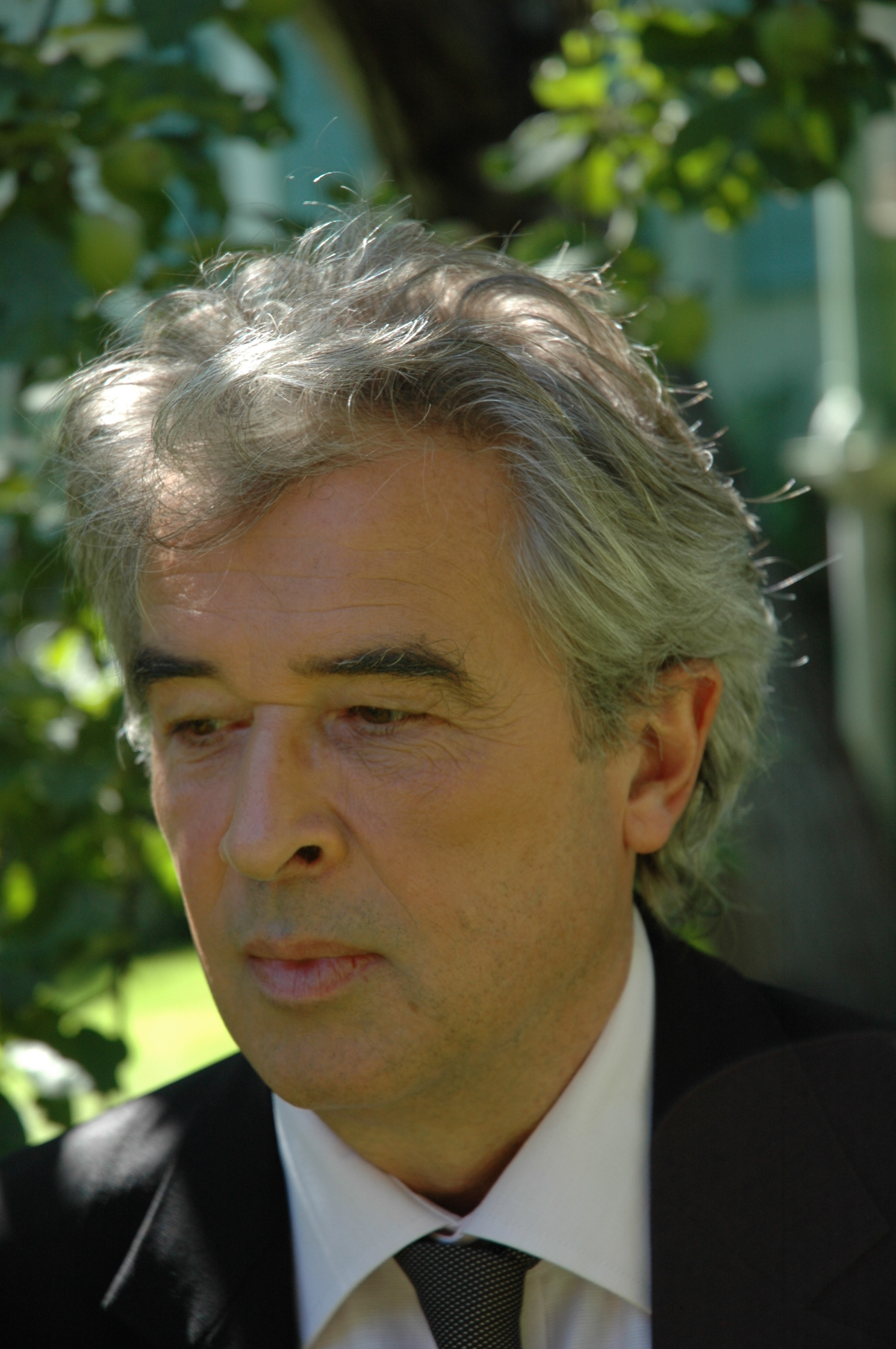
- Scheja in 2007
- Born: Bo Staffan Scheja; 25 April 1950 (age 76); Danderyd Municipality, Sweden
- Occupations: Pianist, professor
- Known for: Stjärnorna på slottet

Bo Staffan Scheja (born 25 April 1950) is a Swedish pianist and professor. Scheja started studying piano at the age of nine and made his concert debut at the age of 14 with the Sveriges Radios symfoniorkester. He also performed with the Royal Stockholm Philharmonic Orchestra. He studied at the Royal College of Music in Stockholm 1964–1969 and 1969–1972 at the Juilliard School in New York with pianists Rosina Lhévinne, Ilona Kabos and Ania Dorfmann.

In 1975, he was the awardee at the international Ferruccio Busoni International Piano Competition in Bolzano. For a number of years he lived in the US and performed in concerts at Carnegie Hall and at several head of state visits by Swedish dignitaries to the US.

He is a professor of piano and also prorector at the Royal College of Music since 1997 and has held a chair at the Royal Swedish Academy of Music since 2001. He founded and was artistic director for the Gotland Chamber Music Festival, held annually at Gotland since the 1980s. He is also the director of the Gotland Baltic Music Academy. In 2010 Scheja performed at the Pianomusik på Konstakademien, a special session at the Konstakademien in Stockholm.

In 1995, he was awarded the Litteris et Artibus, and he has received several Swedish Grammis awards. In 2008, he was a participant in the Sveriges Television 2009 series Stjärnorna på slottet along with four other Swedish celebrities. In the series he had a well-publicized feud with comedian Jonas Gardell when Scheja tried to teach Gardell how to play the violin.

In August 2010, he was presenter of an episode of the Sveriges Radio series Sommar i P1.

Scheja is on the jury for the award, Jan Wallander Prize 2026.

== Family ==
Staffan Scheja is the father of Swedish DJ Rebecca Scheja, and ex-husband of Swedish actress Marianne Scheja.
