= Anna Kristina Kallin =

Swedish singer and actor

Anna Kristina Kallin-Häggblom (6 December 1953 in Umeå – 25 August 2004 in Gothenburg) was a Swedish singer and actor. She appeared in many plays at Backa Theatre, among them Aniara, Spöket på Canterville, Eliza and Girl Power.
