= Slim Susie =

- Swedish DVD cover
- Directed by: Ulf Malmros
- Written by: Ulf Malmros; Petteri Nuottimäki
- Produced by: Christer Nilson
- Starring: Tuva Novotny; Jonas Rimeika; Björn Starrin; Kjell Bergqvist; Lotta Tejle; Malin Morgan
- Cinematography: Mats Olofsson
- Distributed by: Home Vision Entertainment (HVE); Sandrew Metronome Distribution Sverige AB
- Release date: 2003
- Running time: 97 minutes
- Country: Sweden
- Language: Swedish

Slim Susie (Swedish: Smala Sussie) is a 2003 Swedish comedy-crime film. It was directed by Ulf Malmros and written by Malmros and Petteri Nuottimäki. It is considered Ulf Malmros's most popular film.

== Plot ==
The film is set in a small industrial town in Värmland, where a young man returns to his hometown from Stockholm to investigate the sudden disappearance of his sister. He initially has little success with his inquiries, performed through the rekindling of brief acquaintances with the odd characters of his youth, and he eventually forms a picture of what has happened.

== Cast ==
Most of the actors are amateurs, with Tuva Novotny, Kjell Bergqvist and Michael Nyqvist being the only ones of greater prominence. Björn Starrin and Lotta Tejle had their breakthrough in the film.

- Tuva Novotny as Smala Sussie (Slim Susie), the sister of Erik
- Jonas Rimeika as Erik, who moved away to Stockholm 3 years prior to the plot.
- Björn Starrin as Grits Pölsa, a wheeler, pothead and drugdealer interested in filmmaking and makes wine of garbage and leftovers in his spare time.
- Kjell Bergqvist as Billy Davidsson, a corrupt local policeman, relocated from Stockholm
- Malin Morgan as Sandra, working in the pizzeria
- Lotta Tejle as Gudrun, Sussies coworker and a disgruntled wife
- Michael Nyqvist as Mörka Rösten ("the dark voice"), a police officer from Karlstad
- Lena Dahlman as Gerd, proprietor of the VCR cassette rental and local drug lord
- Johan Andersson as Micke Tretton (cf. The Piranha Brothers in Monty Python's Flying Circus) Small time offender, stoner and wigger.
- Anders Blomberg as Tore Tumör, the single father of a baby and fakes being mute; previously operated on because of a brain tumor in an attempt to make an insurance claim
- Nicky Horn as Davidssons wife
- Bengt Alsterlind as Gunnar, the husband of disgruntled Gudrun
- Lena Wallman-Alster as Erik's mother, an alcoholic
- Rolf H. Karlsson as Cinemaoperator
- Olle Wirenhed as Konsum-owner Ralf

== Soundtrack ==
- "Dirty And Cheap" Performed by Randy
- "No Right" Performed by Whyte Seeds
- "Billy The Coach" Performed by Leif Karate
- "Newfound Lover" Performed by Tuva Novotny
- "Stupid" Performed by Camela Leierth
- "Palace Station" Performed by Melody Club
- "Notes About Freedom" Performed by Act II
- "Live It Up" Performed by Papa Dee
- "X-Ray Eyes" Performed by Randy
- "Hip Teens" Performed by Frank Popp Ensemble
- "Slow Motions" Performed by Whyte Seeds
- "Say Oh Say" Performed by Isolation Years
- "No Place Like Home" Performed by Moses
- "In The Healing Rain" Performed by Travellers In Time
- "Perpetuum Mobile" Performed by The Penguin Café Orchestra
- "Dirty Tricks" Performed by Randy
